= 2024–25 Liga 4 national phase =

First season of the Liga 4 in Indonesia

The 2024–25 Liga 4 national phase is scheduled to begin on 21 April and conclude on 27 May 2025. The top 64 teams from 38 provincial leagues in the provincial phase will compete for 8 promotion spots to the 2025–26 Liga Nusantara. Each provincial league will have at least one representative, with the number of representatives adjusted based on the league's coefficient.

== Format ==
A total of 64 teams will participate in the national phase.

- First Round: The 64 teams are divided into 16 groups of four, with each group competing in a home tournament format. The winners and runners-up of each group advance to the second round.
- Second Round: The 32 qualified teams (winners and runners-up from the first round) are divided into 8 groups of four. Each group follows the same home tournament format, with the winners and runners-up advancing to the third round.
- Third Round: The remaining 16 teams are divided into 4 groups of four, competing in a home tournament format. The winners and runners-up of each group advance to the fourth round and earn promotion to the 2025–26 Liga Nusantara.
- Fourth Round: The 8 remaining teams are divided into 2 groups of four. The winners of each group advance to the final.
- Final: The two group winners from the fourth round face off in a single-match final to determine the league champion.

== Teams ==
=== Qualified teams ===
The following teams will represent their respective provincial leagues in the national phase.

**Sumatra Region**
Provincial leagues	Qualified teams
Aceh	**Persidi Idi Rayeuk**
Aceh	PSAB Aceh Besar
Aceh	PS Peureulak Raya
North Sumatra	**Victory Dairi**
North Sumatra	PS Kwarta Deli Serdang
Riau	**Wahana**
Riau	Pekanbaru (Note: Persemai Dumai, the runner-up of the 2024–25 Liga 4 Riau, qualified for the national phase but later withdrew due to financial problems. Their slot was subsequently given to Pekanbaru, the third-placed team.)
Riau Islands	Not held
West Sumatra	**Josal Piaman**
West Sumatra	PSPP Padang Panjang
Jambi	**Persebri Batanghari**
Bengkulu	**Tri Brata Rafflesia**
Bangka Belitung Islands	**PS Bangka**
South Sumatra	**PS Palembang**
South Sumatra	KMP Bumara
Lampung	**Persikomet Metro**

**Kalimantan Region**
Provincial leagues	Qualified teams
West Kalimantan	**Gabsis Sambas**
Central Kalimantan	**Sylva Kalteng**
South Kalimantan	**PS Kab. Tapin**
South Kalimantan	Putra Plaosan Martapura
East Kalimantan	**Kartanegara**
North Kalimantan	**Persemal Malinau**

**Java Region**
Provincial leagues	Qualified teams
Banten	**Persic Cilegon**
Banten	Harin
Jakarta	**Batavia**
Jakarta	ASIOP
Jakarta	Persitara North Jakarta (Note: Persitara North Jakarta, the third-placed team of the 2024–25 Liga 4 Jakarta, was selected by PSSI to fill the spot vacated by Siwalima, as there were no eligible clubs remaining from Maluku.)
West Java	~~**PS Cimahi Putra**~~ (Note: PS Cimahi Putra, the champions of the 2024–25 Liga 4 West Java Series 1, qualified for the national phase but withdrew after the draw and prior to playing their first match due to financial problems.)
West Java	Persipu
West Java	Cimahi United
West Java	Pesik Kuningan
West Java	Persikabumi Sukabumi
West Java	Persikasi Bekasi
Central Java	**Persebi Boyolali**
Central Java	Persika Karanganyar
Central Java	Persibat Batang
Central Java	Persip Pekalongan
(Special Region of Yogyakarta) Yogyakarta	**PS HW UMY**
East Java	**Persewangi Banyuwangi**
East Java	Persinga Ngawi
East Java	PS Mojokerto Putra
East Java	Persema Malang
East Java	Sang Maestro
East Java	Mitra Surabaya
East Java	Inter Kediri
East Java	Persikoba Batu

**Nusa Tenggara Islands Region**
Provincial leagues	Qualified teams
Bali	**Perseden Denpasar**
West Nusa; Tenggara	**Persidom Dompu**
West Nusa; Tenggara	~~Garuda Muda~~ (Note: Garuda Muda, the runner-up of the 2024–25 Liga 4 West Nusa Tenggara, qualified for the national phase but later withdrew following the passing of their owner.)
East Nusa Tenggara	**Bintang Timur Atambua**
East Nusa Tenggara	Persebata Lembata
East Nusa Tenggara	Perseftim East Flores

**Sulawesi Region**
Provincial leagues	Qualified teams
Gorontalo	**Kreasindo Rajawali**; **Sultan**
Gorontalo	Persital Talumolo
North Sulawesi	**PS Klabat XIII Jaya Sakti**
Central Sulawesi	**Celebest**
West Sulawesi	**PS Sandeq**
South Sulawesi	**Mangiwang**
South Sulawesi	Perslutim East Luwu
Southeast Sulawesi	**UHO MZF**

**Maluku Islands Region**
Provincial leagues	Qualified teams
(Maluku (province)) Maluku	~~**Siwalima**~~ (Note: Siwalima, the champions of the 2024–25 Liga 4 Maluku, qualified for the national phase but later withdrew due to financial problems.)
North Maluku	Not held

**Papua Region**
Provincial leagues	Qualified teams
Southwest Papua	**Persikos Sorong**
(West Papua (province)) West Papua	**Persipegaf Arfak Mountains**
(West Papua (province)) West Papua	Manokwari United (Note: Manokwari United, the runner-up of the 2024–25 Liga 4 West Papua, was selected by PSSI to fill the spot vacated by Garuda Muda, as there were no eligible clubs remaining from West Nusa Tenggara.)
Central Papua	**Persipuncak Puncak**; **Carstensz**
(Papua (province)) Papua	Not held
Highland Papua	**Persigubin Bintang**; **Mountains**
South Papua	**Persimer Merauke**

Notes:

- BOLD: Champions of each provincial league.
- Grey background denotes provinces that did not sent representative to the national phase.

=== Locations ===
Locations of non-Java-based 2024–25 Liga 4 national phase teams.
Yellow: Provincial league champions; Red: Other qualified teams (based on provincial quota).
Locations of Jakarta-based 2024–25 Liga 4 national phase teams.
Yellow: Provincial league champions;
Red: Other qualified teams (based on provincial quota).
Locations of Java-based 2024–25 Liga 4 national phase teams.
Yellow: Provincial league champions; Red: Other qualified teams (based on provincial quota).

.

=== Personnel and kits ===
Note: Flags indicate national team as has been defined under FIFA eligibility rules. Players and Managers may hold more than one non-FIFA nationality.

Team	Head coach	Captain	Kit manufacturer	Main kit sponsor	Other kit sponsor(s)
ASIOP	(Indonesia) Apridiawan		(Indonesia) Erspo	Bank Mandiri	List: Front: Sompo Insurance Indonesia, Transtama Logistics; Back: Ethiopian Airlines, Mitra Orphys; Sleeves: PT Inti Sukses Garmindo; Shorts: None
Batavia	(Indonesia) Charis Yulianto		(Indonesia) Curva Sport	PSF Group	List: Front: Back: Sleeves: Shorts:
Bintang Timur Atambua	(Indonesia) Lodovikus Mau	(Indonesia) Crespo Hale	(Indonesia) Made by club	Nekamese Group	List: Front: PT Dharma Lautan Utama, Mandiri Taspen; Back: Sleeves: Aqua; Shorts:
Celebest	(Indonesia) Lukman Masiara		(Indonesia) Made by club	ESSA	List: Front: Back: Sleeves: Shorts:
Cimahi United	(Indonesia) Yadi Mulyadi		(Indonesia) N-Rush	KAI	List: Front: N-Rush, CV CiKS Bandung, SLEMN24, Ahdi Consultant; Back: CV Primacon, PT Niaga Guna Sarana, Thirteen Sports, Soegiri Infini Arena, PT Prima Karya Abadi Konstruksi, Thirteens Football Academy, Karya Prima Abadi; Sleeves: None; Shorts: None
Gabsis	(Indonesia) Jefridin Anwar		(Indonesia) Noir Apparel	Sambas Berkah Berkemajuan	List: Front: Back: Sleeves: Shorts:
Harin	(Indonesia) Lerby Hidayatullah		(Indonesia) Odsey Sport	UMJ	List: Front: Harin Sport Arena; Back: Laris Food Court; Sleeves: Shorts:
Inter Kediri	(Indonesia) Budiardjo Thalib	(Indonesia) Galih Akbar	(Indonesia) RG Sportwear	IPK	List: Front: None; Back: rgsportwear.com, Kota Kediri Mapan; Sleeves: None; Shorts: None
Josal Piaman	(Indonesia) Joni Efendi	(Indonesia) Agung Wijaksono	(Indonesia) Cyto	Josal	List: Front: Indah Logistik; Back: Sleeves: Shorts:
Kartanegara	(Indonesia) Nor Alam		(Indonesia) Keroan Idaman^{1}	Kartanegara Football Club	List: Front: Back: Sleeves: Shorts:
KMP Bumara	(Indonesia) Ardi Hernando		(Indonesia) Positive Apparel	Pinus Residence	List: Front: Perumahan Pekon Duta Muda 5, Perumahan OSS Premium 3, Grand Bumara Regency, Grand Kencana Utama Cluster Luxury; Back: Bungsu Lima Bersaudara, KMP Property; Sleeves: Shorts:
Kreasindo Rajawali Sultan	(Indonesia) Ramang Lakoro		(Indonesia) Made by club	Jackarmy	List: Front: Sultan FC, Kreasindo FC, Sultan Rental Equipment, Pino's, Xavier Store; Back: Sleeves: Shorts:
Mangiwang	(Indonesia) Yusrifar Djafar		(Indonesia) OnSide	PT Barakah Niaga Semen	List: Front: Sahabat Cundiank; Back: Sleeves: Arus Perubahan; Shorts:
Manokwari United	(Indonesia) Eduard Ivakdalam		(Indonesia) Made by club	Manokwari Untuk Semua Semua Untuk Manokwari	List: Front: Manokwari Town Government, Conch Indonesia; Back: None; Sleeves: Shorts: None
Mitra Surabaya	(Indonesia) Slamet Sampurno	(Indonesia) Iwan Sampurno	(Indonesia) Noto	Fresco	List: Front: Sarung Mangga, EGO Trading; Back: Fisioroom, DEECORP, Trisakti Management; Sleeves: None; Shorts: None
Pekanbaru	(Indonesia) Ambrizal	(Indonesia) Redo Rinaldi	(Indonesia) Curva Sport	None	List: Front: None; Back: None; Sleeves: None; Shorts: None
Persebata	(Indonesia) Adnan Mahing	(Indonesia) Denis Domaking	(Indonesia) Erilsport	NTT	List: Front: None; Back: None; Sleeves: None; Shorts: None
Persebi	(Indonesia) Doel Khamid	(Indonesia) Noka Bhirawa	(Indonesia) Oliver	None	List: Front: None; Back: None; Sleeves: None; Shorts: None
Persebri Batanghari	(Indonesia) Yefri Yanes	(Indonesia) M. Rian Ari Zarqoni		APDESI Batanghari	List: Front: Back: Sleeves: Shorts:
Perseden	(Indonesia) A. A. Bramastra	(Indonesia) I Made Antha Wijaya	(Indonesia) Sidharta	Bank BPD Bali	List: Front: None; Back: Fitness Plus Indonesia; Sleeves: Bron Cafe Renon; Shorts: None
Perseftim	(Indonesia) Ignasius Halan	(Indonesia) Patisari Aukoli	(Indonesia) Mubarok Apparel	Bank NTT	List: Front: Lewotana; Back: None; Sleeves: None; Shorts: None
Persema	(Indonesia) Ahmad Bustomi		(Indonesia) HSP Sportwear	STIE Malangkucecwara	List: Front: PhysioWell.Mlg, Bintang Galaxy Football Academy; Back: None; Sleeves: None; Shorts: None
Persemal	(Indonesia) Odnel Udan			Persemal FC	List: Front: Back: Sleeves: Shorts:
Persewangi	(Indonesia) Purwanto Suwondo		(Indonesia) TM Sportswear	Flynet (H & A) / None (3rd)	List: Front: Magenta Corpora (H & A) / None (3rd); Back: Genius Milk (H & A) / Flynet, Magenta Corpora, Genius Milk (3rd); Sleeves: Banyuwangi Rebound; Shorts: None
Persibat	(Indonesia) Imral Usman	(Indonesia) Johan Yoga Utama	(Indonesia) Estaft	Kawasan Industri Terpadu Batang	List: Front: PLTU Batang; Back: Tafakur; Sleeves: None; Shorts: None
Persic	(Indonesia) Hariyadi Puthul	(Indonesia) Azat Sudrajat	(Indonesia) XMET Sport	Bank BJB	List: Front: None; Back: None; Sleeves: None; Shorts: None
Persidi	(Indonesia) Ridwan Salam		(Indonesia) Rathen (H) (Indonesia) Montzs (A)	BPMA (H) / MW Young Warriors (A)	List: Front: MedcoEnergi, Bank Syariah Indonesia, Bank Aceh (H) / None (A); Back: Sleeves: Shorts:
Persidom	(Indonesia) Syamsudin			None	List: Front: Back: Sleeves: Shorts:
Persigubin	(Indonesia) Agung Priatmojo		(Indonesia) Made by club	Bintang Mountains Regency Government	List: Front: Back: Yetelas; Sleeves: Shorts:
Persika Karanganyar	(Indonesia) Slamet Riadi	(Indonesia) Aan Priyono	(Indonesia) Amrta	None	List: Front: None; Back: None; Sleeves: None; Shorts: None
Persikabumi	(Indonesia) Hendi Gunawan	(Indonesia) Arif Setiawan	(Indonesia) RD Sportwear	Persikabumi	List: Front: None; Back: RD Sportwear; Sleeves: None; Shorts: None
Persikasi	(Indonesia) Abdullah Sapei		(Indonesia) PDJ Apparel	None	List: Front: None; Back: None; Sleeves: MSB Indonesia; Shorts: None
Persikoba	(Indonesia) Arif Suyono		(Indonesia) Fans Apparel	Carabao Hydration	List: Front: Jatim Park Group, Bank Jatim, ASTON Inn Batu, Siiplah; Back: Concrete Batu, mBatu SAE; Sleeves: Buah Tangan; Shorts: None
Persikomet	(Indonesia) Joko Santoso	(Indonesia) Yudi Pramono	(Indonesia) ELTEN	Putra Baru Group	List: Front: Mas Physio, Bakso Tenes El Pra Mit Metro; Back: ELTEN; Sleeves: Shorts:
Persikos	(Indonesia) Moyo Malibela		(Indonesia) Zenio	Persikos	List: Front: None; Back: Kota Sorong; Sleeves: None; Shorts: None
Persimer			(Indonesia) Made by club	Merauke Regency Government	List: Front: South Papua Provincial Government; Back: Sleeves: Shorts:
Persinga	(Indonesia) Joko Susilo		(Indonesia) ADSport	Daya Tani Sejahtera	List: Front: Bank Jatim; Back: Mas Antok DRJ, Andri Bolang, Bank Syariah Ngawi, Vida Jaya Ban; Sleeves: Cleo Pure Water, Javamix, Sawah Hijau; Shorts: None
Persip	(Indonesia) Jamal Yastro		(Indonesia) Giggsy	Pieter Jackson	List: Front: Bank Pekalongan; Back: Kospin Jasa, Bank Jateng; Sleeves: None; Shorts: None
Persipegaf	(Indonesia) Masdra Nurriza		(Indonesia) Made by club	Persipegaf	List: Front: Arfak Mountains Regency Government; Back: None; Sleeves: None; Shorts: None
Persipu	(Indonesia) Hasnan Sungkar		(Indonesia) MJ Product	Balmerol Lubricants	List: Front: Big Bear Recording; Back: Bebas Cedera; Sleeves: STR Mini Soccer; Shorts:
Persipuncak Carstensz	(Indonesia) Kornelius Samay	(Indonesia) Nerius Alom	(Indonesia) Made by club	Cartensz	List: Front: Puncak Regency Government; Back: Sleeves: Shorts:
Persital	(Indonesia) Romy Malanua		(Indonesia) Made by club	Safaat Kirana Kaltim	List: Front: PT Voritzy Jaya Gorontalo, Kalla Aspal, PT Petra Anugerah Sejahtera; Back: MyPertamina; Sleeves: Shorts:
Persitara	(Indonesia) Nur Jati	(Indonesia) Muhammad Fahri	(Indonesia) HKB Apparel	Jakarta Utara	List: Front: Forum RT-RW DKI Jakarta, Pelindo; Back: None; Sleeves: None; Shorts: None
Perslutim			(Indonesia) NS Apparel	Luwu Timur Inspiring	List: Front: Back: Sleeves: Shorts:
Pesik	(Indonesia) Boy Jati Asmara	(Indonesia) Supriatna	(Indonesia) Vestikal Pro	RCB	List: Front: Nodeem, Yoshino Gypsum, YUKK; Back: None; Sleeves: None; Shorts: None
PS Bangka	(Indonesia) Romel		(Indonesia) Made by club	Unmuh Babel	List: Front: Lazismu Babel, Rektor UMY; Back: Sleeves: Shorts:
PS HW UMY	(Indonesia) Nopendi		(Indonesia) Buntar Apparel	BRImo	List: Front: PT Sinergi Visi Utama Consultant; Back: UMY, Lazismu UMY, Buntar Apparel; Sleeves: HumaProperti, Sandang Sport Jogja; Shorts: None
PS Kab. Tapin	(Indonesia) Bagus Prabowo		(Indonesia) Eazywear	Bara Rezeki Hamizan	List: Front: Tapin Coal Terminal, BMB2, Antang Gunung Meratus; Back: Sleeves: PT Batu Gunung Mulia; Shorts: None
PS Klabat XIII Jaya Sakti			(Indonesia) Allegiant	PSAD Merdeka	List: Front: Back: Sleeves: Shorts:
PS Kwarta	(Indonesia) Irwansyah Panjaitan		(Indonesia) NAM Apparel	Indo Bintang Electric	List: Front: None; Back: WWJD Sport; Sleeves: None; Shorts: None
PS Mojokerto Putra	(Indonesia) Ridwan Oesman		(Indonesia) AZA	Jamu Iboe	List: Front: Patriots Group; Back: Cleo Pure Water, Jackerton; Sleeves: None; Shorts: None
PS Palembang	(Indonesia) Jarot	(Indonesia) Kesuma Satria	(Indonesia) XTen	Bank Sumsel Babel	List: Front: Back: Sleeves: Shorts:
PS Peureulak Raya	(Indonesia) Rizki Zulfikri		(Indonesia) Montzs (H) (Indonesia) Trops (A)	Indo Buana Group (H) / Bank Aceh (A)	List: Front: Bank Syariah Indonesia KCP Peureulak 2, Fattah Fikri Group (H) / Fattah Fikri Group, BPMA, MedcoEnergi (A); Back: Sleeves: Shorts:
PS Sandeq	(Indonesia) Amdi Wijaya		(Indonesia) Kalkulus Apparel	PS Sandeq	List: Front: None; Back: None; Sleeves: None; Shorts: None
PSAB	(Indonesia) Mukhlis Nakata			PDAM Tirta Mountala (H) / Bank Aceh (A)	List: Front: Back: Sleeves: Shorts:
PSPP	(Indonesia) Suprianto		(Indonesia) Limo Apparel	Suttan Capital	List: Front: Padang Panjang City Government, AmanAgrindo, Nethome.id, PT Hafco Mineral Resources; Back: Sleeves: Shorts:
Putra Plaosan Martapura	(Indonesia) Susilo Sudarman		(Indonesia) HSM	Plaosan Jaya Mandiri	List: Front: Plaosan Maju Bersama; Back: Sleeves: Shorts:
Sang Maestro	(Indonesia) Khoirul Anam		(Indonesia) YF Cloth (first and second rounds) (Indonesia) Oliver (third round onwards)	Kapal Api (first and second rounds) / None (third round onwards)	List: Front: Sarung Mangga (first and second rounds) / None (third round onwards); Back: None; Sleeves: None; Shorts: None
Sylva Kalteng	(Indonesia) Eko Tamamie			BW Indonesia	List: Front: None; Back: PT PSM; Sleeves: LSM Hutan Indonesia, SKMA; Shorts: None
Tri Brata Rafflesia	(Indonesia) M. Nasir		(Indonesia) Nine	Bank Mandiri	List: Front: BSC Nusantara, Bimbel Raja Wiksa; Back: Sleeves: Shorts:
UHO MZF	(Indonesia) Jumilianto		(Indonesia) El Nino	MZF The Professor	List: Front: Back: Sleeves: Shorts:
Victory Dairi	(Indonesia) Eben Siregar	(Indonesia) Sanzai Hutajulu	(Indonesia) 7igan	Toko Emas S. Tarigan G.	List: Front: PT PAS, Parda; Back: Sleeves: Shorts:
Wahana	(Indonesia) Agus Rianto		(Indonesia) Egg Apparel	PT Wahanakarsa Swandiri	List: Front: Back: Sleeves: Shorts:

Notes:

1. Apparel made by club.

=== Coaching changes ===
Team	Outgoing head coach	Manner of departure	Date of vacancy	Replaced by	Date of appointment
Persewangi	(Indonesia) Alexander Saununu	End of contract	1 March 2025	(Indonesia) Purwanto Suwondo	5 March 2025
Inter Kediri	(Indonesia) Hadian Anton Fauzi	End of contract	8 March 2025	(Indonesia) Budiardjo Thalib	8 March 2025
Pesik	(Indonesia) Satria Nurzaman	End of contract	14 March 2025	(Indonesia) Boy Jati Asmara	14 March 2025
Manokwari United	(Indonesia) Ronny Wabia	End of contract	19 April 2025	(Indonesia) Eduard Ivakdalam	19 April 2025
Persip	(Indonesia) Mochammad Hasan	Sacked	24 April 2025	(Indonesia) Jamal Yastro	28 April 2025

== Schedule ==
The schedule of the national phase is as follows.

Round	Clubs remaining	Draw date	Matchday	Date
First round	64→32	14 April 2025	Matchday 1	21–22 April 2025
First round	64→32	14 April 2025	Matchday 2	23–24 April 2025
First round	64→32	14 April 2025	Matchday 3	25–26 April 2025
Second round	32→16	No draw (Note: Pre-determined format)	Matchday 1	29–30 April 2025
Second round	32→16	No draw	Matchday 2	1–2 May 2025
Second round	32→16	No draw	Matchday 3	3–4 May 2025
Third round	16→8	6 May 2025	Matchday 1	10–11 May 2025
Third round	16→8	6 May 2025	Matchday 2	12–13 May 2025
Third round	16→8	6 May 2025	Matchday 3	14–15 May 2025
Fourth round	8→2	No draw	Matchday 1	20 May 2025
Fourth round	8→2	No draw	Matchday 2	22 May 2025
Fourth round	8→2	No draw	Matchday 3	24 May 2025
Knockout round	2→1	No draw	Final	27 May 2025

== Venues ==
The venues for the national phase matches are as follows.

Location of the national phase venues.
- 1 Hoegeng Stadium
- 2 Moh Sarengat Stadium
- 3 Mandala Krida Stadium
- 4 Sultan Agung Stadium
- 5 Kebo Giro Stadium
- 6 Manahan Stadium
- 7 Kota Barat Stadium
- 8 Sriwedari Stadium
- 9 UNS Stadium
- 10 Angkatan 45 Stadium
- 11 Ketonggo Stadium
- 12 Brawijaya Stadium
- 13 Brantas Stadium
- 14 THOR Stadium
- 15 JSG Stadium
- 16 Diponegoro Stadium
- 17 Kompyang Sujana Stadium
- 18 Ngurah Rai Stadium
Location of the national phase venues.
- 6 Manahan Stadium
- 7 Kota Barat Stadium
- 8 Sriwedari Stadium
- 9 UNS Stadium

Group					Stadium	Location	Capacity	Host
R1	R2	R3	R4	F	Stadium	Location	Capacity	Host
A	–	–	–	–	Hoegeng Stadium	Pekalongan	20,000	Persip Pekalongan
B	–	–	–	–	Moh Sarengat Stadium	Batang	15,000	Persibat Batang
C	Q	A	–	–	Mandala Krida Stadium	Yogyakarta	25,000	PSSI (Note: Some venues are hosted directly by PSSI Provincial Association.)
D	R	B	–	–	Sultan Agung Stadium	Bantul	30,000	PSSI
E	S	–	–	–	Kebo Giro Stadium	Boyolali	12,000	Persebi Boyolali
–	–	–	–	F	Manahan Stadium	Surakarta	20,000	PSSI
H	–	C	A	–	Kota Barat Stadium	Surakarta	500	PSSI
–	–	–	B	–	Sriwedari Stadium	Surakarta	12,000	PSSI
G	–	D	–	–	UNS Stadium	Surakarta	2,000	PSSI
F	T	–	–	–	Angkatan 45 Stadium	Karanganyar	2,000	Persika Karanganyar
I	U	–	–	–	Ketonggo Stadium	Ngawi	10,000	Persinga Ngawi
J	–	–	–	–	Brawijaya Stadium	Kediri	10,000	Inter Kediri
K	–	–	–	–	Brantas Stadium	Batu	7,000	Persikoba Batu
L	V	–	–	–	THOR Stadium	Surabaya	1,100	PSSI
M	–	–	–	–	Jember Sport Garden Stadium	Jember	20,000	Mitra Surabaya
N	–	–	–	–	Diponegoro Stadium	Banyuwangi	15,000	Persewangi Banyuwangi
P	X	–	–	–	Kompyang Sujana Stadium	Denpasar	7,000	PSSI
O	W	–	–	–	Ngurah Rai Stadium	Denpasar	12,000	Perseden Denpasar

== Draw ==
=== First round drawing ===
The draw for the first round of the National phase was held on 14 April 2025, 14:30 WIB, via the PSSI TV YouTube channel. A total of 64 teams were drawn into 16 groups of four. For the purposes of the draw, the following principles will apply:

- The draw will be conducted freely, with only the host teams will be seeded.
- All other teams will be placed in two unseeded pots:
  - Pot 1 contained the champions from each province.
  - Pot 2 contained the second, third, and subsequent placed teams according to the national round quota allocation.

Note: Bolded teams qualified for the second round.

Seeded (Hosts)	Unseeded	
Seeded (Hosts)	Pot 1	Pot 2
1. (Central Java) **Persip Pekalongan** (Group A); 2. (Central Java) **Persibat Batang** (Group B); 3. (Central Java) **Persebi Boyolali** (Group E); 4. (Central Java) **Persika Karanganyar** (Group F); 5. (East Java) **Persinga Ngawi** (Group I); 6. (East Java) Inter Kediri (Group J); 7. (East Java) **Persikoba Batu** (Group K); 8. (East Java) Mitra Surabaya (Group M); 9. (East Java) **Persewangi Banyuwangi** (Group N); 10. (Bali) **Perseden Denpasar** (Group O)	11. (Aceh) Persidi Idi Rayeuk; 12. (North Sumatra) Victory Dairi; 13. (Riau) Wahana; 14. (West Sumatra) **Josal Piaman**; 15. (Jambi) Persebri Batanghari; 16. (Bengkulu) **Tri Brata Rafflesia**; 17. (Bangka Belitung Islands) PS Bangka; 18. (South Sumatra) PS Palembang; 19. (Lampung) Persikomet Metro; 20. (Banten) **Persic Cilegon**; 21. (Jakarta) **Batavia**; 22. (West Java) ~~PS Cimahi Putra~~ (Withdrew) (Note: PS Cimahi Putra, champions of the 2024–25 Liga 4 West Java Series 1, withdrew after the draw and prior to playing their first match due to financial problems.); 23. (Special Region of Yogyakarta) PS HW UMY; 24. (West Kalimantan) Gabsis Sambas; 25. (Central Kalimantan) Sylva Kalteng; 26. (South Kalimantan) PS Kab. Tapin; 27. (East Kalimantan) Kartanegara; 28. (North Kalimantan) Persemal Malinau; 29. (West Nusa Tenggara) Persidom Dompu; 30. (East Nusa Tenggara) **Bintang Timur Atambua**; 31. (Gorontalo) Kreasindo Rajawali Sultan; 32. (North Sulawesi) PS Klabat XIII Jaya Sakti; 33. (Central Sulawesi) **Celebest**; 34. (West Sulawesi) PS Sandeq; 35. (South Sulawesi) Mangiwang; 36. (Southeast Sulawesi) UHO MZF; 37. (Southwest Papua) Persikos Sorong; 38. (West Papua (province)) **Persipegaf Arfak Mountains**; 39. (Central Papua) Persipuncak Puncak Carstensz; 40. (Highland Papua) **Persigubin Bintang Mountains**; 41. (South Papua) **Persimer Merauke**	42. PSAB Aceh Besar; 43. (Aceh) **PS Peureulak Raya**; 44. (North Sumatra) **PS Kwarta Deli Serdang**; 45. (Riau) **Pekanbaru**; 46. (West Sumatra) **PSPP Padang Panjang**; 47. (South Sumatra) KMP Bumara; 48. (Banten) **Harin**; 49. (Jakarta) **ASIOP**; 50. **Persitara North Jakarta**; 51. (West Java) Persipu; 52. (West Java) **Cimahi United**; 53. (West Java) Pesik Kuningan; 54. (West Java) **Persikabumi Sukabumi**; 55. (West Java) **Persikasi Bekasi**; 56. (East Java) **PS Mojokerto Putra**; 57. (East Java) **Persema Malang**; 58. (East Java) **Sang Maestro**; 59. (South Kalimantan) Putra Plaosan Martapura; 60. (East Nusa Tenggara) **Persebata Lembata**; 61. (East Nusa Tenggara) Perseftim East Flores; 62. (Gorontalo) **Persital Talumolo**; 63. (South Sulawesi) Perslutim East Luwu; 64. (West Papua (province)) Manokwari United (Note: Garuda Muda, runner-up of the 2024–25 Liga 4 West Nusa Tenggara, withdrew after initially qualifying for the national phase following the passing of their owner. After the draw, PSSI selected Manokwari United, runner-up of 2024–25 Liga 4 West Papua, to take their place as no other eligible clubs remained from West Nusa Tenggara.)

=== Third round drawing ===
The draw for the third round of the National phase was held on 6 May 2025, 16:00 WIB, via the PSSI TV YouTube channel. A total of 16 teams will be drawn into 4 groups of four. The following draw mechanism is applied:

- The 16 teams seeded into two pots based on their performance in second round.
  - Pot 1 contains the group winners of the second round.
  - Pot 2 contains the runners-up teams of the second round.
- The teams will be drawn into 4 groups. Each group contains two teams from pot 1 and two teams from pot 2.

Note: Bolded teams qualified for the fourth round and promoted to 2025–26 Liga Nusantara.

Pot 1	Pot 2
1. (Bengkulu) **Tri Brata Rafflesia**; 2. (Central Java) Persibat Batang; 3. (East Java) Persema Malang; 4. (Central Java) **Persika Karanganyar**; 5. (East Java) **Sang Maestro**; 6. (Jakarta) **Batavia**; 7. (Bali) **Perseden**; 8. (East Nusa Tenggara) **Persebata Lembata**	9. (Central Sulawesi) Celebest; 10. (Banten) Persic Cilegon; 11. (East Java) PS Mojokerto Putra; 12. **Persitara North Jakarta**; 13. (East Java) Persinga Ngawi; 14. (East Java) Persikoba Batu; 15. (Riau) **Pekanbaru**; 16. (East Java) Persewangi Banyuwangi

== First round ==
The 64 teams were drawn into 16 groups of four. The first round was played in a home tournament format of single round-robin matches.

The top two teams of each group were qualified for the Second round.

=== Group A ===
All matches will be held at Hoegeng Stadium, Pekalongan and Moh Sarengat Stadium, Batang.

Pos	Team	Pld	W	D	L	GF	GA	GD	Pts	Qualification	PSP	HAR	PBR	UMY
1	(Central Java) Persip (H)	3	2	1	0	3	0	+3	7	Qualification to the Second round		2–0	1–0	
2	(Banten) Harin	3	2	0	1	3	2	+1	6	Qualification to the Second round			2–0	
3	(Jambi) Persebri Batanghari	3	1	0	2	1	3	−2	3					1–0
4	(Special Region of Yogyakarta) PS HW UMY	3	0	1	2	0	2	−2	1		0–0	0–1		

Source: Liga 4 National Phase
Legend: Blue = home team win; Yellow = draw; Red = away team win.
Rules for classification: 1) Points; 2) Head-to-head points; 3) Head-to-head goal difference; 4) Head-to-head goals scored; 5) Goal difference; 6) Goals scored; 7) Fair-play points; 8) Draw.
(H) Hosts

Group A Matches

Matchday 1 (21 April)
21 April 2025
13:00 UTC+7 (Note: The match was held according to schedule and went ahead until the 55th minute. However, the game was halted due to heavy rain, with the score still Persebri Batanghari 0–0 PS HW UMY. After a short deliberation, the match was decided to be resumed on the next day at 08:00 WIB, with the remaining time to be played at the same venue.)

Persebri Batanghari (Jambi)	1–0	(Special Region of Yogyakarta) PS HW UMY
	Report

Hoegeng Stadium, Pekalongan
21 April 2025
15:15 UTC+7

Persip (Central Java)	2–0	(Banten) Harin
	Report

Hoegeng Stadium, Pekalongan

Matchday 2 (23 April)
23 April 2025
13:00 UTC+7

Harin (Banten)	2–0	(Jambi) Persebri Batanghari
	Report

Hoegeng Stadium, Pekalongan
23 April 2025
15:15 UTC+7

PS HW UMY (Special Region of Yogyakarta)	0–0	(Central Java) Persip
	Report

Hoegeng Stadium, Pekalongan

Matchday 3 (25 April)
25 April 2025
15:30 UTC+7

PS HW UMY (Special Region of Yogyakarta)	0–1	(Banten) Harin
	Report

Moh Sarengat Stadium, Batang
25 April 2025
15:30 UTC+7

Persip (Central Java)	1–0	(Jambi) Persebri Batanghari
	Report

Hoegeng Stadium, Pekalongan

=== Group B ===
All matches will be held at Moh Sarengat Stadium, Batang and Hoegeng Stadium, Pekalongan.

Pos	Team	Pld	W	D	L	GF	GA	GD	Pts	Qualification	PBT	CEL	PFT	MET
1	(Central Java) Persibat (H)	3	3	0	0	8	0	+8	9	Qualification to the Second round		4–0	3–0	
2	(Central Sulawesi) Celebest	3	2	0	1	7	7	0	6	Qualification to the Second round				3–1
3	(East Nusa Tenggara) Perseftim	3	1	0	2	5	9	−4	3			2–4		
4	(Lampung) Persikomet	3	0	0	3	3	7	−4	0		0–1		2–3	

Source: Liga 4 National Phase
Legend: Blue = home team win; Yellow = draw; Red = away team win.
Rules for classification: 1) Points; 2) Head-to-head points; 3) Head-to-head goal difference; 4) Head-to-head goals scored; 5) Goal difference; 6) Goals scored; 7) Fair-play points; 8) Draw.
(H) Hosts

Group B Matches

Matchday 1 (21 April)
21 April 2025
13:00 UTC+7

Celebest (Central Sulawesi)	3–1	(Lampung) Persikomet
	Report

Moh Sarengat Stadium, Batang
21 April 2025
15:15 UTC+7

Persibat (Central Java)	3–0	(East Nusa Tenggara) Perseftim
	Report

Moh Sarengat Stadium, Batang

Matchday 2 (23 April)
23 April 2025
13:00 UTC+7

Perseftim (East Nusa Tenggara)	2–4	(Central Sulawesi) Celebest
	Report

Moh Sarengat Stadium, Batang
23 April 2025
15:15 UTC+7

Persikomet (Lampung)	0–1	(Central Java) Persibat
	Report

Moh Sarengat Stadium, Batang

Matchday 3 (25 April)
25 April 2025
13:30 UTC+7

Persikomet (Lampung)	2–3	(East Nusa Tenggara) Perseftim
	Report

Hoegeng Stadium, Pekalongan
25 April 2025
13:30 UTC+7

Persibat (Central Java)	4–0	(Central Sulawesi) Celebest
	Report

Moh Sarengat Stadium, Batang

=== Group C ===
All matches will be held at Mandala Krida Stadium, Yogyakarta and Sultan Agung Stadium, Bantul.

Pos	Team	Pld	W	D	L	GF	GA	GD	Pts	Qualification	TBR	CMU	SDQ	PSB
1	(Bengkulu) Tri Brata Rafflesia	3	2	0	1	9	3	+6	6	Qualification to the Second round		1–2	5–0	
2	(West Java) Cimahi United	3	1	2	0	6	5	+1	5	Qualification to the Second round				3–3
3	(West Sulawesi) PS Sandeq	3	1	1	1	2	6	−4	4			1–1		1–0
4	(Bangka Belitung Islands) PS Bangka	3	0	1	2	4	7	−3	1		1–3			

Source: Liga 4 National Phase
Legend: Blue = home team win; Yellow = draw; Red = away team win.
Rules for classification: 1) Points; 2) Head-to-head points; 3) Head-to-head goal difference; 4) Head-to-head goals scored; 5) Goal difference; 6) Goals scored; 7) Fair-play points; 8) Draw.

Group C Matches

Matchday 1 (21 April)
21 April 2025
13:00 UTC+7

PS Bangka (Bangka Belitung Islands)	1–3	(Bengkulu) Tri Brata Rafflesia
	Report

Mandala Krida Stadium, Yogyakarta
21 April 2025
15:15 UTC+7

PS Sandeq (West Sulawesi)	1–1	(West Java) Cimahi United
	Report

Mandala Krida Stadium, Yogyakarta

Matchday 2 (23 April)
23 April 2025
13:00 UTC+7

Cimahi United (West Java)	3–3	(Bangka Belitung Islands) PS Bangka
	Report

Mandala Krida Stadium, Yogyakarta
23 April 2025
15:15 UTC+7

Tri Brata Rafflesia (Bengkulu)	5–0	(West Sulawesi) PS Sandeq
	Report

Mandala Krida Stadium, Yogyakarta

Matchday 3 (25 April)
25 April 2025
15:30 UTC+7

Tri Brata Rafflesia (Bengkulu)	1–2	(West Java) Cimahi United
	Report

Sultan Agung Stadium, Bantul
25 April 2025
15:30 UTC+7

PS Sandeq (West Sulawesi)	1–0	(Bangka Belitung Islands) PS Bangka
	Report

Mandala Krida Stadium, Yogyakarta

=== Group D ===
All matches will be held at Sultan Agung Stadium, Bantul and Mandala Krida Stadium, Yogyakarta.

Pos	Team	Pld	W	D	L	GF	GA	GD	Pts	Qualification	PSC	PGF	LTM	GBS
1	(Banten) Persic	3	3	0	0	7	2	+5	9	Qualification to the Second round		2–1	4–1	
2	(West Papua (province)) Persipegaf	3	2	0	1	7	3	+4	6	Qualification to the Second round				5–1
3	(South Sulawesi) Perslutim	3	0	1	2	2	6	−4	1			0–1		
4	(West Kalimantan) Gabsis	3	0	1	2	2	7	−5	1		0–1		1–1	

Source: Liga 4 National Phase
Legend: Blue = home team win; Yellow = draw; Red = away team win.
Rules for classification: 1) Points; 2) Head-to-head points; 3) Head-to-head goal difference; 4) Head-to-head goals scored; 5) Goal difference; 6) Goals scored; 7) Fair-play points; 8) Draw.

Group D Matches

Matchday 1 (21 April)
21 April 2025
13:00 UTC+7

Persipegaf (West Papua (province))	5–1	(West Kalimantan) Gabsis
	Report

Sultan Agung Stadium, Bantul
21 April 2025
15:15 UTC+7

Persic (Banten)	4–1	(South Sulawesi) Perslutim
	Report

Sultan Agung Stadium, Bantul

Matchday 2 (23 April)
23 April 2025
13:00 UTC+7

Perslutim (South Sulawesi)	0–1	(West Papua (province)) Persipegaf
	Report

Sultan Agung Stadium, Bantul
23 April 2025
15:15 UTC+7

Gabsis (West Kalimantan)	0–1	(Banten) Persic
	Report

Sultan Agung Stadium, Bantul

Matchday 3 (25 April)
25 April 2025
13:30 UTC+7

Gabsis (West Kalimantan)	1–1	(South Sulawesi) Perslutim
	Report

Mandala Krida Stadium, Yogyakarta
25 April 2025
13:30 UTC+7

Persic (Banten)	2–1	(West Papua (province)) Persipegaf
	Report

Sultan Agung Stadium, Bantul

=== Group E ===
All matches will be held at Kebo Giro Stadium, Boyolali and Kota Barat Stadium, Surakarta.

Pos	Team	Pld	W	D	L	GF	GA	GD	Pts	Qualification	PBI	PTR	WHN	DOM
1	(Central Java) Persebi (H)	3	3	0	0	12	1	+11	9	Qualification to the Second round		5–1	1–0	
2	(Jakarta) Persitara	3	2	0	1	7	7	0	6	Qualification to the Second round			3–2	
3	(Riau) Wahana	3	0	1	2	2	4	−2	1					0–0
4	(West Nusa Tenggara) Persidom	3	0	1	2	0	9	−9	1		0–6	0–3		

Source: Liga 4 National Phase
Legend: Blue = home team win; Yellow = draw; Red = away team win.
Rules for classification: 1) Points; 2) Head-to-head points; 3) Head-to-head goal difference; 4) Head-to-head goals scored; 5) Goal difference; 6) Goals scored; 7) Fair-play points; 8) Draw.
(H) Hosts

Group E Matches

Matchday 1 (21 April)
21 April 2025
13:00 UTC+7

Wahana (Riau)	0–0	(West Nusa Tenggara) Persidom
	Report

Kebo Giro Stadium, Boyolali
21 April 2025
15:15 UTC+7

Persebi (Central Java)	5–1	(Jakarta) Persitara
	Report

Kebo Giro Stadium, Boyolali

Matchday 2 (23 April)
23 April 2025
13:30 UTC+7

Persitara (Jakarta)	3–2	(Riau) Wahana
	Report

Kebo Giro Stadium, Boyolali
23 April 2025
15:15 UTC+7

Persidom (West Nusa Tenggara)	0–6	(Central Java) Persebi
	Report

Kebo Giro Stadium, Boyolali

Matchday 3 (25 April)
25 April 2025
15:30 UTC+7

Persidom (West Nusa Tenggara)	0–3	(Jakarta) Persitara
	Report

Kota Barat Stadium, Surakarta
25 April 2025
15:30 UTC+7

Persebi (Central Java)	1–0	(Riau) Wahana
	Report

Kebo Giro Stadium, Boyolali

=== Group F ===
All matches will be held at Angkatan 45 Stadium, Karanganyar and UNS Stadium, Surakarta.

Pos	Team	Pld	W	D	L	GF	GA	GD	Pts	Qualification	PKA	KWA	KLA	PCK
1	(Central Java) Persika Karanganyar (H)	3	3	0	0	15	2	+13	9	Qualification to the Second round		7–1	2–1	
2	(North Sumatra) PS Kwarta	3	2	0	1	7	9	−2	6	Qualification to the Second round			2–0	
3	(North Sulawesi) PS Klabat XIII Jaya Sakti	3	1	0	2	5	5	0	3					4–1
4	(Central Papua) Persipuncak Carstensz	3	0	0	3	3	14	−11	0		0–6	2–4		

Source: Liga 4 National Phase
Legend: Blue = home team win; Yellow = draw; Red = away team win.
Rules for classification: 1) Points; 2) Head-to-head points; 3) Head-to-head goal difference; 4) Head-to-head goals scored; 5) Goal difference; 6) Goals scored; 7) Fair-play points; 8) Draw.
(H) Hosts

Group F Matches

Matchday 1 (21 April)
21 April 2025
13:00 UTC+7

PS Klabat XIII Jaya Sakti (North Sulawesi)	4–1	(Central Papua) Persipuncak Carstensz
	Report

Angkatan 45 Stadium, Karanganyar
21 April 2025
15:15 UTC+7

Persika Karanganyar (Central Java)	7–1	(North Sumatra) PS Kwarta
	Report

Angkatan 45 Stadium, Karanganyar

Matchday 2 (23 April)
23 April 2025
13:00 UTC+7

PS Kwarta (North Sumatra)	2–0	(North Sulawesi) PS Klabat XIII Jaya Sakti
	Report

Angkatan 45 Stadium, Karanganyar
23 April 2025
15:15 UTC+7

Persipuncak Carstensz (Central Papua)	0–6	(Central Java) Persika Karanganyar
	Report

Angkatan 45 Stadium, Karanganyar

Matchday 3 (25 April)
25 April 2025
15:30 UTC+7

Persipuncak Carstensz (Central Papua)	2–4	(North Sumatra) PS Kwarta
	Report

UNS Stadium, Surakarta
25 April 2025
15:30 UTC+7

Persika Karanganyar (Central Java)	2–1	(North Sulawesi) PS Klabat XIII Jaya Sakti
	Report

Angkatan 45 Stadium, Karanganyar

=== Group G ===
All matches will be held at UNS Stadium, Surakarta and Angkatan 45 Stadium, Karanganyar.

Pos	Team	Pld	W	D	L	GF	GA	GD	Pts	Qualification	PMP	BTA	PAL	IDI
1	(East Java) PS Mojokerto Putra	3	2	1	0	8	5	+3	7	Qualification to the Second round			3–1	
2	(East Nusa Tenggara) Bintang Timur Atambua	3	1	1	1	8	7	+1	4	Qualification to the Second round	3–3			2–3
3	(South Sumatra) PS Palembang	3	1	0	2	5	8	−3	3 (Note: Ranked on head-to-head points: PS Palembang 3, Persidi 0.)			1–3		
4	(Aceh) Persidi	3	1	0	2	6	7	−1	3		1–2		2–3	

Source: Liga 4 National Phase
Legend: Blue = home team win; Yellow = draw; Red = away team win.
Rules for classification: 1) Points; 2) Head-to-head points; 3) Head-to-head goal difference; 4) Head-to-head goals scored; 5) Goal difference; 6) Goals scored; 7) Fair-play points; 8) Draw.
Notes:

Group G Matches

Matchday 1 (21 April)
21 April 2025
13:00 UTC+7

PS Palembang (South Sumatra)	1–3	(East Nusa Tenggara) Bintang Timur Atambua
	Report

UNS Stadium, Surakarta
21 April 2025
15:15 UTC+7

Persidi (Aceh)	1–2	(East Java) PS Mojokerto Putra
	Report

UNS Stadium, Surakarta

Matchday 2 (23 April)
23 April 2025
13:00 UTC+7

PS Mojokerto Putra (East Java)	3–1	(South Sumatra) PS Palembang
	Report

UNS Stadium, Surakarta
23 April 2025
15:15 UTC+7

Bintang Timur Atambua (East Nusa Tenggara)	2–3	(Aceh) Persidi
	Report

UNS Stadium, Surakarta

Matchday 3 (25 April)
25 April 2025
13:30 UTC+7

Bintang Timur Atambua (East Nusa Tenggara)	3–3	(East Java) PS Mojokerto Putra
	Report

Angkatan 45 Stadium, Karanganyar
25 April 2025
13:30 UTC+7

Persidi (Aceh)	2–3	(South Sumatra) PS Palembang
	Report

UNS Stadium, Surakarta

=== Group H ===
All matches will be held at Kota Barat Stadium, Surakarta and Kebo Giro Stadium, Boyolali.

Pos	Team	Pld	W	D	L	GF	GA	GD	Pts	Qualification	JOS	PMA	VDR	KOS
1	(West Sumatra) Josal Piaman	3	2	1	0	9	3	+6	7 (Note: Josal Piaman is ahead of Persema in fair-play points with fewer yellow card collections.)	Qualification to the Second round		1–1		5–1
2	(East Java) Persema	3	2	1	0	9	3	+6	7	Qualification to the Second round			3–1	
3	(North Sumatra) Victory Dairi	3	1	0	2	6	9	−3	3		1–3			
4	(Southwest Papua) Persikos	3	0	0	3	5	14	−9	0			1–5	3–4	

Source: Liga 4 National Phase
Legend: Blue = home team win; Yellow = draw; Red = away team win.
Rules for classification: 1) Points; 2) Head-to-head points; 3) Head-to-head goal difference; 4) Head-to-head goals scored; 5) Goal difference; 6) Goals scored; 7) Fair-play points; 8) Draw.
Notes:

Group H Matches

Matchday 1 (21 April)
21 April 2025
13:00 UTC+7

Victory Dairi (North Sumatra)	1–3	(West Sumatra) Josal Piaman
	Report

Kota Barat Stadium, Surakarta
21 April 2025
15:15 UTC+7

Persikos (Southwest Papua)	1–5	(East Java) Persema
	Report

Kota Barat Stadium, Surakarta

Matchday 2 (23 April)
23 April 2025
13:00 UTC+7

Persema (East Java)	3–1	(North Sumatra) Victory Dairi
	Report

Kota Barat Stadium, Surakarta
23 April 2025
15:15 UTC+7

Josal Piaman (West Sumatra)	5–1	(Southwest Papua) Persikos
	Report

Kota Barat Stadium, Surakarta

Matchday 3 (25 April)
25 April 2025
13:30 UTC+7

Josal Piaman (West Sumatra)	1–1	(East Java) Persema
	Report

Kebo Giro Stadium, Boyolali
25 April 2025
13:30 UTC+7

Persikos (Southwest Papua)	3–4	(North Sumatra) Victory Dairi
	Report

Kota Barat Stadium, Surakarta

=== Group I ===
All matches will be held at Ketonggo Stadium, Ngawi and Brawijaya Stadium, Kediri.

Pos	Team	Pld	W	D	L	GF	GA	GD	Pts	Qualification	NGA	PPP	MFC	SYL
1	(East Java) Persinga (H)	3	3	0	0	7	1	+6	9	Qualification to the Second round		2–1		2–0
2	(West Sumatra) PSPP	3	1	1	1	6	3	+3	4	Qualification to the Second round				4–0
3	(South Sulawesi) Mangiwang	3	1	1	1	4	4	0	4		0–3	1–1		
4	(Central Kalimantan) Sylva Kalteng	3	0	0	3	0	9	−9	0				0–3	

Source: Liga 4 National Phase
Legend: Blue = home team win; Yellow = draw; Red = away team win.
Rules for classification: 1) Points; 2) Head-to-head points; 3) Head-to-head goal difference; 4) Head-to-head goals scored; 5) Goal difference; 6) Goals scored; 7) Fair-play points; 8) Draw.
(H) Hosts

Group I Matches

Matchday 1 (22 April)
22 April 2025
13:00 UTC+7

Sylva Kalteng (Central Kalimantan)	0–3	(South Sulawesi) Mangiwang
	Report

Ketonggo Stadium, Ngawi
22 April 2025
15:15 UTC+7

Persinga (East Java)	2–1	(West Sumatra) PSPP
	Report

Ketonggo Stadium, Ngawi

Matchday 2 (24 April)
24 April 2025
13:00 UTC+7

PSPP (West Sumatra)	4–0	(Central Kalimantan) Sylva Kalteng
	Report

Ketonggo Stadium, Ngawi
24 April 2025
15:15 UTC+7

Mangiwang (South Sulawesi)	0–3	(East Java) Persinga
	Report

Ketonggo Stadium, Ngawi

Matchday 3 (26 April)
26 April 2025
15:15 UTC+7

Mangiwang (South Sulawesi)	1–1	(West Sumatra) PSPP
	Report

Brawijaya Stadium, Kediri
26 April 2025
15:15 UTC+7

Persinga (East Java)	2–0	(Central Kalimantan) Sylva Kalteng
	Report

Ketonggo Stadium, Ngawi

=== Group J ===
All matches will be held at Brawijaya Stadium, Kediri and Ketonggo Stadium, Ngawi.

Pos	Team	Pld	W	D	L	GF	GA	GD	Pts	Qualification	BTV	KAS	INK	PSK
1	(Jakarta) Batavia	3	2	1	0	3	0	+3	7	Qualification to the Second round				2–0
2	(West Java) Persikasi	3	1	1	1	3	3	0	4	Qualification to the Second round	0–1			
3	(East Java) Inter Kediri (H)	3	0	3	0	1	1	0	3		0–0	0–0		
4	(West Java) Pesik	3	0	1	2	3	6	−3	1			2–3	1–1	

Source: Liga 4 National Phase
Legend: Blue = home team win; Yellow = draw; Red = away team win.
Rules for classification: 1) Points; 2) Head-to-head points; 3) Head-to-head goal difference; 4) Head-to-head goals scored; 5) Goal difference; 6) Goals scored; 7) Fair-play points; 8) Draw.
(H) Hosts

Group J Matches

Matchday 1 (22 April)
22 April 2025
13:00 UTC+7

Batavia (Jakarta)	2–0	(West Java) Pesik
	Report

Brawijaya Stadium, Kediri
22 April 2025
15:15 UTC+7

Inter Kediri (East Java)	0–0	(West Java) Persikasi
	Report

Brawijaya Stadium, Kediri

Matchday 2 (24 April)
24 April 2025
13:00 UTC+7

Persikasi (West Java)	0–1	(Jakarta) Batavia
	Report

Brawijaya Stadium, Kediri
24 April 2025
15:15 UTC+7

Pesik (West Java)	1–1	(East Java) Inter Kediri
	Report

Brawijaya Stadium, Kediri

Matchday 3 (26 April)
26 April 2025
13:00 UTC+7

Pesik (West Java)	2–3	(West Java) Persikasi
	Report

Ketonggo Stadium, Ngawi
26 April 2025
13:00 UTC+7

Inter Kediri (East Java)	0–0	(Jakarta) Batavia
	Report

Brawijaya Stadium, Kediri

=== Group K ===
All matches will be held at Brantas Stadium, Batu and Gelora Bung Tomo Stadium, Surabaya.

Pos	Team	Pld	W	D	L	GF	GA	GD	Pts	Qualification	ASI	KOB	KMP	KAR
1	(Jakarta) ASIOP	3	2	1	0	3	1	+2	7	Qualification to the Second round		2–1	1–0	
2	(East Java) Persikoba (H)	3	1	1	1	3	3	0	4	Qualification to the Second round			2–1	0–0
3	(South Sumatra) KMP Bumara	3	1	0	2	4	4	0	3					3–1
4	(East Kalimantan) Kartanegara	3	0	2	1	1	3	−2	2		0–0			

Source: Liga 4 National Phase
Legend: Blue = home team win; Yellow = draw; Red = away team win.
Rules for classification: 1) Points; 2) Head-to-head points; 3) Head-to-head goal difference; 4) Head-to-head goals scored; 5) Goal difference; 6) Goals scored; 7) Fair-play points; 8) Draw.
(H) Hosts

Group K Matches

Matchday 1 (22 April)
22 April 2025
13:00 UTC+7

Kartanegara (East Kalimantan)	0–0	(Jakarta) ASIOP
	Report

Brantas Stadium, Batu
22 April 2025
15:15 UTC+7

Persikoba (East Java)	2–1	(South Sumatra) KMP Bumara
	Report

Brantas Stadium, Batu

Matchday 2 (24 April)
24 April 2025
13:00 UTC+7

KMP Bumara (South Sumatra)	3–1	(East Kalimantan) Kartanegara
	Report

Brantas Stadium, Batu
24 April 2025
15:15 UTC+7

ASIOP (Jakarta)	2–1	(East Java) Persikoba
	Report

Brantas Stadium, Batu

Matchday 3 (26 April)
26 April 2025
15:15 UTC+7

ASIOP (Jakarta)	1–0	(South Sumatra) KMP Bumara
	Report

Gelora Bung Tomo Stadium, Surabaya
26 April 2025
15:15 UTC+7

Persikoba (East Java)	0–0	(East Kalimantan) Kartanegara
	Report

Brantas Stadium, Batu

=== Group L ===
All matches will be held at THOR Stadium and Gelora Bung Tomo Stadium in Surabaya, and Brantas Stadium in Batu.

Pos	Team	Pld	W	D	L	GF	GA	GD	Pts	Qualification	MER	SMT	TPN	PAB
1	(South Papua) Persimer	3	2	1	0	8	5	+3	7	Qualification to the Second round			3–3	3–1
2	(East Java) Sang Maestro	3	2	0	1	7	2	+5	6	Qualification to the Second round	1–2			3–0
3	(South Kalimantan) PS Kab. Tapin	3	1	1	1	6	7	−1	4			0–3		
4	(Aceh) PSAB	3	0	0	3	2	9	−7	0				1–3	

Source: Liga 4 National Phase
Legend: Blue = home team win; Yellow = draw; Red = away team win.
Rules for classification: 1) Points; 2) Head-to-head points; 3) Head-to-head goal difference; 4) Head-to-head goals scored; 5) Goal difference; 6) Goals scored; 7) Fair-play points; 8) Draw.

Group L Matches

Matchday 1 (22 April)
22 April 2025
13:00 UTC+7

PS Kab. Tapin (South Kalimantan)	0–3	(East Java) Sang Maestro
	Report

THOR Stadium, Surabaya
22 April 2025
15:15 UTC+7

Persimer (South Papua)	3–1	(Aceh) PSAB
	Report

THOR Stadium, Surabaya

Matchday 2 (24 April)
24 April 2025
13:00 UTC+7

PSAB (Aceh)	1–3	(South Kalimantan) PS Kab. Tapin
	Report

THOR Stadium, Surabaya
24 April 2025
15:15 UTC+7

Sang Maestro (East Java)	1–2	(South Papua) Persimer
	Report

THOR Stadium, Surabaya

Matchday 3 (26 April)
26 April 2025
13:00 UTC+7

Persimer (South Papua)	3–3	(South Kalimantan) PS Kab. Tapin
	Report

Brantas Stadium, Batu
26 April 2025
13:00 UTC+7

Sang Maestro (East Java)	3–0	(Aceh) PSAB
	Report

Gelora Bung Tomo Stadium, Surabaya

=== Group M ===
All matches will be held at Jember Sport Garden Stadium, Jember and Diponegoro Stadium, Banyuwangi.

Pos	Team	Pld	W	D	L	GF	GA	GD	Pts	Qualification	TAL	PBM	KRS	MSU
1	(Gorontalo) Persital	3	2	0	1	8	5	+3	6	Qualification to the Second round			4–0	
2	(West Java) Persikabumi	3	1	1	1	4	4	0	4	Qualification to the Second round	2–3			1–0
3	(Gorontalo) Kreasindo Rajawali Sultan	3	1	1	1	2	5	−3	4			1–1		
4	(East Java) Mitra Surabaya (H)	3	1	0	2	3	3	0	3		3–1		0–1	

Source: Liga 4 National Phase
Legend: Blue = home team win; Yellow = draw; Red = away team win.
Rules for classification: 1) Points; 2) Head-to-head points; 3) Head-to-head goal difference; 4) Head-to-head goals scored; 5) Goal difference; 6) Goals scored; 7) Fair-play points; 8) Draw.
(H) Hosts

Group M Matches

Matchday 1 (22 April)
22 April 2025
13:00 UTC+7

Kreasindo Rajawali Sultan (Gorontalo)	1–1	(West Java) Persikabumi
	Report

Jember Sport Garden Stadium, Jember
22 April 2025
15:15 UTC+7

Mitra Surabaya (East Java)	3–1	(Gorontalo) Persital
	Report

Jember Sport Garden Stadium, Jember

Matchday 2 (24 April)
24 April 2025
13:00 UTC+7

Persital (Gorontalo)	4–0	(Gorontalo) Kreasindo Rajawali Sultan
	Report

Jember Sport Garden Stadium, Jember
24 April 2025
15:15 UTC+7

Persikabumi (West Java)	1–0	(East Java) Mitra Surabaya
	Report

Jember Sport Garden Stadium, Jember

Matchday 3 (26 April)
26 April 2025
15:15 UTC+7

Persikabumi (West Java)	2–3	(Gorontalo) Persital
	Report

Diponegoro Stadium, Banyuwangi
26 April 2025
15:15 UTC+7

Mitra Surabaya (East Java)	0–1	(Gorontalo) Kreasindo Rajawali Sultan
	Report

Jember Sport Garden Stadium, Jember

=== Group N ===
All matches will be held at Diponegoro Stadium, Banyuwangi.

Pos	Team	Pld	W	D	L	GF	GA	GD	Pts	Qualification	PWG	PKU	MWU	CMP
1	(East Java) Persewangi (H)	2	2	0	0	5	1	+4	6	Qualification to the Second round		1–0		
2	(Riau) Pekanbaru	2	0	1	1	1	2	−1	1	Qualification to the Second round			1–1	
3	(West Papua (province)) Manokwari United	2	0	1	1	2	5	−3	1		1–4			
4	(West Java) PS Cimahi Putra (W)	0	0	0	0	0	0	0	0	Withdrew (Note: PS Cimahi Putra withdrew from the competition due to financial problems.)				

Source: Liga 4 National Phase
Legend: Blue = home team win; Yellow = draw; Red = away team win.
Rules for classification: 1) Points; 2) Head-to-head points; 3) Head-to-head goal difference; 4) Head-to-head goals scored; 5) Goal difference; 6) Goals scored; 7) Fair-play points; 8) Draw.
(H) Hosts; (W) Withdrew
Notes:

Group N Matches

Matchday 1 (22 April)
22 April 2025
15:00 UTC+7

Manokwari United (West Papua (province))	1–4	(East Java) Persewangi
	Report

Diponegoro Stadium, Banyuwangi

Matchday 2 (24 April)
24 April 2025
15:00 UTC+7

Pekanbaru (Riau)	1–1	(West Papua (province)) Manokwari United
	Report

Diponegoro Stadium, Banyuwangi

Matchday 3 (26 April)
26 April 2025
13:00 UTC+7

Persewangi (East Java)	1–0	(Riau) Pekanbaru
	Report

Diponegoro Stadium, Banyuwangi

=== Group O ===
All matches will be held at Ngurah Rai Stadium and Kompyang Sujana Stadium, Denpasar.

Pos	Team	Pld	W	D	L	GF	GA	GD	Pts	Qualification	DEN	PRY	PPU	UHO
1	(Bali) Perseden (H)	3	2	1	0	6	1	+5	7	Qualification to the Second round			1–0	0–0
2	(Aceh) PS Peureulak Raya	3	2	0	1	6	7	−1	6	Qualification to the Second round	1–5		4–2	
3	(West Java) Persipu	3	1	0	2	5	7	−2	3					3–2
4	(Southeast Sulawesi) UHO MZF	3	0	1	2	2	4	−2	1			0–1		

Source: Liga 4 National Phase
Legend: Blue = home team win; Yellow = draw; Red = away team win.
Rules for classification: 1) Points; 2) Head-to-head points; 3) Head-to-head goal difference; 4) Head-to-head goals scored; 5) Goal difference; 6) Goals scored; 7) Fair-play points; 8) Draw.
(H) Hosts

Group O Matches

Matchday 1 (22 April)
22 April 2025
15:00 UTC+8

UHO MZF (Southeast Sulawesi)	0–1	(Aceh) PS Peureulak Raya
	Report

Ngurah Rai Stadium, Denpasar
22 April 2025
19:00 UTC+8

Perseden (Bali)	1–0	(West Java) Persipu
	Report

Ngurah Rai Stadium, Denpasar

Matchday 2 (24 April)
24 April 2025
15:00 UTC+8

Persipu (West Java)	3–2	(Southeast Sulawesi) UHO MZF
	Report

Ngurah Rai Stadium, Denpasar
24 April 2025
19:00 UTC+8

PS Peureulak Raya (Aceh)	1–5	(Bali) Perseden
	Report

Ngurah Rai Stadium, Denpasar

Matchday 3 (26 April)
26 April 2025
19:00 UTC+8

PS Peureulak Raya (Aceh)	4–2	(West Java) Persipu
	Report

Kompyang Sujana Stadium, Denpasar
26 April 2025
19:00 UTC+8

Perseden (Bali)	0–0	(Southeast Sulawesi) UHO MZF
	Report

Ngurah Rai Stadium, Denpasar

=== Group P ===
All matches will be held at Kompyang Sujana Stadium and Ngurah Rai Stadium, Denpasar.

Pos	Team	Pld	W	D	L	GF	GA	GD	Pts	Qualification	LBT	PGB	PPM	PML
1	(East Nusa Tenggara) Persebata	3	2	1	0	7	5	+2	7	Qualification to the Second round			2–1	4–3
2	(Highland Papua) Persigubin	3	2	1	0	3	1	+2	7	Qualification to the Second round	1–1			
3	(South Kalimantan) Putra Plaosan Martapura	3	1	0	2	5	3	+2	3			0–1		
4	(North Kalimantan) Persemal	3	0	0	3	3	9	−6	0			0–1	0–4	

Source: Liga 4 National Phase
Legend: Blue = home team win; Yellow = draw; Red = away team win.
Rules for classification: 1) Points; 2) Head-to-head points; 3) Head-to-head goal difference; 4) Head-to-head goals scored; 5) Goal difference; 6) Goals scored; 7) Fair-play points; 8) Draw.

Group P Matches

Matchday 1 (22 April)
22 April 2025
15:00 UTC+8

Persigubin (Highland Papua)	1–1	(East Nusa Tenggara) Persebata
	Report

Kompyang Sujana Stadium, Denpasar
22 April 2025
19:00 UTC+8

Persemal (North Kalimantan)	0–4	(South Kalimantan) Putra Plaosan Martapura
	Report

Kompyang Sujana Stadium, Denpasar

Matchday 2 (24 April)
24 April 2025
15:00 UTC+8

Putra Plaosan Martapura (South Kalimantan)	0–1	(Highland Papua) Persigubin
	Report

Kompyang Sujana Stadium, Denpasar
24 April 2025
19:00 UTC+8

Persebata (East Nusa Tenggara)	4–3	(North Kalimantan) Persemal
	Report

Kompyang Sujana Stadium, Denpasar

Matchday 3 (26 April)
26 April 2025
15:00 UTC+8

Persebata (East Nusa Tenggara)	2–1	(South Kalimantan) Putra Plaosan Martapura
	Report

Ngurah Rai Stadium, Denpasar
26 April 2025
15:00 UTC+8

Persemal (North Kalimantan)	0–1	(Highland Papua) Persigubin
	Report

Kompyang Sujana Stadium, Denpasar

== Second round ==
The 32 teams were divided into 8 groups of four. The second round was played in a home tournament format of single round-robin matches. The top two teams of each group were qualified for the third round.

=== Qualified teams ===
Note: Bolded teams qualified for the third round.

Group	Winners	Runners-up
A	(Central Java) Persip	(Banten) Harin
B	(Central Java) **Persibat**	(Central Sulawesi) **Celebest**
C	(Bengkulu) **Tri Brata Rafflesia**	(West Java) Cimahi United
D	(Banten) **Persic**	(West Papua (province)) Persipegaf
E	(Central Java) Persebi	(Jakarta) **Persitara**
F	(Central Java) **Persika Karanganyar**	(North Sumatra) PS Kwarta
G	(East Java) **PS Mojokerto Putra**	(East Nusa Tenggara) Bintang Timur Atambua
H	(West Sumatra) Josal Piaman	(East Java) **Persema**
I	(East Java) **Persinga**	(West Sumatra) PSPP
J	(Jakarta) **Batavia**	(West Java) Persikasi
K	(Jakarta) ASIOP	(East Java) **Persikoba**
L	(South Papua) Persimer	(East Java) **Sang Maestro**
M	(Gorontalo) Persital	(West Java) Persikabumi
N	(East Java) **Persewangi**	(Riau) **Pekanbaru**
O	(Bali) **Perseden**	(Aceh) PS Peureulak Raya
P	(East Nusa Tenggara) **Persebata**	(Highland Papua) Persigubin

=== Group Q ===
All matches will be held at Mandala Krida Stadium, Yogyakarta and Sultan Agung Stadium, Bantul.

Pos	Team	Pld	W	D	L	GF	GA	GD	Pts	Qualification	TBR	CEL	PSP	PGF
1	(Bengkulu) Tri Brata Rafflesia	3	2	1	0	9	4	+5	**7 (Note: Tri Brata Rafflesia is ahead of Celebest in fair-play points with fewer yellow card collections.)**	Qualification to the Third round			4–1	3–1
2	(Central Sulawesi) Celebest	3	2	1	0	9	4	+5	**7**	Qualification to the Third round	2–2			
3	(Central Java) Persip	3	1	0	2	4	9	−5	**3**			1–4		2–1
4	(West Papua (province)) Persipegaf	3	0	0	3	3	8	−5	**0**			1–3		

Source: Liga 4 National Phase
Legend: Blue = home team win; Yellow = draw; Red = away team win.
Rules for classification: 1) Points; 2) Head-to-head points; 3) Head-to-head goal difference; 4) Head-to-head goals scored; 5) Goal difference; 6) Goals scored; 7) Fair-play points; 8) Draw.
Notes:

Group Q Matches

Matchday 1 (29 April)
29 April 2025
13:00 UTC+7

Celebest (Central Sulawesi)	2–2	(Bengkulu) Tri Brata Rafflesia
	Report

Mandala Krida Stadium, Yogyakarta
29 April 2025
15:15 UTC+7

Persip (Central Java)	2–1	(West Papua (province)) Persipegaf
	Report

Mandala Krida Stadium, Yogyakarta

Matchday 2 (1 May)
1 May 2025
13:00 UTC+7

Persipegaf (West Papua (province))	1–3	(Central Sulawesi) Celebest
	Report

Mandala Krida Stadium, Yogyakarta
1 May 2025
15:15 UTC+7

Tri Brata Rafflesia (Bengkulu)	4–1	(Central Java) Persip
	Report

Mandala Krida Stadium, Yogyakarta

Matchday 3 (3 May)
3 May 2025
13:00 UTC+7

Tri Brata Rafflesia (Bengkulu)	3–1	(West Papua (province)) Persipegaf
	Report

Sultan Agung Stadium, Bantul
3 May 2025
13:00 UTC+7

Persip (Central Java)	1–4	(Central Sulawesi) Celebest
	Report

Mandala Krida Stadium, Yogyakarta

=== Group R ===
All matches will be held at Sultan Agung Stadium, Bantul and Mandala Krida Stadium, Yogyakarta.

Pos	Team	Pld	W	D	L	GF	GA	GD	Pts	Qualification	PBT	PSC	HAR	CMU
1	(Central Java) Persibat	3	2	1	0	5	3	+2	**7**	Qualification to the Third round			3–2	1–0
2	(Banten) Persic	3	1	2	0	8	4	+4	**5**	Qualification to the Third round	1–1			6–2
3	(Banten) Harin	3	1	1	1	5	5	0	**4**			1–1		
4	(West Java) Cimahi United	3	0	0	3	3	9	−6	**0**				1–2	

Source: Liga 4 National Phase
Legend: Blue = home team win; Yellow = draw; Red = away team win.
Rules for classification: 1) Points; 2) Head-to-head points; 3) Head-to-head goal difference; 4) Head-to-head goals scored; 5) Goal difference; 6) Goals scored; 7) Fair-play points; 8) Draw.

Group R Matches

Matchday 1 (29 April)
29 April 2025
13:00 UTC+7

Harin (Banten)	1–1	(Banten) Persic
	Report

Sultan Agung Stadium, Bantul
29 April 2025
15:15 UTC+7

Persibat (Central Java)	1–0	(West Java) Cimahi United
	Report

Sultan Agung Stadium, Bantul

Matchday 2 (1 May)
1 May 2025
13:00 UTC+7

Cimahi United (West Java)	1–2	(Banten) Harin
	Report

Sultan Agung Stadium, Bantul
1 May 2025
15:15 UTC+7

Persic (Banten)	1–1	(Central Java) Persibat
	Report

Sultan Agung Stadium, Bantul

Matchday 3 (3 May)
3 May 2025
15:15 UTC+7

Persic (Banten)	6–2	(West Java) Cimahi United
	Report

Mandala Krida Stadium, Yogyakarta
3 May 2025
15:15 UTC+7

Persibat (Central Java)	3–2	(Banten) Harin
	Report

Sultan Agung Stadium, Bantul

=== Group S ===
All matches will be held at Kebo Giro Stadium, Boyolali and Angkatan 45 Stadium, Karanganyar.

Pos	Team	Pld	W	D	L	GF	GA	GD	Pts	Qualification	PMA	PMP	PBI	KWA
1	(East Java) Persema	3	2	0	1	10	3	+7	**6**	Qualification to the Third round				7–0
2	(East Java) PS Mojokerto Putra	3	1	2	0	2	1	+1	**5**	Qualification to the Third round	2–1		0–0	
3	(Central Java) Persebi (H)	3	1	1	1	5	2	+3	**4**		1–2			4–0
4	(North Sumatra) PS Kwarta	3	0	1	2	0	11	−11	**1**			0–0		

Source: Liga 4 National Phase
Legend: Blue = home team win; Yellow = draw; Red = away team win.
Rules for classification: 1) Points; 2) Head-to-head points; 3) Head-to-head goal difference; 4) Head-to-head goals scored; 5) Goal difference; 6) Goals scored; 7) Fair-play points; 8) Draw.
(H) Hosts

Group S Matches

Matchday 1 (29 April)
29 April 2025
13:00 UTC+7

PS Kwarta (North Sumatra)	0–0	(East Java) PS Mojokerto Putra
	Report

Kebo Giro Stadium, Boyolali
29 April 2025
15:15 UTC+7

Persebi (Central Java)	1–2	(East Java) Persema
	Report

Kebo Giro Stadium, Boyolali

Matchday 2 (1 May)
1 May 2025
13:00 UTC+7

Persema (East Java)	7–0	(North Sumatra) PS Kwarta
	Report

Kebo Giro Stadium, Boyolali
1 May 2025
15:15 UTC+7

PS Mojokerto Putra (East Java)	0–0	(Central Java) Persebi
	Report

Kebo Giro Stadium, Boyolali

Matchday 3 (3 May)
3 May 2025
13:00 UTC+7

PS Mojokerto Putra (East Java)	2–1	(East Java) Persema
	Report

Angkatan 45 Stadium, Karanganyar
3 May 2025
13:00 UTC+7

Persebi (Central Java)	4–0	(North Sumatra) PS Kwarta
	Report

Kebo Giro Stadium, Boyolali

=== Group T ===
All matches will be held at Angkatan 45 Stadium, Karanganyar and Kebo Giro Stadium, Boyolali.

Pos	Team	Pld	W	D	L	GF	GA	GD	Pts	Qualification	PKA	PTR	JOS	BTA
1	(Central Java) Persika Karanganyar (H)	3	3	0	0	12	0	+12	**9**	Qualification to the Third round		4–0		7–0
2	(Jakarta) Persitara	3	1	0	2	5	8	−3	**3 (Note: Tied on head-to-head points. Ranked on head-to-head goal difference: Persitara +1, Josal Piaman 0, Bintang Timur Atambua –1.)**	Qualification to the Third round			4–2	
3	(West Sumatra) Josal Piaman	3	1	0	2	6	7	−1	**3**		0–1			4–2
4	(East Nusa Tenggara) Bintang Timur Atambua	3	1	0	2	4	12	−8	**3**			2–1		

Source: Liga 4 National Phase
Legend: Blue = home team win; Yellow = draw; Red = away team win.
Rules for classification: 1) Points; 2) Head-to-head points; 3) Head-to-head goal difference; 4) Head-to-head goals scored; 5) Goal difference; 6) Goals scored; 7) Fair-play points; 8) Draw.
(H) Hosts
Notes:

Group T Matches

Matchday 1 (29 April)
29 April 2025
13:00 UTC+7

Persitara (Jakarta)	4–2	(West Sumatra) Josal Piaman
	Report

Angkatan 45 Stadium, Karanganyar
29 April 2025
15:15 UTC+7

Persika Karanganyar (Central Java)	7–0	(East Nusa Tenggara) Bintang Timur Atambua
	Report

Angkatan 45 Stadium, Karanganyar

Matchday 2 (1 May)
1 May 2025
13:00 UTC+7

Bintang Timur Atambua (East Nusa Tenggara)	2–1	(Jakarta) Persitara
	Report

Angkatan 45 Stadium, Karanganyar
1 May 2025
15:15 UTC+7

Josal Piaman (West Sumatra)	0–1	(Central Java) Persika Karanganyar
	Report

Angkatan 45 Stadium, Karanganyar

Matchday 3 (3 May)
3 May 2025
15:15 UTC+7

Josal Piaman (West Sumatra)	4–2	(East Nusa Tenggara) Bintang Timur Atambua
	Report

Kebo Giro Stadium, Boyolali
3 May 2025
15:15 UTC+7

Persika Karanganyar (Central Java)	4–0	(Jakarta) Persitara
	Report

Angkatan 45 Stadium, Karanganyar

=== Group U ===
All matches will be held at Ketonggo Stadium, Ngawi and THOR Stadium, Surabaya.

Pos	Team	Pld	W	D	L	GF	GA	GD	Pts	Qualification	SMT	NGA	ASI	KAS
1	(East Java) Sang Maestro	3	1	2	0	5	3	+2	**5**	Qualification to the Third round				2–0
2	(East Java) Persinga (H)	3	1	2	0	5	4	+1	**5**	Qualification to the Third round	2–2			1–1
3	(Jakarta) ASIOP	3	0	2	1	3	4	−1	**2**		1–1	1–2		
4	(West Java) Persikasi	3	0	2	1	2	4	−2	**2**				1–1	

Source: Liga 4 National Phase
Legend: Blue = home team win; Yellow = draw; Red = away team win.
Rules for classification: 1) Points; 2) Head-to-head points; 3) Head-to-head goal difference; 4) Head-to-head goals scored; 5) Goal difference; 6) Goals scored; 7) Fair-play points; 8) Draw.
(H) Hosts

Group U Matches

Matchday 1 (30 April)
30 April 2025
13:00 UTC+7

Persikasi (West Java)	1–1	(Jakarta) ASIOP
	Report

Ketonggo Stadium, Ngawi
30 April 2025
15:15 UTC+7

Persinga (East Java)	2–2	(East Java) Sang Maestro
	Report

Ketonggo Stadium, Ngawi

Matchday 2 (2 May)
2 May 2025
13:30 UTC+7

Sang Maestro (East Java)	2–0	(West Java) Persikasi
	Report

Ketonggo Stadium, Ngawi
2 May 2025
15:30 UTC+7

ASIOP (Jakarta)	1–2	(East Java) Persinga
	Report

Ketonggo Stadium, Ngawi

Matchday 3 (4 May)
4 May 2025
15:15 UTC+7

ASIOP (Jakarta)	1–1	(East Java) Sang Maestro
	Report

THOR Stadium, Surabaya
4 May 2025
15:15 UTC+7

Persinga (East Java)	1–1	(West Java) Persikasi
	Report

Ketonggo Stadium, Ngawi

=== Group V ===
All matches will be held at THOR Stadium, Surabaya and Ketonggo Stadium, Ngawi.

Pos	Team	Pld	W	D	L	GF	GA	GD	Pts	Qualification	BTV	KOB	PPP	MER
1	(Jakarta) Batavia	3	2	0	1	8	5	+3	**6 (Note: Ranked on head-to-head points: Batavia 3, Persikoba 0.)**	Qualification to the Third round		4–1	0–3	
2	(East Java) Persikoba	3	2	0	1	7	6	+1	**6**	Qualification to the Third round			4–1	
3	(West Sumatra) PSPP	3	1	1	1	4	4	0	**4**					0–0
4	(South Papua) Persimer	3	0	1	2	2	6	−4	**1**		1–4	1–2		

Source: Liga 4 National Phase
Legend: Blue = home team win; Yellow = draw; Red = away team win.
Rules for classification: 1) Points; 2) Head-to-head points; 3) Head-to-head goal difference; 4) Head-to-head goals scored; 5) Goal difference; 6) Goals scored; 7) Fair-play points; 8) Draw.
Notes:

Group V Matches

Matchday 1 (30 April)
30 April 2025
13:00 UTC+7

PSPP (West Sumatra)	0–0	(South Papua) Persimer
	Report

THOR Stadium, Surabaya
30 April 2025
15:15 UTC+7

Batavia (Jakarta)	4–1	(East Java) Persikoba
	Report

THOR Stadium, Surabaya

Matchday 2 (2 May)
2 May 2025
13:30 UTC+7

Persikoba (East Java)	4–1	(West Sumatra) PSPP
	Report

THOR Stadium, Surabaya
2 May 2025
15:30 UTC+7

Persimer (South Papua)	1–4	(Jakarta) Batavia
	Report

THOR Stadium, Surabaya

Matchday 3 (4 May)
4 May 2025
13:00 UTC+7

Persimer (South Papua)	1–2	(East Java) Persikoba
	Report

Ketonggo Stadium, Ngawi
4 May 2025
13:00 UTC+7

Batavia (Jakarta)	0–3	(West Sumatra) PSPP
	Report

THOR Stadium, Surabaya

=== Group W ===
All matches will be held at Ngurah Rai Stadium and Kompyang Sujana Stadium, Denpasar.

Pos	Team	Pld	W	D	L	GF	GA	GD	Pts	Qualification	DEN	PKU	PGB	TAL
1	(Bali) Perseden (H)	3	2	1	0	6	1	+5	**7**	Qualification to the Third round			1–1	3–0
2	(Riau) Pekanbaru	3	2	0	1	6	2	+4	**6**	Qualification to the Third round	0–2			
3	(Highland Papua) Persigubin	3	1	1	1	3	2	+1	**4**			0–1		
4	(Gorontalo) Persital	3	0	0	3	0	10	−10	**0**			0–5	0–2	

Source: Liga 4 National Phase
Legend: Blue = home team win; Yellow = draw; Red = away team win.
Rules for classification: 1) Points; 2) Head-to-head points; 3) Head-to-head goal difference; 4) Head-to-head goals scored; 5) Goal difference; 6) Goals scored; 7) Fair-play points; 8) Draw.
(H) Hosts

Group W Matches

Matchday 1 (30 April)
30 April 2025
15:00 UTC+8

Persital (Gorontalo)	0–2	(Highland Papua) Persigubin
	Report

Ngurah Rai Stadium, Denpasar
30 April 2025
19:00 UTC+8

Pekanbaru (Riau)	0–2	(Bali) Perseden
	Report

Ngurah Rai Stadium, Denpasar

Matchday 2 (2 May)
2 May 2025
15:00 UTC+8

Persigubin (Highland Papua)	0–1	(Riau) Pekanbaru
	Report

Ngurah Rai Stadium, Denpasar
2 May 2025
19:00 UTC+8

Perseden (Bali)	3–0	(Gorontalo) Persital
	Report

Ngurah Rai Stadium, Denpasar

Matchday 3 (4 May)
4 May 2025
19:00 UTC+8

Persital (Gorontalo)	0–5	(Riau) Pekanbaru
	Report

Kompyang Sujana Stadium, Denpasar
4 May 2025
19:00 UTC+8

Perseden (Bali)	1–1	(Highland Papua) Persigubin
	Report

Ngurah Rai Stadium, Denpasar

=== Group X ===
All matches will be held at Kompyang Sujana Stadium and Ngurah Rai Stadium, Denpasar.

Pos	Team	Pld	W	D	L	GF	GA	GD	Pts	Qualification	LBT	PWG	PRY	PBM
1	(East Nusa Tenggara) Persebata	3	2	1	0	5	1	+4	**7**	Qualification to the Third round		2–0	1–1	
2	(East Java) Persewangi	3	2	0	1	8	5	+3	**6**	Qualification to the Third round			4–1	4–2
3	(Aceh) PS Peureulak Raya	3	1	1	1	6	7	−1	**4**					4–2
4	(West Java) Persikabumi	3	0	0	3	4	10	−6	**0**		0–2			

Source: Liga 4 National Phase
Legend: Blue = home team win; Yellow = draw; Red = away team win.
Rules for classification: 1) Points; 2) Head-to-head points; 3) Head-to-head goal difference; 4) Head-to-head goals scored; 5) Goal difference; 6) Goals scored; 7) Fair-play points; 8) Draw.

Group X Matches

Matchday 1 (30 April)
30 April 2025
15:00 UTC+8

Persikabumi (West Java)	0–2	(East Nusa Tenggara) Persebata
	Report

Kompyang Sujana Stadium, Denpasar
30 April 2025
19:00 UTC+8

Persewangi (East Java)	4–1	(Aceh) PS Peureulak Raya
	Report

Kompyang Sujana Stadium, Denpasar

Matchday 2 (2 May)
2 May 2025
15:00 UTC+8

PS Peureulak Raya (Aceh)	4–2	(West Java) Persikabumi
	Report

Kompyang Sujana Stadium, Denpasar
2 May 2025
22:00 UTC+8 (Note: The match was originally scheduled to be held at Kompyang Sujana Stadium at 19:00 WITA, but was relocated to Ngurah Rai Stadium and kicked off at 22:00 WITA on the same day due to an electrical issue at the original venue.)

Persebata (East Nusa Tenggara)	2–0	(East Java) Persewangi
	Report

Ngurah Rai Stadium, Denpasar

Matchday 3 (4 May)
4 May 2025
15:00 UTC+8

Persebata (East Nusa Tenggara)	1–1	(Aceh) PS Peureulak Raya
	Report

Ngurah Rai Stadium, Denpasar
4 May 2025
15:00 UTC+8

Persewangi (East Java)	4–2	(West Java) Persikabumi
	Report

Kompyang Sujana Stadium, Denpasar

== Third round ==
The 16 teams will be drawn into 4 groups of four. The third round will be played in a home tournament format of single round-robin matches.

The top two teams of each group will qualify for the fourth round and promoted to 2025–26 Liga Nusantara.

=== Qualified teams ===
Note: Bolded teams qualified for the fourth round and promoted to 2025–26 Liga Nusantara.

Group	Winners	Runners-up
Q	(Bengkulu) **Tri Brata Rafflesia**	(Central Sulawesi) Celebest
R	(Central Java) Persibat	(Banten) Persic
S	(East Java) Persema	(East Java) PS Mojokerto Putra
T	(Central Java) **Persika Karanganyar**	(Jakarta) **Persitara**
U	(East Java) **Sang Maestro**	(East Java) Persinga
V	(Jakarta) **Batavia**	(East Java) Persikoba
W	(Bali) **Perseden**	(Riau) **Pekanbaru**
X	(East Nusa Tenggara) **Persebata**	(East Java) Persewangi

=== Group A ===
All matches will be held at Mandala Krida Stadium, Yogyakarta and Sultan Agung Stadium, Bantul.

Pos	Team	Pld	W	D	L	GF	GA	GD	Pts	Promotion or qualification	PTR	BTV	PMP	PBT
1	(Jakarta) Persitara (P)	3	2	0	1	2	2	0	**6**	Promotion to the 2025–26 Liga Nusantara and qualification to the Fourth round			1–0	1–0
2	(Jakarta) Batavia (P)	3	1	2	0	6	4	+2	**5**	Promotion to the 2025–26 Liga Nusantara and qualification to the Fourth round	2–0			
3	(East Java) PS Mojokerto Putra	3	1	1	1	5	5	0	**4**			3–3		
4	(Central Java) Persibat	3	0	1	2	2	4	−2	**1**			1–1	1–2	

Source: Liga 4 National Phase
Legend: Blue = home team win; Yellow = draw; Red = away team win.
Rules for classification: 1) Points; 2) Head-to-head points; 3) Head-to-head goal difference; 4) Head-to-head goals scored; 5) Goal difference; 6) Goals scored; 7) Fair-play points; 8) Draw.
(P) Promoted

Group A Matches

Matchday 1 (10 May)
10 May 2025
13:00 UTC+7

Persibat (Central Java)	1–2	(East Java) PS Mojokerto Putra
	Report

Mandala Krida Stadium, Yogyakarta
10 May 2025
15:15 UTC+7

Batavia (Jakarta)	2–0	(Jakarta) Persitara
	Report

Mandala Krida Stadium, Yogyakarta

Matchday 2 (12 May)
12 May 2025
13:00 UTC+7

PS Mojokerto Putra (East Java)	3–3	(Jakarta) Batavia
	Report

Mandala Krida Stadium, Yogyakarta
12 May 2025
15:15 UTC+7

Persitara (Jakarta)	1–0	(Central Java) Persibat
	Report

Mandala Krida Stadium, Yogyakarta

Matchday 3 (14 May)
14 May 2025
13:00 UTC+7

Persitara (Jakarta)	1–0	(East Java) PS Mojokerto Putra
	Report

Sultan Agung Stadium, Bantul
14 May 2025
13:00 UTC+7

Persibat (Central Java)	1–1	(Jakarta) Batavia
	Report

Mandala Krida Stadium, Yogyakarta

=== Group B ===
All matches will be held at Sultan Agung Stadium, Bantul and Mandala Krida Stadium, Yogyakarta.

Pos	Team	Pld	W	D	L	GF	GA	GD	Pts	Promotion or qualification	PKA	LBT	PSC	PWG
1	(Central Java) Persika Karanganyar (P)	3	1	2	0	5	2	+3	**5 (Note: Tied on head-to-head points and head-to-head goal difference. Ranked on head-to-head goals scored: Persika Karanganyar 1, Persebata 1, Persic 0.)**	Promotion to the 2025–26 Liga Nusantara and qualification to the Fourth round		1–1		4–1
2	(East Nusa Tenggara) Persebata (P)	3	1	2	0	3	1	+2	**5**	Promotion to the 2025–26 Liga Nusantara and qualification to the Fourth round			0–0	
3	(Banten) Persic	3	1	2	0	4	2	+2	**5**		0–0			4–2
4	(East Java) Persewangi	3	0	0	3	3	10	−7	**0**			0–2		

Source: Liga 4 National Phase
Legend: Blue = home team win; Yellow = draw; Red = away team win.
Rules for classification: 1) Points; 2) Head-to-head points; 3) Head-to-head goal difference; 4) Head-to-head goals scored; 5) Goal difference; 6) Goals scored; 7) Fair-play points; 8) Draw.
(P) Promoted
Notes:

Group B Matches

Matchday 1 (10 May)
10 May 2025
13:00 UTC+7

Persika Karanganyar (Central Java)	4–1	(East Java) Persewangi
	Report

Sultan Agung Stadium, Bantul
10 May 2025
15:15 UTC+7

Persebata (East Nusa Tenggara)	0–0	(Banten) Persic
	Report

Sultan Agung Stadium, Bantul

Matchday 2 (12 May)
12 May 2025
13:00 UTC+7

Persewangi (East Java)	0–2	(East Nusa Tenggara) Persebata
	Report

Sultan Agung Stadium, Bantul
12 May 2025
15:15 UTC+7

Persic (Banten)	0–0	(Central Java) Persika Karanganyar
	Report

Sultan Agung Stadium, Bantul

Matchday 3 (14 May)
14 May 2025
15:15 UTC+7

Persic (Banten)	4–2	(East Java) Persewangi
	Report

Mandala Krida Stadium, Yogyakarta
14 May 2025
15:15 UTC+7

Persika Karanganyar (Central Java)	1–1	(East Nusa Tenggara) Persebata
	Report

Sultan Agung Stadium, Bantul

=== Group C ===
All matches will be held at Kota Barat Stadium and UNS Stadium, Surakarta.

Pos	Team	Pld	W	D	L	GF	GA	GD	Pts	Promotion or qualification	TBR	SMT	NGA	CEL
1	(Bengkulu) Tri Brata Rafflesia (P)	3	2	0	1	4	3	+1	**6**	Promotion to the 2025–26 Liga Nusantara and qualification to the Fourth round			2–1	
2	(East Java) Sang Maestro (P)	3	1	2	0	2	1	+1	**5**	Promotion to the 2025–26 Liga Nusantara and qualification to the Fourth round	1–0			1–1
3	(East Java) Persinga	3	1	1	1	2	2	0	**4**			0–0		1–0
4	(Central Sulawesi) Celebest	3	0	1	2	2	4	−2	**1**		1–2			

Source: Liga 4 National Phase
Legend: Blue = home team win; Yellow = draw; Red = away team win.
Rules for classification: 1) Points; 2) Head-to-head points; 3) Head-to-head goal difference; 4) Head-to-head goals scored; 5) Goal difference; 6) Goals scored; 7) Fair-play points; 8) Draw.
(P) Promoted

Group C Matches

Matchday 1 (11 May)
11 May 2025
13:00 UTC+7

Sang Maestro (East Java)	1–1	(Central Sulawesi) Celebest
	Report

Kota Barat Stadium, Surakarta
11 May 2025
15:15 UTC+7

Tri Brata Rafflesia (Bengkulu)	2–1	(East Java) Persinga
	Report

Kota Barat Stadium, Surakarta

Matchday 2 (13 May)
13 May 2025
13:00 UTC+7

Celebest (Central Sulawesi)	1–2	(Bengkulu) Tri Brata Rafflesia
	Report

Kota Barat Stadium, Surakarta
13 May 2025
15:15 UTC+7

Persinga (East Java)	0–0	(East Java) Sang Maestro
	Report

Kota Barat Stadium, Surakarta

Matchday 3 (15 May)
15 May 2025
13:00 UTC+7

Persinga (East Java)	1–0	(Central Sulawesi) Celebest
	Report

UNS Stadium, Surakarta
15 May 2025
13:00 UTC+7

Sang Maestro (East Java)	1–0	(Bengkulu) Tri Brata Rafflesia
	Report

Kota Barat Stadium, Surakarta

=== Group D ===
All matches will be held at UNS Stadium and Kota Barat Stadium, Surakarta.

Pos	Team	Pld	W	D	L	GF	GA	GD	Pts	Promotion or qualification	PKU	DEN	KOB	PMA
1	(Riau) Pekanbaru (P)	3	2	1	0	5	0	+5	**7**	Promotion to the 2025–26 Liga Nusantara and qualification to the Fourth round		2–0	0–0	
2	(Bali) Perseden (P)	3	2	0	1	3	3	0	**6**	Promotion to the 2025–26 Liga Nusantara and qualification to the Fourth round			1–0	2–1
3	(East Java) Persikoba	3	1	1	1	2	1	+1	**4**					2–0
4	(East Java) Persema	3	0	0	3	1	7	−6	**0**		0–3			

Source: Liga 4 National Phase
Legend: Blue = home team win; Yellow = draw; Red = away team win.
Rules for classification: 1) Points; 2) Head-to-head points; 3) Head-to-head goal difference; 4) Head-to-head goals scored; 5) Goal difference; 6) Goals scored; 7) Fair-play points; 8) Draw.
(P) Promoted

Group D Matches

Matchday 1 (11 May)
11 May 2025
13:00 UTC+7

Perseden (Bali)	1–0	(East Java) Persikoba
	Report

UNS Stadium, Surakarta
11 May 2025
15:15 UTC+7

Persema (East Java)	0–3	(Riau) Pekanbaru
	Report

UNS Stadium, Surakarta

Matchday 2 (13 May)
13 May 2025
13:00 UTC+7

Persikoba (East Java)	2–0	(East Java) Persema
	Report

UNS Stadium, Surakarta
13 May 2025
15:15 UTC+7

Pekanbaru (Riau)	2–0	(Bali) Perseden
	Report

UNS Stadium, Surakarta

Matchday 3 (15 May)
15 May 2025
15:15 UTC+7

Pekanbaru (Riau)	0–0	(East Java) Persikoba
	Report

Kota Barat Stadium, Surakarta
15 May 2025
15:15 UTC+7

Perseden (Bali)	2–1	(East Java) Persema
	Report

UNS Stadium, Surakarta

== Fourth round ==
The 8 teams will be drawn into two groups of four. The fourth round will be played in a home tournament format of single round-robin matches.

The winner of each group will qualify for the final.

=== Qualified teams ===
Note: Bolded teams qualified for the final.

Group	Winners	Runners-up
A	(Jakarta) Persitara	(Jakarta) Batavia
B	(Central Java) **Persika Karanganyar**	(East Nusa Tenggara) Persebata
C	(Bengkulu) **Tri Brata Rafflesia**	(East Java) Sang Maestro
D	(Riau) Pekanbaru	(Bali) Perseden

=== Group A ===
All matches will be held at Kota Barat Stadium and Sriwedari Stadium, Surakarta.

Pos	Team	Pld	W	D	L	GF	GA	GD	Pts	Qualification	TBR	LBT	DEN	PTR
1	(Bengkulu) Tri Brata Rafflesia	3	1	2	0	5	2	+3	**5**	Qualification to the Final			1–1	3–0
2	(East Nusa Tenggara) Persebata	3	0	3	0	4	4	0	**3**		1–1			
3	(Bali) Perseden	3	0	3	0	3	3	0	**3**			1–1		
4	(Jakarta) Persitara	3	0	2	1	3	6	−3	**2**			2–2	1–1	

Source: Liga 4 National Phase
Legend: Blue = home team win; Yellow = draw; Red = away team win.
Rules for classification: 1) Points; 2) Head-to-head points; 3) Head-to-head goal difference; 4) Head-to-head goals scored; 5) Goal difference; 6) Goals scored; 7) Fair-play points; 8) Draw.

Group A Matches

Matchday 1 (20 May)
20 May 2025
13:00 UTC+7

Persitara (Jakarta)	1–1	(Bali) Perseden
	Report

Kota Barat Stadium, Surakarta
20 May 2025
15:15 UTC+7

Persebata (East Nusa Tenggara)	1–1	(Bengkulu) Tri Brata Rafflesia
	Report

Kota Barat Stadium, Surakarta

Matchday 2 (22 May)
22 May 2025
13:00 UTC+7

Perseden (Bali)	1–1	(East Nusa Tenggara) Persebata
	Report

Kota Barat Stadium, Surakarta
22 May 2025
15:15 UTC+7

Tri Brata Rafflesia (Bengkulu)	3–0	(Jakarta) Persitara
	Report

Kota Barat Stadium, Surakarta

Matchday 3 (24 May)
24 May 2025
13:00 UTC+7

Persitara (Jakarta)	2–2	(East Nusa Tenggara) Persebata
	Report

Kota Barat Stadium, Surakarta
24 May 2025
13:00 UTC+7

Tri Brata Rafflesia (Bengkulu)	1–1	(Bali) Perseden
	Report

Sriwedari Stadium, Surakarta

=== Group B ===
All matches will be held at Sriwedari Stadium and Kota Barat Stadium, Surakarta.

Pos	Team	Pld	W	D	L	GF	GA	GD	Pts	Qualification	PKA	PKU	BTV	SMT
1	(Central Java) Persika Karanganyar	3	3	0	0	7	3	+4	**9**	Qualification to the Final				3–1
2	(Riau) Pekanbaru	3	1	0	2	6	6	0	**3 (Note: Tied on head-to-head points. Ranked on head-to-head goal difference: Pekanbaru +1, Batavia +1, Sang Maestro –2.)**		1–2			
3	(Jakarta) Batavia	3	1	0	2	4	4	0	**3**		1–2	3–1		
4	(East Java) Sang Maestro	3	1	0	2	3	7	−4	**3**			1–4	1–0	

Source: Liga 4 National Phase
Legend: Blue = home team win; Yellow = draw; Red = away team win.
Rules for classification: 1) Points; 2) Head-to-head points; 3) Head-to-head goal difference; 4) Head-to-head goals scored; 5) Goal difference; 6) Goals scored; 7) Fair-play points; 8) Draw.
Notes:

Group B Matches

Matchday 1 (20 May)
20 May 2025
13:00 UTC+7

Batavia (Jakarta)	3–1	(Riau) Pekanbaru
	Report

Sriwedari Stadium, Surakarta
20 May 2025
15:15 UTC+7

Persika Karanganyar (Central Java)	3–1	(East Java) Sang Maestro
	Report

Sriwedari Stadium, Surakarta

Matchday 2 (22 May)
22 May 2025
13:00 UTC+7

Pekanbaru (Riau)	1–2	(Central Java) Persika Karanganyar
	Report

Sriwedari Stadium, Surakarta
22 May 2025
15:15 UTC+7

Sang Maestro (East Java)	1–0	(Jakarta) Batavia
	Report

Sriwedari Stadium, Surakarta

Matchday 3 (24 May)
24 May 2025
15:15 UTC+7

Batavia (Jakarta)	1–2	(Central Java) Persika Karanganyar
	Report

Sriwedari Stadium, Surakarta
24 May 2025
15:15 UTC+7

Sang Maestro (East Java)	1–4	(Riau) Pekanbaru
	Report

Kota Barat Stadium, Surakarta

== Final ==
The final will be played as a single match. If tied after regulation time, extra time and, if necessary, a penalty shoot-out will be used to decide the winning team.

27 May 2025
15:00 UTC+7

Persika Karanganyar (Central Java)	2–3	(Bengkulu) Tri Brata Rafflesia
Fauzan 44' (pen.); Mubarak 85'	Report	12', 18' Iqbal; 71' Jaenuar

Manahan Stadium, Surakarta
Referee: Yeni Krisdianto

== See also ==
- 2024–25 Liga 4
