= 2025 Liga 4 final =

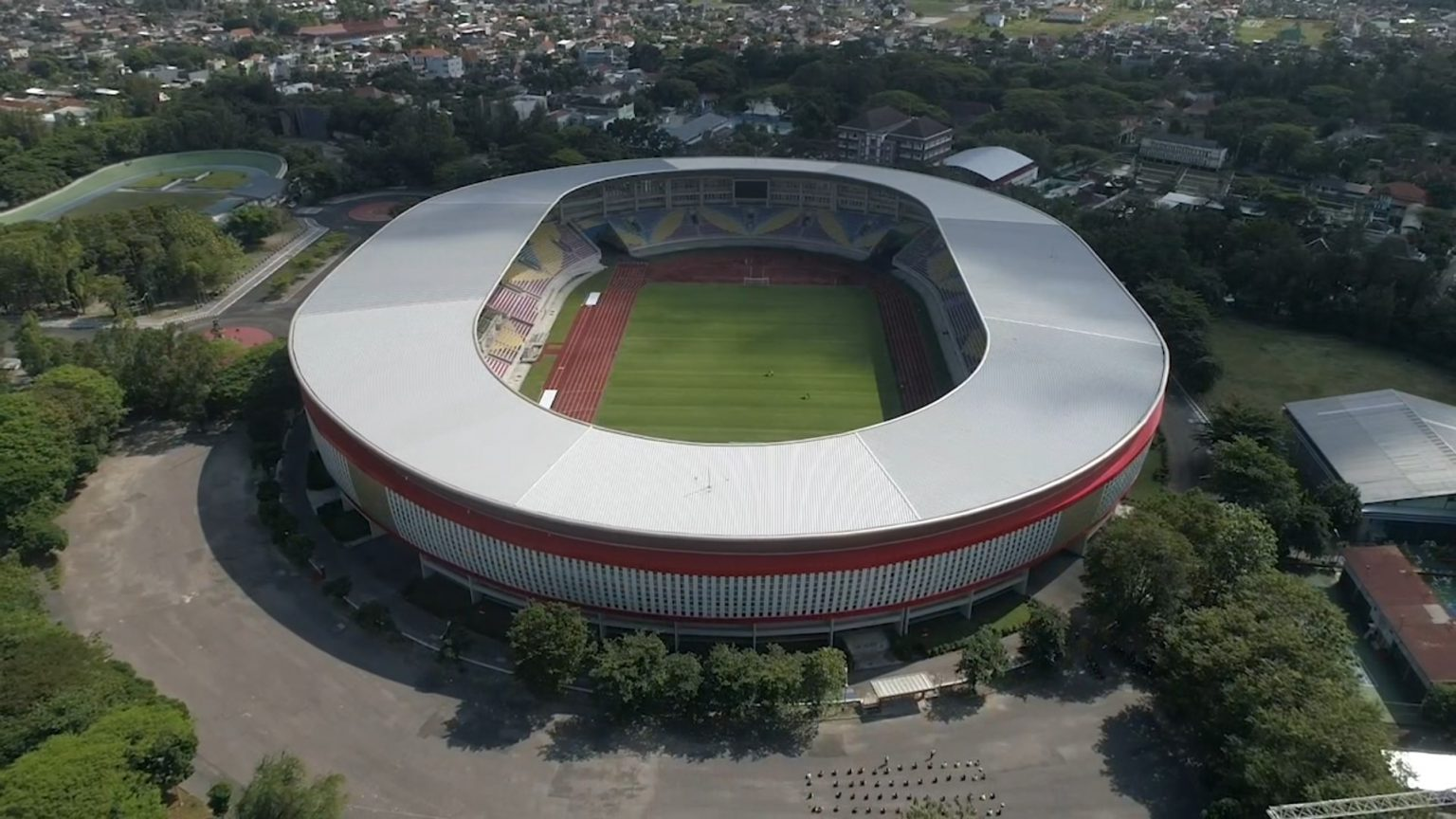
- The final match was held at Manahan Stadium
- Event: 2024–25 Liga 4
Persika Karanganyar (Central Java)	Tri Brata Rafflesia (Bengkulu)
2	3
- Date: 27 May 2025
- Venue: Manahan Stadium, Surakarta
- Referee: Yeni Krisdianto

The 2025 Liga 4 final was the final match of the 2024–25 Liga 4, the inaugural season of the fourth-tier competition in Indonesia under the current league structure organised by PSSI. It was held at the Manahan Stadium in Surakarta, Central Java on 27 May 2025.

== Background ==
=== Persika Karanganyar ===
Since its establishment, Persika Karanganyar has never reached the final of a fourth-tier league, making this season their best ever.

In this season Persika Karanganyar was successfully promoted to the 2025–26 Liga Nusantara, and will be marking their return to the third-tier after last competing at that level in the 2023–24 Liga 3, where they only played in the Central Java provincial league and did not qualify for the national phase.

=== Tri Brata Rafflesia ===
Since its establishment, Tri Brata Rafflesia has never reached the final of a fourth-tier league.

In this season Tri Brata Rafflesia was successfully promoted to the 2025–26 Liga Nusantara, and will be marking their return to the third-tier after last competing at that level in the 2023–24 Liga 3, where they reached the national phase second round.

== Route to the final ==
Persika Karanganyar
Round
Tri Brata Rafflesia
Provincial phase
Opponents
Result
Matchdays
Opponents
Result
Persipur
2–0 (H)
Matchday 1
Matchday 1
Mutu
9–0
Persebi
1–2 (A)
Matchday 2
Matchday 2
Persipa Bengkulu
10–0
PPSM
2–0 (A)
Matchday 3
Matchday 3
Tunas Muda
9–0
Persiharjo
1–0 (H)
Matchday 4
Matchday 4
Bengkulu Putra
5–1
PSIR
3–0 (A)
Matchday 5
Matchday 5
Religius
9–0
Persipur
3–0 (A)
Matchday 6
Final standings
2024–25 Liga 4 Bengkulu champions

Pos	Team	Pld	Pts
1	Tri Brata Rafflesia (C)	5	15
2	Bengkulu Putra	5	10
3	Tunas Muda	5	7
4	Persipa Bengkulu	5	7
5	Religius	5	4

Source: Liga 4 Bengkulu
(C) Champions
Persebi
1–0 (H)
Matchday 7
PPSM
1–1 (H)
Matchday 8
Persiharjo
1–2 (A)
Matchday 9
PSIR
7–0 (H)
Matchday 10
Persak
4–2 (H)
Quarter-finals
Persak
1–2 (A)
Quarter-finals
Persibat
1–1 (A)
Semi-finals
Persibat
3–1 (H)
Semi-finals
Persebi
0–1
Final
2024–25 Liga 4 Central Java runner-up
Final result
National phase
Opponents
Result
First round
Opponents
Result
PS Kwarta
7–1
Matchday 1
PS Bangka
3–1
Persipuncak Carstensz
6–0
Matchday 2
PS Sandeq
5–0
PS Klabat XIII Jaya Sakti
2–1
Matchday 3
Cimahi United
1–2
Group F winner

Pos	Team	Pld	Pts
1	(Central Java) Persika Karanganyar (H)	3	9
2	(North Sumatra) PS Kwarta	3	6
3	(North Sulawesi) PS Klabat XIII Jaya Sakti	3	3
4	(Central Papua) Persipuncak Carstensz	3	0

Source: Liga 4 National Phase
(H) Hosts
Final standings
Group C winner

Pos	Team	Pld	Pts
1	(Bengkulu) Tri Brata Rafflesia	3	6
2	(West Java) Cimahi United	3	5
3	(West Sulawesi) PS Sandeq	3	4
4	(Bangka Belitung Islands) PS Bangka	3	1

Source: Liga 4 National Phase
Opponents
Result
Second round
Opponents
Result
Bintang Timur Atambua
7–0
Matchday 1
Celebest
2–2
Josal Piaman
1–0
Matchday 2
Persip
4–1
Persitara
4–0
Matchday 3
Persipegaf
3–1
Group T winner

Pos	Team	Pld	Pts
1	(Central Java) Persika Karanganyar (H)	3	9
2	(Jakarta) Persitara	3	3
3	(West Sumatra) Josal Piaman	3	3
4	(East Nusa Tenggara) Bintang Timur Atambua	3	3

Source: Liga 4 National Phase
(H) Hosts
Final standings
Group Q winner

Pos	Team	Pld	Pts
1	(Bengkulu) Tri Brata Rafflesia	3	7
2	(Central Sulawesi) Celebest	3	7
3	(Central Java) Persip	3	3
4	(West Papua (province)) Persipegaf	3	0

Source: Liga 4 National Phase
Opponents
Result
Third round
Opponents
Result
Persewangi
4–1
Matchday 1
Persinga
2–1
Persic
0–0
Matchday 2
Celebest
2–1
Persebata
1–1
Matchday 3
Sang Maestro
0–1
Group B winner

Pos	Team	Pld	Pts
1	(Central Java) Persika Karanganyar (P)	3	5
2	(East Nusa Tenggara) Persebata (P)	3	5
3	(Banten) Persic	3	5
4	(East Java) Persewangi	3	0

Source: Liga 4 National Phase
(P) Promoted
Final standings
Group C winner

Pos	Team	Pld	Pts
1	(Bengkulu) Tri Brata Rafflesia (P)	3	6
2	(East Java) Sang Maestro (P)	3	5
3	(East Java) Persinga	3	4
4	(Central Sulawesi) Celebest	3	1

Source: Liga 4 National Phase
(P) Promoted
Opponents
Result
Fourth round
Opponents
Result
Sang Maestro
3–1
Matchday 1
Persebata
1–1
Pekanbaru
2–1
Matchday 2
Persitara
3–0
Batavia
2–1
Matchday 3
Perseden
1–1
Group B winner

Pos	Team	Pld	Pts
1	(Central Java) Persika Karanganyar	3	9
2	(Riau) Pekanbaru	3	3
3	(Jakarta) Batavia	3	3
4	(East Java) Sang Maestro	3	3

Source: Liga 4 National Phase
Final standings
Group A winner

Pos	Team	Pld	Pts
1	(Bengkulu) Tri Brata Rafflesia	3	5
2	(East Nusa Tenggara) Persebata	3	3
3	(Bali) Perseden	3	3
4	(Jakarta) Persitara	3	2

Source: Liga 4 National Phase

== Format ==
The final will be played as a single match. If tied after regulation time, extra time and, if necessary, a penalty shoot-out will be used to decide the winning team.

== Match ==
27 May 2025
15:00 UTC+7

Persika Karanganyar (Central Java)	2–3	(Bengkulu) Tri Brata Rafflesia
Fauzan 44' (pen.); Mubarak 85'	Report	12', 18' Iqbal; 71' Jaenuar

Manahan Stadium, Surakarta
Referee: Yeni Krisdianto

Persika Karanganyar	Tri Brata Rafflesia

GK	90	(Indonesia) Aryandy
DF	16	(Indonesia) Aan Priyono (c)
DF	3	(Indonesia) Aan Aris
DF	21	(Indonesia) Roydhatul
DF	15	(Indonesia) Rio
MF	28	(Indonesia) Iqbal
MF	88	(Indonesia) Tri Wibowo
MF	18	(Indonesia) Arlan
FW	11	(Indonesia) Khoirul Anam
FW	9	(Indonesia) Haidar
FW	91	(Indonesia) Rizqi Fauzan
Substitutions:
GK	1	(Indonesia) Nur Ikhsan
MF	6	(Indonesia) Dzira
FW	7	(Indonesia) Gilang Jati
MF	8	(Indonesia) Yogiek
DF	19	(Indonesia) Ibnul Mubarak
DF	22	(Indonesia) Francoies
DF	56	(Indonesia) Dimas
DF	79	(Indonesia) Adji
MF	80	(Indonesia) Effendi
FW	99	(Indonesia) Risky Sena
Manager:
(Indonesia) Slamet Riyadi

GK	20	(Indonesia) Fahrison
DF	4	(Indonesia) Doni
DF	5	(Indonesia) Ari Adha
DF	19	(Indonesia) Angger
DF	2	(Indonesia) Fajar
MF	14	(Indonesia) Afri Age
MF	6	(Indonesia) Dedy
MF	15	(Indonesia) Richo
FW	8	(Indonesia) Bayu (c)
FW	17	(Indonesia) Yahya
FW	11	(Indonesia) Iqbal
Substitutions:
GK	1	(Indonesia) Arya
		(Indonesia) Rivaldo
MF	3	(Indonesia) Rio
FW	7	(Indonesia) Rendi
FW	10	(Indonesia) Ariesta
FW	12	(Indonesia) Ziyad
DF	16	(Indonesia) Zaim
DF	18	(Indonesia) Adriansyah
DF	22	(Indonesia) Seno Ajie
MF	24	(Indonesia) Falencio
Manager:
(Indonesia) M. Nasir

Assistant referees:
Arwan Pangestu
Satrio Susilo
Fourth official:
Arfandi Abdullah

Match rules

- 90 minutes
- 30 minutes of extra time if tied after normal time
- Penalty shoot-out if still tied after extra time
- Ten named substitutes, of which up to five may be used, with a sixth allowed in extra time.

== See also ==
- 2024–25 Liga 4
