= Ambrizal =

Indonesian professional footballer

Personal information
- Full name: Ambrizal Ammar
- Date of birth: 1 February 1981 (age 45)
- Place of birth: Kuantan Singingi, Indonesia
- Height: 1.83 m (6 ft 0 in)
- Position: Centre-back

Team information
- Current team: PSPS Riau (Assistant coach)

Senior career*
Years	Team	Apps	(Gls)
2004−2005	PSPS Pekanbaru	23	(2)
2006–2007	Semen Padang	21	(0)
2007−2010	Sriwijaya	65	(4)
2010−2011	Persija Jakarta	19	(0)
2011−2013	PSPS Pekanbaru	48	(0)
2013	Gresik United	16	(1)
2014	Persebaya (Bhayangkara)	21	(0)
2014−2016	Persija Jakarta	2	(0)
2016–2017	Barito Putera	40	(1)
2018	Bhayangkara	1	(0)
2018	→ Kalteng Putra (loan)	12	(0)
2019–2021	Sriwijaya	26	(2)
Total		294	(10)

International career
2010−2011	Indonesia	2	(0)

Managerial career
- 2021−2022: Sriwijaya (assistant)
- 2022−2024: PSPS Riau (assistant)
- 2024−: Pekanbaru (head coach)
- * Club domestic league appearances and goals

Ambrizal Ammar (born 1 February 1981) is an Indonesian former footballer who plays as a centre-back and current head coach from Pekanbaru.

== Club career ==
On 9 December 2014, he signed again with Persija Jakarta.

== Honours ==
Sriwijaya

- Liga Indonesia Premier Division: 2007–08
- Copa Indonesia/Piala Indonesia: 2007–08, 2008–09, 2010
