= Redo Rinaldi =

Indonesian footballer

Personal information
- Full name: Redo Rinaldi
- Date of birth: 26 May 1994 (age 32)
- Place of birth: Pekanbaru, Indonesia
- Height: 1.68 m (5 ft 6 in)
- Positions: Attacking midfielder; winger

Youth career
- 2011: Rumbai
- 2012: PSPS Pekanbaru

Senior career*
Years	Team	Apps	(Gls)
2013	PSPS Pekanbaru	11	(0)
2014–2016	PS Bengkulu	24	(5)
2016	PSPS Pekanbaru	6	(1)
2017	Persih Tembilahan	0	(0)
2017	Persijap Jepara	9	(2)
2018–2021	PSPS Riau	46	(11)
2019–2020	→ Kuatagh (loan)	0	(0)
2022–2023	Persipal Palu	0	(0)
2025	Pekanbaru	20	(7)
- * Club domestic league appearances and goals

Redo Rinaldi (born 26 May 1994) is an Indonesian professional footballer who plays as an attacking midfielder.

== Club career ==
=== Persijap Jepara ===
In 2017, Rinaldi signed a contract with Indonesian Liga 2 club in the 2017 season.

=== PSPS Riau ===
He was signed for PSPS Riau to play in the Liga 2 in the 2018 season.
