= Ronny Wabia =

Indonesian footballer

Personal information
- Full name: Ronny Wabia
- Date of birth: 23 June 1970 (age 56)
- Place of birth: Biak, Indonesia
- Height: 1.70 m (5 ft 7 in)
- Position: Striker

Senior career*
Years	Team	Apps	(Gls)
1995–2003	Persipura Jayapura		

International career
1996–1997	Indonesia	15	(4)

Managerial career
- 2025: Manokwari United (head coach)
- * Club domestic league appearances and goals

Ronny Wabia (born 23 June 1970) is an Indonesian former footballer who played as a striker.

== International career ==
In 1996, Ronny made his international debut for Indonesia.

=== International goals ===
Ronny Wabia: International goals
No.	Date	Venue	Opponent	Score	Result	Competition
1	4 December 1996	Zayed Sports City Stadium, Abu Dhabi, United Arab Emirates	Kuwait	2–0	2–2	1996 AFC Asian Cup
2	7 December 1996	Zayed Sports City Stadium, Abu Dhabi, United Arab Emirates	South Korea	4–1	4–2	1996 AFC Asian Cup
3	6 April 1997	Gelora Bung Karno Stadium, Jakarta, Indonesia	Cambodia	4–0	8–0	1998 FIFA World Cup qualification
4	6 April 1997	Gelora Bung Karno Stadium, Jakarta, Indonesia	Cambodia	5–0	8–0	1998 FIFA World Cup qualification

== Managerial career ==
In 2025, he was officially contracted to coach Manokwari United for the 2024–25 Liga 4 West Papua season.

== Honours ==
Indonesia

- SEA Games silver medal: 1997

Individual

- Liga Indonesia Premier Division Best Player: 1995–96
