= Merdeka Stadium (Gorontalo) =

Multi-use stadium in Gorontalo, Indonesia

- Location in Sulawesi
- Location: Gorontalo City, Gorontalo, Indonesia
- Coordinates: 0.551581°N 123.056542°E
- Owner: Government of Gorontalo City
- Operator: Government of Gorontalo City
- Capacity: 10,000
- Surface: Grass field

Tenant
- Rajawali Gorontalo

Merdeka Stadium is a multi-use stadium in Gorontalo, Indonesia. It is currently used mostly for football matches and is used as the home venue for Rajawali Gorontalo of the Liga Indonesia. The stadium has a capacity of 10,000 spectators.
