= 2024–25 Liga 4 Bangka Belitung Islands =

Liga 4 Bangka Belitung Islands
- Season: 2024–25
- Dates: 7–18 March 2025
- Champions: PS Bangka (1st title)
- National phase: PS Bangka
- Matches: 12
- Goals: 38 (3.17 per match)
- Biggest win: Putra Laut 0–4 PS Bangka (17 March 2025)
- Highest scoring: Putra Laut 1–4 PS Bangka (2019) (11 March 2025); Putra Laut 1–4 Goju (12 March 2025); PS Bangka 4–1 Goju (13 March 2025)
- Longest winning run: 5 games — PS Bangka
- Longest unbeaten run: 6 games — PS Bangka
- Longest winless run: 4 games — Putra Laut
- Longest losing run: 4 games — Putra Laut

The 2024–25 Liga 4 Bangka Belitung Islands was the inaugural season of Liga 4 Bangka Belitung Islands after the change in the structure of Indonesian football competition and serves as a qualifying round for the national phase of the 2024–25 Liga 4. The competition is organised by the Bangka Belitung Islands Provincial PSSI Association.

== Teams ==
=== Participating teams ===
A total of 3 teams are competing in this season.

No	Team	Location
1	Putra Laut	Bangka Regency
2	Goju	Pangkalpinang
3	PS Bangka	Pangkalpinang

=== Personnel and kits ===
Note: Flags indicate national team as has been defined under FIFA eligibility rules. Players and coaches may hold more than one non-FIFA nationality.

Team	Head coach	Captain	Kit manufacturer	Main kit sponsor	Other kit sponsor(s)
Goju			(Indonesia)		List: Front: Back: Sleeves: Shorts:
PS Bangka			(Indonesia) Made by club	LazisMu	List: Front: Muhammadiyah University of Bangka Belitung, Rektor UMY; Back: Sleeves: Shorts:
Putra Laut			(Indonesia)		List: Front: Back: Sleeves: Shorts:

== Schedule ==
The schedule of the competition is as follows.

Matchday	Date
Matchday 1	7 March 2025
Matchday 2	8 March 2025
Matchday 3	9 March 2025
Matchday 4	10 March 2025
Matchday 5	11 March 2025
Matchday 6	12 March 2025
Matchday 7	13 March 2025
Matchday 8	14 March 2025
Matchday 9	15 March 2025
Matchday 10	16 March 2025
Matchday 11	17 March 2025
Matchday 12	18 March 2025

== League table ==
All matches will be held at Depati Amir Stadium, Pangkalpinang.

Pos	Team	Pld	W	D	L	GF	GA	GD	Pts	Qualification
1	PS Bangka (C)	8	6	1	1	20	7	+13	19	Qualification for the National phase
2	Goju (H)	8	5	0	3	13	10	+3	15	
3	Putra Laut	8	0	1	7	5	21	−16	1	

Source: Liga 4 Bangka Belitung Islands
Rules for classification: 1) Points; 2) Head-to-head points; 3) Head-to-head goal difference; 4) Head-to-head goals scored; 5) Goal difference; 6) Goals scored; 7) Fair-play points; 8) Draw.
(C) Champions; (H) Hosts

== Results ==
Home \ Away	GOJ	PBG	PLA	GOJ	PBG	PLA
Goju		1–2	2–0		1–0	2–1
PS Bangka	2–1		3–1	4–1		1–1
Putra Laut	1–4	1–4		0–1	0–4	

Source: Liga 4 Bangka Belitung Islands
Legend: Blue = home team win; Yellow = draw; Red = away team win.
For upcoming matches, an "a" indicates there is an article about the rivalry between the two participants.

=== Matches ===
Matchday 1 (7 March)
7 March 2025
15:30 WIB (UTC+7)

PS Bangka	2–1	Goju
	Report

Depati Amir Stadium, Pangkalpinang

Matchday 2 (8 March)
8 March 2025
15:30 WIB (UTC+7)

PS Bangka (2019)	3–1	Putra Laut
	Report

Depati Amir Stadium, Pangkalpinang

Matchday 3 (9 March)
9 March 2025
15:30 WIB (UTC+7)

Goju	2–0	Putra Laut
	Report

Depati Amir Stadium, Pangkalpinang

Matchday 4 (10 March)
10 March 2025
16:00 WIB (UTC+7)

Goju	1–2	PS Bangka (2019)
	Report

Depati Amir Stadium, Pangkalpinang

Matchday 5 (11 March)
11 March 2025
16:00 WIB (UTC+7)

Putra Laut	1–4	PS Bangka (2019)
	Report

Depati Amir Stadium, Pangkalpinang

Matchday 6 (12 March)
12 March 2025
16:00 WIB (UTC+7)

Putra Laut	1–4	Goju
	Report

Depati Amir Stadium, Pangkalpinang

Matchday 7 (13 March)
13 March 2025
16:00 WIB (UTC+7)

PS Bangka	4–1	Goju
	Report

Depati Amir Stadium, Pangkalpinang

Matchday 8 (14 March)
14 March 2025
15:30 WIB (UTC+7)

PS Bangka (2019)	1–1	Putra Laut
	Report

Depati Amir Stadium, Pangkalpinang

Matchday 9 (15 March)
15 March 2025
15:30 WIB (UTC+7)

Goju	2–1	Putra Laut
	Report

Depati Amir Stadium, Pangkalpinang

Matchday 10 (16 March)
16 March 2025
16:00 WIB (UTC+7)

Goju	1–0	PS Bangka (2019)
	Report

Depati Amir Stadium, Pangkalpinang

Matchday 11 (17 March)
17 March 2025
15:30 WIB (UTC+7)

Putra Laut	0–4	PS Bangka (2019)
	Report

Depati Amir Stadium, Pangkalpinang

Matchday 12 (18 March)
18 March 2025
15:30 WIB (UTC+7)

Putra Laut	0–1	Goju
	Report

Depati Amir Stadium, Pangkalpinang

== See also ==
- 2024–25 Liga 4
