= Kreasindo Rajawali Sultan F.C. =

Indonesian football club

Kreasindo Rajawali Sultan
- Full name: Kreasindo Rajawali Sultan Football Club
- Nickname: The Gorontalo Eagle
- Founded: 15 August 1969; 56 years ago, as PS Rajawali Gorontalo; 2025; 1 year ago, as Kreasindo Rajawali Sultan (merged with Kreasindo)
- Ground: Merdeka Stadium; Gorontalo
- Capacity: 10,000
- Owner: Mohamad Rezky Zees
- Coach: Syaiful Yahya
- League: Liga 4
- 2024–25: 1st (Gorontalo zone); First round, 3rd in Group M (National phase)
Home colours	Away colours

Kreasindo Rajawali Sultan Football Club (formerly known as Rajawali Sultan Gorontalo) is an Indonesian football club based in Gorontalo City, Gorontalo. They currently compete in the Liga 4.

== Honours ==
- Liga 3 Gorontalo
  - Runner-up (1): 2019
- Liga 4 Gorontalo
  - Champion (1): 2024–25
