= Jodi Kustiawan =

Indonesian footballer

Personal information
- Full name: Jodi Kustiawan
- Date of birth: 15 May 1992 (age 34)
- Place of birth: Ngawi, Indonesia
- Height: 1.76 m (5 ft 9 in)
- Position: Centre-back

Team information
- Current team: Pekanbaru
- Number: 15

Youth career
- 2011−2012: PON Kalimantan Selatan

Senior career*
Years	Team	Apps	(Gls)
2010	Persika Karawang	5	(0)
2011	Martapura	6	(0)
2013	Persema Malang	9	(0)
2014	Martapura	14	(0)
2015	Perserang Serang	0	(0)
2016	Perssu Real Madura	16	(0)
2017	PSS Sleman	12	(1)
2018	Persela Lamongan	4	(0)
2018	PSS Sleman	6	(0)
2019	Persis Solo	14	(0)
2020	Persijap Jepara	1	(0)
2021−2022	PSIM Yogyakarta	13	(0)
2023–2024	PSKC Cimahi	13	(0)
2024–2025	Adhyaksa	10	(0)
2025–	Pekanbaru	9	(0)
- * Club domestic league appearances and goals as of 7 January 2026

Jodi Kustiawan (born 15 May 1992) is an Indonesian professional footballer who plays as a centre-back for Liga Nusantara club Pekanbaru.

== Club career ==
=== PSIM Yogyakarta ===
In 2021, Jodi signed a contract with Indonesian Liga 2 club PSIM Yogyakarta. He made his league debut on 26 September in a 1–0 loss against PSCS Cilacap.

== Honours ==
=== Club ===
PSS Sleman

- Liga 2: 2018
