= Sang Maestro F.C. =

Indonesian football club

Sang Maestro
- Full name: Sang Maestro Football Club
- Nicknames: The Maestro; Boyo Keren
- Founded: 2016; 10 years ago
- Dissolved: 2025; 1 year ago
- Ground: Jala Krida AAL Stadium
- Capacity: 1,000
- Owner: Junianto
- 2024–25: Liga 4, Fourth round, 3rd in Group NN (East Java zone); Fourth round, 4th in Group B (National phase) (promoted)
Home colours	Away colours

Sang Maestro Football Club was an Indonesian football club based in Surabaya, East Java.

== History ==
The club was founded in 2016 as Football Club Maestro.

On 15 May 2025, Sang Maestro secured promotion to Liga Nusantara for the first time in their history after a narrow 1–0 win against Tri Brata Rafflesia at UNS Stadium, Surakarta, during the third round of the Liga 4 national phase in Group C, and advanced to the fourth round.

Sang Maestro was acquired by club from Central Papua, Persinab Nabire, and relocated from Surabaya to Nabire.

== Controversy ==
In the match against Persewangi Banyuwangi on 11 February 2025 in the continuation of 2024–25 Liga 4 East Java zone at Diponegoro Stadium in Banyuwangi, Persewangi Banyuwangi coach, Yulius Alexander Saununu suspects that referee Farid Riesdianto cheated and committed fraud which harmed his club. This allegation of bias emerged after the leadership of the referee from Sidoarjo Regency was considered biased and greatly benefited Sang Maestro.

== Season-by-season records ==
Season(s)	League/Division	Teams	Pos.	Piala Indonesia
2018	Liga 3	32	Eliminated in provincial phase	–
2019				
2020	Liga 3	season abandoned		–
2021–22	Liga 3	64	Eliminated in provincial phase	–
2022–23	Liga 3	season abandoned		–
2023–24				
2024–25	Liga 4	64	4th, fourth round	–
