= Persipegaf =

Indonesian football club

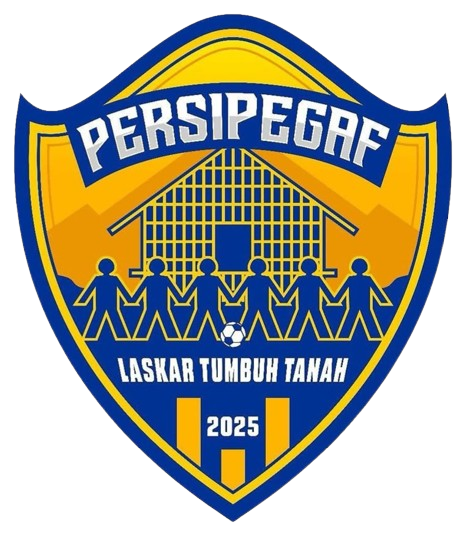
- Full name: Persatuan Sepakbola Indonesia Pegunungan Arfak
- Nickname: Laskar Tumbuh Tanah
- Founded: 2025; 1 year ago
- Ground: Irai Field
- Owner: PSSI Arfak Mountains
- Manager: Jarinus Mandacan
- Coach: Masdra Nurriza
- League: Liga 4
- 2025–26: 1st, Champion (West Papua zone); First round, 4th in Group G (National phase)

Persatuan Sepakbola Indonesia Pegunungan Arfak, commonly known as Persipegaf, is an Indonesian football club based in Arfak Mountains Regency, West Papua. The club currently competes in Liga 4, the fourth tier of Indonesian football league system.

== History ==
Persipegaf was established in 2025 as a newly formed football club representing Arfak Mountains Regency. The club made its official debut in the 2024–25 Liga 4 West Papua competition.

In its inaugural season, Persipegaf received financial support of approximately Rp 1 billion from the Arfak Mountains Regency Government to support its participation and development.

Despite being a newly founded club, Persipegaf achieved significant success by winning the Liga 4 West Papua zone, securing qualification to the national phase. The team advanced to the Round of 32 in the Liga 4 national phase, finishing fourth in Group Q.

During the national competition, Persipegaf recorded notable performances, including a narrow victory in one of its matches, which strengthened confidence from local officials about the club's potential to reach the final stages. However, their campaign ended in the Round of 32 after failing to progress further, including a defeat against Celebest which dashed their hopes of promotion to Liga Nusantara.

Additionally, Persipegaf was among the representatives from West Papua that successfully advanced to the national round of Liga 4, highlighting the club's rapid rise shortly after its establishment.

== Stadium ==
Persipegaf plays its home matches at Irai Field, located in Anggi, Arfak Mountains Regency.

== Honours ==
- Liga 4 West Papua
  - Champions (2): 2024–25, 2025–26
