= PS Bangka (2019) =

Indonesian football club

- Full name: Persatuan Sepakbola Bangka
- Nicknames: Timah Panas; Laskar Sekaban
- Founded: 2019; 7 years ago
- Ground: Depati Amir Stadium, Pangkal Pinang, Bangka Belitung
- Capacity: 15,000
- League: Liga 4
- 2024–25: 1st (Bangka Belitung Islands zone); First round, 4th in Group C (National phase)
Home colours	Away colours

Persatuan Sepakbola Bangka, commonly known as PS Bangka is an Indonesian football club based in Pangkal Pinang, Bangka Belitung Islands. They currently compete in Liga 4 Bangka Belitung Islands zone.

== History ==
PS Bangka changed its name to PS Timah Babel in 2017.

In 2019, the club merged with Aceh United to form Babel United.

After that, the local government formed a new club called PS Bangka to participate in the Liga 3 2019 Bangka Belitung.

== Honours ==
- Liga 4 Bangka Belitung Islands
  - Champion (1): 2024–25

== Stadium ==
The club play their home games at Depati Amir Stadium, Pangkal Pinang.

== Supporters ==
PS Timah Bangka Belitung majority reinforced by local players, have fans club, named Laskar Sekaban (en: Warriors) Supporter Bangka Belitung.
