= Eduard Ivakdalam =

Indonesian footballer

Personal information
- Full name: Eduard Ivakdalam
- Date of birth: 19 December 1974 (age 51)
- Place of birth: Merauke, Indonesia
- Height: 1.71 m (5 ft 7 in)
- Position: Midfielder

Team information
- Current team: Manokwari United (head coach)

Youth career
- PS Merauke
- PS Maren Jayapura

Senior career*
| Years | Team | Apps | (Gls) |
| 1994–2010 | Persipura Jayapura | 218 | (21) |
| 2010–2013 | Persidafon Dafonsoro | 81 | (13) |
| 2013–2014 | Persiwa Wamena | 19 | (1) |
| Total | | 318 | (35) |

International career
| 1996–2004 | Indonesia | 11 | (3) |

Managerial career
- 2022–2025: Persewar Waropen
- 2025–: Manokwari United
- * Club domestic league appearances and goals

Eduard Ivakdalam (born 19 December 1974 in Merauke, Irian Jaya) is an Indonesian former professional footballer. Ivakdalam normally plays as a midfielder and he is a former player for Indonesia national football team.

== National team career ==
Ivakdalam played for Indonesia in three tournaments; the 1996 Asian Cup, 1997 SEA Games, and the 2000 Asian Cup.

Eduard Ivakdalam: International goals
| No. | Date | Venue | Opponent | Score | Result | Competition |
|---|---|---|---|---|---|---|
| 1 | 13 October 2003 | Prince Abdullah Al-Faisal Stadium, Jeddah, Saudi Arabia | Bhutan | 1–0 | 2–0 | 2004 AFC Asian Cup qualification |
| 2 | 15 October 2003 | Prince Abdullah Al-Faisal Stadium, Jeddah, Saudi Arabia | Yemen | 1–0 | 2–2 | 2004 AFC Asian Cup qualification |
| 3 | 19 October 2003 | Prince Abdullah Al-Faisal Stadium, Jeddah, Saudi Arabia | Yemen | 2–1 | 2–2 | 2004 AFC Asian Cup qualification |

== Honours ==
Persipura Jayapura

- Liga Indonesia Premier Division: 2005
- Indonesia Super League: 2008–09
- Indonesian Community Shield: 2009
- Copa Indonesia runner-up: 2006, 2007–08, 2008–09

Indonesia

- AFF Championship runner-up: 2000
- SEA Games silver medal: 1997

Individual

- Indonesia Super League Fair Play Award: 2009–10
