= Kompyang Sujana Stadium =

Stadium in Indonesia

- Stadion Kompyang Sujana ᬲ᭄ᬢᬤᬶᬬᭀᬦ᭄ᬓᭀᬫ᭄ᬧ᭄ᬬᬂᬲᬸᬚᬦ
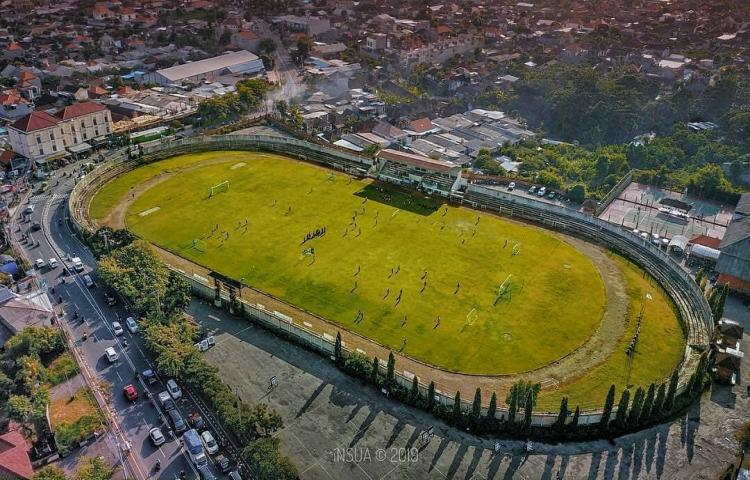

- Location in Denpasar, Bali and Indonesia Kompyang Sujana Stadium (Bali) Kompyang Sujana Stadium (Indonesia)
- Address: Margi Tegal Kertha, West Denpasar, Denpasar, Bali 80118; Indonesia
- Location: Denpasar, Bali
- Coordinates: 8.6526°S 115.1944°E
- Operator: Government of Denpasar City
- Capacity: 7,000
- Surface: Grass field

Construction
- Renovated: 2021

Tenant
- Perseden Denpasar

Kompyang Sujana Stadium (Balinese script: ᬲ᭄ᬢᬤᬶᬬᭀᬦ᭄ᬓᭀᬫ᭄ᬧ᭄ᬬᬂᬲᬸᬚᬦ) is a multi-purpose stadium in Denpasar, Bali, Indonesia, and the home of Liga Nusantara club Perseden Denpasar. It has a capacity of 7,000 spectators.

In 2021, the field renovation has been carried out. Stadium lighting was changed to international standards, drainage channels were also renovated, and lights were changed to 800 lux in preparation for the 2023 FIFA U-20 World Cup in Indonesia.
