= Persemai Dumai =

Indonesian football club

- Full name: Persatuan Sepakbola Dumai
- Nickname: Harimau Pesisir (The Coastal Tigers)
- Founded: 1967; 59 years ago
- Ground: Bukit Jin Football Field; Dumai, Riau
- Capacity: 10,000
- Owner: Askot PSSI Dumai
- Chairman: Medya Al Edy
- Coach: Asral Yani
- League: Liga 4
- 2024–25: 2nd, (Riau zone)
Home colours	Away colours

Persatuan Sepakbola Dumai (simply known as Persemai) is an Indonesian football club based in Dumai, Riau. They currently compete in the Liga 4 Riau zone.

== Honours ==
- Liga 4 Riau
  - Runners-up: 2024–25
