= Manokwari United F.C. =

Indonesian football club

Manokwari United
- Full name: Manokwari United Football Club
- Nickname: Mambruk Ubiaat (Blue crowned pigeon)
- Short name: MU
- Founded: 2025; 1 year ago
- Ground: Sanggeng Stadium; Manokwari
- Capacity: 10,000
- Manager: Piton Wabia
- Coach: Eduard Ivakdalam
- League: Liga 4
- 2024–25: 2nd (West Papua zone); First round, 3rd in Group N (National phase)
Home colours	Away colours

Manokwari United Football Club is an Indonesian football club based in Manokwari, West Papua. They currently compete in the Liga 4 West Papua zone. Their homebase is Sanggeng Stadium.

== Honours ==
- Liga 4 West Papua
  - Runner-up (1): 2024–25
