= Pekanbaru F.C. =

Indonesian football club

Pekanbaru
- Full name: Pekanbaru Football Club
- Nicknames: Laskar Hang Tuah; Cempaka Kuning
- Short name: PFC
- Founded: August 2024; 2 years ago
- Ground: Garuda Sakti (Buluh Cina) Field; Pekanbaru
- Owner: PSSI Pekanbaru City
- Manager: Firman Fitra Abdi
- Coach: Supardi Nasir
- League: Liga Nusantara
- 2025–26: Liga Nusantara, Quarter-finals
| Home colours | Away colours |

Pekanbaru Football Club is an Indonesian football club based in Pekanbaru, Riau. They currently compete in the Liga Nusantara, the third tier of Indonesian football after promotion from Liga 4 in 2024–25. Their homebase is Garuda Sakti (Buluh Cina) Field.

== History ==
Pekanbaru Football Club was founded in August 2024 with the nickname Cempaka Kuning (The Yellow Champaca) and homebase in Garuda Sakti Field.

Pekanbaru FC will start competing inaugural season in Liga 4 starting from 2024–25. Despite finishing in third place, Pekanbaru advanced to the national phase with Wahana, who were the champions of the Liga 4 Riau after Persemai withdrew for financial reasons.

On 15 May 2025, Pekanbaru secured promotion to Liga Nusantara for the first time in their history from next season after draw against Persikoba Kota Batu 0–0 in UMS Stadium, Surakarta on National phase Third round Liga 4 and advanced to Fourth round.

== Players ==
=== Current squad ===
As of 27 September 2026

Note: Flags indicate national team as defined under FIFA eligibility rules; some limited exceptions apply. Players may hold more than one non-FIFA nationality.

| No. | Pos. | Nation | Player |
|---|---|---|---|
| 1 | GK | IDN | Dika Saputra |
| 4 | DF | IDN | Surya Admaja |
| 5 | MF | IDN | Indra Saragih |
| 6 | MF | IDN | Suhendra Saputra (captain) |
| 7 | FW | IDN | Reyhan Valeby |
| 8 | MF | IDN | Aidun Sastra Utami |
| 10 | FW | IDN | Ali Ichsan |
| 11 | FW | IDN | Alliev Witoyo |
| 12 | DF | IDN | Habib Hidayatullah |
| 13 | FW | IDN | Syahid Jundullah |
| 14 | MF | IDN | Enrico Delfiendra |
| 15 | DF | IDN | Jodi Kustiawan |

| No. | Pos. | Nation | Player |
|---|---|---|---|
| 17 | MF | IDN | Resa Aditya |
| 19 | FW | IDN | Vengko Armedya |
| 21 | DF | IDN | Dimas Nugraha |
| 23 | GK | IDN | Alif Danial |
| 28 | DF | IDN | Syendio Fernanda |
| 68 | DF | IDN | Prayoga Sanjaya |
| 76 | GK | IDN | Muhammad Randhu |
| 78 | DF | IDN | Muhammad Adam |
| 81 | GK | IDN | Yogi Hermawan |
| 86 | FW | IDN | Elvateeh Varesia |
| 87 | MF | IDN | Haidar Abdan |
| 88 | MF | IDN | Marcello |
| 90 | FW | IDN | Fajira Aqhiyar |
| 91 | FW | IDN | Januardi Rahmad |

== Performance by season ==
=== Records ===
| Season | League | | | | | | | | | | Indonesian Cup |
| Season | Comp. | | App. | W | D | L | GF | GA | Pts. | Pos. | Indonesian Cup |
|---|---|---|---|---|---|---|---|---|---|---|---|
| 2024–25 | Liga 4 | Provincial phase | 12 | 7 | 3 | 2 | 30 | 11 | 24 | 3rd | Not held |
| 2024–25 | Liga 4 | First round | 2 | 0 | 1 | 1 | 1 | 2 | 1 | 2nd, Group N | Not held |
| 2024–25 | Liga 4 | Second round | 3 | 2 | 0 | 1 | 6 | 2 | 6 | 2nd, Group W | Not held |
| 2024–25 | Liga 4 | Third round | 3 | 2 | 1 | 0 | 5 | 0 | 7 | 1st, Group D (Note: Each winners and runners-up from 4 groups, namely 8 clubs from 16 clubs playing in the third round will get a promotion quota to the Liga Nusantara and advance to the fourth phase.) | Not held |
| 2024–25 | Liga 4 | Fourth round | 3 | 1 | 0 | 2 | 6 | 6 | 3 | 2nd, Group B | Not held |
| 2024–25 | Liga 4 | Final | Not advanced | | | | | | | | Not held |
| 2025–26 | Liga Nusantara | | 16 | 5 | 7 | 4 | 20 | 20 | 22 | Quarter-finalist | – |
| 2026–27 | Liga Nusantara | | | | | | | | | TBD | – |

| Champion | Runner-up | Promotion | Relegation |

=== Season by season ===
| Season | Tier | Division | Place | Piala Indonesia |
|---|---|---|---|---|
| 2024–25 | 4 | L4 | 2nd in NP R4 B | – |
| 2025–26 | 3 | LN | Quarter-finalist | – |

- 1 season in Liga Nusantara
- 1 season in Liga 4
