= Putra Sang Fajar F.C. =

Indonesian football club in Blitar

Putra Sang Fajar
- Full name: Putra Sang Fajar Football Club
- Short name: PSF
- Founded: 2012; 14 years ago, as Polda Bengkulu FC; 1 November 2021; 4 years ago as Tri Brata Rafflesia FC; 2026; 0 years ago, as Putra Sang Fajar FC
- Ground: Gelora Supriyadi Stadium
- Capacity: 15,000
- Owner: Indonesian Democratic Party of Struggle East Java Regional Leadership
- Coach: M. Nasir
- League: Liga Nusantara
- 2025–26: Liga Nusantara/Regular Round (Group B), 4th

Putra Sang Fajar Football Club (formerly known as Polda Bengkulu FC and Tri Brata Rafflesia FC) is an Indonesian football club based in Blitar, East Java. They compete in Liga Nusantara from 2025–26 season.

== History ==
Tri Brata Rafflesia was established in 2012 under the name Polda Bengkulu Football Club.

On 1 November 2021, the club officially changed its name to Tri Brata Rafflesia Football Club and became a recognized member of the Bengkulu Provincial PSSI Association. That same year, they made its competitive debut in the 2021–22 Liga 3 Bengkulu.

In 2024–25 Liga 4 national phase, Tri Brata Rafflesia competed in Liga 4 and successfully secured promotion to Liga Nusantara for the first time in their history from 2025–26 season after defeat Celebest 1–2 in Kota Barat Stadium, Surakarta on national phase third round Group C on 13 May 2025. They managed to become Liga 4 champions after winning 3–2 in the final over Persika Karanganyar on 27 May 2025 at Manahan Stadium, Surakarta.

In 2026, Tri Brata Rafflesia changed their name to Putra Sang Fajar. They also moved their home base from Bengkulu to Blitar. This was done after the club's ownership was transferred to the East Java Regional Leadership of the Indonesian Democratic Party of Struggle.

== Name and logo changes ==
=== Logo history ===
Tri Brata Rafflesia (2021–2025)

=== Naming history ===
- Polda Bengkulu (2012–2021)
- Tri Brata Rafflesia (2021–2026)
- Putra Sang Fajar (2026–present)

== Players ==
=== Current squad ===
As of 29 November 2025

Note: Flags indicate national team as defined under FIFA eligibility rules; some limited exceptions apply. Players may hold more than one non-FIFA nationality.

| No. | Pos. | Nation | Player |
|---|---|---|---|
| 1 | GK | IDN | Rendi Andika |
| 2 | DF | IDN | Fajar Khoirul Anam |
| 3 | DF | IDN | Angger Ristiawan |
| 4 | DF | IDN | Izzan Al Nasir |
| 5 | DF | IDN | Dimas Saputra |
| 6 | MF | IDN | Richo Hans |
| 8 | MF | IDN | Bayu Noperanda (captain) |
| 9 | FW | IDN | Rizky Agung |
| 10 | FW | IDN | Ariesta Renaldo |
| 11 | FW | IDN | Iqbal Tri Saputra |
| 12 | MF | IDN | Dedy Jaenuar |
| 14 | MF | IDN | Afri Age Chandra |
| 17 | FW | IDN | Yahya Kardinando |
| 18 | MF | IDN | Ridwan Firdian |
| 19 | GK | IDN | Asyurah Al Faqih |

| No. | Pos. | Nation | Player |
|---|---|---|---|
| 21 | GK | IDN | Alwan Ariyanto |
| 22 | DF | IDN | Alvi |
| 23 | FW | IDN | Qoyum Nazaludin |
| 24 | MF | IDN | Farel Fahlevi |
| 25 | MF | IDN | Fajarubi Nur Fauzi'a |
| 26 | GK | IDN | Saelan Chandra Putra |
| 27 | DF | IDN | Gilang Ananda |
| 28 | DF | IDN | Rakha Mahardika |
| 29 | DF | IDN | Fathur Rahman |
| 32 | DF | IDN | Doni Setiawan |
| 33 | MF | IDN | Sabriwanasir |
| 34 | DF | IDN | Habib Al-Awal |
| 35 | MF | IDN | Falencio Davinsi |
| 36 | DF | IDN | Zaim Almubarok |

== Season-by-season records ==
=== As Tri Brata Rafflesia ===
| Season | League | Tier | Tms. | Pos. | Piala Indonesia |
|---|---|---|---|---|---|
| 2021–22 | Liga 3 | 3 | 64 | eliminated in provincial phase | — |
| 2022–23 | Liga 3 | 3 | season abandoned | | — |
| 2023–24 | Liga 3 | 3 | 80 | second round | — |
| 2024–25 | Liga 4 | 4 | 64 | 1st | — |
| 2025–26 | Liga Nusantara | 3 | 24 | 4th, Group B | — |

=== As Putra Sang Fajar ===
| Season | League | Tier | Tms. | Pos. | Piala Indonesia |
|---|---|---|---|---|---|
| 2026–27 | Liga Nusantara | 3 | 24 | TBD | — |

== Honours ==
- Liga 4
  - Champions (1): 2024–25
- Liga 3 Bengkulu
  - Champions (1): 2023–24
  - Runner-up (1): 2021
- Liga 4 Bengkulu
  - Champions (1): 2024–25
