= Liga 4 (Indonesia) =

Fourth tier of Indonesian football

- Organising body: PSSI
- Founded: 2024; 2 years ago
- Country: Indonesia
- Confederation: AFC
- Number of clubs: unlimited (regency/city phase & provincial phase); 64 (national phase)
- Level on pyramid: 4
- Promotion to: Liga Nusantara
- Domestic cup: Piala Indonesia
- Current champions: Pasuruan United; 1st Liga 4 title 1st fourth-tier title (2025–26)
- Broadcasters: Streaming: YouTube (PSSI TV) (national phase)
- Current: 2026–27 Liga 4

Liga 4 is the fourth-tier of the football competition system in Indonesia. The competition is organized by the Football Association of Indonesia (PSSI) and the first season started in 2024.

== History ==
From 2015 to 2023, there was no fourth-tier competition in the Indonesian football league system following the merger of Liga Nusantara with the First Division, which resulted in the formation of the Liga 3 as the lowest tier of the national league structure.

In 2024, PSSI restructured the league system and reintroduced the fourth-tier competition under the name Liga 4, following the elevation of the Liga 3 to a semi-professional status operated by the I-League.

== Format ==
=== 2024–25 season ===
==== Provincial phase ====
Each province held a provincial league, they were followed by amateur clubs without a limit of participants with different competition formats, the difference in the format was due to the different number of participants in each province. Furthermore, the teams that qualified from the provincial phase competed in national phase.

==== National phase ====
A total of 64 teams entered this phase.

- First round: 64 teams were divided into sixteen groups of four. Each group was played on a home tournament basis. Winner and runner-up of each group advanced to the second round.
- Second round: 32 teams which were the winners and runners-up from each group of the first round. They were divided into 8 groups of four and each winner and runner-up advanced to the third round.
- Third round: 16 teams were divided into 4 groups four. Each group was played on a home tournament basis. The winner and runner-up of each group advanced to the fourth round and promoted to 2025–26 Liga Nusantara
- Fourth round: 8 teams were divided into 2 groups of four. The winner of each group advanced to the final.
- Final: The 2 group winners from the fourth round played in the final match. The final was played as a single match.

=== 2025–26 season ===
==== Regency/city phase ====
Each regency or city holds a league, organized by the respective regency or city PSSI association. The league is contested by amateur clubs without a limit of participants, with different competition formats depending on the number of clubs in each regency or city. The qualified teams from this phase will advance to the provincial phase.

==== Provincial phase ====
Each province holds a provincial league, organized by the respective provincial PSSI association. The participants consist of the provincial PSSI association as well as qualified teams from the regency and city phase. The qualified teams from the provincial phase advance to the national phase.

==== National phase ====
The national phase is contested by the best teams from all provincial leagues. In this phase, the qualified teams compete for promotion to 2026–27 Liga Nusantara.

== Championship history ==
| Season | League name | Champions | Score | Runners-up |
|---|---|---|---|---|
| 2024–25 | Liga 4 | Tri Brata Rafflesia | 3–2 | Persika Karanganyar |
| 2025–26 | Liga 4 | Pasuruan United | 1–0 | Pesik Kuningan |
| 2026–27 | Liga 4 | | | |

== Promotion history ==
| Season | Promoted teams | Total |
|---|---|---|
| 2024–25 | Batavia; Pekanbaru; Persebata Lembata; Perseden Denpasar; Persika Karanganyar; Persitara North Jakarta; Sang Maestro; Tri Brata Rafflesia | 8 |
| 2025–26 | Pasuruan United; Persibangga; Persinga; Persipani; Pesik; PSN | 6 |
| 2026–27 | | |

== Awards ==
=== Best players ===
| Season | Player | Club |
|---|---|---|
| 2024–25 | (Indonesia) Iqbal Tri Saputra | Tri Brata Rafflesia |
| 2025–26 | (Indonesia) Racksa Surya Wijaya | Pasuruan United |

=== Top scorers ===
| Season | Top scorer | Club | Goals |
|---|---|---|---|
| 2024–25 | (Indonesia) Rizqi Fauzan | Persika Karanganyar | 14 |
| 2025–26 | (Indonesia) Mohammad Rifqi | Celebest | 10 |

=== Best young players ===
| Season | Player | Club |
|---|---|---|
| 2024–25 | (Indonesia) Dedy Jaenuar | Tri Brata Rafflesia |
| 2025–26 | (Indonesia) Mohamad Revanza | Pesik Kuningan |

=== Fair play awards ===
| Season | Club |
|---|---|
| 2024–25 | Pekanbaru |
| 2025–26 | 757 Kepri Jaya |

== See also ==
- Indonesian football league system
- Super League
- Championship
- Liga Nusantara
- Piala Presiden
- Piala Indonesia
