= 2025–26 Liga 4 national phase =

Second season of the Liga 4 in Indonesia

The 2025–26 Liga 4 national phase is scheduled to begin on 30 May and conclude on 11 July 2026. The top 64 teams from 38 provincial leagues in the provincial phase will compete for 6 promotion spots to the 2026–27 Liga Nusantara. Each provincial league will have at least one representative, with the number of representatives adjusted based on the league's coefficient. This phase will serve as the title for the first version of the 2026 Piala Presiden.

== Format ==
A total of 64 teams will participate in the national phase.

- First round: The 64 teams are divided into 16 groups of four, with each group competing in a home tournament format. The winners and runners-up of each group advance to the second round.
- Second round: The 32 qualified teams (winners and runners-up from the first round) are divided into 8 groups of four. Each group follows the same home tournament format, with the winners and runners-up advancing to the third round.
- Third round: The remaining 16 teams are divided into 4 groups of four, competing in a home tournament format. The winners and runners-up of each group advance to the fourth round.
- Fourth round: The 8 remaining teams are divided into 2 groups of four. The top three teams of each group earn promotion to the 2026–27 Liga Nusantara with the winners and runners-up of each group advance to the knockout round.
- Final: The two group winners from the fourth round face off in a single-match final to determine the league champion.

== Teams ==
=== Qualified teams ===
The following teams will represent their respective provincial leagues in the national phase.

Sumatra Region
(Aceh) PSAP Sigli (1st)	(Aceh) Al-Farlaky (2nd)	(North Sumatra) PS Paya Bakung United (1st)	(North Sumatra) Binjai City (3rd) (Note: PS Kwarta, who were runners-up of the 2025–26 Liga 4 North Sumatra, withdrew from the national phase due to financial issues. As a result, Binjai City, who finished third, took over their spot in the national phase.)
(Riau) Wahana (1st)	(Riau Islands) 757 Kepri Jaya (1st)	(West Sumatra) PSP Padang (1st)	(West Sumatra) PSPP Padang Panjang (2nd) (Note: PS Kubu Raya, who were runners-up of the 2025–26 Liga 4 West Kalimantan, withdrew from the national phase due to financial issues. As a result, PSPP Padang Panjang, who finished as runners-up of the 2025–26 Liga 4 West Sumatra, took over their spot in the national phase.)
(Jambi) Persebri Batanghari (1st)	Tunas Muda Bengkulu (1st)	(South Sumatra) Porsiba Bukit Asam (2nd) (Note: Siti Fatimah, who were champions of the 2025–26 Liga 4 South Sumatra, withdrew from the national phase due to financial issues. As a result, Porsiba Bukit Asam, who finished as runners-up, took over their spot in the national phase.)	(Lampung) TS Saiburai (2nd) (Note: Tanggamus Farmers Angonsaka, who were champions of the 2025–26 Liga 4 Lampung, withdrew from the national phase due to internal disputes between club management and their players. As a result, TS Saiburai, who finished as runners-up, took over their spot in the national phase.)
Kalimantan Region
(West Kalimantan) Persiwah Mempawah (1st)	(Central Kalimantan) Sylva Kalteng (1st)	(South Kalimantan) Persemar Martapura (1st)	(East Kalimantan) Balikpapan (1st)
Java Region
(Banten) Nathan Lebak (1st)	(Banten) Harin (2nd)	(Jakarta) ASIOP (1st)	PSJS South Jakarta (2nd)
(Jakarta) Villa 2000 B (3rd)	(West Java) Persikotas Tasikmalaya (1st)	(West Java) Persika 1951 (2nd)	(West Java) Pesik Kuningan (3rd)
(West Java) Cimahi United (4th)	(West Java) Persindra Indramayu (R3)	(West Java) Persigar Garut (R3)	(Central Java) Persibangga Purbalingga (1st)
(Central Java) Persak Kebumen (2nd)	(Central Java) Persiharjo Sukoharjo (SF)	(Central Java) Persebi Boyolali (QF) (Note: PSIR Rembang, who were semifinalists of the 2025–26 Liga 4 Central Java, were disqualified following rioting done by their players, club officials, and supporters in their semi-final defeat against Persak Kebumen. The replacement for their spot in the national phase will be Persebi Boyolali, who lost to PSIR in the quarter-finals.)	(Special Region of Yogyakarta) Mataram Utama Manggala (1st)
(East Java) Persepam Pamekasan (1st)	(East Java) Pasuruan United (2nd)	(East Java) Persid Jember (3rd)	(East Java) Persinga Ngawi (4th)
(East Java) Persenga Nganjuk (R4)	(East Java) Persikoba Batu (R4)	(East Java) PS Mojokerto Putra (R4)	(East Java) Triple'S Kediri (R4)
Lesser Sunda Islands Region
(Bali) PS Badung (1st)	(West Nusa Tenggara) PS Daygun (1st)	(West Nusa Tenggara) Persebi Bima (2nd)	(West Nusa Tenggara) Perslotim East Lombok (3rd)
(East Nusa Tenggara) PSN Ngada (1st)	(East Nusa Tenggara) Persena Nagekeo (2nd)	(East Nusa Tenggara) Persada Southwest Sumba (4th) (Note: Bajak Laut, who finished third-place in the 2025–26 Liga 4 East Nusa Tenggara, were ineligible for the national phase as they were not full members of PSSI East Nusa Tenggara at the time of the competition. Their spot in the national phase were taken over by fourth-placed Persada Southwest Sumba instead.)	
Sulawesi Region
(North Sulawesi) Persma 1960 (1st)	(North Sulawesi) Bolsel (2nd)	(Gorontalo) Panua GFC (1st)	(Central Sulawesi) Celebest (1st)
(West Sulawesi) Persimaju Mamuju (1st)	(South Sulawesi) Makassar City (1st)	(South Sulawesi) MRC Bulukumba (2nd)	(Southeast Sulawesi) Unaaha (1st)
Papua Region
(Southwest Papua) Persikos Sorong (1st)	(Southwest Papua) Persemay Maybrat (2nd)	(West Papua (province)) Persipegaf Arfak Mountains (1st)	(Central Papua) Persipani Paniai (1st)
(Central Papua) Persipuncak Puncak (2nd)	(Papua (province)) Persiker Keerom (1st)	(Highland Papua) Wamena United (1st)	(Highland Papua) Persigubin Bintang Mountains (2nd)
(South Papua) Golden (1st)

=== Locations ===
Locations of non-Java-based 2025–26 Liga 4 national phase teams.
Yellow: Provincial league champions; Red: Other qualified teams (based on provincial quota).
Locations of Java-based 2025–26 Liga 4 national phase teams.
Yellow: Provincial league champions; Red: Other qualified teams (based on provincial quota).

=== Personnel and kits ===
Note: Flags indicate national team as has been defined under FIFA eligibility rules. Players and Managers may hold more than one non-FIFA nationality.

Team	Head coach	Captain	Kit manufacturer	Main kit sponsor	Other kit sponsor(s)
757 Kepri Jaya	(Indonesia)	(Indonesia)	(Indonesia) Made by club	Indofood	List: Front: Club Air Mineral, Batamindo; Back: Bintan Resorts; Sleeves: None; Shorts: None
Al-Farlaky	(Indonesia) Rizki Zulfitri	(Indonesia) Herdiansyah	(Indonesia) Trops	Iskandar Al-Farlaky	List: Front: Usram, Aceh Timur Garang, Jersey Aceh; Back: Laskar Bumi Nurul A'la, Trops; Sleeves: Shorts:
ASIOP	(Indonesia) Gilang Ramadhan	(Indonesia) Jamaluddin Rais	(Indonesia) Mills	Bank Mandiri	List: Front: Transtama Logistics, Sompo Insurance Indonesia, PAM Jaya; Back: Medira, Ethiopian Airlines; Sleeves: PT Inti Sukses Garmindo, Panca Prima Maju Bersama; Shorts: None
Binjai City	(Indonesia) Amran	(Indonesia) Yusrizal Muzakki	(Indonesia) Sano Apparel	Putra Laskar Group	List: Front: None; Back: PT Julindo Karya Gemilang, CV Naula Pelita Mandiri, Kowaii Ponsel, Tudungpeople Indonesia; Sleeves: None; Shorts: None
Balikpapan	(Indonesia) Muhammad Al-Jawadi	(Indonesia)	(Indonesia) Equalnesia	None	List: Front: None; Back: None; Sleeves: None; Shorts: None
Bolsel	(Indonesia)	(Indonesia)	(Indonesia) Defender	J Resources	List: Front: None; Back: None; Sleeves: Bonanza; Shorts: None
Celebest	(Indonesia)	(Indonesia)	(Indonesia) Sportif Store	ESSA	List: Front: None; Back: None; Sleeves: None; Shorts: None
Cimahi United	(Indonesia) Teje Junaedi	(Indonesia) Eriyanto	(Indonesia) Asix	Careguard	List: Front: CareFast; Back: Se'Indonesia; Sleeves: None; Shorts: None
Golden	(Indonesia) Yuvelino Kambuyop	(Indonesia) Rustam Riyatno	(Indonesia) Merauke Jersey	Pertamina	List: Front: Papua Selatan, Bank Papua, GoldenMart; Back: Hendrik Nyak, Korindo Group, Papua Selatan; Sleeves: None; Shorts: None
Harin	(Indonesia) Lerby Hidayatullah	(Indonesia)	(Indonesia) Odsey Sport	DeJava	List: Front: UMJ, Lora; Back: DeJava; Sleeves: None; Shorts: None
Makassar City	(Indonesia) Susanto	(Indonesia) Ardiansyah Usman	(Indonesia) HSP Sportwear	Bintang Galaxy Football Academy	List: Front: Fifteen Sport, HSP Sportwear; Back: JEM's Kitchen; Sleeves: None; Shorts: None
Mataram Utama Manggala	(Indonesia) Odie Gama	(Indonesia) Harry Kusuma	(Indonesia) Maxtive	Sinau Ikhlas	List: Front: Sarung Al Hijaz; Back: RS PKU Jogja; Sleeves: None; Shorts: None
MRC Bulukumba	(Indonesia) Agung Batola	(Indonesia) Kifli Rahim	(Indonesia) Marflex	OM KING	List: Front: Harum Lestari; Back: None; Sleeves: None; Shorts: None
Nathan Lebak	(Indonesia) Lingga Ashadi	(Indonesia) Sirvi Arvani	(Indonesia) Nathan Apparel^{1}	None (H) / Nathan Group (A)	List: Front: None (H) / Dua Putra Banten Jaya (A); Back: None; Sleeves: RedZone DPBJ; Shorts: None
Panua GFC	(Indonesia) Kamel Dukalang	(Indonesia)	(Indonesia) Beruang Sport		List: Front: Back: Sleeves: Shorts:
Pasuruan United	(Indonesia) Bio Paulin	(Indonesia) Ricko Hardiansyah	(Indonesia) DJ Sport	PT Asli Juara Indonesia	List: Front: Kopi Langit 81 Trans, DS SoccerField; Back: Sempu Sunset Hill, PT Farhan Afifa Bersaudara; Sleeves: CV Farhan Anugerah Bersama; Shorts: None
Persak	(Indonesia) Gatot Barnowo	(Indonesia) Wisnu Nugroho	(Indonesia) Fortwear	SKN Group	List: Front: Tradha Group, ZiZa Catering; Back: Letter Ale, Bank Jateng; Sleeves: Malindo Corner, Yun’s Accessories; Shorts: None
Persebi Bima	(Indonesia)	(Indonesia)	(Indonesia)	Visit Bima	List: Front: Back: Sleeves: Shorts:
Persebi Boyolali	(Indonesia) Indriyanto Nugroho	(Indonesia) Hendra Pambudi	(Indonesia) Oliver	None	List: Front: BPR BKK Boyolali, Bank Boyolali; Back: Bank Jateng, Umbul Tirtomarto Pengging, Es Teh Padepokan; Sleeves: Pambayun Makeup Studio; Shorts: None
Persebri Batanghari	(Indonesia) Oktavianus	(Indonesia) Khusni Mubarak	(Indonesia) RMB Apparel	None	List: Front: None; Back: None; Sleeves: None; Shorts: None
Persemar	(Indonesia) Syaifullah Nazar	(Indonesia)	(Indonesia) Eazywear	Martapura Griya Indah	List: Front: None; Back: None; Sleeves: None; Shorts: None
Persemay	(Indonesia) Refelino Imbiri	(Indonesia) Valdo Selalowy	(Indonesia) SOQ Print	Persemay Maybrat	List: Front: Bank Papua, KNPI Maybrat, YPM, Nivy Sport; Back: None; Sleeves: ERTH; Shorts: None
Persena	(Indonesia) Edward Togo	(Indonesia)	(Indonesia) Made by club	Bank NTT	List: Front: Nagakeo Regency, Jakarta Experience Board; Back: None; Sleeves: None; Shorts: None
Persenga	(Indonesia) Heru Suharno	(Indonesia) Gedhong Tangguh	(Indonesia) RMB Apparel	CV Rice One	List: Front: PT Borneo Jaya Sakti, CV Rejo Lestari; Back: CV Hokkie, Archimax, Toko Sembako Perintis, Dailyfit; Sleeves: PT Dermawan Niaga Sejahtera, Astro Cafe and Eatery; Shorts: None
Persepam	(Indonesia) Anis Fuad Syamlan	(Indonesia) Arifin Setyadi	(Indonesia) Straightaway	PT Bawang Mas Group	List: Front: None; Back: Cahaya Pro, Straightaway; Sleeves: Mandala Wijaya Tour & Transport; Shorts: None
Persada	(Indonesia) Adnan Mahing	(Indonesia)	(Indonesia) BS23	Bank NTT	List: Front: Back: Sleeves: Shorts:
Persigar	(Indonesia) Angga Permadi	(Indonesia) Asep Budi	(Indonesia) TWLV Apparel	Rumah Sakit Medina (H & A) / Voice of Baceprot (3rd)	List: Front: Garut Hebat, Garut Hebat Super App, Bank Syariah Indonesia (H & A) / None (3rd); Back: None (H & A) / RENEGADE SHEEP (3rd); Sleeves: None (H & A) / No Room for Racism (3rd); Shorts: None
Persigubin	(Indonesia) Imanuel Wanggai	(Indonesia) Renold Mimin	(Indonesia) Galacticos Sportwear	Persigubin	List: Front: Pemda Pegubin; Back: The Morning Star; Sleeves: None; Shorts: None
Persiharjo	(Indonesia) Dwi Joko	(Indonesia) Bayu Yoga	(Indonesia) Oliver	GMABAR	List: Front: PT Sidomulyo Elektrik Indonesia, GiNaSTel; Back: Grafindo, Istana Kado Ulya, Kopi Mbahman, Bank Jateng, Gociko Snack; Sleeves: None; Shorts: None
Persibangga	(Indonesia) Agus Riyanto	(Indonesia) Andre Putra Wibowo	(Indonesia) Kubangga^{1}	PT Andhika Bangunan Perkasa	List: Front: Maklon Kosmetik, BPR Syariah Buana Mitra Perwira, You & Milk, The Samringah WisEd, Javacafe, Bank Jateng; Back: Bumdes Bersama Bintang Persada LKD, Restu Agung Precast; Sleeves: Garda Emas; Shorts: None
Persid	(Indonesia) Agus Yuwono	(Indonesia)	(Indonesia) Raung Apparel^{1}	Singa Merah	List: Front: Bank Jatim, Sahabat BBG, BIG Access GMDP, Karendra Foundation; Back: UIN KHAS Jember, Jember Roxy Square; Sleeves: Mitratani 27; Shorts: None
Persika 1951	(Indonesia) Imral Usman	(Indonesia)	(Indonesia) Alma Apparel	None	List: Front: None; Back: None; Sleeves: None; Shorts: None
Persikoba	(Indonesia) Arif Suyono	(Indonesia) Luthfan Dhudinik	(Indonesia) RMB Apparel	Carabao Hydration	List: Front: Kusuma Agrowisata, Delta Chemica, Pantum Printer Indonesia; Back: Bank Jatim, mBatu SAE; Sleeves: None; Shorts: None
Persikos	(Indonesia) Moyo Malibela	(Indonesia) Engelbert Sani	(Indonesia) BJR Sport	Persikos	List: Front: None; Back: None; Sleeves: None; Shorts: None
Persikotas	(Indonesia) Ronny Remon	(Indonesia) Sulaeman Mahubessy	(Indonesia) Zestien	SIMPATI	List: Front: Bank BJB, Miasso; Back: Primajasa, DIPO Tasikmalaya; Sleeves: Hola Medika, Sinar Mas Land, Indosoccernesia; Shorts: None
Persiker	(Indonesia) Elie Aiboy	(Indonesia) Anis Nabar	(Indonesia) Made by club	Persiker	List: Front: Skyline Media Nusantara, Showroom Tiga Putra Mobil, Bro Ubya Park, KOPMANTARA, IBLAM School of Law; Back: KMJ Autoparts; Sleeves: None; Shorts: None
Persimaju	(Indonesia) Irfan Rahman	(Indonesia)	(Indonesia) IS Apparel	Bank Sulselbar	List: Front: SDK, Kawan Anto; Back: CV Az-Zahra Rental, MZS, Syamsul Samad, Mamuju Keren; Sleeves: Shorts:
Persindra	(Indonesia) Satria Nurzaman	(Indonesia) Seleksen Kartika	(Indonesia) SLEMN24	Pertamina	List: Front: Bank BJB, Ono Surono, Garasi Mini AHL; Back: Diks Gallery; Sleeves: None; Shorts: None
Persinga	(Indonesia) Slamet Riyadi	(Indonesia) Dwi Cahyono	(Indonesia) ADSport	JConnect	List: Front: Mas Antok DRJ, Andri Bolang; Back: Anugerah Dewi Prima; Sleeves: Squades; Shorts: None
Persipegaf	(Indonesia)	(Indonesia)	(Indonesia) Made by club	Persipegaf	List: Front: Pemkab Pegunungan Arfak; Back: Sleeves: Shorts:
Persipani	(Indonesia) Jimmy Saputro	(Indonesia) Karel Gobai	(Indonesia) Zestien	Anak Negeri Paniai	List: Front: None; Back: None; Sleeves: None; Shorts: None
Persipuncak	(Indonesia)	(Indonesia)	(Indonesia) QZF	Cartensz	List: Front: Bank Papua; Back: None; Sleeves: None; Shorts: None
Persiwah	(Indonesia)	(Indonesia) Budiansyah	(Indonesia) Noir Apparel	PT BAI	List: Front: Antam, Bank Kalbar, Pelindo, Maharani, Grand Mini Soccer, Zaula Mini Stadium; Back: Soto Banjar Galuh Bungas, OKE, K@taMB, Indocement; Sleeves: Dester FC; Shorts:
Perslotim	(Indonesia)	(Indonesia) Kharis Lazurdi	(Indonesia) Safasu	Lombok Timur Smart	List: Front: Back: Sleeves: Shorts:
Persma 1960	(Indonesia) Feryandes Rozialta	(Indonesia) Jacky Runtulalo	(Indonesia) GGK Sports	Carabao Hydration	List: Front: None; Back: Bank BSG; Sleeves: None; Shorts: None
Pesik	(Indonesia) Dian Oktovery	(Indonesia) Wildansyah	(Indonesia) Vestikal Pro	YUKK	List: Front: None; Back: None; Sleeves: Kuningan Melesat; Shorts: None
Porsiba Bukit Asam	(Indonesia) Wijay	(Indonesia)	(Indonesia) Novac	Bukit Asam	List: Front: Porsiba; Back: None; Sleeves: None; Shorts: None
PS Badung	(Indonesia) I Komang Mariawan	(Indonesia) I Gede Jeno Wiliantara	(Indonesia) Lord Apparel	Bank BPD Bali	List: Front: None; Back: None; Sleeves: None; Shorts: None
PS Daygun	(Indonesia) Ali Usman	(Indonesia) Fahrurozi	(Indonesia) M Apparel	Bank NTB Syariah	List: Front: Lombok Utara; Back: None; Sleeves: None; Shorts: None
PS Mojokerto Putra	(Indonesia) Denny Rumba	(Indonesia) Rizal Setiawan	(Indonesia) DJ Sport	Vespa SMM	List: Front: Patriots Group; Back: BYOND by BSI, Cleo Pure Water; Sleeves: Hydroplus; Shorts: None
PS Paya Bakung United	(Indonesia) Sakti Yasin Nasution	(Indonesia) Indra Kebuka	(Indonesia) CA Sport	None	List: Front: None; Back: None; Sleeves: None; Shorts: None
PSAP	(Indonesia) Mukhlis Rasyid	(Indonesia)	(Indonesia) Ampon Apparel (H & A) (Indonesia) Beruang Sport (3rd & 4th)	Amat Tong Diesel	List: Front: Nasir Djamil; Back: None; Sleeves: None; Shorts: None
PSJS	(Indonesia)	(Indonesia)	(Indonesia) NAQ Apparel	None	List: Front: None; Back: Teratai FC; Sleeves: None; Shorts: None
PSN	(Indonesia) Kletus Gabhe	(Indonesia) Heron Ago	(Indonesia) Elsport	Pemkab Ngada	List: Front: Sekolah Tinggi Pertanian Flores Bajawa, Air Minum Farry; Back: Dipocenter, Bank NTT, PLN; Sleeves: AWK, Ezio Store; Shorts: None
PSP	(Indonesia) Joni Effendi	(Indonesia) Agung Wijaksono	(Indonesia) RMB Apparel	None	List: Front: None; Back: None; Sleeves: None; Shorts: None
PSPP	(Indonesia) Dian Rama Saputra	(Indonesia) Syaiful Ramadhan	(Indonesia) Limo Apparel	Paperocks Indonesia	List: Front: Padang Panjang, PT Pasifik Multi Global, Ollin; Back: SHMS, PT Hafco Mineral Resources; Sleeves: None; Shorts: None
Sylva Kalteng	(Indonesia) Anang Ma'ruf	(Indonesia) Asri Ibrahim	(Indonesia) Etams	BW Indonesia	List: Front: None; Back: PT PSM; Sleeves: LSP-HATI; Shorts: None
Triple'S Kediri	(Indonesia) Abdullah Choirul Umar	(Indonesia) Fata Briliantino	(Indonesia) Sith Apparel	Kopi Ya!	List: Front: Tellkopi, Sarung Al Hijaz; Back: Sith Apparel; Sleeves: Kediri Movement Center; Shorts: None
TS Saiburai	(Indonesia) Sahala Saragih	(Indonesia) Joko Setiawan	(Indonesia) LJ Sport	Semen Baturaja	List: Front: 31 Group; Back: LJ Sport, Nusantara-Mix; Sleeves: None; Shorts: None
Tunas Muda Bengkulu	(Indonesia) Ujang Jumfrizal	(Indonesia) M. Farhan	(Indonesia) Beruang Sport	Beruang Sport	List: Front: Bank Bengkulu, Rumah Sakit Husada, HES, Truly Sport; Back: Azzahra Catering; Sleeves: None; Shorts: None
Unaaha	(Indonesia) Muhammad Azhar	(Indonesia)	(Indonesia) G-Sport	Pemprov Sultra	List: Front: Pemkab Konawe, Bank Sultra, Bank Bahteramas Sulawesi Tenggara; Back: Sleeves: Shorts:
Villa 2000 B	(Indonesia)	(Indonesia)	(Indonesia) Godsays Football	None	List: Front: None; Back: None; Sleeves: None; Shorts: None
Wahana	(Indonesia)	(Indonesia)	(Indonesia) Egg Apparel	PT Wahanakarsa Swandiri	List: Front: Back: Sleeves: Shorts:
Wamena United	(Indonesia) Thomas Madjar	(Indonesia) Elwin Matuan	(Indonesia) Made by club	Pemerintah Kabupaten Jayawijaya	List: Front: Bank BRI, BNI, Bank Papua, Pertamina APMS Amiruddin; Back: None; Sleeves: None; Shorts: None

Notes:

1. Apparel made by club.

== Schedule ==
The schedule of the national phase is as follows.

Round	Clubs remaining	Draw date	Matchday	Date
First round	64→32	13 May 2026	Matchday 1	30–31 May 2026
First round	64→32	13 May 2026	Matchday 2	2–3 June 2026
First round	64→32	13 May 2026	Matchday 3	5–6 June 2026
Second round	32→16	no draw	Matchday 1	9–10 June 2026
Second round	32→16	no draw	Matchday 2	12–13 June 2026
Second round	32→16	no draw	Matchday 3	15–16 June 2026
Third round	16→8	no draw	Matchday 1	19–20 June 2026
Third round	16→8	no draw	Matchday 2	22–23 June 2026
Third round	16→8	no draw	Matchday 3	25–26 June 2026
Fourth round	8→2	26 June 2026	Matchday 1	29 June 2026
Fourth round	8→2	26 June 2026	Matchday 2	2 July 2026
Fourth round	8→2	26 June 2026	Matchday 3	5 July 2026
Knockout round	2→1	no draw (Note: Pre-determined format)	Semi-finals	8 July 2026
Knockout round	2→1	no draw	Final	11 July 2026

== Venues ==
The venues for the national phase matches are as follows.

Group					Stadium	Location	Capacity	Host
R1	R2	R3	R4	F	Stadium	Location	Capacity	Host
A	–	–	–	–	Benteng Reborn	Tangerang	7,500	Villa 2000 B
B	–	–	–	–	Purnawarman	Purwakarta	10,000	PSSI (Note: Some venues are hosted directly by PSSI Provincial Association.)
C	R	–	–	–	Satria	Purwokerto	5,000	Balikpapan
D	Q	–	–	–	Goentoer Darjono	Purbalingga	15,000	Persibangga
E	–	–	–	–	Amarta	Magelang Regency	15,000	Persma 1960
F	–	–	–	–	Abu Bakrin	Magelang City	10,000	PSSI
G	T	BB	–	–	Sultan Agung	Bantul	30,000	Unaaha
H	S	AA	B4	–	Mandala Krida	Yogyakarta	25,000	Mataram Utama
I	U	–	–	–	Kebo Giro	Boyolali	12,000	Persebi Boyolali
J	–	DD	A4	–	Sriwedari	Surakarta	12,000	Wamena United
K	–	–	–	–	UNS	Surakarta	2,000	Persiker
L	V	CC	–	–	Ketonggo	Ngawi	10,000	Persinga
M	W	–	–	–	Brantas	Batu	7,000	Persikoba
N	–	–	–	–	R. Soedarsono	Pasuruan	15,000	Pasuruan United
O	–	–	–	–	Gelora Ratu Pamelingan	Pamekasan	7,000	Persepam
P	X	–	–	–	Jember Sport Garden	Jember	20,000	Persid

== Draw ==
=== First round drawing ===
The draw for the first round of the National phase was held on 13 May 2026, 14:00 WIB, via the PSSI TV YouTube channel. A total of 64 teams were drawn into 16 groups of four. For the purposes of the draw, the following principles will apply:

- The draw will be conducted freely, with only the host teams will be seeded.
- All other teams will be placed in two unseeded pots:
  - Pot 1 contained the champions from each province.
  - Pot 2 contained the second, third, and subsequent placed teams according to the national round quota allocation.

Note: Bolded teams qualified for the second round.

Seeded (Hosts)	Unseeded	
Seeded (Hosts)	Pot 1	Pot 2
1. (Jakarta) Villa 2000 B (Group A); 2. (East Kalimantan) Balikpapan (Group C); 3. (Central Java) **Persibangga** (Group D); 4. (North Sulawesi) **Persma 1960** (Group E); 5. (Southeast Sulawesi) **Unaaha** (Group G); 6. (Special Region of Yogyakarta) Mataram Utama (Group H); 7. (Central Java) **Persebi Boyolali** (Group I); 8. (Highland Papua) **Wamena United** (Group J); 9. (Papua (province)) **Persiker** (Group K); 10. (East Java) **Persinga** (Group L); 11. (East Java) **Persikoba** (Group M); 12. (East Java) **Pasuruan United** (Group N); 13. (East Java) **Persepam** (Group O); 14. (East Java) **Persid** (Group P)	15. (Aceh) PSAP; 16. (North Sumatra) PS Paya Bakung United; 17. (Riau) **Wahana**; 18. (Riau Islands) **757 Kepri Jaya**; 19. (West Sumatra) **PSP**; 20. (Jambi) Persebri Batanghari; 21. Tunas Muda Bengkulu; 22. (South Sumatra) **Porsiba Bukit Asam**; 23. (Lampung) TS Saiburai; 24. (Banten) Nathan Lebak; 25. (Jakarta) ASIOP; 26. (West Java) **Persikotas**; 27. (West Kalimantan) Persiwah; 28. (Central Kalimantan) Sylva Kalteng; 29. (South Kalimantan) **Persemar**; 30. (Bali) **PS Badung**; 31. (West Nusa Tenggara) PS Daygun; 32. (East Nusa Tenggara) **PSN Ngada**; 33. (Gorontalo) Panua GFC; 34. (Central Sulawesi) **Celebest**; 35. (West Sulawesi) **Persimaju**; 36. (South Sulawesi) **Makassar City**; 37. (Southwest Papua) Persikos; 38. (West Papua (province)) Persipegaf; 39. (Central Papua) **Persipani**; 40. (South Papua) Golden	41. (Aceh) Al-Farlaky; 42. (North Sumatra) Binjai City; 43. (West Sumatra) PSPP; 44. (Banten) Harin; 45. (Jakarta) PSJS; 46. (West Java) Persika 1951; 47. (West Java) **Pesik**; 48. (West Java) **Cimahi United**; 49. (West Java) Persindra; 50. (West Java) **Persigar**; 51. (Central Java) **Persak**; 52. (Central Java) **Persiharjo**; 53. (East Java) **Persenga**; 54. (East Java) PS Mojokerto Putra; 55. (East Java) Triple'S Kediri; 56. (West Nusa Tenggara) Persebi Bima; 57. (West Nusa Tenggara) Perslotim; 58. (East Nusa Tenggara) Persena; 59. (East Nusa Tenggara) **Persada**; 60. (North Sulawesi) Bolsel; 61. (South Sulawesi) **MRC Bulukumba**; 62. (Southwest Papua) **Persemay**; 63. (Central Papua) Persipuncak; 64. (Highland Papua) Persigubin

== First round ==
The 64 teams were drawn into 16 groups of four. The first round was played in a home tournament format of single round-robin matches.

The top two teams of each group were qualified for the second round.

=== Group A ===
All matches will be held at Benteng Reborn Stadium, Tangerang and Purnawarman Stadium, Purwakarta.

Pos	Team	Pld	W	D	L	GF	GA	GD	Pts	Qualification	KNG	BAD	VIL	WAH
1	(West Java) Pesik	3	2	0	1	4	2	+2	6	Qualification to the second round		1–0		
2	(Bali) PS Badung	3	1	1	1	5	2	+3	4 (Note: Ranked on head-to-head points: PS Badung 3, Villa 2000 B 0.)	Qualification to the second round				1–1
3	(Jakarta) Villa 2000 B (H)	3	1	1	1	2	5	−3	4		2–1	0–4		
4	(West Kalimantan) Persiwah	3	0	2	1	1	3	−2	2		0–2		0–1	

Source: Liga 4 national phase
Legend: Blue = home team win; Yellow = draw; Red = away team win.
Rules for classification: 1) Points; 2) Head-to-head points; 3) Head-to-head goal difference; 4) Head-to-head goals scored; 5) Goal difference; 6) Goals scored; 7) Fair-play points; 8) Draw.
(H) Hosts

=== Group B ===
All matches will be held at Purnawarman Stadium, Purwakarta and Benteng Reborn Stadium, Tangerang.

Pos	Team	Pld	W	D	L	GF	GA	GD	Pts	Qualification	MKC	MAR	BIM	PBU
1	(South Sulawesi) Makassar City	3	2	1	0	6	1	+5	7	Qualification to the second round		1–0	1–1	
2	(South Kalimantan) Persemar (H)	3	2	0	1	6	2	+4	6	Qualification to the second round			4–1	2–0
3	(West Nusa Tenggara) Persebi Bima	3	1	1	1	4	5	−1	4					2–0
4	(North Sumatra) PS Paya Bakung United	3	0	0	3	0	8	−8	0		0–4			

Source: Liga 4 national phase
Legend: Blue = home team win; Yellow = draw; Red = away team win.
Rules for classification: 1) Points; 2) Head-to-head points; 3) Head-to-head goal difference; 4) Head-to-head goals scored; 5) Goal difference; 6) Goals scored; 7) Fair-play points; 8) Draw.
(H) Hosts

=== Group C ===
All matches will be held at Satria Stadium, Purwokerto and Goentoer Darjono Stadium, Purbalingga.

Pos	Team	Pld	W	D	L	GF	GA	GD	Pts	Qualification	CMU	757	BPP	PNU
1	(West Java) Cimahi United	3	2	0	1	6	2	+4	6 (Note: Tied on head-to-head points. Ranked on head-to-head goal difference: Cimahi United +1, 757 Kepri Jaya 0, Balikpapan –1.)	Qualification to the second round		0–1		
2	(Riau Islands) 757 Kepri Jaya	3	2	0	1	5	1	+4	6	Qualification to the second round				4–0
3	(East Kalimantan) Balikpapan (H)	3	2	0	1	8	3	+5	6		1–3	1–0		
4	(Gorontalo) Panua GFC	3	0	0	3	0	13	−13	0		0–3		0–6	

Source: Liga 4 national phase
Legend: Blue = home team win; Yellow = draw; Red = away team win.
Rules for classification: 1) Points; 2) Head-to-head points; 3) Head-to-head goal difference; 4) Head-to-head goals scored; 5) Goal difference; 6) Goals scored; 7) Fair-play points; 8) Draw.
(H) Hosts

=== Group D ===
All matches will be held at Goentoer Darjono Stadium, Purbalingga and Satria Stadium, Purwokerto.

Pos	Team	Pld	W	D	L	GF	GA	GD	Pts	Qualification	WFC	BGA	PPP	SYL
1	(Riau) Wahana	3	3	0	0	6	0	+6	9	Qualification to the second round		2–0	1–0	
2	(Central Java) Persibangga (H)	3	2	0	1	4	3	+1	6	Qualification to the second round			3–1	1–0
3	(West Sumatra) PSPP	3	1	0	2	3	5	−2	3					2–1
4	(Central Kalimantan) Sylva Kalteng	3	0	0	3	1	6	−5	0		0–3			

Source: Liga 4 national phase
Legend: Blue = home team win; Yellow = draw; Red = away team win.
Rules for classification: 1) Points; 2) Head-to-head points; 3) Head-to-head goal difference; 4) Head-to-head goals scored; 5) Goal difference; 6) Goals scored; 7) Fair-play points; 8) Draw.
(H) Hosts

=== Group E ===
All matches will be held at Amarta Stadium, Magelang Regency and Abu Bakrin Stadium, Magelang City.

Pos	Team	Pld	W	D	L	GF	GA	GD	Pts	Qualification	PMA	MRC	BRI	NLB
1	(North Sulawesi) Persma 1960 (H)	3	2	1	0	7	1	+6	7	Qualification to the second round		0–0	6–1	
2	(South Sulawesi) MRC Bulukumba	3	1	1	1	2	3	−1	4	Qualification to the second round			2–0	
3	(Jambi) Persebri Batanghari	3	1	0	2	4	10	−6	3 (Note: Ranked on head-to-head points: Persebri Batanghari 3, Nathan Lebak 0.)					3–2
4	(Banten) Nathan Lebak	3	1	0	2	5	4	+1	3		0–1	3–0		

Source: Liga 4 national phase
Legend: Blue = home team win; Yellow = draw; Red = away team win.
Rules for classification: 1) Points; 2) Head-to-head points; 3) Head-to-head goal difference; 4) Head-to-head goals scored; 5) Goal difference; 6) Goals scored; 7) Fair-play points; 8) Draw.
(H) Hosts

=== Group F ===
All matches will be held at Abu Bakrin Stadium, Magelang City and Amarta Stadium, Magelang Regency.

Pos	Team	Pld	W	D	L	GF	GA	GD	Pts	Qualification	PSN	TAS	DYG	FAR
1	(East Nusa Tenggara) PSN	3	1	2	0	6	5	+1	5	Qualification to the second round		3–3		
2	(West Java) Persikotas	3	0	3	0	5	5	0	3	Qualification to the second round			0–0	2–2
3	(West Nusa Tenggara) PS Daygun (H)	3	0	3	0	3	3	0	3		2–2			1–1
4	(Aceh) Al-Farlaky	3	0	2	1	3	4	−1	2		0–1			

Source: Liga 4 national phase
Legend: Blue = home team win; Yellow = draw; Red = away team win.
Rules for classification: 1) Points; 2) Head-to-head points; 3) Head-to-head goal difference; 4) Head-to-head goals scored; 5) Goal difference; 6) Goals scored; 7) Fair-play points; 8) Draw.
(H) Hosts

=== Group G ===
All matches will be held at Sultan Agung Stadium, Bantul and Mandala Krida Stadium, Yogyakarta.

Pos	Team	Pld	W	D	L	GF	GA	GD	Pts	Qualification	MJU	UNA	BJC	PGF
1	(West Sulawesi) Persimaju	3	2	1	0	8	2	+6	7	Qualification to the second round		1–1	2–0	
2	(Southeast Sulawesi) Unaaha (H)	3	2	1	0	7	3	+4	7	Qualification to the second round			2–1	4–1
3	(North Sumatra) Binjai City	3	1	0	2	6	5	+1	3					5–1
4	(West Papua (province)) Persipegaf	3	0	0	3	3	14	−11	0		1–5			

Source: Liga 4 national phase
Legend: Blue = home team win; Yellow = draw; Red = away team win.
Rules for classification: 1) Points; 2) Head-to-head points; 3) Head-to-head goal difference; 4) Head-to-head goals scored; 5) Goal difference; 6) Goals scored; 7) Fair-play points; 8) Draw.
(H) Hosts

=== Group H ===
All matches will be held at Mandala Krida Stadium, Yogyakarta and Sultan Agung Stadium, Bantul.

Pos	Team	Pld	W	D	L	GF	GA	GD	Pts	Qualification	NGJ	PSP	ASP	MUM
1	(East Java) Persenga	3	1	2	0	2	1	+1	5	Qualification to the second round		0–0		
2	(West Sumatra) PSP	3	1	1	1	3	1	+2	4 (Note: Ranked on head-to-head points: PSP 3, ASIOP 0.)	Qualification to the second round			3–0	
3	(Jakarta) ASIOP	3	1	1	1	2	4	−2	4		0–0			2–1
4	(Yogyakarta) Mataram Utama (H)	3	1	0	2	3	4	−1	3		1–2	1–0		

Source: Liga 4 national phase
Legend: Blue = home team win; Yellow = draw; Red = away team win.
Rules for classification: 1) Points; 2) Head-to-head points; 3) Head-to-head goal difference; 4) Head-to-head goals scored; 5) Goal difference; 6) Goals scored; 7) Fair-play points; 8) Draw.
(H) Hosts

=== Group I ===
All matches will be held at Kebo Giro Stadium and Pandan Arang Stadium, Boyolali.

Pos	Team	Pld	W	D	L	GF	GA	GD	Pts	Qualification	BYI	PAN	KRW	IDM
1	(Central Java) Persebi Boyolali (H)	3	2	1	0	4	1	+3	7	Qualification to the second round		1–0		2–0
2	(Central Papua) Persipani	3	2	0	1	3	2	+1	6	Qualification to the second round			1–0	
3	(West Java) Persika 1951	3	0	2	1	2	3	−1	2		1–1			1–1
4	(West Java) Persindra	3	0	1	2	2	5	−3	1			1–2		

Source: Liga 4 national phase
Legend: Blue = home team win; Yellow = draw; Red = away team win.
Rules for classification: 1) Points; 2) Head-to-head points; 3) Head-to-head goal difference; 4) Head-to-head goals scored; 5) Goal difference; 6) Goals scored; 7) Fair-play points; 8) Draw.
(H) Hosts

=== Group J ===
All matches will be held at Sriwedari Stadium and UNS Stadium, Surakarta.

Pos	Team	Pld	W	D	L	GF	GA	GD	Pts	Qualification	PRB	WMU	JFC	TPS
1	(South Sumatra) Porsiba Bukit Asam	3	2	1	0	4	2	+2	7	Qualification to the second round			1–1	
2	(Highland Papua) Wamena United (H)	3	2	0	1	4	3	+1	6	Qualification to the second round	0–1			1–0
3	(Jakarta) PSJS	3	0	2	1	5	6	−1	2			2–3		2–2
4	(East Java) Triple'S Kediri	3	0	1	2	3	5	−2	1		1–2			

Source: Liga 4 national phase
Legend: Blue = home team win; Yellow = draw; Red = away team win.
Rules for classification: 1) Points; 2) Head-to-head points; 3) Head-to-head goal difference; 4) Head-to-head goals scored; 5) Goal difference; 6) Goals scored; 7) Fair-play points; 8) Draw.
(H) Hosts

=== Group K ===
All matches will be held at UNS Stadium and Sriwedari Stadium, Surakarta.

Pos	Team	Pld	W	D	L	GF	GA	GD	Pts	Qualification	CLB	KER	PMP	LOT
1	(Central Sulawesi) Celebest	3	3	0	0	6	2	+4	9	Qualification to the second round			2–1	
2	(Papua (province)) Persiker (H)	3	2	0	1	7	7	0	6	Qualification to the second round	1–3			3–2
3	(East Java) PS Mojokerto Putra	3	1	0	2	5	6	−1	3			2–3		2–1
4	(West Nusa Tenggara) Perslotim	3	0	0	3	3	6	−3	0		0–1			

Source: Liga 4 national phase
Legend: Blue = home team win; Yellow = draw; Red = away team win.
Rules for classification: 1) Points; 2) Head-to-head points; 3) Head-to-head goal difference; 4) Head-to-head goals scored; 5) Goal difference; 6) Goals scored; 7) Fair-play points; 8) Draw.
(H) Hosts

=== Group L ===
All matches will be held at Ketonggo Stadium, Ngawi and Pangeran Timur Stadium, Madiun.

Pos	Team	Pld	W	D	L	GF	GA	GD	Pts	Qualification	NGA	SDA	HFC	TMB
1	(East Java) Persinga (H)	3	3	0	0	12	2	+10	9	Qualification to the second round			4–1	6–1
2	(East Nusa Tenggara) Persada	3	2	0	1	8	3	+5	6	Qualification to the second round	0–2		3–0	
3	(Banten) Harin	3	1	0	2	6	8	−2	3					5–1
4	Tunas Muda Bengkulu	3	0	0	3	3	16	−13	0			1–5		

Source: Liga 4 national phase
Legend: Blue = home team win; Yellow = draw; Red = away team win.
Rules for classification: 1) Points; 2) Head-to-head points; 3) Head-to-head goal difference; 4) Head-to-head goals scored; 5) Goal difference; 6) Goals scored; 7) Fair-play points; 8) Draw.
(H) Hosts

=== Group M ===
All matches will be held at Brantas Stadium, Batu and Cakrawala Universitas Negeri Malang Stadium, Malang.

Pos	Team	Pld	W	D	L	GF	GA	GD	Pts	Qualification	KBA	HRJ	TSS	GUB
1	(East Java) Persikoba (H)	3	1	2	0	4	2	+2	5	Qualification to the second round		1–1	2–0	
2	(Central Java) Persiharjo	3	1	2	0	5	4	+1	5	Qualification to the second round			3–3	
3	(Lampung) TS Saiburai	3	1	1	1	7	6	+1	4					4–1
4	(Highland Papua) Persigubin	3	0	1	2	2	6	−4	1		1–1	0–1		

Source: Liga 4 national phase
Legend: Blue = home team win; Yellow = draw; Red = away team win.
Rules for classification: 1) Points; 2) Head-to-head points; 3) Head-to-head goal difference; 4) Head-to-head goals scored; 5) Goal difference; 6) Goals scored; 7) Fair-play points; 8) Draw.
(H) Hosts

=== Group N ===
All matches will be held at R. Soedarsono Stadium, Pasuruan Regency and Untung Suropati Stadium, Pasuruan City.

Pos	Team	Pld	W	D	L	GF	GA	GD	Pts	Qualification	PSU	GAR	BSL	SIG
1	(East Java) Pasuruan United (H)	3	2	1	0	4	1	+3	7	Qualification to the second round		1–0		1–1
2	(West Java) Persigar	3	1	1	1	4	4	0	4	Qualification to the second round				1–1
3	(North Sulawesi) Bolsel	3	1	0	2	4	6	−2	3		0–2	2–3		
4	(Aceh) PSAP	3	0	2	1	3	4	−1	2				1–2	

Source: Liga 4 national phase
Legend: Blue = home team win; Yellow = draw; Red = away team win.
Rules for classification: 1) Points; 2) Head-to-head points; 3) Head-to-head goal difference; 4) Head-to-head goals scored; 5) Goal difference; 6) Goals scored; 7) Fair-play points; 8) Draw.
(H) Hosts

=== Group O ===
All matches will be held at Gelora Ratu Pamelingan Stadium and Madura United Training Ground, Pamekasan.

Pos	Team	Pld	W	D	L	GF	GA	GD	Pts	Qualification	PAM	SAK	PCK	KOS
1	(East Java) Persepam (H)	3	3	0	0	7	1	+6	9	Qualification to the second round			2–1	4–0
2	(Central Java) Persak	3	2	0	1	4	1	+3	6	Qualification to the second round	0–1		1–0	
3	(Central Papua) Persipuncak	3	0	1	2	1	3	−2	1					0–0
4	(Southwest Papua) Persikos	3	0	1	2	0	7	−7	1			0–3		

Source: Liga 4 national phase
Legend: Blue = home team win; Yellow = draw; Red = away team win.
Rules for classification: 1) Points; 2) Head-to-head points; 3) Head-to-head goal difference; 4) Head-to-head goals scored; 5) Goal difference; 6) Goals scored; 7) Fair-play points; 8) Draw.
(H) Hosts

=== Group P ===
All matches will be held at Jember Sport Garden Stadium, Jember and Semeru Stadium, Lumajang.

Pos	Team	Pld	W	D	L	GF	GA	GD	Pts	Qualification	SID	MAY	GOL	NGK
1	(East Java) Persid (H)	3	3	0	0	6	0	+6	9	Qualification to the second round			4–0	1–0
2	(Southwest Papua) Persemay	3	1	0	2	3	3	0	3 (Note: Tied on head-to-head points. Ranked on head-to-head goal difference: Persemay +1, Golden 0, Persena –1.)	Qualification to the second round	0–1			2–0
3	(South Papua) Golden	3	1	0	2	3	7	−4	3			2–1		
4	(East Nusa Tenggara) Persena	3	1	0	2	2	4	−2	3				2–1	

Source: Liga 4 national phase
Legend: Blue = home team win; Yellow = draw; Red = away team win.
Rules for classification: 1) Points; 2) Head-to-head points; 3) Head-to-head goal difference; 4) Head-to-head goals scored; 5) Goal difference; 6) Goals scored; 7) Fair-play points; 8) Draw.
(H) Hosts

== Second round ==
The 32 teams were divided into 8 groups of four. The second round was played in a home tournament format of single round-robin matches. The top two teams of each group were qualified for the third round.

=== Qualified teams ===
Note: Bolded teams qualified for the third round.

Group	Winners	Runners-up
A	(West Java) **Pesik**	(Bali) PS Badung
B	(South Sulawesi) Makassar City	(South Kalimantan) Persemar
C	(West Java) Cimahi United	(Riau Islands) **757 Kepri Jaya**
D	(Riau) **Wahana**	(Central Java) **Persibangga**
E	(North Sulawesi) **Persma 1960**	(South Sulawesi) MRC Bulukumba
F	(East Nusa Tenggara) **PSN**	(West Java) **Persikotas**
G	(West Sulawesi) Persimaju	(Southeast Sulawesi) **Unaaha**
H	(East Java) Persenga	(West Sumatra) PSP
I	(Central Java) Persebi Boyolali	(Central Papua) **Persipani**
J	(South Sumatra) Porsiba Bukit Asam	(Highland Papua) **Wamena United**
K	(Central Sulawesi) **Celebest**	(Papua (province)) Persiker
L	(East Java) **Persinga**	(East Nusa Tenggara) Persada
M	(East Java) Persikoba	(Central Java) Persiharjo
N	(East Java) **Pasuruan United**	(West Java) **Persigar**
O	(East Java) **Persepam**	(Central Java) **Persak**
P	(East Java) Persid	(Southwest Papua) Persemay

=== Group Q ===
All matches will be held at Goentoer Darjono Stadium, Purbalingga and Satria Stadium, Purwokerto.

Pos	Team	Pld	W	D	L	GF	GA	GD	Pts	Qualification	BGA	KNG	MAR	CMU
1	(Central Java) Persibangga (H)	3	2	1	0	7	3	+4	**7**	Qualification to the third round			3–2	
2	(West Java) Pesik	3	1	1	1	4	4	0	**4**	Qualification to the third round	1–1		2–1	
3	(South Kalimantan) Persemar	3	1	0	2	7	6	+1	**3 (Note: Ranked on head-to-head points: Persemar 3, Cimahi United 0.)**					4–1
4	(West Java) Cimahi United	3	1	0	2	3	8	−5	**3**		0–3	2–1		

Source: Liga 4 national phase
Legend: Blue = home team win; Yellow = draw; Red = away team win.
Rules for classification: 1) Points; 2) Head-to-head points; 3) Head-to-head goal difference; 4) Head-to-head goals scored; 5) Goal difference; 6) Goals scored; 7) Fair-play points; 8) Draw.
(H) Hosts

=== Group R ===
All matches will be held at Satria Stadium, Purwokerto and Goentoer Darjono Stadium, Purbalingga.

Pos	Team	Pld	W	D	L	GF	GA	GD	Pts	Qualification	WFC	757	MKC	BAD
1	(Riau) Wahana	3	2	0	1	4	2	+2	**6**	Qualification to the third round		1–0	0–1	
2	(Riau Islands) 757 Kepri Jaya	3	1	1	1	3	2	+1	**4 (Note: Ranked by head-to-head goal difference: 757 Kepri Jaya +1, Makassar City 0)**	Qualification to the third round				2–0
3	(South Sulawesi) Makassar City	3	1	1	1	3	3	0	**4**			1–1		1–2
4	(Bali) PS Badung	3	1	0	2	3	6	−3	**3**		1–3			

Source: Liga 4 national phase
Legend: Blue = home team win; Yellow = draw; Red = away team win.
Rules for classification: 1) Points; 2) Head-to-head points; 3) Head-to-head goal difference; 4) Head-to-head goals scored; 5) Goal difference; 6) Goals scored; 7) Fair-play points; 8) Draw.

=== Group S ===
All matches will be held at Mandala Krida Stadium, Yogyakarta and Sultan Agung Stadium, Bantul.

Pos	Team	Pld	W	D	L	GF	GA	GD	Pts	Qualification	TAS	PMA	PSP	MJU
1	(West Java) Persikotas	3	2	1	0	4	2	+2	**7**	Qualification to the third round				2–1
2	(North Sulawesi) Persma 1960	3	1	1	1	1	1	0	**4 (Note: Ranked on head-to-head points: Persma 1960 3, PSP 0.)**	Qualification to the third round	0–1		1–0	
3	(West Sumatra) PSP	3	1	1	1	2	2	0	**4**		1–1			
4	(West Sulawesi) Persimaju	3	0	1	2	1	3	−2	**1**			0–0	0–1	

Source: Liga 4 national phase
Legend: Blue = home team win; Yellow = draw; Red = away team win.
Rules for classification: 1) Points; 2) Head-to-head points; 3) Head-to-head goal difference; 4) Head-to-head goals scored; 5) Goal difference; 6) Goals scored; 7) Fair-play points; 8) Draw.

=== Group T ===
All matches will be held at Sultan Agung Stadium, Bantul and Mandala Krida Stadium, Yogyakarta.

Pos	Team	Pld	W	D	L	GF	GA	GD	Pts	Qualification	UNA	PSN	NGJ	MRC
1	(Southeast Sulawesi) Unaaha (H)	3	3	0	0	7	3	+4	**9**	Qualification to the third round				2–1
2	(East Nusa Tenggara) PSN	3	2	0	1	9	3	+6	**6**	Qualification to the third round	1–3			5–0
3	(East Java) Persenga	3	1	0	2	5	6	−1	**3**		1–2	0–3		
4	(South Sulawesi) MRC Bulukumba	3	0	0	3	2	11	−9	**0**				1–4	

Source: Liga 4 national phase
Legend: Blue = home team win; Yellow = draw; Red = away team win.
Rules for classification: 1) Points; 2) Head-to-head points; 3) Head-to-head goal difference; 4) Head-to-head goals scored; 5) Goal difference; 6) Goals scored; 7) Fair-play points; 8) Draw.
(H) Hosts

=== Group U ===
All matches will be held at Kebo Giro Stadium, Boyolali and Sriwedari Stadium, Surakarta.

Pos	Team	Pld	W	D	L	GF	GA	GD	Pts	Qualification	WMU	CLB	SDA	BYI
1	(Highland Papua) Wamena United	3	2	1	0	7	1	+6	**7**	Qualification to the third round		3–0		
2	(Central Sulawesi) Celebest	3	1	1	1	2	4	−2	**4**	Qualification to the third round			1–0	1–1
3	(East Nusa Tenggara) Persada	3	1	0	2	2	5	−3	**3**		0–3			
4	(Central Java) Persebi Boyolali (H)	3	0	2	1	3	4	−1	**2**		1–1		1–2	

Source: Liga 4 national phase
Legend: Blue = home team win; Yellow = draw; Red = away team win.
Rules for classification: 1) Points; 2) Head-to-head points; 3) Head-to-head goal difference; 4) Head-to-head goals scored; 5) Goal difference; 6) Goals scored; 7) Fair-play points; 8) Draw.
(H) Hosts

=== Group V ===
All matches will be held at Ketonggo Stadium, Ngawi and Pangeran Timur Stadium, Madiun.

Pos	Team	Pld	W	D	L	GF	GA	GD	Pts	Qualification	PAN	NGA	PRB	KER
1	(Central Papua) Persipani	3	3	0	0	7	4	+3	**9**	Qualification to the third round		2–1		
2	(East Java) Persinga (H)	3	2	0	1	6	2	+4	**6**	Qualification to the third round			2–0	3–0
3	(South Sumatra) Porsiba Bukit Asam	3	1	0	2	4	6	−2	**3**		3–4			1–0
4	(Papua (province)) Persiker	3	0	0	3	0	5	−5	**0**		0–1			

Source: Liga 4 national phase
Legend: Blue = home team win; Yellow = draw; Red = away team win.
Rules for classification: 1) Points; 2) Head-to-head points; 3) Head-to-head goal difference; 4) Head-to-head goals scored; 5) Goal difference; 6) Goals scored; 7) Fair-play points; 8) Draw.
(H) Hosts

=== Group W ===
All matches will be held at Brantas Stadium, Batu and Cakrawala Universitas Negeri Malang Stadium, Malang.

Pos	Team	Pld	W	D	L	GF	GA	GD	Pts	Qualification	PAM	GAR	MAY	KBA
1	(East Java) Persepam	3	1	2	0	1	0	+1	**5 (Note: Ranked on fair-play points: Persepam > Persigar)**	Qualification to the third round			0–0	1–0
2	(West Java) Persigar	3	1	2	0	1	0	+1	**5**	Qualification to the third round	0–0			
3	(Southwest Papua) Persemay	3	0	2	1	1	2	−1	**2 (Note: Ranked on fair-play points: Persemay > Persikoba)**			0–1		
4	(East Java) Persikoba (H)	3	0	2	1	1	2	−1	**2**			0–0	1–1	

Source: Liga 4 national phase
Legend: Blue = home team win; Yellow = draw; Red = away team win.
Rules for classification: 1) Points; 2) Head-to-head points; 3) Head-to-head goal difference; 4) Head-to-head goals scored; 5) Goal difference; 6) Goals scored; 7) Fair-play points; 8) Draw.
(H) Hosts

=== Group X ===
All matches will be held at Jember Sport Garden Stadium and Notohadinegoro Stadium, Jember.

Pos	Team	Pld	W	D	L	GF	GA	GD	Pts	Qualification	PSU	SAK	SID	HRJ
1	(East Java) Pasuruan United	3	1	2	0	2	1	+1	**5**	Qualification to the third round		1–0		0–0
2	(Central Java) Persak	3	1	1	1	2	2	0	**4 (Note: Ranked on head-to-head points: Persak 3, Persid 0.)**	Qualification to the third round				1–1
3	(East Java) Persid (H)	3	1	1	1	2	2	0	**4**		1–1	0–1		
4	(Central Java) Persiharjo	3	0	2	1	1	2	−1	**2**				0–1	

Source: Liga 4 national phase
Legend: Blue = home team win; Yellow = draw; Red = away team win.
Rules for classification: 1) Points; 2) Head-to-head points; 3) Head-to-head goal difference; 4) Head-to-head goals scored; 5) Goal difference; 6) Goals scored; 7) Fair-play points; 8) Draw.
(H) Hosts

== Third round ==
The 16 teams were divided into 4 groups of four. The third round was played in a home tournament format of single round-robin matches. The top two teams of each group were qualified for the fourth round.

=== Qualified teams ===
Note: Bolded teams qualified for the fourth round.

Group	Winners	Runners-up
Q	(Central Java) **Persibangga**	(West Java) **Pesik**
R	(Riau) Wahana	(Riau Islands) 757 Kepri Jaya
S	(West Java) Persikotas	(North Sulawesi) Persma 1960
T	(Southeast Sulawesi) **Unaaha**	(East Nusa Tenggara) **PSN**
U	(Highland Papua) Wamena United	(Central Sulawesi) Celebest
V	(Central Papua) **Persipani**	(East Java) **Persinga**
W	(East Java) Persepam	(West Java) **Persigar**
X	(East Java) **Pasuruan United**	(Central Java) Persak

=== Group AA ===
All matches will be held at Mandala Krida Stadium, Yogyakarta and Sultan Agung Stadium, Bantul.

Pos	Team	Pld	W	D	L	GF	GA	GD	Pts	Qualification	PSN	BGA	TAS	757
1	(East Nusa Tenggara) PSN	3	2	1	0	8	1	+7	**7 (Note: Ranked on goal difference: PSN +7, Persibangga +3.)**	Qualification to the fourth round				3–0
2	(Central Java) Persibangga	3	2	1	0	5	2	+3	**7**	Qualification to the fourth round	1–1			3–1
3	(West Java) Persikotas	3	1	0	2	3	5	−2	**3**		0–4	0–1		
4	(Riau Islands) 757 Kepri Jaya	3	0	0	3	1	9	−8	**0**				0–3	

Source: Liga 4 national phase
Legend: Blue = home team win; Yellow = draw; Red = away team win.
Rules for classification: 1) Points; 2) Head-to-head points; 3) Head-to-head goal difference; 4) Head-to-head goals scored; 5) Goal difference; 6) Goals scored; 7) Fair-play points; 8) Draw.

=== Group BB ===
All matches will be held at Sultan Agung Stadium, Bantul and Mandala Krida Stadium, Yogyakarta.

Pos	Team	Pld	W	D	L	GF	GA	GD	Pts	Qualification	KNG	UNA	PMA	WFC
1	(West Java) Pesik	3	2	1	0	6	2	+4	**7**	Qualification to the fourth round		1–1		
2	(Southeast Sulawesi) Unaaha (H)	3	1	1	1	5	4	+1	**4**	Qualification to the fourth round			3–1	1–2
3	(North Sulawesi) Persma 1960	3	1	0	2	2	6	−4	**3 (Note: Ranked on head-to-head points: Persma 1960 3, Wahana 0.)**		0–3			
4	(Riau) Wahana	3	1	0	2	3	4	−1	**3**		1–2		0–1	

Source: Liga 4 national phase
Legend: Blue = home team win; Yellow = draw; Red = away team win.
Rules for classification: 1) Points; 2) Head-to-head points; 3) Head-to-head goal difference; 4) Head-to-head goals scored; 5) Goal difference; 6) Goals scored; 7) Fair-play points; 8) Draw.
(H) Hosts

=== Group CC ===
All matches will be held at Ketonggo Stadium, Ngawi and Sriwedari Stadium, Surakarta.

Pos	Team	Pld	W	D	L	GF	GA	GD	Pts	Qualification	NGA	GAR	WMU	SAK
1	(East Java) Persinga (H)	3	2	1	0	7	3	+4	**7**	Qualification to the fourth round		1–1		
2	(West Java) Persigar	3	1	2	0	4	2	+2	**5**	Qualification to the fourth round			1–1	2–0
3	(Highland Papua) Wamena United	3	1	1	1	7	2	+5	**4**		0–1			6–0
4	(Central Java) Persak	3	0	0	3	2	13	−11	**0**		2–5			

Source: Liga 4 national phase
Legend: Blue = home team win; Yellow = draw; Red = away team win.
Rules for classification: 1) Points; 2) Head-to-head points; 3) Head-to-head goal difference; 4) Head-to-head goals scored; 5) Goal difference; 6) Goals scored; 7) Fair-play points; 8) Draw.
(H) Hosts

=== Group DD ===
All matches will be held at Sriwedari Stadium, Surakarta and Ketonggo Stadium, Ngawi.

Pos	Team	Pld	W	D	L	GF	GA	GD	Pts	Qualification	PSU	PAN	CLB	PAM
1	(East Java) Pasuruan United	3	2	1	0	6	2	+4	**7**	Qualification to the fourth round		2–0		2–0
2	(Central Papua) Persipani	3	2	0	1	11	5	+6	**6**	Qualification to the fourth round			3–1	8–2
3	(Central Sulawesi) Celebest	3	1	1	1	8	7	+1	**4**		2–2			
4	(East Java) Persepam	3	0	0	3	4	15	−11	**0**				2–5	

Source: Liga 4 national phase
Legend: Blue = home team win; Yellow = draw; Red = away team win.
Rules for classification: 1) Points; 2) Head-to-head points; 3) Head-to-head goal difference; 4) Head-to-head goals scored; 5) Goal difference; 6) Goals scored; 7) Fair-play points; 8) Draw.

== Fourth round ==
The 8 teams will be drawn into 2 groups of four. The fourth round will be played in a home tournament format of single round-robin matches.

The top two teams of each group will qualify for the knockout round and promoted to Liga Nusantara. The third placed teams of each group also promoted to Liga Nusantara.

=== Qualified teams ===
Note: Bolded teams qualified for the semi-finals and italic teams promoted to Liga Nusantara.

Group	Winners	Runners-up
AA	(East Nusa Tenggara) **PSN**	(Central Java) Persibangga
BB	(West Java) **Pesik**	(Southeast Sulawesi) Unaaha
CC	(East Java) **Persinga**	(West Java) Persigar
DD	(East Java) **Pasuruan United**	(Central Papua) Persipani

=== Group A (fourth round) ===
All matches will be held at Mandala Krida Stadium, Yogyakarta and Sriwedari Stadium, Surakarta.

Pos	Team	Pld	W	D	L	GF	GA	GD	Pts	Promotion	PSU	KNG	PAN	GAR
1	(East Java) Pasuruan United (P)	3	2	0	1	3	1	+2	**6**	Qualification to the semi-final and promotion to Liga Nusantara		2–0	0–1	
2	(West Java) Pesik (P)	3	1	1	1	2	2	0	**4**	Qualification to the semi-final and promotion to Liga Nusantara				2–0
3	(Central Papua) Persipani (P)	3	1	1	1	1	1	0	**4**	Promotion to Liga Nusantara		0–0		
4	(West Java) Persigar	3	1	0	2	1	3	−2	**3**		0–1		1–0	

Source: Liga 4 national phase
Legend: Blue = home team win; Yellow = draw; Red = away team win.
Rules for classification: 1) Points; 2) Head-to-head points; 3) Head-to-head goal difference; 4) Head-to-head goals scored; 5) Goal difference; 6) Goals scored; 7) Fair-play points; 8) Draw.
(P) Promoted

=== Group B (fourth round) ===
All matches will be held at Sriwedari Stadium, Surakarta and Mandala Krida Stadium, Yogyakarta.

Pos	Team	Pld	W	D	L	GF	GA	GD	Pts	Promotion	PSN	NGA	BGA	UNA
1	(East Nusa Tenggara) PSN (P)	3	2	1	0	4	2	+2	**7**	Qualification to the semi-final and promotion to Liga Nusantara				2–1
2	(East Java) Persinga (P)	3	1	1	1	2	2	0	**4**	Qualification to the semi-final and promotion to Liga Nusantara	0–0		2–1	
3	(Central Java) Persibangga (P)	3	1	0	2	7	5	+2	**3 (Note: Ranked by head-to-head points: Persibangga 3, Unaaha 0.)**	Promotion to Liga Nusantara	1–2			
4	(Southeast Sulawesi) Unaaha	3	1	0	2	3	7	−4	**3**			1–0	1–5	

Source: Liga 4 national phase
Legend: Blue = home team win; Yellow = draw; Red = away team win.
Rules for classification: 1) Points; 2) Head-to-head points; 3) Head-to-head goal difference; 4) Head-to-head goals scored; 5) Goal difference; 6) Goals scored; 7) Fair-play points; 8) Draw.
(P) Promoted

== Knockout round ==
The knockout round uses a single-match system. In the event of a draw during regulation time, the match proceeds to a penalty shoot-out to determine the winner. The knockout round is held from 8 to 11 July 2026. Four teams from the fourth round qualify for this round.

=== Qualified teams ===
Note: Bolded teams qualified for the final.

Group	Winners	Runners-up
A4	(East Java) **Pasuruan United**	(West Java) **Pesik**
B4	(East Nusa Tenggara) PSN	(East Java) Persinga

=== Bracket ===
Semi-finals
8 July 2026 — Yogyakarta
(East Java) **Pasuruan United** (p)	**0 (5)**
(East Java) Persinga	0 (4)
8 July 2026 — Surakarta
(East Nusa Tenggara) PSN	1 (4)
(West Java) **Pesik** (p)	**1 (5)**

Final
11 July 2026 — Yogyakarta
**(East Java) Pasuruan United**	**1**
(West Java) Pesik	0

=== Semi-finals ===
8 July 2026
14:30 WIB (UTC+7)

Pasuruan United (East Java)	0–0	(East Java) Persinga
	Report
Penalties
	5–4

Mandala Krida Stadium, Yogyakarta
8 July 2026
14:30 WIB (UTC+7)

PSN (East Nusa Tenggara)	1–1	(West Java) Pesik
	Report
Penalties
	4–5

Sriwedari Stadium, Surakarta

=== Final ===
11 July 2026
14:00 WIB (UTC+7)

Pasuruan United (East Java)	1–0	(West Java) Pesik
Surya 80'	Report

Mandala Krida Stadium, Yogyakarta

== Statistic by region ==
Note: R1: First Round, R2: Second Round, R3: Third Round, R4: Fourth Round, SF: Semi-final, F: Final. W: Winner, RU: Runner-up, E: Eliminated

Region	Teams	R1	R2	R3	R4	SF	F
Java	(East Java) Pasuruan United	W	W	W	W	W	W
Java	(West Java) Pesik	W	RU	W	RU	W	RU
Java	(East Java) Persinga	W	RU	W	RU	E	
Lesser Sunda Islands	(East Nusa Tenggara) PSN	W	RU	W	W	E	
Java	(West Java) Persigar	RU	RU	RU	E		
Java	(Central Java) Persibangga	RU	W	RU	E		
Sulawesi	(Southeast Sulawesi) Unaaha	RU	W	RU	E		
Papua	(Central Papua) Persipani	RU	W	RU	E		
Sumatra	(Riau) Wahana	W	W	E			
Sumatra	(Riau Islands) 757 Kepri Jaya	RU	RU	E			
Java	(West Java) Persikotas	RU	W	E			
Java	(Central Java) Persak	RU	RU	E			
Java	(East Java) Persepam	W	W	E			
Sulawesi	(North Sulawesi) Persma 1960	W	RU	E			
Sulawesi	(Central Sulawesi) Celebest	W	RU	E			
Papua	(Highland Papua) Wamena United	RU	W	E			
Sumatra	(South Sumatra) Porsiba Bukit Asam	W	E				
Sumatra	(West Sumatra) PSP	RU	E				
Kalimantan	(South Kalimantan) Persemar	RU	E				
Java	(West Java) Cimahi United	W	E				
Java	(Central Java) Persebi Boyolali	W	E				
Java	(Central Java) Persiharjo	RU	E				
Java	(East Java) Persikoba	W	E				
Java	(East Java) Persenga	W	E				
Java	(East Java) Persid	W	E				
Lesser Sunda Islands	(Bali) PS Badung	RU	E				
Lesser Sunda Islands	(East Nusa Tenggara) Persada	RU	E				
Sulawesi	(West Sulawesi) Persimaju	W	E				
Sulawesi	(South Sulawesi) Makassar City	W	E				
Sulawesi	(South Sulawesi) MRC Bulukumba	RU	E				
Papua	(Southwest Papua) Persemay	RU	E				
Papua	(Papua (province)) Persiker	RU	E				
Sumatra	(Aceh) PSAP	E					
Sumatra	(Aceh) Al-Farlaky	E					
Sumatra	(North Sumatra) PS Paya Bakung United	E					
Sumatra	(North Sumatra) Binjai City	E					
Sumatra	(West Sumatra) PSPP	E					
Sumatra	(Jambi) Persebri Batanghari	E					
Sumatra	Tunas Muda Bengkulu	E					
Sumatra	(Lampung) TS Saiburai	E					
Kalimantan	(West Kalimantan) Persiwah	E					
Kalimantan	(Central Kalimantan) Sylva Kalteng	E					
Kalimantan	(East Kalimantan) Balikpapan	E					
Java	(Banten) Nathan Lebak	E					
Java	(Banten) Harin	E					
Java	(Jakarta) ASIOP	E					
Java	(Jakarta) PSJS	E					
Java	(Jakarta) Villa 2000 B	E					
Java	(West Java) Persika 1951	E					
Java	(West Java) Persindra	E					
Java	(Special Region of Yogyakarta) Mataram Utama Manggala	E					
Java	(East Java) PS Mojokerto Putra	E					
Java	(East Java) Triple'S Kediri	E					
Lesser Sunda Islands	(West Nusa Tenggara) PS Daygun	E					
Lesser Sunda Islands	(West Nusa Tenggara) Persebi Bima	E					
Lesser Sunda Islands	(West Nusa Tenggara) Perslotim	E					
Lesser Sunda Islands	(East Nusa Tenggara) Persena	E					
Sulawesi	(North Sulawesi) Bolsel	E					
Sulawesi	(Gorontalo) Panua GFC	E					
Papua	(Southwest Papua) Persikos	E					
Papua	(West Papua (province)) Persipegaf	E					
Papua	(Central Papua) Persipuncak	E					
Papua	(Highland Papua) Persigubin	E					
Papua	(South Papua) Golden	E					

== See also ==
- 2025–26 Liga 4
