= 2025–26 Liga 4 =

Second season of the Liga 4 in Indonesia

Liga 4
- Season: 2025–26
- Dates: Regency or city phase: 24 August 2025 – 26 April 2026; Provincial phase: 25 October 2025 – 28 April 2026; National phase: 30 May – 11 July 2026
- Champions: Pasuruan United; 1st Liga 4 title 1st fourth-tier title
- Promoted: Pasuruan United; Persibangga; Persinga; Persipani; Pesik; PSN
- Matches: 183
- Goals: 475 (2.6 per match)
- Biggest win: Provincial phase: Makassar City 21–0 Persibone Bone (12 February 2026); National phase: Persipani Paniai 8–2 Persepam Pamekasan (26 June 2026); Wamena United 6–0 Persak Kebumen (26 June 2026)
- Highest scoring: Provincial phase: Makassar City 21–0 Persibone Bone (12 February 2026); National phase: Persipani Paniai 8–2 Persepam Pamekasan (26 June 2026)

The 2025–26 Liga 4 is the second season of the Liga 4, the fourth tier in the Indonesian football league system and the only amateur competition within the structure. The competition is organized by the PSSI Regency or City Associations during the regency or city phase, by the PSSI Provincial Associations during the provincial phase, and by the PSSI during the national phase.

Pasuruan United won their first national trophy in club history, after defeating Pesik Kuningan in the final match.

== Changes from 2024–25 season ==
For the 2025–26 season, PSSI introduced a new level in the competition system, the regency or city phase, which is contested by clubs that are members of the respective PSSI Regency or City Associations. The best teams from this phase advance to the provincial phase.

The provincial phase is contested by clubs that are members of the PSSI Provincial Associations, along with teams that qualified from the regency or city phase.

== Team changes ==
▲ Promoted to Liga Nusantara	▼ Relegated from Liga Nusantara
Tri Brata Rafflesia; Persika Karanganyar; Pekanbaru; Persebata; Batavia; Perseden; Persinab Sang Maestro; Persitara	Kalteng Putra (withdrew); Sulut United (withdrew); Persipani (disqualified); 757 Kepri Jaya; Persikab; Persipasi; PSCS; PSM Madiun

== Regency or city phase ==
These teams will be the representatives from their regency or city league to be competing in provincial phase. The number of representatives from each regency or city league varies based on their league coefficient, with a minimum of one representative club per league.

Sumatra Region
Regency or city leagues	Winners	Qualified to
Tanah Datar	PSR Rambatan	2025–26 Liga 4 West Sumatra
Java Region
Regency or city leagues	Winners	Qualified to
Bandung City	Riverside Forest	2025 Liga 4 West Java Series 2
Depok	GWR Family	2025 Liga 4 West Java Series 2
Garut	TS Maung Garut	2025 Liga 4 West Java Series 2
Kuningan	Diklat Sepakbola Kuningan	2025 Liga 4 West Java Series 2
Purwakarta	Pelita Yudha Purwakarta	2025 Liga 4 West Java Series 2
Sumedang	Bhatara United	2025 Liga 4 West Java Series 2
Malang Regency	Sinar Mas	2025–26 Liga 4 East Java
Pasuruan Regency	PS Putra Jaya	2025–26 Liga 4 East Java
Surabaya	PS Putra Mars	2025–26 Liga 4 East Java
Lesser Sunda Islands Region
Regency or city leagues	Winners	Qualified to
East Lombok	Angkasa Suela	—
West Lombok	Persilaga Sekotong	—
Kalimantan Region
Regency or city leagues	Winners	Qualified to
Lamandau	Ripon	—
Sulawesi Region
Regency or city leagues	Winners	Qualified to
Donggala	Sinar Laut	2025–26 Liga 4 Central Sulawesi
Palu	AKL 88	2025–26 Liga 4 Central Sulawesi
Parigi Moutong	PS Berlian Tomoli (Note: Liga 4 Parigi Moutong Regency champion, Persikota Kotaraya, officially announced its withdrawal from the 2025–26 Liga 4 Central Sulawesi (provincial phase). The competition committee finally announced that Persikota Kotaraya will be replaced by PS Berlian Tomoli.)	2025–26 Liga 4 Central Sulawesi
Sigi	PS Kaleke Putra	2025–26 Liga 4 Central Sulawesi

== Provincial phase ==
The table below shows the number of teams participating in the 38 provincial leagues and the number of slots allocated to each league for the national phase.

Sumatra Region
Provincial leagues	PT	NS
Aceh	17	2
North Sumatra	17	2
Riau	9	1
Riau Islands	5	1
West Sumatra	10	2
Jambi	7	1
Bengkulu	5	1
Bangka Belitung Islands	–	–
South Sumatra	6	1
Lampung	10	1

Kalimantan Region
Provincial leagues	PT	NS
West Kalimantan	16	1
Central Kalimantan	3	1
South Kalimantan	10	1
East Kalimantan	5	1
North Kalimantan	–	–

Java Region
Provincial leagues	PT	NS
Banten	14	2
Jakarta	22	3
West Java	24 (S1)	6
West Java	47 (S2)	–
Central Java	26	4
(Special Region of Yogyakarta) Yogyakarta	7	1
East Java	69	8

Lesser Sunda Islands Region
Provincial leagues	PT	NS
Bali	7	1
West Nusa Tenggara	27	3
East Nusa Tenggara	28	3

Sulawesi Region
Provincial leagues	PT	NS
North Sulawesi	12	2
Gorontalo	5	1
Central Sulawesi	11	1
West Sulawesi	7	1
South Sulawesi	22	2
Southeast Sulawesi	14	1

Maluku Islands Region
Provincial leagues	PT	NS
North Maluku	–	–
(Maluku (province)) Maluku	–	–

Papua Region
Provincial leagues	PT	NS
Southwest Papua	9	2
(West Papua (province)) West Papua	9	1
Central Papua	7	2
(Papua (province)) Papua	8	1
Highland Papua	12	2
South Papua	5	1

Notes:
- PT (participating teams): Total number of teams participating in each provincial league.
- NS (national slots): Number of slots allocated to each provincial league for the national phase.
- Grey background indicates provinces that did not hold a provincial league competition this season.
- West Java Series 2 has no national slot as it is the second-tier competition of the West Java Provincial League.

=== Qualified teams ===
These teams will be the representatives from their provincial league to be competing in national phase. The number of representatives from each provincial league varies based on their league coefficient, with a minimum of one representative club per league.

Sumatra Region
(Aceh) PSAP Sigli (1st)	(Aceh) Al-Farlaky (2nd)	(North Sumatra) PS Paya Bakung United (1st)	(North Sumatra) Binjai City (3rd) (Note: PS Kwarta, who were runners-up of the 2025–26 Liga 4 North Sumatra, withdrew from the national phase due to financial issues. As a result, Binjai City, who finished third, took over their spot in the national phase.)
(Riau) Wahana (1st)	(Riau Islands) 757 Kepri Jaya (1st)	(West Sumatra) PSP Padang (1st)	(West Sumatra) PSPP Padang Panjang (2nd) (Note: PS Kubu Raya, who were runners-up of the 2025–26 Liga 4 West Kalimantan, withdrew from the national phase due to financial issues. As a result, PSPP Padang Panjang, who finished as runners-up of the 2025–26 Liga 4 West Sumatra, took over their spot in the national phase.)
(Jambi) Persebri Batanghari (1st)	Tunas Muda Bengkulu (1st)	(South Sumatra) Porsiba Bukit Asam (2nd) (Note: Siti Fatimah, who were champions of the 2025–26 Liga 4 South Sumatra, withdrew from the national phase due to financial issues. As a result, Porsiba Bukit Asam, who finished as runners-up, took over their spot in the national phase.)	(Lampung) TS Saiburai (2nd) (Note: Tanggamus Farmers Angonsaka, who were champions of the 2025–26 Liga 4 Lampung, withdrew from the national phase due to internal disputes between club management and their players. As a result, TS Saiburai, who finished as runners-up, took over their spot in the national phase.)
Kalimantan Region
(West Kalimantan) Persiwah Mempawah (1st)	(Central Kalimantan) Sylva Kalteng (1st)	(South Kalimantan) Persemar Martapura (1st)	(East Kalimantan) Balikpapan (1st)
Java Region
(Banten) Nathan Lebak (1st)	(Banten) Harin (2nd)	(Jakarta) ASIOP (1st)	PSJS South Jakarta (2nd)
(Jakarta) Villa 2000 B (3rd)	(West Java) Persikotas Tasikmalaya (1st)	(West Java) Persika 1951 (2nd)	(West Java) Pesik Kuningan (3rd)
(West Java) Cimahi United (4th)	(West Java) Persindra Indramayu (R3)	(West Java) Persigar Garut (R3)	(Central Java) Persibangga Purbalingga (1st)
(Central Java) Persak Kebumen (2nd)	(Central Java) Persiharjo Sukoharjo (SF)	(Central Java) Persebi Boyolali (QF) (Note: PSIR Rembang, who were semifinalists of the 2025–26 Liga 4 Central Java, were disqualified following rioting done by their players, club officials, and supporters in their semi-final defeat against Persak Kebumen. The replacement for their spot in the national phase will be Persebi Boyolali, who lost to PSIR in the quarter-finals.)	(Special Region of Yogyakarta) Mataram Utama Manggala (1st)
(East Java) Persepam Pamekasan (1st)	(East Java) Pasuruan United (2nd)	(East Java) Persid Jember (3rd)	(East Java) Persinga Ngawi (4th)
(East Java) Persenga Nganjuk (R4)	(East Java) Persikoba Batu (R4)	(East Java) PS Mojokerto Putra (R4)	(East Java) Triple'S Kediri (R4)
Lesser Sunda Islands Region
(Bali) PS Badung (1st)	(West Nusa Tenggara) PS Daygun (1st)	(West Nusa Tenggara) Persebi Bima (2nd)	(West Nusa Tenggara) Perslotim East Lombok (3rd)
(East Nusa Tenggara) PSN Ngada (1st)	(East Nusa Tenggara) Persena Nagekeo (2nd)	(East Nusa Tenggara) Persada Southwest Sumba (4th) (Note: Bajak Laut, who finished third-place in the 2025–26 Liga 4 East Nusa Tenggara, were ineligible for the national phase as they were not full members of PSSI East Nusa Tenggara at the time of the competition. Their spot in the national phase were taken over by fourth-placed Persada Southwest Sumba instead.)	
Sulawesi Region
(North Sulawesi) Persma 1960 (1st)	(North Sulawesi) Bolsel (2nd)	(Gorontalo) Panua GFC (1st)	(Central Sulawesi) Celebest (1st)
(West Sulawesi) Persimaju Mamuju (1st)	(South Sulawesi) Makassar City (1st)	(South Sulawesi) MRC Bulukumba (2nd)	(Southeast Sulawesi) Unaaha (1st)
Papua Region
(Southwest Papua) Persikos Sorong (1st)	(Southwest Papua) Persemay Maybrat (2nd)	(West Papua (province)) Persipegaf Arfak Mountains (1st)	(Central Papua) Persipani Paniai (1st)
(Central Papua) Persipuncak Puncak (2nd)	(Papua (province)) Persiker Keerom (1st)	(Highland Papua) Wamena United (1st)	(Highland Papua) Persigubin Bintang Mountains (2nd)
(South Papua) Golden (1st)

== National phase ==
The best 64 teams from the provincial phase will compete in this phase to determine the top 6 teams that will be promoted to 2026–27 Liga Nusantara.

=== Team locations ===
Locations of non-Java-based 2025–26 Liga 4 national phase teams.
Yellow: Provincial league champions; Red: Other qualified teams (based on provincial quota).
Locations of Java-based 2025–26 Liga 4 national phase teams.
Yellow: Provincial league champions; Red: Other qualified teams (based on provincial quota).

=== First round ===
The 64 teams will be drawn into 16 groups of four. The first round will be played in a home tournament format of single round-robin matches.

The top two teams of each group will qualify for the second round.

Group A
Pos	Team	Pld	W	D	L	GF	GA	GD	Pts	Qualification	KNG	BAD	VIL	WAH
1	(West Java) Pesik	3	2	0	1	4	2	+2	6	Qualification to the second round		1–0		
2	(Bali) PS Badung	3	1	1	1	5	2	+3	4 (Note: Ranked on head-to-head points: PS Badung 3, Villa 2000 B 0.)	Qualification to the second round				1–1
3	(Jakarta) Villa 2000 B (H)	3	1	1	1	2	5	−3	4		2–1	0–4		
4	(West Kalimantan) Persiwah	3	0	2	1	1	3	−2	2		0–2		0–1	

Source: Liga 4 national phase
Legend: Blue = home team win; Yellow = draw; Red = away team win.
Rules for classification: 1) Points; 2) Head-to-head points; 3) Head-to-head goal difference; 4) Head-to-head goals scored; 5) Goal difference; 6) Goals scored; 7) Fair-play points; 8) Draw.
(H) Hosts
Notes:

Group B
Pos	Team	Pld	W	D	L	GF	GA	GD	Pts	Qualification	MKC	MAR	BIM	PBU
1	(South Sulawesi) Makassar City	3	2	1	0	6	1	+5	7	Qualification to the second round		1–0	1–1	
2	(South Kalimantan) Persemar (H)	3	2	0	1	6	2	+4	6	Qualification to the second round			4–1	2–0
3	(West Nusa Tenggara) Persebi Bima	3	1	1	1	4	5	−1	4					2–0
4	(North Sumatra) PS Paya Bakung United	3	0	0	3	0	8	−8	0		0–4			

Source: Liga 4 national phase
Legend: Blue = home team win; Yellow = draw; Red = away team win.
Rules for classification: 1) Points; 2) Head-to-head points; 3) Head-to-head goal difference; 4) Head-to-head goals scored; 5) Goal difference; 6) Goals scored; 7) Fair-play points; 8) Draw.
(H) Hosts

Group C
Pos	Team	Pld	W	D	L	GF	GA	GD	Pts	Qualification	CMU	757	BPP	PNU
1	(West Java) Cimahi United	3	2	0	1	6	2	+4	6 (Note: Tied on head-to-head points. Ranked on head-to-head goal difference: Cimahi United +1, 757 Kepri Jaya 0, Balikpapan –1.)	Qualification to the second round		0–1		
2	(Riau Islands) 757 Kepri Jaya	3	2	0	1	5	1	+4	6	Qualification to the second round				4–0
3	(East Kalimantan) Balikpapan (H)	3	2	0	1	8	3	+5	6		1–3	1–0		
4	(Gorontalo) Panua GFC	3	0	0	3	0	13	−13	0		0–3		0–6	

Source: Liga 4 national phase
Legend: Blue = home team win; Yellow = draw; Red = away team win.
Rules for classification: 1) Points; 2) Head-to-head points; 3) Head-to-head goal difference; 4) Head-to-head goals scored; 5) Goal difference; 6) Goals scored; 7) Fair-play points; 8) Draw.
(H) Hosts
Notes:

Group D
Pos	Team	Pld	W	D	L	GF	GA	GD	Pts	Qualification	WFC	BGA	PPP	SYL
1	(Riau) Wahana	3	3	0	0	6	0	+6	9	Qualification to the second round		2–0	1–0	
2	(Central Java) Persibangga (H)	3	2	0	1	4	3	+1	6	Qualification to the second round			3–1	1–0
3	(West Sumatra) PSPP	3	1	0	2	3	5	−2	3					2–1
4	(Central Kalimantan) Sylva Kalteng	3	0	0	3	1	6	−5	0		0–3			

Source: Liga 4 national phase
Legend: Blue = home team win; Yellow = draw; Red = away team win.
Rules for classification: 1) Points; 2) Head-to-head points; 3) Head-to-head goal difference; 4) Head-to-head goals scored; 5) Goal difference; 6) Goals scored; 7) Fair-play points; 8) Draw.
(H) Hosts

Group E
Pos	Team	Pld	W	D	L	GF	GA	GD	Pts	Qualification	PMA	MRC	BRI	NLB
1	(North Sulawesi) Persma 1960 (H)	3	2	1	0	7	1	+6	7	Qualification to the second round		0–0	6–1	
2	(South Sulawesi) MRC Bulukumba	3	1	1	1	2	3	−1	4	Qualification to the second round			2–0	
3	(Jambi) Persebri Batanghari	3	1	0	2	4	10	−6	3 (Note: Ranked on head-to-head points: Persebri Batanghari 3, Nathan Lebak 0.)					3–2
4	(Banten) Nathan Lebak	3	1	0	2	5	4	+1	3		0–1	3–0		

Source: Liga 4 national phase
Legend: Blue = home team win; Yellow = draw; Red = away team win.
Rules for classification: 1) Points; 2) Head-to-head points; 3) Head-to-head goal difference; 4) Head-to-head goals scored; 5) Goal difference; 6) Goals scored; 7) Fair-play points; 8) Draw.
(H) Hosts
Notes:

Group F
Pos	Team	Pld	W	D	L	GF	GA	GD	Pts	Qualification	PSN	TAS	DYG	FAR
1	(East Nusa Tenggara) PSN	3	1	2	0	6	5	+1	5	Qualification to the second round		3–3		
2	(West Java) Persikotas	3	0	3	0	5	5	0	3	Qualification to the second round			0–0	2–2
3	(West Nusa Tenggara) PS Daygun (H)	3	0	3	0	3	3	0	3		2–2			1–1
4	(Aceh) Al-Farlaky	3	0	2	1	3	4	−1	2		0–1			

Source: Liga 4 national phase
Legend: Blue = home team win; Yellow = draw; Red = away team win.
Rules for classification: 1) Points; 2) Head-to-head points; 3) Head-to-head goal difference; 4) Head-to-head goals scored; 5) Goal difference; 6) Goals scored; 7) Fair-play points; 8) Draw.
(H) Hosts

Group G
Pos	Team	Pld	W	D	L	GF	GA	GD	Pts	Qualification	MJU	UNA	BJC	PGF
1	(West Sulawesi) Persimaju	3	2	1	0	8	2	+6	7	Qualification to the second round		1–1	2–0	
2	(Southeast Sulawesi) Unaaha (H)	3	2	1	0	7	3	+4	7	Qualification to the second round			2–1	4–1
3	(North Sumatra) Binjai City	3	1	0	2	6	5	+1	3					5–1
4	(West Papua (province)) Persipegaf	3	0	0	3	3	14	−11	0		1–5			

Source: Liga 4 national phase
Legend: Blue = home team win; Yellow = draw; Red = away team win.
Rules for classification: 1) Points; 2) Head-to-head points; 3) Head-to-head goal difference; 4) Head-to-head goals scored; 5) Goal difference; 6) Goals scored; 7) Fair-play points; 8) Draw.
(H) Hosts

Group H
Pos	Team	Pld	W	D	L	GF	GA	GD	Pts	Qualification	NGJ	PSP	ASP	MUM
1	(East Java) Persenga	3	1	2	0	2	1	+1	5	Qualification to the second round		0–0		
2	(West Sumatra) PSP	3	1	1	1	3	1	+2	4 (Note: Ranked on head-to-head points: PSP 3, ASIOP 0.)	Qualification to the second round			3–0	
3	(Jakarta) ASIOP	3	1	1	1	2	4	−2	4		0–0			2–1
4	(Yogyakarta) Mataram Utama (H)	3	1	0	2	3	4	−1	3		1–2	1–0		

Source: Liga 4 national phase
Legend: Blue = home team win; Yellow = draw; Red = away team win.
Rules for classification: 1) Points; 2) Head-to-head points; 3) Head-to-head goal difference; 4) Head-to-head goals scored; 5) Goal difference; 6) Goals scored; 7) Fair-play points; 8) Draw.
(H) Hosts
Notes:

Group I
Pos	Team	Pld	W	D	L	GF	GA	GD	Pts	Qualification	BYI	PAN	KRW	IDM
1	(Central Java) Persebi Boyolali (H)	3	2	1	0	4	1	+3	7	Qualification to the second round		1–0		2–0
2	(Central Papua) Persipani	3	2	0	1	3	2	+1	6	Qualification to the second round			1–0	
3	(West Java) Persika 1951	3	0	2	1	2	3	−1	2		1–1			1–1
4	(West Java) Persindra	3	0	1	2	2	5	−3	1			1–2		

Source: Liga 4 national phase
Legend: Blue = home team win; Yellow = draw; Red = away team win.
Rules for classification: 1) Points; 2) Head-to-head points; 3) Head-to-head goal difference; 4) Head-to-head goals scored; 5) Goal difference; 6) Goals scored; 7) Fair-play points; 8) Draw.
(H) Hosts

Group J
Pos	Team	Pld	W	D	L	GF	GA	GD	Pts	Qualification	PRB	WMU	JFC	TPS
1	(South Sumatra) Porsiba Bukit Asam	3	2	1	0	4	2	+2	7	Qualification to the second round			1–1	
2	(Highland Papua) Wamena United (H)	3	2	0	1	4	3	+1	6	Qualification to the second round	0–1			1–0
3	(Jakarta) PSJS	3	0	2	1	5	6	−1	2			2–3		2–2
4	(East Java) Triple'S Kediri	3	0	1	2	3	5	−2	1		1–2			

Source: Liga 4 national phase
Legend: Blue = home team win; Yellow = draw; Red = away team win.
Rules for classification: 1) Points; 2) Head-to-head points; 3) Head-to-head goal difference; 4) Head-to-head goals scored; 5) Goal difference; 6) Goals scored; 7) Fair-play points; 8) Draw.
(H) Hosts

Group K
Pos	Team	Pld	W	D	L	GF	GA	GD	Pts	Qualification	CLB	KER	PMP	LOT
1	(Central Sulawesi) Celebest	3	3	0	0	6	2	+4	9	Qualification to the second round			2–1	
2	(Papua (province)) Persiker (H)	3	2	0	1	7	7	0	6	Qualification to the second round	1–3			3–2
3	(East Java) PS Mojokerto Putra	3	1	0	2	5	6	−1	3			2–3		2–1
4	(West Nusa Tenggara) Perslotim	3	0	0	3	3	6	−3	0		0–1			

Source: Liga 4 national phase
Legend: Blue = home team win; Yellow = draw; Red = away team win.
Rules for classification: 1) Points; 2) Head-to-head points; 3) Head-to-head goal difference; 4) Head-to-head goals scored; 5) Goal difference; 6) Goals scored; 7) Fair-play points; 8) Draw.
(H) Hosts

Group L
Pos	Team	Pld	W	D	L	GF	GA	GD	Pts	Qualification	NGA	SDA	HFC	TMB
1	(East Java) Persinga (H)	3	3	0	0	12	2	+10	9	Qualification to the second round			4–1	6–1
2	(East Nusa Tenggara) Persada	3	2	0	1	8	3	+5	6	Qualification to the second round	0–2		3–0	
3	(Banten) Harin	3	1	0	2	6	8	−2	3					5–1
4	Tunas Muda Bengkulu	3	0	0	3	3	16	−13	0			1–5		

Source: Liga 4 national phase
Legend: Blue = home team win; Yellow = draw; Red = away team win.
Rules for classification: 1) Points; 2) Head-to-head points; 3) Head-to-head goal difference; 4) Head-to-head goals scored; 5) Goal difference; 6) Goals scored; 7) Fair-play points; 8) Draw.
(H) Hosts

Group M
Pos	Team	Pld	W	D	L	GF	GA	GD	Pts	Qualification	KBA	HRJ	TSS	GUB
1	(East Java) Persikoba (H)	3	1	2	0	4	2	+2	5	Qualification to the second round		1–1	2–0	
2	(Central Java) Persiharjo	3	1	2	0	5	4	+1	5	Qualification to the second round			3–3	
3	(Lampung) TS Saiburai	3	1	1	1	7	6	+1	4					4–1
4	(Highland Papua) Persigubin	3	0	1	2	2	6	−4	1		1–1	0–1		

Source: Liga 4 national phase
Legend: Blue = home team win; Yellow = draw; Red = away team win.
Rules for classification: 1) Points; 2) Head-to-head points; 3) Head-to-head goal difference; 4) Head-to-head goals scored; 5) Goal difference; 6) Goals scored; 7) Fair-play points; 8) Draw.
(H) Hosts

Group O
Pos	Team	Pld	W	D	L	GF	GA	GD	Pts	Qualification	PAM	SAK	PCK	KOS
1	(East Java) Persepam (H)	3	3	0	0	7	1	+6	9	Qualification to the second round			2–1	4–0
2	(Central Java) Persak	3	2	0	1	4	1	+3	6	Qualification to the second round	0–1		1–0	
3	(Central Papua) Persipuncak	3	0	1	2	1	3	−2	1					0–0
4	(Southwest Papua) Persikos	3	0	1	2	0	7	−7	1			0–3		

Source: Liga 4 national phase
Legend: Blue = home team win; Yellow = draw; Red = away team win.
Rules for classification: 1) Points; 2) Head-to-head points; 3) Head-to-head goal difference; 4) Head-to-head goals scored; 5) Goal difference; 6) Goals scored; 7) Fair-play points; 8) Draw.
(H) Hosts

Group P
Pos	Team	Pld	W	D	L	GF	GA	GD	Pts	Qualification	SID	MAY	GOL	NGK
1	(East Java) Persid (H)	3	3	0	0	6	0	+6	9	Qualification to the second round			4–0	1–0
2	(Southwest Papua) Persemay	3	1	0	2	3	3	0	3 (Note: Tied on head-to-head points. Ranked on head-to-head goal difference: Persemay +1, Golden 0, Persena –1.)	Qualification to the second round	0–1			2–0
3	(South Papua) Golden	3	1	0	2	3	7	−4	3			2–1		
4	(East Nusa Tenggara) Persena	3	1	0	2	2	4	−2	3				2–1	

Source: Liga 4 national phase
Legend: Blue = home team win; Yellow = draw; Red = away team win.
Rules for classification: 1) Points; 2) Head-to-head points; 3) Head-to-head goal difference; 4) Head-to-head goals scored; 5) Goal difference; 6) Goals scored; 7) Fair-play points; 8) Draw.
(H) Hosts

=== Second round ===
The 32 teams will be drawn into 8 groups of four. The second round will be played in a home tournament format of single round-robin matches.

The top two teams of each group will qualify for the third round.

Group Q
Pos	Team	Pld	W	D	L	GF	GA	GD	Pts	Qualification	BGA	KNG	MAR	CMU
1	(Central Java) Persibangga (H)	3	2	1	0	7	3	+4	7	Qualification to the third round			3–2	
2	(West Java) Pesik	3	1	1	1	4	4	0	4	Qualification to the third round	1–1		2–1	
3	(South Kalimantan) Persemar	3	1	0	2	7	6	+1	3 (Note: Ranked on head-to-head points: Persemar 3, Cimahi United 0.)					4–1
4	(West Java) Cimahi United	3	1	0	2	3	8	−5	3		0–3	2–1		

Source: Liga 4 national phase
Legend: Blue = home team win; Yellow = draw; Red = away team win.
Rules for classification: 1) Points; 2) Head-to-head points; 3) Head-to-head goal difference; 4) Head-to-head goals scored; 5) Goal difference; 6) Goals scored; 7) Fair-play points; 8) Draw.
(H) Hosts
Notes:

Group R
Pos	Team	Pld	W	D	L	GF	GA	GD	Pts	Qualification	WFC	757	MKC	BAD
1	(Riau) Wahana	3	2	0	1	4	2	+2	6	Qualification to the third round		1–0	0–1	
2	(Riau Islands) 757 Kepri Jaya	3	1	1	1	3	2	+1	4 (Note: Ranked by head-to-head goal difference: 757 Kepri Jaya +1, Makassar City 0)	Qualification to the third round				2–0
3	(South Sulawesi) Makassar City	3	1	1	1	3	3	0	4			1–1		1–2
4	(Bali) PS Badung	3	1	0	2	3	6	−3	3		1–3			

Source: Liga 4 national phase
Legend: Blue = home team win; Yellow = draw; Red = away team win.
Rules for classification: 1) Points; 2) Head-to-head points; 3) Head-to-head goal difference; 4) Head-to-head goals scored; 5) Goal difference; 6) Goals scored; 7) Fair-play points; 8) Draw.
Notes:

Group S
Pos	Team	Pld	W	D	L	GF	GA	GD	Pts	Qualification	TAS	PMA	PSP	MJU
1	(West Java) Persikotas	3	2	1	0	4	2	+2	7	Qualification to the third round				2–1
2	(North Sulawesi) Persma 1960	3	1	1	1	1	1	0	4 (Note: Ranked on head-to-head points: Persma 1960 3, PSP 0.)	Qualification to the third round	0–1		1–0	
3	(West Sumatra) PSP	3	1	1	1	2	2	0	4		1–1			
4	(West Sulawesi) Persimaju	3	0	1	2	1	3	−2	1			0–0	0–1	

Source: Liga 4 national phase
Legend: Blue = home team win; Yellow = draw; Red = away team win.
Rules for classification: 1) Points; 2) Head-to-head points; 3) Head-to-head goal difference; 4) Head-to-head goals scored; 5) Goal difference; 6) Goals scored; 7) Fair-play points; 8) Draw.
Notes:

Group T
Pos	Team	Pld	W	D	L	GF	GA	GD	Pts	Qualification	UNA	PSN	NGJ	MRC
1	(Southeast Sulawesi) Unaaha (H)	3	3	0	0	7	3	+4	9	Qualification to the third round				2–1
2	(East Nusa Tenggara) PSN	3	2	0	1	9	3	+6	6	Qualification to the third round	1–3			5–0
3	(East Java) Persenga	3	1	0	2	5	6	−1	3		1–2	0–3		
4	(South Sulawesi) MRC Bulukumba	3	0	0	3	2	11	−9	0				1–4	

Source: Liga 4 national phase
Legend: Blue = home team win; Yellow = draw; Red = away team win.
Rules for classification: 1) Points; 2) Head-to-head points; 3) Head-to-head goal difference; 4) Head-to-head goals scored; 5) Goal difference; 6) Goals scored; 7) Fair-play points; 8) Draw.
(H) Hosts

Group U
Pos	Team	Pld	W	D	L	GF	GA	GD	Pts	Qualification	WMU	CLB	SDA	BYI
1	(Highland Papua) Wamena United	3	2	1	0	7	1	+6	7	Qualification to the third round		3–0		
2	(Central Sulawesi) Celebest	3	1	1	1	2	4	−2	4	Qualification to the third round			1–0	1–1
3	(East Nusa Tenggara) Persada	3	1	0	2	2	5	−3	3		0–3			
4	(Central Java) Persebi Boyolali (H)	3	0	2	1	3	4	−1	2		1–1		1–2	

Source: Liga 4 national phase
Legend: Blue = home team win; Yellow = draw; Red = away team win.
Rules for classification: 1) Points; 2) Head-to-head points; 3) Head-to-head goal difference; 4) Head-to-head goals scored; 5) Goal difference; 6) Goals scored; 7) Fair-play points; 8) Draw.
(H) Hosts

Group V
Pos	Team	Pld	W	D	L	GF	GA	GD	Pts	Qualification	PAN	NGA	PRB	KER
1	(Central Papua) Persipani	3	3	0	0	7	4	+3	9	Qualification to the third round		2–1		
2	(East Java) Persinga (H)	3	2	0	1	6	2	+4	6	Qualification to the third round			2–0	3–0
3	(South Sumatra) Porsiba Bukit Asam	3	1	0	2	4	6	−2	3		3–4			1–0
4	(Papua (province)) Persiker	3	0	0	3	0	5	−5	0		0–1			

Source: Liga 4 national phase
Legend: Blue = home team win; Yellow = draw; Red = away team win.
Rules for classification: 1) Points; 2) Head-to-head points; 3) Head-to-head goal difference; 4) Head-to-head goals scored; 5) Goal difference; 6) Goals scored; 7) Fair-play points; 8) Draw.
(H) Hosts

Group W
Pos	Team	Pld	W	D	L	GF	GA	GD	Pts	Qualification	PAM	GAR	MAY	KBA
1	(East Java) Persepam	3	1	2	0	1	0	+1	5 (Note: Ranked on fair-play points: Persepam > Persigar)	Qualification to the third round			0–0	1–0
2	(West Java) Persigar	3	1	2	0	1	0	+1	5	Qualification to the third round	0–0			
3	(Southwest Papua) Persemay	3	0	2	1	1	2	−1	2 (Note: Ranked on fair-play points: Persemay > Persikoba)			0–1		
4	(East Java) Persikoba (H)	3	0	2	1	1	2	−1	2			0–0	1–1	

Source: Liga 4 national phase
Legend: Blue = home team win; Yellow = draw; Red = away team win.
Rules for classification: 1) Points; 2) Head-to-head points; 3) Head-to-head goal difference; 4) Head-to-head goals scored; 5) Goal difference; 6) Goals scored; 7) Fair-play points; 8) Draw.
(H) Hosts
Notes:

Group X
Pos	Team	Pld	W	D	L	GF	GA	GD	Pts	Qualification	PSU	SAK	SID	HRJ
1	(East Java) Pasuruan United	3	1	2	0	2	1	+1	5	Qualification to the third round		1–0		0–0
2	(Central Java) Persak	3	1	1	1	2	2	0	4 (Note: Ranked on head-to-head points: Persak 3, Persid 0.)	Qualification to the third round				1–1
3	(East Java) Persid (H)	3	1	1	1	2	2	0	4		1–1	0–1		
4	(Central Java) Persiharjo	3	0	2	1	1	2	−1	2				0–1	

Source: Liga 4 national phase
Legend: Blue = home team win; Yellow = draw; Red = away team win.
Rules for classification: 1) Points; 2) Head-to-head points; 3) Head-to-head goal difference; 4) Head-to-head goals scored; 5) Goal difference; 6) Goals scored; 7) Fair-play points; 8) Draw.
(H) Hosts

=== Third round ===
The 16 teams will be drawn into 4 groups of four. The second round will be played in a home tournament format of single round-robin matches.

The third round is held from 19 to 26 June 2026. The top two teams of each group will qualify for the knockout round.

Group AA
Pos	Team	Pld	W	D	L	GF	GA	GD	Pts	Qualification	PSN	BGA	TAS	757
1	(East Nusa Tenggara) PSN	3	2	1	0	8	1	+7	7 (Note: Ranked on goal difference: PSN +7, Persibangga +3.)	Qualification to the fourth round				3–0
2	(Central Java) Persibangga	3	2	1	0	5	2	+3	7	Qualification to the fourth round	1–1			3–1
3	(West Java) Persikotas	3	1	0	2	3	5	−2	3		0–4	0–1		
4	(Riau Islands) 757 Kepri Jaya	3	0	0	3	1	9	−8	0				0–3	

Source: Liga 4 national phase
Legend: Blue = home team win; Yellow = draw; Red = away team win.
Rules for classification: 1) Points; 2) Head-to-head points; 3) Head-to-head goal difference; 4) Head-to-head goals scored; 5) Goal difference; 6) Goals scored; 7) Fair-play points; 8) Draw.
Notes:

Group BB
Pos	Team	Pld	W	D	L	GF	GA	GD	Pts	Qualification	KNG	UNA	PMA	WFC
1	(West Java) Pesik	3	2	1	0	6	2	+4	7	Qualification to the fourth round		1–1		
2	(Southeast Sulawesi) Unaaha (H)	3	1	1	1	5	4	+1	4	Qualification to the fourth round			3–1	1–2
3	(North Sulawesi) Persma 1960	3	1	0	2	2	6	−4	3 (Note: Ranked on head-to-head points: Persma 1960 3, Wahana 0.)		0–3			
4	(Riau) Wahana	3	1	0	2	3	4	−1	3		1–2		0–1	

Source: Liga 4 national phase
Legend: Blue = home team win; Yellow = draw; Red = away team win.
Rules for classification: 1) Points; 2) Head-to-head points; 3) Head-to-head goal difference; 4) Head-to-head goals scored; 5) Goal difference; 6) Goals scored; 7) Fair-play points; 8) Draw.
(H) Hosts
Notes:

Group CC
Pos	Team	Pld	W	D	L	GF	GA	GD	Pts	Qualification	NGA	GAR	WMU	SAK
1	(East Java) Persinga (H)	3	2	1	0	7	3	+4	7	Qualification to the fourth round		1–1		
2	(West Java) Persigar	3	1	2	0	4	2	+2	5	Qualification to the fourth round			1–1	2–0
3	(Highland Papua) Wamena United	3	1	1	1	7	2	+5	4		0–1			6–0
4	(Central Java) Persak	3	0	0	3	2	13	−11	0		2–5			

Source: Liga 4 national phase
Legend: Blue = home team win; Yellow = draw; Red = away team win.
Rules for classification: 1) Points; 2) Head-to-head points; 3) Head-to-head goal difference; 4) Head-to-head goals scored; 5) Goal difference; 6) Goals scored; 7) Fair-play points; 8) Draw.
(H) Hosts

Group DD
Pos	Team	Pld	W	D	L	GF	GA	GD	Pts	Qualification	PSU	PAN	CLB	PAM
1	(East Java) Pasuruan United	3	2	1	0	6	2	+4	7	Qualification to the fourth round		2–0		2–0
2	(Central Papua) Persipani	3	2	0	1	11	5	+6	6	Qualification to the fourth round			3–1	8–2
3	(Central Sulawesi) Celebest	3	1	1	1	8	7	+1	4		2–2			
4	(East Java) Persepam	3	0	0	3	4	15	−11	0				2–5	

Source: Liga 4 national phase
Legend: Blue = home team win; Yellow = draw; Red = away team win.
Rules for classification: 1) Points; 2) Head-to-head points; 3) Head-to-head goal difference; 4) Head-to-head goals scored; 5) Goal difference; 6) Goals scored; 7) Fair-play points; 8) Draw.

=== Fourth round ===
The 8 teams will be drawn into 2 groups of four. The second round will be played in a home tournament format of single round-robin matches.

The fourth round is held from 29 June to 5 July 2026. The top two teams of each group will qualify for the knockout round.

Group A (fourth round)
Pos	Team	Pld	W	D	L	GF	GA	GD	Pts	Promotion	PSU	KNG	PAN	GAR
1	(East Java) Pasuruan United (P)	3	2	0	1	3	1	+2	6	Qualification to the semi-final and promotion to Liga Nusantara		2–0	0–1	
2	(West Java) Pesik (P)	3	1	1	1	2	2	0	4	Qualification to the semi-final and promotion to Liga Nusantara				2–0
3	(Central Papua) Persipani (P)	3	1	1	1	1	1	0	4	Promotion to Liga Nusantara		0–0		
4	(West Java) Persigar	3	1	0	2	1	3	−2	3		0–1		1–0	

Source: Liga 4 national phase
Legend: Blue = home team win; Yellow = draw; Red = away team win.
Rules for classification: 1) Points; 2) Head-to-head points; 3) Head-to-head goal difference; 4) Head-to-head goals scored; 5) Goal difference; 6) Goals scored; 7) Fair-play points; 8) Draw.
(P) Promoted

Group B (fourth round)
Pos	Team	Pld	W	D	L	GF	GA	GD	Pts	Promotion	PSN	NGA	BGA	UNA
1	(East Nusa Tenggara) PSN (P)	3	2	1	0	4	2	+2	7	Qualification to the semi-final and promotion to Liga Nusantara				2–1
2	(East Java) Persinga (P)	3	1	1	1	2	2	0	4	Qualification to the semi-final and promotion to Liga Nusantara	0–0		2–1	
3	(Central Java) Persibangga (P)	3	1	0	2	7	5	+2	3 (Note: Ranked by head-to-head points: Persibangga 3, Unaaha 0.)	Promotion to Liga Nusantara	1–2			
4	(Southeast Sulawesi) Unaaha	3	1	0	2	3	7	−4	3			1–0	1–5	

Source: Liga 4 national phase
Legend: Blue = home team win; Yellow = draw; Red = away team win.
Rules for classification: 1) Points; 2) Head-to-head points; 3) Head-to-head goal difference; 4) Head-to-head goals scored; 5) Goal difference; 6) Goals scored; 7) Fair-play points; 8) Draw.
(P) Promoted

=== Knockout round ===
The knockout round uses a single-match system. In the event of a draw during regulation time, the match proceeds to extra time and, if necessary, a penalty shoot-out to determine the winner. The knockout round is held from 8 to 11 July 2026. Four teams from the fourth round qualify for this round.

==== Bracket ====
Semi-finals
8 July 2026 — Yogyakarta
(East Java) Pasuruan United (p)	0 (5)
(East Java) Persinga	0 (4)
8 July 2026 — Surakarta
(East Nusa Tenggara) PSN	1 (4)
(West Java) Pesik (p)	1 (5)

Final
11 July 2026 — Yogyakarta
(East Java) Pasuruan United	1
(West Java) Pesik	0

==== Semi-finals ====
8 July 2026
14:30 WIB (UTC+7)

Pasuruan United (East Java)	0–0	(East Java) Persinga
Penalties
	5–4

Mandala Krida Stadium, Yogyakarta
8 July 2026
14:30 WIB (UTC+7)

PSN (East Nusa Tenggara)	1–1	(West Java) Pesik
Penalties
	4–5

Sriwedari Stadium, Surakarta

==== Final ====
11 July 2026
14:00 WIB (UTC+7)

Pasuruan United (East Java)	1–0	(West Java) Pesik
	Report

Mandala Krida Stadium, Yogyakarta

== See also ==
- 2025–26 Super League
- 2025–26 Championship
- 2025–26 Liga Nusantara
