= 2025 Liga 4 Bandung =

Liga 4 Bandung City (Bandung Utama Cup)
- Season: 2024–25
- Dates: 28 September – 19 October 2025
- Champions: Riverside Forest (1st title)
- Series 2: Riverside Forest

The 2025 Liga 4 Bandung City (also known as 2025 Bandung Utama Cup) was the inaugural season of Liga 4 Bandung and serves as a qualifying round for the 2025 Liga 4 West Java Series 2. The competition is organised by the Provincial Association (Asprov) of PSSI Bandung City.

== Participated teams ==
A total of 26 teams were competed in this season. This competition consisting the football association members of Bandung City PSSI Association and Liga 4 clubs from Bandung City.

== Venues ==
All matches was held in the Sidolig Persib Stadium and Lodaya Field.

== First round ==
A total of 26 teams drawn into 6 groups. The winners of each group along with the runners-up will qualify for the second round.

=== Group A ===
Pos	Team	Pld	W	D	L	GF	GA	GD	Pts	Qualification
1	Inspire Indonesia	4	4	0	0	21	5	+16	12	Qualified to the Second round
2	Riverside Forest	4	3	0	1	12	8	+4	9	Qualified to the Second round
3	Java One's Top	4	0	2	2	9	15	−6	2	
4	Saint Prima	4	0	2	2	7	13	−6	2	
5	Setia	4	0	2	2	8	16	−8	2	

Updated to match(es) played on October 2025. Source: PSSI Bandung City

=== Group B ===
Pos	Team	Pld	W	D	L	GF	GA	GD	Pts	Qualification
1	Sidolig	3	2	1	0	5	3	+2	7	Qualified to the Second round
2	IPI GS	3	1	1	1	5	2	+3	4	Qualified to the Second round
3	Turangga	3	1	0	2	5	9	−4	3	
4	R-MIFA	3	0	2	1	4	5	−1	2	

Updated to match(es) played on October 2025. Source: PSSI Bandung City

=== Group C ===
Pos	Team	Pld	W	D	L	GF	GA	GD	Pts	Qualification
1	Fanshop FA	3	2	1	0	22	4	+18	7	Qualified to the Second round
2	Djanur Kartabraja	3	2	1	0	12	4	+8	7	Qualified to the Second round
3	Sultan Muda	3	1	0	2	8	13	−5	3	
4	POP Polda Jabar	3	0	0	3	7	28	−21	0	

Updated to match(es) played on October 2025. Source: PSSI Bandung City

=== Group D ===
Pos	Team	Pld	W	D	L	GF	GA	GD	Pts	Qualification
1	Pro Duta Maung Bandung	4	3	1	0	12	3	+9	10	Qualified to the Second round
2	Sinar Muda	4	3	0	1	11	7	+4	9	Qualified to the Second round
3	Fatto	4	1	1	2	4	9	−5	4	
4	Progresif Indonesia	4	0	2	2	3	7	−4	2	
5	Bara Siliwangi	4	0	2	2	1	5	−4	2	

Updated to match(es) played on October 2025. Source: PSSI Bandung City

=== Group E ===
Pos	Team	Pld	W	D	L	GF	GA	GD	Pts	Qualification
1	Bina Pakuan	3	3	0	0	21	3	+18	9	Qualified to the Second round
2	Saswco	3	2	0	1	14	9	+5	6	Qualified to the Second round
3	Germanesia	3	1	0	2	5	13	−8	3	
4	Elput	3	0	0	3	5	20	−15	0	

Updated to match(es) played on October 2025. Source: PSSI Bandung City

=== Group F ===
Pos	Team	Pld	W	D	L	GF	GA	GD	Pts	Qualification
1	Tunas Rifo	3	2	1	0	5	3	+2	7	Qualified to the Second round
2	PS UPI	3	1	2	0	3	2	+1	5	Qualified to the Second round
3	Nusaraya	3	1	1	1	5	3	+2	4	
4	Sutiono Lamso	3	0	0	3	3	8	−5	0	

Updated to match(es) played on October 2025. Source: PSSI Bandung City

== Second round ==
A total of 12 teams drawn into 4 groups of three. The winners of each group will qualify for the Semi-finals

=== Group G ===
Pos	Team	Pld	W	D	L	GF	GA	GD	Pts	Qualification
1	Bina Pakuan	2	1	1	0	9	1	+8	4	Qualified to the Semi-finals
2	Sinar Muda	2	1	1	0	2	1	+1	4	
3	Inspire Indonesia	2	0	0	2	2	11	−9	0	

Updated to match(es) played on October 2025. Source: PSSI Bandung City

=== Group H ===
Pos	Team	Pld	W	D	L	GF	GA	GD	Pts	Qualification
1	PS UPI	2	1	1	0	7	2	+5	4	Qualified to the Semi-finals
2	Djanur KTB	2	1	1	0	6	3	+3	4	
3	Sidolig	2	0	0	2	1	9	−8	0	

Updated to match(es) played on October 2025. Source: PSSI Bandung City

=== Group I ===
Pos	Team	Pld	W	D	L	GF	GA	GD	Pts	Qualification
1	Fanshop FA	2	1	1	0	8	1	+7	4	Qualified to the Semi-finals
2	Tunas Rifo	2	1	1	0	3	5	−2	4	
3	IPI GS	2	0	0	2	0	5	−5	0	

Updated to match(es) played on October 2025. Source: PSSI Bandung City

=== Group J ===
Pos	Team	Pld	W	D	L	GF	GA	GD	Pts	Qualification
1	Riverside Forest	2	1	1	0	5	0	+5	4	Qualified to the Semi-finals
2	Pro Duta Maung Bandung	2	1	1	0	5	7	−2	4	
3	Saswco	2	0	0	2	4	7	−3	0	

Updated to match(es) played on October 2025. Source: PSSI Bandung City

== Knockout round ==
The knockout round will be played as a single match. If tied after regulation time, extra time and, if necessary, a penalty shoot-out will be used to decide the winning team.

=== Bracket ===
Semi-finals
16 October 2025 – Bandung
G1	Bina Pakuan	1
H1	PS UPI	0
16 October 2025 – Bandung
I1	Fanshop FA	1
J1	Riverside Forest	2

Final
19 October 2025 – Bandung
Bina Pakuan	0
Riverside Forest	5
Third place play-off
19 October 2025 – Bandung
PS UPI	1 (6)
Fanshop FA (p)	1 (7)

=== Semi-finals ===
16 October 2025
13:30 UTC+7

Bina Pakuan	1–0	PS UPI
	Report

Sidolig Persib Stadium, Bandung
Referee: Ridwan Pahala

16 October 2025
15:30 UTC+7

Fanshop FA	1–2	Riverside Forest
	Report

Sidolig Persib Stadium, Bandung
Referee: Ramdan Mulyadi

=== Third place play-off ===
19 October 2025
13:00 UTC+7

PS UPI	1–1	Fanshop FA
	Report
Penalties
	6–7

Sidolig Persib Stadium, Bandung
Referee: Asep Sandhy Putra M.

=== Final ===
19 October 2025
15:00 UTC+7

Bina Pakuan	0–5	Riverside Forest
	Report

Sidolig Persib Stadium, Bandung
Referee: Yazid Zamzami

== See also ==
- 2025 Liga 4 West Java Series 2
- 2025–26 Liga 4 National phase
