= Depok F.C. =

Indonesian football club

Depok
- Full name: Depok Football Club
- Nickname: The Depok Boys
- Short name: DFC
- Founded: 2022; 4 years ago, as Cimahi United Football Club; 2026; 0 years ago, as Depok Football Club
- Ground: Merpati Stadium
- Capacity: 10,000
- Owner: Samsunan
- Coach: Teje Junaedi
- League: Liga 4
- 2025–26: 4th, in Group Q (National)

Depok Football Club (previously known as Cimahi United Football Club) is an Indonesian football club based in Depok, West Java. They currently compete in the Liga 4 West Java zone.

== History ==
The club was founded in 2022 as Cimahi United Football Club by Joko Wardoyo, a sports figure from the district of Cipageran in Cimahi. Cimahi United started their existence in the lowest tier of Indonesian football, finishing as runners-up in the 2023 Liga 3 West Java Series 2. They then followed that up with a 3rd placed finish in the 2024–25 Liga 4 West Java Series 1, advancing to the national phase as a result where they finished last in their second round group stage.

In 2026 the club was acquired by Dejan Football Club owner Samsunan, who relocated it to Depok and renamed it Depok Football Club. Acting as Dejan's feeder club, Depok Football Club retained their Cimahi United name throughout their 2025–26 Liga 4 campaign, once again advancing out of the West Java zone, this time finishing in 4th place, before once again being eliminated in the second round of the national phase.

== Honours ==
- Liga 3 West Java Series 2
  - Runner-up (1): 2023
- Liga 4 West Java Series 1
  - Third place (1): 2024–25
