= Rudi (footballer) =

Indonesian footballer

Personal information
- Full name: Rudi
- Date of birth: 1 June 1987 (age 39)
- Place of birth: Matur, Agam, Indonesia
- Height: 1.70 m (5 ft 7 in)
- Position: Defensive midfielder

Team information
- Current team: PSPP Padang Panjang
- Number: 7

Youth career
- 2008: PON Sumbar

Senior career*
Years	Team	Apps	(Gls)
2010–2022	Semen Padang	114	(5)
2025–	PSPP Padang Panjang	11	(1)
- * Club domestic league appearances and goals as of 16:34, 4 May 2025 (UTC)

Rudi (born 1 June 1987) is an Indonesian professional footballer who plays as a defensive midfielder for Liga 4 club PSPP Padang Panjang.

== Honours ==
=== Club ===
Semen Padang

- Indonesia Premier League: 2011–12
- Piala Indonesia runner-up: 2012
- Liga 2 runner-up: 2018
