= Syaiful Ramadhan =

Indonesian footballer

Personal information
- Full name: Syaiful Ramadhan
- Date of birth: 30 April 1989 (age 37)
- Place of birth: Deli Serdang, Indonesia
- Height: 1.72 m (5 ft 8 in)
- Position: Left-back

Team information
- Current team: PSPP Padang Panjang
- Number: 28

Senior career*
Years	Team	Apps	(Gls)
2010–2015	PSMS Medan	54	(2)
2015–2017	PS TNI	13	(0)
2017	Mitra Kukar	19	(0)
2018	PSPS Riau	11	(0)
2018	Persis Solo	6	(0)
2019–2021	PSMS Medan	34	(0)
2022–2023	PSS Sleman	17	(0)
2023–2024	Semen Padang	19	(0)
2024	PSMS Medan	7	(0)
2025	Persekat Tegal	7	(0)
2026–	PSPP Padang Panjang	0	(0)
- * Club domestic league appearances and goals as of 25 February 2025

Syaiful Ramadhan (born 30 April 1989, in Medan) is an Indonesian professional footballer who plays as a left-back for Liga 4 club PSPP Padang Panjang.

== Club career ==
=== PS TNI ===
Syaiful made his debut against Mitra Kukar in the third week of 2016 Indonesia Soccer Championship A.

=== PSMS Medan ===
He was signed for PSMS Medan to play in Liga 2 in the 2019 season. He made 34 league appearances for PSMS Medan.

=== PSS Sleman ===
In 2022, Syaiful signed a contract with Indonesian Liga 1 club PSS Sleman. He made his league debut on 18 January 2022 in a match against Madura United at the Kapten I Wayan Dipta Stadium, Gianyar.

== Honours ==
Semen Padang

- Liga 2 runner-up: 2023–24
