= 2025–26 Liga 4 Bengkulu =

Liga 4 Bengkulu
- Season: 2025–26
- Dates: 2 February – 3 April 2026
- Champions: Tunas Muda Bengkulu
- Runner up: PS IM Bengkulu
- National phase: Tunas Muda Bengkulu

The 2025–26 Liga 4 Bengkulu will be the second season of Liga 4 Bengkulu after the change in the structure of Indonesian football competition and serves as a qualifying round for the national phase of the 2025–26 Liga 4.

Tri Brata Rafflesia are the defending champions but will not be able to defend their title as they're promoted to Liga Nusantara as the champions of 2024–25 Liga 4.

== Teams ==
=== Teams changes ===
The following teams changed division after the 2024–25 season.

▲ Promoted to Liga Nusantara
- Tri Brata Rafflesia

=== Participating teams ===
A total of 5 teams are competing in this season.

| No | Team | Location | 2024–25 season |
|---|---|---|---|
| 1 | Bengkulu Putra | Bengkulu City | Second place |
| 2 | PS IM Bengkulu | Bengkulu City | — |
| 3 | Tunas Muda Bengkulu | Bengkulu City | Third place |
| 4 | Avrilia Hafiz | Seluma Regency | — |
| 5 | PS Seluma | Seluma Regency | — |

== Venue ==
The 2025–26 Liga 4 Bengkulu competition was held centrally, while the match venue used by the Provincial Association (Asprov) of PSSI Bengkulu was the Semarak Stadium in Bengkulu City.

== Standings ==
| Pos | Team | Pld | W | D | L | GF | GA | GD | Pts | Qualification |
|---|---|---|---|---|---|---|---|---|---|---|
| 1 | Tunas Muda Bengkulu | 8 | 6 | 1 | 1 | 21 | 8 | +13 | 19 | Qualified for the national round |
| 2 | PS IM Bengkulu | 8 | 4 | 2 | 2 | 13 | 10 | +3 | 14 | |
| 3 | PS Seluma | 8 | 3 | 4 | 1 | 11 | 5 | +6 | 13 | |
| 4 | Avrilia Hafiz | 8 | 1 | 3 | 4 | 20 | 23 | −3 | 6 | |
| 5 | Bengkulu Putra | 8 | 1 | 0 | 7 | 7 | 26 | −19 | 3 | |

Source: Liga 4 Bengkulu

== See also ==
- 2025–26 Liga 4
