= 2025–26 Liga 4 Special Region of Yogyakarta =

Liga 4 Special Region of Yogyakarta
- Season: 2025–26
- Dates: 2 December 2025 – 18 January 2026
- Champions: Mataram Utama (1st title)
- National phase: Mataram Utama
- Matches: 22
- Goals: 85 (3.86 per match)

The 2025–26 Liga 4 Special Region of Yogyakarta is the second season of Liga 4 Yogyakarta after the structural changes of Indonesian football competition and serves as a qualifying round for the national phase of the 2025–26 Liga 4. The competition is organised by the Special Region of Yogyakarta Provincial PSSI Association.

== Teams ==
=== Participating teams ===
A total of 7 teams are competing in this season.

No	Team	Location	2024–25 season
1	Duta Pro Bina Taruna	Bantul Regency	Runner-up
2	JK United	Bantul Regency	3rd
3	PS HW UMY	Bantul Regency	Champions
4	Mataram Utama	Yogyakarta City	4th
5	UAD	Yogyakarta City	5th
6	KAFI	Sleman Regency	—
7	Gukiti	Gunungkidul Regency	7th

== Regular round ==
The regular round contains 7 teams that will play in a single round-robin format. The winner and runner-up will be advance to the final.

Pos	Team	Pld	W	D	L	GF	GA	GD	Pts	Qualification
1	Mataram Utama	6	5	1	0	18	6	+12	16	Qualification to the Final
2	KAFI	6	5	0	1	14	2	+12	15	Qualification to the Final
3	PS HW UMY	6	3	1	2	17	7	+10	10	
4	JK United	6	2	2	2	8	10	−2	8	
5	UAD	6	2	1	3	9	9	0	7	
6	Gukiti	6	1	0	5	7	25	−18	3	
7	Duta Pro Bina Taruna	6	0	1	5	7	21	−14	−2	

Source: Liga 4 Piala Gubernur DIY
Rules for classification: 1) Points; 2) Head-to-head points; 3) Head-to-head goal difference; 4) Head-to-head goals scored; 5) Goal difference; 6) Goals scored; 7) Fair-play points; 8) Draw.

== Final ==
The final will be played as a single match. If tied after regulation time, extra time and, if necessary, a penalty shoot-out will be used to decide the winning team.

18 January 2026
14:00 WIB (UTC+7)

Mataram Utama	3–2 (a.e.t.)	KAFI

Mandala Krida Stadium, Yogyakarta

== See also ==
- 2025–26 Liga 4
