= 2025–26 Liga 4 Gorontalo =

Liga 4 Gorontalo
- Season: 2025–26
- Dates: 7 – 17 February 2026
- Champions: Panua GFC (1st title)
- National phase: Panua GFC

The 2025–26 Liga 4 Gorontalo will be the second season of Liga 4 Gorontalo after the change in the structure of Indonesian football competition and serves as a qualifying round for the national phase of the 2025–26 Liga 4.

The competition is organised by the Gorontalo Provincial PSSI Association.

== Teams ==
A total of 5 teams are competing in this season.

No	Team	Location	2024–25 season
1	Dengilo	Pohuwato Regency	—
2	Panua GFC	Pohuwato Regency	Third place
3	PS Boalemo	Boalemo Regency	Fourth place^{1}
4	Boliyohuto	Gorontalo Regency	Seventh place
5	Kreasindo	Gorontalo	Champions^{2}

Notes:

1. as PSB–Metro Mananggu
2. as Kreasindo–Rajawali Sultan

== Group stage ==
=== Standings ===
Pos	Team	Pld	W	D	L	GF	GA	GD	Pts	Qualification
1	Kreasindo	4	3	1	0	10	7	+3	10	Qualify for the finals and national phase
2	Panua GFC	4	3	0	1	18	6	+12	9	Qualify for the finals and national phase
3	PS Boalemo	4	2	1	1	10	4	+6	7	
4	Dengilo	4	1	0	3	3	10	−7	3	
5	Boliyohuto	4	0	0	4	4	18	−14	0	

Source: Liga 4 2025 Gorontalo

== Finals ==
17 February 2025
15:00 WITA (UTC+8)

Kreasindo	1–6	Panua GFC

Merdeka Stadium, Gorontalo

== See also ==
- 2025–26 Liga 4
