= Persikotas Tasikmalaya =

Indonesian football club

Persikotas
- Full name: Persatuan Sepakbola Kota Tasikmalaya
- Nickname: Laskar Wiradadaha
- Founded: 2 November 2002; 23 years ago
- Ground: Wiradadaha Stadium, Tasikmalaya, West Java, Indonesia
- Capacity: 10,000
- Owner: Tasikmalaya City Government
- Chairman: Ecep Suwardaniyasa
- Coach: Ronny Remon
- League: Liga 4
- 2025–26: 3rd, (Group AA in National Phase Third round)
- Website: persikotas.com
Home colours	Away colours

Persatuan Sepakbola Indonesia Kota Tasikmalaya, commonly known as Persikotas, is an Indonesian football club based in Tasikmalaya, West Java. They currently compete in the Liga 4 West Java zone.

== Season-by-season records ==
Season	League/Division	Tms.	Pos.	Piala Indonesia
2007	Third Division		eliminated in provincial phase	—
2008	Third Division		1st	—
2009–10	Second Division	81	unknown	—
2010–11	Second Division	62	first round, 3rd in Group VIII	—
2012	Second Division (LPIS)	81	first round, 5th in Group VIII	—
2013	Second Division	73	first round, 7th in Group E	—
2014	Liga Nusantara	32	eliminated in provincial phase	—
2015	Liga Nusantara	season abandoned		—
2016	ISC Liga Nusantara	32	Round of 16	—
2017				
2018
2019
2020
2021–22
2022–23
2023–24
2024–25	Liga 4	64	eliminated in provincial phase	—
2025–26	Liga 4	64	third round, 3rd in Group AA	—
2026–27	Liga 4			—

== Honours ==
- Liga Indonesia Third Division
  - Champions (1): 2008
- Liga 4 West Java Series 1
  - Champions (1): 2025–26
