= 2025–26 Liga 4 South Sumatra =

Liga 4 South Sumatra
- Season: 2025–26
- Dates: 27 January – 4 February 2026
- Champions: Siti Fatimah (1st title)
- National phase: Siti Fatimah

The 2025–26 Liga 4 South Sumatra will be the second season of Liga 4 South Sumatra after the change in the structure of Indonesian football competition and serves as a qualifying round for the national phase of the 2025–26 Liga 4.

PS Palembang are the defending champions but will not be able to defend their title as they're not participating in this season.

== Teams ==
A total of 6 teams are competing in this season.

| No | Team | Location | 2024–25 season |
|---|---|---|---|
| 1 | Porsiba | Muara Enim Regency | 3rd in Second round |
| 2 | David | Palembang City | 5th in Second round |
| 3 | Persegrata | Palembang City | — |
| 4 | PS Tria | Palembang City | First round (4th in Group A)^{1} |
| 5 | Siti Fatimah | Palembang City | — |
| 6 | UNSRI United | Palembang City | — |

Notes:

1. as PersiOKUT Tria

== Group stage ==
| Pos | Team | Pld | W | D | L | GF | GA | GD | Pts | Qualification |
|---|---|---|---|---|---|---|---|---|---|---|
| 1 | Siti Fatimah | 5 | 5 | 0 | 0 | 19 | 3 | +16 | 15 | Advanced to the Final |
| 2 | Porsiba Bukit Asam | 5 | 4 | 0 | 1 | 17 | 1 | +16 | 12 | Advanced to the Final |
| 3 | UNSRI United | 5 | 2 | 1 | 2 | 9 | 6 | +3 | 7 | |
| 4 | David | 5 | 2 | 1 | 2 | 9 | 10 | −1 | 7 | |
| 5 | Persegrata | 5 | 1 | 0 | 4 | 5 | 27 | −22 | 3 | |
| 6 | PS Tria | 5 | 0 | 0 | 5 | 2 | 14 | −12 | 0 | |

Source: Liga 4 2025 Sumsel

== Final ==
The final will be played as a single match. If tied after regulation time, extra time and, if necessary, a penalty shoot-out will be used to decide the winning team.

4 February 2026
14:30 WIB (UTC+7)

| Siti Fatimah | 2–1 | Porsiba |

== See also ==
- 2025–26 Liga 4
