= 2025–26 Liga 4 Bali =

Football season in Indonesia

Liga 4 Bali
- Season: 2025–26
- Dates: 27 January – 17 February 2026
- Champions: PS Badung (1st title)
- National phase: PS Badung
- Matches: 23
- Goals: 119 (5.17 per match)
- Top goalscorer: Sirilus Esra (9 goals)
- Highest scoring: Titan Alpha Bali 7–4 Bali (29 January 2026); Bali 0–11 MIFA (6 February 2026)

The 2025–26 Liga 4 Bali season was the second season of Liga 4 Bali under its current league division format, serving as a qualifying round for the national phase of the 2025–26 Liga 4. It began on 27 January and ended on 17 February 2026.

Perseden were the defending champions. PS Badung won their first title, defeating MIFA 2–1 on aggregate in the final.

== Changes from 2024–25 ==
The number of participating teams decreased from the previous season. While nine teams competed last season, only seven teams took part this season. The defending champions, Perseden, did not participate after earning promotion to Liga Nusantara. Other teams from last season that did not compete this season included PS Jembrana, PS Putra Angkasa Kapal, Sahadewa Galapagos United, and Tunas Muda Ubud. Meanwhile, MIFA, Bali, and Putra Tresna Bali returned to the competition this season.

The competition format has also changed from the previous season. Last season, the teams were divided into two groups of five and four teams respectively, with the top two teams from each group advancing to the semi-finals. This season, all teams competed in a single round-robin format. The top two teams advanced to the final, while the third- and fourth-placed teams contested the third-place play-off.

The match venues also changed from the previous season, which was held at Banteng Seminyak Field, Badung and Pecangakan Stadium, Jembrana, to Ngurah Rai Stadium, Denpasar and the Bali United Training Center, Gianyar.

== Teams ==
A total of seven teams competed in the season.

Locations of the 2025–26 Liga 4 Bali teams

Team	Regency or city association
Bali	Denpasar
MIFA	Badung
PS Badung	Badung
Putra Tresna Bali	Denpasar
Singaraja Zona Fair Play	Buleleng
Titan Alpha Bali	Denpasar
Undiksha	Buleleng

== League stage ==
In this stage, all teams played each other in a single round-robin format, with the top two teams advancing to a two-legged final and the third and fourth-placed teams contested a two-legged third place play-off. The matches took place from 27 January to 11 February 2026.

=== Standings ===
Pos	Team	Pld	W	D	L	GF	GA	GD	Pts	Qualification
1	MIFA	6	6	0	0	30	4	+26	18	Advance to the final
2	PS Badung	6	5	0	1	23	6	+17	15	Advance to the final
3	Titan Alpha Bali	6	3	0	3	19	29	−10	9	Advance to the third place play-off
4	Putra Tresna Bali	6	2	1	3	15	11	+4	7	Advance to the third place play-off
5	Singaraja Zona Fair Play (Note: Singaraja ZFP were deducted three points following an official decision by the Liga 4 PSSI Bali Disciplinary Committee.)	6	3	0	3	12	13	−1	6	
6	Undiksha	6	1	1	4	13	15	−2	4	
7	Bali	6	0	0	6	6	40	−34	0	

=== Results ===
Home \ Away	BFC	MIFA	BDG	PTR	SZFP	TAPB	UDKS
Bali	—	0–11	1–7	1–7	—	—	—
MIFA	—	—	2–1	—	—	8–1	4–2
PS Badung	—	—	—	3–0	—	7–2	2–0
Putra Tresna Bali	—	0–1	—	—	3–0 (Note: Putra Tresna Bali were awarded 3–0 win following an official decision by the Liga 4 PSSI Bali Disciplinary Committee.)	—	2–2
Singaraja Zona Fair Play	3–0 (Note: Singaraja ZFP were awarded 3–0 walkover win.)	0–4	1–3	—	—	—	—
Titan Alpha Bali	7–4	—	—	4–3	1–5	—	—
Undiksha	5–0	—		—	2–3	2–4	—

Legend: Blue = home team win; Yellow = draw; Red = away team win.

== Final stage ==
The first legs were played on 14 February, and the second legs on 17 February 2026.

=== Third place play-off ===
Team 1	Agg.	Team 2	1st leg	2nd leg
Titan Alpha Bali	2–2 (5–3 p)	Putra Tresna Bali	0–2	2–0 (a.e.t.)

=== Final ===
Team 1	Agg.	Team 2	1st leg	2nd leg
MIFA	1–2	PS Badung	1–2	0–0

== See also ==
- 2025–26 Liga 4
