= 2025–26 Liga 4 Riau Islands =

Liga 4 Riau Islands
- Season: 2025–26
- Dates: 31 January – 8 February 2026
- Champions: 757 Kepri Jaya (4th title)
- National phase: 757 Kepri Jaya

The 2025–26 Liga 4 Riau will be the inaugural season of Liga 4 Riau Islands after the change in the structure of Indonesian football competition and serves as a qualifying round for the national phase of the 2025–26 Liga 4.

The competition is organised by the Riau Islands Provincial PSSI Association.

== Venue ==
All matches will be held at Badang Perkasa Stadium, Great Karimun Island.

== Teams ==
=== Teams changes ===
The following teams changed division after the 2024–25 season.

▼ Relegated from Liga Nusantara
- 757 Kepri Jaya

=== Participating teams ===
A total of 5 teams are competing in this season.

No	Team	Location
1	757 Kepri Jaya	Batam City
2	MBS United	Batam City
3	Buana Citra Karimun	Karimun Regency
4	PS Karimun	Karimun Regency
5	VTT United	Karimun Regency

== Standings ==
Pos	Team	Pld	W	D	L	GF	GA	GD	Pts	Qualification
1	757 Kepri Jaya (C)	4	4	0	0	22	0	+22	12	Qualification for the National phase
2	PS Karimun	4	3	0	1	21	6	+15	9	
3	Buana Citra Karimun	4	1	1	2	7	12	−5	4	
4	MBS United	4	1	1	2	7	11	−4	4	
5	VTT United	4	0	0	4	2	30	−28	0	

Source: Liga 4 Riau Islands
(C) Champions
