= 2025–26 Liga 4 West Sumatra =

Liga 4 West Sumatra
- Season: 2025–26
- Dates: 22 January – 2 April 2026
- Champions: PSP Padang
- Runner up: PSPP Padang Panjang
- National phase: PSP Padang; PSPP Padang Panjang

The 2025–26 Liga 4 West Sumatra will be the second season of Liga 4 West Sumatra after the change in the structure of Indonesian football competition and serves as a qualifying round for the national phase of the 2025–26 Liga 4.

The competition is organised by the West Sumatra Provincial PSSI Association.

== Teams ==
=== Participating teams ===
A total of 10 teams are competing in this season.

No	Team	Location	2024–25 season
1	Batang Anai	Padang Pariaman Regency	5th place
2	Josal	Padang Pariaman Regency	Champions
3	PSLA	Padang Pariaman Regency	—
4	PSPP	Padang Panjang City	Runner-up
5	Gumarang FKNB	Tanah Datar Regency	6th place
6	GMR	Tanah Datar Regency	3rd place
7	PSR^{1}	Tanah Datar Regency	—
8	Gaung Putra	Padang City	—
9	Kompak Kampung Pisang	Padang City	—
10	PSP	Padang City	—

Notes:

1. 2025–26 Liga 4 Tanah Datar champions.

== Regular round ==
The regular round contains 10 teams that will play in a single round-robin format. The top four will be advance to the knockout round.

All matches will be held at and Gelora Haji Agus Salim Stadium, Padang and West Sumatra Main Stadium, Padang Pariaman.

Pos	Team	Pld	W	D	L	GF	GA	GD	Pts	Qualification
1	PSP	9	9	0	0	50	6	+44	27	Qualification to the knockout round
2	PSPP	9	7	1	1	33	8	+25	22	Qualification to the knockout round
3	PSLA	9	6	0	3	28	15	+13	18	Qualification to the knockout round
4	Kompak Kampung Pisang	9	5	2	2	22	20	+2	17	Qualification to the knockout round
5	Batang Anai	9	5	0	4	16	23	−7	15	
6	Josal	9	4	1	4	14	12	+2	13	
7	GMR	9	3	1	5	13	11	+2	10	
8	Gaung Putra	9	1	2	6	7	33	−26	5	
9	Gumarang FKNB	9	1	1	7	10	42	−32	4	
10	PSR	9	0	0	9	5	28	−23	0	

Source: Liga 4 West Sumatra
Rules for classification: 1) Points; 2) Head-to-head points; 3) Head-to-head goal difference; 4) Head-to-head goals scored; 5) Goal difference; 6) Goals scored; 7) Fair-play points; 8) Draw.

== Knockout stage ==
The knockout stage transitioned into a double round-robin semi-final format, where the four qualifying teams competed in a series of two matches each to determine the finalists. All matches were hosted at the West Sumatra Main Stadium (Stadion Utama Sumatera Barat). The fixtures were scheduled across two matchdays, held on 29 March and 31 March 2026.

=== Bracket ===
Semi-finals (Double Round)
(SF1) 29 & 31 March 2026 — SUSB, Padang Pariaman
A1	PSP Padang	7	2	9
B2	Kompak Kampung Pisang	1	0	1
(SF2) 29 & 31 March 2026 — SUSB, Padang Pariaman
B1	PSPP Padang Panjang	1	1	2
A2	PSLA Sicincin	1	0	1

Final
02 April 2026 — SUSB, Padang Pariaman
WSF1	PSP Padang	3
WSF2	PSPP Padang Panjang	2
Third place play-off
02 April 2026 — SUSB, Padang Pariaman
LSF1	Kompak Kampung Pisang	1
LSF1	PSLA Sicincin	6

=== Knockout match ===
==== Semi-Finals ====
The semi-finals were contested over two legs on 29 and 31 March 2026 at the West Sumatra Main Stadium.

First leg (29 March 2026)
29 March 2026
13:30 (UTC+07:00)

Kompak Kampung Pisang	1–7	PSP Padang

West Sumatra Main Stadium, Padang Pariaman Regency
29 March 2026
15:30 (UTC+07:00)

PSLA Sicincin	1–1	PSPP Padang Panjang

West Sumatra Main Stadium, Padang Pariaman Regency

Second leg (31 March 2026)
31 March 2026
13:30 (UTC+07:00)

PSPP Padang Panjang	1–0	PSLA Sicincin
	Report

West Sumatra Main Stadium, Padang Pariaman Regency
31 March 2026
15:30 (UTC+07:00)

PSP Padang	2–0	Kompak Kampung Pisang

West Sumatra Main Stadium, Padang Pariaman Regency

==== Third-place play-off ====
The two losing teams from the semi-finals competed for the third-place position.

Third-place (2 April 2026)
2 April 2026
13:30 (UTC+07:00)

Kompak Kampung Pisang	1–6	PSLA Sicincin
	Report

West Sumatra Main Stadium, Padang Pariaman Regency

==== Final ====
The winners of the semi-finals advanced to the final to determine the provincial champion and the representative for the national phase.

Final (2 April 2026)
2 April 2026
15:30 (UTC+07:00)

PSP Padang	3–2	PSPP Padang Panjang
	Report

Haji Agus Salim Stadium, Padang

== See also ==
- 2025–26 Liga 4
