= PSPP Padang Panjang =

Indonesian football club

PSPP
- Full name: Persatuan Sepakbola Padang Panjang
- Nickname: Tim Serambi Mekah
- Short name: PSPP
- Founded: 1971; 55 years ago
- Ground: Chatib Sulaiman Stadium; Padang Panjang, West Sumatra
- Capacity: 5,000
- Owner: Padang Panjang Government
- Chairman: Fadly Amran
- Manager: Irsyad Hanif
- Coach: Dian Rama Saputra
- League: Liga 4
- 2025–26: 2nd (West Sumatra zone); First round, 3rd in Group D (National phase)
Home colours	Away colours

Persatuan Sepakbola Padang Panjang, commonly known as PSPP, is an Indonesian football club based in Padang Panjang, West Sumatra. This club played in Liga 4 West Sumatra zone.

== History ==
Persatuan Sepakbola Padang Panjang or PSPP was founded in 1971. During the 2005 Liga Indonesia Second Division season, they managed to qualify for 2006 Liga Indonesia First Division season. At that time the PSSI competition pyramid consisted of the Premier Division, First Division, Second Division, and Third Division.

After that, various changes in the strata of national competitions in Indonesia meant that PSPP had to start again from the lower division. In the 2023–24 Liga 3 West Sumatra, they appeared as the runner-up of the competition and was entitled to the national round. But their steps were immediately stopped in the preliminary round (round of 80).

== Players ==
As of April 2024

Note: Flags indicate national team as defined under FIFA eligibility rules; some limited exceptions apply. Players may hold more than one non-FIFA nationality.

No.	Pos.	Nation	Player
—	GK	IDN	Dedi Kurniawan
—	GK	IDN	Nanda Saputra
—	GK	IDN	Fajrul Izhar
—	DF	IDN	Teddy Hendry
—	DF	IDN	Dimas Adi Putra
—	DF	IDN	Harfiansyah
—	DF	IDN	Aayup Saputra
—	DF	IDN	Ahmad Hawari
—	DF	IDN	Muhammad Latif Habibullah
—	MF	IDN	Rivaldo
—	MF	IDN	Arie Putra Polensky

No.	Pos.	Nation	Player
—	MF	IDN	Rudi
—	MF	IDN	Feruzen Maulana
—	MF	IDN	Aidil Pura
—	MF	IDN	Muhammad Yazif
—	MF	IDN	Defrian Zuandra
—	MF	IDN	Devri Perdana Darmansyah
—	FW	IDN	Rantos Aprianda
—	FW	IDN	Kevin Ivander
—	FW	IDN	Reva Wirya Ilham
—	FW	IDN	Robyo Candra
—	FW	IDN	Robi Aprilio

== Honours ==
- Liga 3 West Sumatra
  - Runner-up (1): 2023–24
- Liga 4 West Sumatra
  - Runners-up (2): 2024–25, 2025–26
