= Wahana F.C. =

Wahana
- Full name: Wahana Football Club
- Nickname: Tim Dakwah
- Founded: 2020; 6 years ago
- Ground: Wahana Football Field
- Owner: PT Wahanakarsa Swandiri
- Chairman: Aryo Triyoga
- Manager: Riko Amri
- Coach: Agus Rianto
- League: Liga 4
- 2024–25: 1st (Riau Zone); First round, 3rd in Group E (National phase)
Home colours	Away colours

Wahana Football Club is an Indonesian football club based in Pekanbaru, Riau. They currently compete in the Liga 4 Riau zone and their homebase is Wahana Football Field.

== Honours ==
- Liga 4 Riau
  - Champions (2): 2024–25, 2025–26
