= PSP Padang =

Association football team in Indonesia

- Full name: Persatuan Sepakbola Padang
- Nickname: Pandeka Minang (Minang Warriors)
- Short name: PSP
- Founded: 1928; 98 years ago
- Ground: Gelora Haji Agus Salim Stadium
- Capacity: 20,000
- Owner: Askot PSSI Padang
- Chairman: Hendri Septa
- Manager: Irwan Afriadi
- Coach: Delfriadi
- League: Liga 4
- 2023–24: Semi-finals, (West Sumatera zone)
Home colours	Away colours

Persatuan Sepakbola Padang (simply known as PSP Padang) is an Indonesian football club based in Padang, West Sumatra. They currently compete in the Liga 4 and their homeground is Gelora Haji Agus Salim Stadium.

== History ==
PSP Padang was established in 1928 as Sport Vereniging Minang (SVM), under the Padang football organization. Club later known as Ilans Padang Electal (IPE) became the forerunner to the establishment of PSP Padang.

However, the existence of IPE did not last long, because the Dutch Colonial Government changed it by forming a Padang football organization in 1935 with the name Voetballbond Padang En Omstreken, chaired by Meneer Vander Lee.

Along with domestic political turmoil, in 1942 the Netherlands handed over its power to Japan. The initiative to change the name of the VPO to PSP (Persatuan Sepak Bola Padang) was started, and Yusuf St. Mantari became the first chairman under the new name.

=== Kejurnas PSSI (PSSI National Championship) era ===
The official national football competition began under the PSSI in 1951. With the holding of two rounds, the competition existed at the district and the national level.

They appeared for the first time at the 1957 PSSI National Championship. In the first qualifying round, Zone A was inhabited by PSS (Pematangsiantar-East Sumatra) and PS Palembang (South Sumatera). PSP came out as the winner of zone A after winning 6–0 over PSS and 5–0 over PS Palembang. In the second qualifying round, PSP joined Persib Bandung and Persis Solo, again showing its superiority in a 3–1 win against Persib, followed by a 4–4 draw against Persis Solo.

At the national level, they were ranked 5th with 4 points from the results of one win (5–1 against Persebaya Surabaya), two draws (1–1 against Persija Jakarta and Persema Malang), and three defeats (against PSMS Medan, Persib Bandung, and PSM Makassar). The goalkeeper Yus Etek was called up for the Indonesia national team.

== Season-by-season records ==
Season	League/Division	Tms.	Pos.	Piala Indonesia
1994–95	First Division	16	First round	–
1995–96	First Division	24	1	–
1996–97	Premier Division	33	5th, Central division	–
1997–98	Premier Division	31	did not finish	–
1998–99	Premier Division	28	5th, Group A	–
1999–2000	Premier Division	28	12th, West division	–
2001	Premier Division	28	13th, West division	–
2002	First Division	27	7th, Group 4	–
2003	Second Division	28	5th, Group A	–
2004	Second Division	41	4th, Group B	–
2005	Second Division	24	3	First round
2006	First Division	36	3rd, Group 1	Second round
2007	First Division	40	Semi-final	Qualifying round
2008–09	Premier Division	29	15th, Group 1	–
2009–10	First Division	60	withdrew	–
2010	First Division	57	4th, Second round	–
2011–12	Premier Division (LPIS)	28	9th, Group 1	First round
2013	First Division	77	First round	–
2014	First Division	73	3rd, Third round	–
2015	Liga Nusantara	season abandoned		–
2016	ISC Liga Nusantara	32		–
2017	Liga 3	32	Eliminated in Provincial round	–
2018	Liga 3	32	Eliminated in Provincial round	–
2019	Liga 3	32	Eliminated in Regional round	–
2020	Liga 3	season abandoned		–
2021–22	Liga 3	64	Eliminated in Provincial round	–
2022–23	Liga 3	season abandoned		–
2023–24	Liga 3	32	Eliminated in Provincial round	–

== Results against foreign teams ==
- FC Salzburg (drew 2–2)
- Mozambique national football team (won 5–2)
- Columbus from Africa (won 3–1)
- FC Lokomotiv Moscow (lost 0–7)
- Bulgaria national football team (lost 1–6)
- Red Star Belgrade (lost 1–2 and 3–5)
- São Paulo FC (lost 1–2)
- Middlesex Wanderers (lost 1–5)
- North Korea (lost 0–2)
- Kelang Selangor (won 6–3)
- Downstream Silver (won 3–1)
- Seremban (won 3–1)

=== Abroad matches ===
- Indo Malay (drew 1–1) in Malaysia, 1976
- Kuala Langsat (lost 3–5)

== Name changes ==
- IPE (Illans Padang Electal) 1928–1935 (part of the SVM, Sport Vereniging Minangkabau/Minangkabau Sports Association)
- VPO (Voetballbond Padang en Omstreken) 1935–1942
- PSP (Padang Football Association) 1942–present

== Honours ==
- Liga Indonesia First Division
  - Champions: 1996
- Liga 3 West Sumatra
  - Champions: 2019
- Liga 4 West Sumatra
  - Champions: 2025–26
