= 2025–26 Liga 4 East Nusa Tenggara =

Liga 4 East Nusa Tenggara
- Season: 2025–26
- Dates: 8 November – 5 December 2025
- Champions: PSN Ngada (1st Liga 4 East Nusa Tenggara title) (9th ETMC title)
- Runner up: Persena Nagekeo
- National phase: PSN Ngada; Persena Nagekeo; Persada Southwest Sumba

The 2025–26 Liga 4 East Nusa Tenggara (also known as Liga 4 El Tari Memorial Cup XXXIV 2025–26 or simply Liga 4 ETMC XXXIV 2025–26) was the 34th season of the El Tari Memorial Cup and the second season as Liga 4 East Nusa Tenggara after the structural changes of Indonesian football competition and serves as a qualifying round for the national phase of the 2025–26 Liga 4.

The competition is organised by the East Nusa Tenggara Provincial PSSI Association.

== Teams ==
=== Teams changes ===
The following teams changed division after the 2024–25 season.

▲ Promoted to Liga Nusantara
- Persebata Lembata

=== Participating teams ===
A total of 28 teams are competing in this season.

No	Team	Location	2024–25 season
1	Bajak Laut	West Manggarai Regency	Quarter-finalist
2	Persamba	West Manggarai Regency	Quarter-finalist
3	Persim Manggarai	Manggarai Regency	—
4	Persematim	East Manggarai Regency	Round of 16
5	Tiara Nusa	East Manggarai Regency	Quarter-finalist
6	Citra Bakti	Ngada Regency	Round of 16
7	PSN	Ngada Regency	Round of 16
8	Nirwana 04 Nagekeo	Nagekeo Regency	Group stage (3rd in Group B)
9	Persena	Nagekeo Regency	Group stage (3rd in Group C)
10	Flores United	Ende Regency	Group stage (4th in Group C)
11	Perse	Ende Regency	Fourth place
12	Persami	Sikka Regency	Quarter-finalist
13	Biru Muda Perkasa	East Flores Regency	Round of 16
14	Perseftim	East Flores Regency	Third place
15	BMU Alor Pantar	Alor Regency	Group stage (3rd in Group D)
16	Persap	Alor Regency	Group stage (3rd in Group G)

No	Team	Location	2024–25 season
17	Persada	Southwest Sumba Regency	Round of 16
18	Persewa	East Sumba Regency	Group stage (4th in Group H)
19	Perserond	Rote Ndao Regency	Group stage (3rd in Group H)
20	Kristal	Kupang City	Group stage (3rd in Group A)
21	Persekota	Kupang City	Round of 16
22	Platina	Kupang City	Group stage (4th in Group E)
23	Putera Oesao	Kupang City	Group stage (4th in Group F)
24	Perss	South Central Timor Regency	Group stage (4th in Group B)
25	PS Malaka	Malaka Regency	Round of 16
26	Sergio	Malaka Regency	Group stage (4th in Group D)
27	Bintang Timur Atambua	Belu Regency	Champions
28	Persab Belu	Belu Regency	Group stage (3rd in Group E)

== Group stage ==
The draw for the first round took place on 8 November 2025 in Kupang. The 28 teams will be drawn into 7 groups of four. The group stage will be played in a home tournament format of single round-robin matches.

The top two teams of each group along with two best third place teams will qualify for the knockout stage.

=== Group A ===
All matches will be held at Marilonga Stadium, Ende.

Pos	Team	Pld	W	D	L	GF	GA	GD	Pts	Qualification
1	Citra Bakti Ngada	3	2	1	0	7	3	+4	7	Qualification to the knockout stage
2	Perse Ende (H)	3	2	0	1	5	3	+2	6	Qualification to the knockout stage
3	BMU Alor Pantar	3	1	0	2	3	6	−3	3	
4	Sergio	3	0	1	2	3	6	−3	1	

Source: Liga 4 East Nusa Tenggara
Rules for classification: 1) Points; 2) Head-to-head points; 3) Head-to-head goal difference; 4) Head-to-head goals scored; 5) Goal difference; 6) Goals scored; 7) Fair-play points; 8) Draw.
(H) Hosts

=== Group B ===
All matches will be held at Marilonga Stadium, Ende.

Pos	Team	Pld	W	D	L	GF	GA	GD	Pts	Qualification
1	PSN Ngada	3	3	0	0	6	1	+5	9	Qualification to the knockout stage
2	Persekota Koepang	3	1	1	1	1	2	−1	4	Qualification to the knockout stage
3	Perseftim East Flores	3	1	0	2	2	3	−1	3	
4	Persim Manggarai	3	0	1	2	0	3	−3	1	

Source: Liga 4 East Nusa Tenggara
Rules for classification: 1) Points; 2) Head-to-head points; 3) Head-to-head goal difference; 4) Head-to-head goals scored; 5) Goal difference; 6) Goals scored; 7) Fair-play points; 8) Draw.

=== Group C ===
All matches will be held at Marilonga Stadium, Ende.

Pos	Team	Pld	W	D	L	GF	GA	GD	Pts	Qualification
1	Biru Muda Perkasa	3	2	1	0	6	1	+5	7	Qualification to the knockout stage
2	Flores United	3	0	3	0	1	1	0	3	Qualification to the knockout stage
3	Persami Maumere	3	0	2	1	4	6	−2	2	
4	Platina	3	0	2	1	4	7	−3	2	

Source: Liga 4 East Nusa Tenggara
Rules for classification: 1) Points; 2) Head-to-head points; 3) Head-to-head goal difference; 4) Head-to-head goals scored; 5) Goal difference; 6) Goals scored; 7) Fair-play points; 8) Draw.

=== Group D ===
All matches will be held at Marilonga Stadium, Ende.

Pos	Team	Pld	W	D	L	GF	GA	GD	Pts	Qualification
1	Bajak Laut	3	2	0	1	4	2	+2	6	Qualification to the knockout stage
2	Persematim East Manggarai	3	2	0	1	4	2	+2	6	Qualification to the knockout stage
3	Persab Belu	3	2	0	1	3	3	0	6	Qualification to the knockout stage
4	Tiara Nusa	3	0	0	3	2	6	−4	0	

Source: Liga 4 East Nusa Tenggara
Rules for classification: 1) Points; 2) Head-to-head points; 3) Head-to-head goal difference; 4) Head-to-head goals scored; 5) Goal difference; 6) Goals scored; 7) Fair-play points; 8) Draw.

=== Group E ===
All matches will be held at Marilonga Stadium, Ende.

Pos	Team	Pld	W	D	L	GF	GA	GD	Pts	Qualification
1	Persap Alor	3	1	2	0	4	2	+2	5	Qualification to the knockout stage
2	Perss Soe	3	1	2	0	1	0	+1	5	Qualification to the knockout stage
3	PS Kab. Kupang	3	1	0	2	3	4	−1	3	
4	Perserond Rote Ndao	3	0	2	1	1	3	−2	2	

Source: Liga 4 East Nusa Tenggara
Rules for classification: 1) Points; 2) Head-to-head points; 3) Head-to-head goal difference; 4) Head-to-head goals scored; 5) Goal difference; 6) Goals scored; 7) Fair-play points; 8) Draw.

=== Group F ===
All matches will be held at Marilonga Stadium, Ende.

Pos	Team	Pld	W	D	L	GF	GA	GD	Pts	Qualification
1	Persamba West Manggarai	3	3	0	0	6	2	+4	9	Qualification to the knockout stage
2	PS Malaka	3	1	1	1	6	5	+1	4	Qualification to the knockout stage
3	Persewa Waingapu	3	1	0	2	5	6	−1	3	
4	Bintang Timur Atambua	3	0	1	2	3	7	−4	1	

Source: Liga 4 East Nusa Tenggara
Rules for classification: 1) Points; 2) Head-to-head points; 3) Head-to-head goal difference; 4) Head-to-head goals scored; 5) Goal difference; 6) Goals scored; 7) Fair-play points; 8) Draw.

=== Group G ===
All matches will be held at Marilonga Stadium, Ende.

Pos	Team	Pld	W	D	L	GF	GA	GD	Pts	Qualification
1	Persena Nagekeo	3	2	1	0	5	3	+2	7	Qualification to the knockout stage
2	Kristal	3	1	1	1	3	2	+1	4	Qualification to the knockout stage
3	Persada Southwest Sumba	3	1	1	1	2	3	−1	4	Qualification to the knockout stage
4	Nirwana 04	3	0	1	2	3	5	−2	1	

Source: Liga 4 East Nusa Tenggara
Rules for classification: 1) Points; 2) Head-to-head points; 3) Head-to-head goal difference; 4) Head-to-head goals scored; 5) Goal difference; 6) Goals scored; 7) Fair-play points; 8) Draw.

=== Ranking of third placed teams ===
Pos	Grp	Team	Pld	W	D	L	GF	GA	GD	Pts	Qualification
1	D	Persab Belu	3	2	0	1	3	3	0	6	Qualification to the Knockout stage
2	G	Persada Southwest Sumba	3	1	1	1	2	3	−1	4	Qualification to the Knockout stage
3	F	Persewa Waingapu	3	1	0	2	5	6	−1	3	
4	E	PS Kab. Kupang	3	1	0	2	3	4	−1	3	
5	B	Perseftim East Flores	3	1	0	2	2	3	−1	3	
6	A	BMU Alor Pantar	3	1	0	2	3	6	−3	3	
7	C	Persami Maumere	3	0	2	1	4	6	−2	2	

Source: Liga 4 East Nusa Tenggara
Rules for classification: Rules for classification: 1) Points; 2) Goal difference; 3) Goals scored ; 4) Fair-play points; 5) Draw.

== Knockout stage ==
The knockout stage will be played as a single match. If tied after regulation time, extra time and, if necessary, a penalty shoot-out will be used to decide the winning team. The top three teams will qualify to the national phase.

Round of 16
A1	Citra Bakti Ngada	0
D3	Persab Belu	1
B1	PSN Ngada	1
E2	Perss SoE	0
C1	Biru Muda Perkasa	1 (3)
F2	PS Malaka	1 (5)
D1	Bajak Laut	2
G2	Kristal	1
E1	Persap Alor	1 (2)
G3	Persada Southwest Sumba	1 (4)
F1	Persamba West Manggarai	1 (3)
B2	Persekota Koepang	1 (4)
G1	Persena Nagekeo	1 (5)
C2	Flores United	1 (4)
A2	Perse Ende	3
D2	Persematim East Manggarai	0

Quarter-finals
Persab Belu	0
PSN Ngada	1
PS Malaka	4
Bajak Laut	6
Persada Southwest Sumba	2 (5)
Persekota Koepang	2 (3)
Persena Nagekeo	1
Perse Ende	0

Semi-finals
PSN Ngada	1 (4)
Bajak Laut	1 (3)
Persada Southwest Sumba	0
Persena Nagekeo	1

Final
PSN Ngada	2
Persena Nagekeo	0
Third place play-off
Bajak Laut	1
Persada Southwest Sumba	0

=== Round of 16 ===
24 November 2025
16:00 WITA (UTC+8)

Citra Bakti Ngada	0–1	Persab Belu

Marilonga Stadium, Ende

24 November 2025
20:00 WITA (UTC+8)

PSN Ngada	1–0	Perss SoE

Marilonga Stadium, Ende

25 November 2025
16:00 WITA (UTC+8)

Biru Muda Perkasa	1–1	PS Malaka
Penalties
	3–5

Marilonga Stadium, Ende

25 November 2025
20:00 WITA (UTC+8)

Bajak Laut	2–1	Kristal

Marilonga Stadium, Ende

26 November 2025
16:00 WITA (UTC+8)

Persap Alor	1–1	Persada Southwest Sumba
Penalties
	2–4

Marilonga Stadium, Ende

26 November 2025
20:00 WITA (UTC+8)

Persamba West Manggarai	1–1	Persekota Koepang
Penalties
	3–4

Marilonga Stadium, Ende

27 November 2025
16:00 WITA (UTC+8)

Persena Nagekeo	1–1	Flores United
Penalties
	5–4

Marilonga Stadium, Ende

27 November 2025
20:00 WITA (UTC+8)

Perse Ende	3–0	Persematim East Manggarai

Marilonga Stadium, Ende

=== Quarter-finals ===
30 November 2025
16:00 WITA (UTC+8)

Persab Belu	0–1	PSN Ngada

Marilonga Stadium, Ende

30 November 2025
20:00 WITA (UTC+8)

PS Malaka	4–6	Bajak Laut

Marilonga Stadium, Ende

1 December 2025
16:00 WITA (UTC+8)

Persada Southwest Sumba	2–2	Persekota Koepang
Penalties
	5–3

Marilonga Stadium, Ende

1 December 2025
20:00 WITA (UTC+8)

Persena Nagekeo	1–0	Perse Ende

Marilonga Stadium, Ende

=== Semi-finals ===
3 December 2025
16:00 WITA (UTC+8)

PSN Ngada	1–1	Bajak Laut
Penalties
	4–3

Marilonga Stadium, Ende

3 December 2025
20:00 WITA (UTC+8)

Persada Southwest Sumba	0–1	Persena Nagekeo

Marilonga Stadium, Ende

=== Third place play-off ===
5 December 2025
16:00 WITA (UTC+8)

Bajak Laut	1–0	Persada Southwest Sumba

Marilonga Stadium, Ende

=== Final ===
5 December 2025
20:00 WITA (UTC+8)

PSN Ngada	2–0	Persena Nagekeo

Marilonga Stadium, Ende

== See also ==
- 2025–26 Liga 4
