= 2024–25 Liga 4 East Nusa Tenggara =

Liga 4 East Nusa Tenggara
- Season: 2024–25
- Dates: 3–24 March 2025
- Champions: Bintang Timur Atambua; 1st Liga 4 East Nusa Tenggara title 1st ETMC title
- National phase: Bintang Timur Atambua; Persebata; Perseftim
- Matches: 61
- Goals: 163 (2.67 per match)
- Biggest win: Tiara Nusa 6–1 Persena (12 March 2025)
- Highest scoring: Tiara Nusa 6–1 Persena (12 March 2025)
- Longest winning run: 6 games Bintang Timur Atambua
- Longest unbeaten run: 7 games Bintang Timur Atambua
- Longest winless run: 3 games Flores United; Persewa; Putra Oesao
- Longest losing run: 3 games Flores United; Persewa; Putra Oesao

The 2024–25 Liga 4 East Nusa Tenggara (also known as Liga 4 El Tari Memorial Cup XXXIII 2024–25 or simply Liga 4 ETMC XXXIII 2024–25) was the 33rd season of the El Tari Memorial Cup and the inaugural season as Liga 4 East Nusa Tenggara after the structural changes of Indonesian football competition and serves as a qualifying round for the national phase of the 2024–25 Liga 4. The competition is organised by the East Nusa Tenggara Provincial PSSI Association.

== Teams ==
=== Participating teams ===
A total of 32 teams were set to compete this season, but Persim Manggarai withdrew before their first match, reducing the number to 31.

No	Team	Location	2023 season
1	Bajak Laut	West Manggarai Regency	—
2	Persamba	West Manggarai Regency	Group Stage (4th in Group E)
3	~~Persim Manggarai~~	Manggarai Regency	Quarter-finalist
4	Persematim	East Manggarai Regency	Round of 16
5	Tiara Nusa	East Manggarai Regency	—
6	Citra Bakti	Ngada Regency	—
7	PSN	Ngada Regency	Champions
8	Nirwana 04 Nagekeo	Nagekeo Regency	Group Stage (3rd in Group E)
9	Persena	Nagekeo Regency	Group Stage (4th in Group A)
10	Flores United	Ende Regency	—
11	Perse	Ende Regency	Round of 16
12	Persami	Sikka Regency	Round of 16
13	Biru Muda Perkasa	East Flores Regency	Fourth-place
14	Perseftim	East Flores Regency	Quarter-finalist
15	Persebata	Lembata Regency	Quarter-finalist
16	BMU Alor Pantar	Alor Regency	Quarter-finalist
17	Persap	Alor Regency	Round of 16
18	Persada	Southwest Sumba Regency	—

No	Team	Location	2023 season
19	Persewa	East Sumba Regency	Round of 16
20	Persarai	Sabu Raijua Regency	Group Stage (4th in Group C)
21	Perserond	Rote Ndao Regency	Third-place
22	Kristal	Kupang City	Group Stage (3rd in Group C)
23	Persekota	Kupang City	Round of 16
24	Platina	Kupang City	Group Stage (4th in Group B)
25	Putera Oesao	Kupang City	Group Stage (4th in Group D)
26	PSK Kupang	Kupang Regency	Round of 16
27	Perss	South Central Timor Regency	Round of 16
28	PSKN	North Central Timor Regency	Group Stage (3rd in Group B)
29	PS Malaka	Malaka Regency	Group Stage (3rd in Group D)
30	Sergio	Malaka Regency	—
31	Bintang Timur Atambua	Belu Regency	Runner-up
32	Persab Belu	Belu Regency	Group Stage (3rd in Group G)

== Schedule ==
The schedule of the competition is as follows.

Stage	Matchday	Date
Group stage	Matchday 1	3–7 March 2025
Group stage	Matchday 2	7–11 March 2025
Group stage	Matchday 3	11–15 March 2025
Knockout stage	Round of 16	16–17 March 2025
Knockout stage	Quarter-finals	18–19 March 2025
Knockout stage	Semi-finals	21 March 2025
Knockout stage	Third place play-off	23 March 2025
Knockout stage	Final	24 March 2025

== Group stage ==
The draw for the first round took place on 1 March 2025 in Kupang. The 32 teams will be drawn into 8 groups of four. The group stage will be played in a home tournament format of single round-robin matches..

The top two teams of each group will qualify for the knockout stage.

=== Group A ===
All matches will be held at Oepoi Stadium, Kupang.

Pos	Team	Pld	W	D	L	GF	GA	GD	Pts	Qualification	PMB	PMT	KRS	PSR
1	Persamba	3	1	2	0	3	2	+1	5	Qualification to the knockout stage		1–1		
2	Persematim	3	1	1	1	4	3	+1	4 (Note: Ranked on head-to-head points: Persematim 3, Kristal 0.)	Qualification to the knockout stage			3–1	0–1
3	Kristal	3	1	1	1	5	5	0	4		1–1			3–1
4	Persarai	3	1	0	2	2	4	−2	3		0–1			

Source: Liga 4 East Nusa Tenggara
Legend: Blue = home team win; Yellow = draw; Red = away team win.
Rules for classification: 1) Points; 2) Head-to-head points; 3) Head-to-head goal difference; 4) Head-to-head goals scored; 5) Goal difference; 6) Goals scored; 7) Fair-play points; 8) Draw.
Notes:

Group A Matches

Matchday 1 (5 March)
5 March 2025
19:10 WITA (UTC+8)

Persematim	0–1	Persarai
	Report

Oepoi Stadium, Kupang
5 March 2025
21:20 WITA (UTC+8)

Kristal	1–1	Persamba
	Report

Oepoi Stadium, Kupang

Matchday 2 (9 March)
9 March 2025
15:00 WITA (UTC+8)

Persamba	1–1	Persematim
	Report

Oepoi Stadium, Kupang
9 March 2025
17:10 WITA (UTC+8)

Kristal	3–1	Persarai
	Report

Oepoi Stadium, Kupang

Matchday 3 (13 March)
13 March 2025
19:10 WITA (UTC+8)

Persematim	3–1	Kristal
	Report

Oepoi Stadium, Kupang
13 March 2025
21:20 WITA (UTC+8)

Persarai	0–1	Persamba
	Report

Oepoi Stadium, Kupang

=== Group B ===
All matches will be held at Oepoi Stadium, Kupang.

Pos	Team	Pld	W	D	L	GF	GA	GD	Pts	Qualification	PSN	PKN	NRW	PRS
1	PSN	3	2	1	0	8	2	+6	7	Qualification to the knockout stage		2–2		3–0
2	PSKN	3	1	1	1	5	5	0	4	Qualification to the knockout stage			2–1	1–2
3	Nirwana 04 Nagekeo	3	1	0	2	3	6	−3	3 (Note: Ranked on head-to-head points: Nirwana 04 Nagekeo 3, Perss 0.)		0–3			
4	Perss	3	1	0	2	3	6	−3	3				1–2	

Source: Liga 4 East Nusa Tenggara
Legend: Blue = home team win; Yellow = draw; Red = away team win.
Rules for classification: 1) Points; 2) Head-to-head points; 3) Head-to-head goal difference; 4) Head-to-head goals scored; 5) Goal difference; 6) Goals scored; 7) Fair-play points; 8) Draw.
Notes:

Group B Matches

Matchday 1 (3 March)
3 March 2025
19:00 WITA (UTC+8)

PSN	3–0	Perss
	Report

Oepoi Stadium, Kupang
3 March 2025
21:10 WITA (UTC+8)

PSKN	2–1	Nirwana 04 Nagekeo
	Report

Oepoi Stadium, Kupang

Matchday 2 (7 March)
7 March 2025
15:00 WITA (UTC+8)

Nirwana 04 Nagekeo	0–3	PSN
	Report

Oepoi Stadium, Kupang
7 March 2025
17:10 WITA (UTC+8)

PSKN	1–2	Perss
	Report

Oepoi Stadium, Kupang

Matchday 3 (11 March)
11 March 2025
15:00 WITA (UTC+8)

PSN	2–2	PSKN
	Report

Oepoi Stadium, Kupang
11 March 2025
17:10 WITA (UTC+8)

Perss	1–2	Nirwana 04 Nagekeo
	Report

Oepoi Stadium, Kupang

=== Group C ===
All matches will be held at Oepoi Stadium, Kupang.

Pos	Team	Pld	W	D	L	GF	GA	GD	Pts	Qualification	TNA	PDA	PNA	FLU
1	Tiara Nusa	3	2	1	0	8	1	+7	7	Qualification to the knockout stage			6–1	
2	Persada	3	1	2	0	3	2	+1	5	Qualification to the knockout stage	0–0			
3	Persena	3	1	1	1	4	8	−4	4			1–1		2–1
4	Flores United	3	0	0	3	2	6	−4	0		0–2	1–2		

Source: Liga 4 East Nusa Tenggara
Legend: Blue = home team win; Yellow = draw; Red = away team win.
Rules for classification: 1) Points; 2) Head-to-head points; 3) Head-to-head goal difference; 4) Head-to-head goals scored; 5) Goal difference; 6) Goals scored; 7) Fair-play points; 8) Draw.

Group C Matches

Matchday 1 (4 March)
4 March 2025
15:00 WITA (UTC+8)

Flores United	0–2	Tiara Nusa
	Report

Oepoi Stadium, Kupang
4 March 2025
17:10 WITA (UTC+8)

Persena	1–1	Persada
	Report

Oepoi Stadium, Kupang

Matchday 2 (8 March)
8 March 2025
19:10 WITA (UTC+8)

Persada	0–0	Tiara Nusa
	Report

Oepoi Stadium, Kupang
8 March 2025
21:20 WITA (UTC+8)

Persena	2–1	Flores United
	Report

Oepoi Stadium, Kupang

Matchday 3 (12 March)
12 March 2025
15:00 WITA (UTC+8)

Flores United	1–2	Persada
	Report

Oepoi Stadium, Kupang
12 March 2025
17:10 WITA (UTC+8)

Tiara Nusa	6–1	Persena
	Report

Oepoi Stadium, Kupang

=== Group D ===
All matches will be held at Oepoi Stadium, Kupang.

Pos	Team	Pld	W	D	L	GF	GA	GD	Pts	Qualification	BTM	PSE	BMU	SER
1	Bintang Timur Atambua	3	3	0	0	6	2	+4	9	Qualification to the knockout stage		3–1		2–1
2	Perse	3	2	0	1	6	6	0	6	Qualification to the knockout stage			3–2	
3	BMU Alor Pantar	3	0	1	2	2	4	−2	1		0–1			
4	Sergio	3	0	1	2	2	4	−2	1			1–2	0–0	

Source: Liga 4 East Nusa Tenggara
Legend: Blue = home team win; Yellow = draw; Red = away team win.
Rules for classification: 1) Points; 2) Head-to-head points; 3) Head-to-head goal difference; 4) Head-to-head goals scored; 5) Goal difference; 6) Goals scored; 7) Fair-play points; 8) Draw.

Group D Matches

Matchday 1 (4 March)
4 March 2025
19:10 WITA (UTC+8)

Sergio	0–0	BMU Alor Pantar
	Report

Oepoi Stadium, Kupang
4 March 2025
21:20 WITA (UTC+8)

Bintang Timur Atambua	3–1	Perse
	Report

Oepoi Stadium, Kupang

Matchday 2 (8 March)
8 March 2025
15:00 WITA (UTC+8)

Perse	3–2	BMU Alor Pantar
	Report

Oepoi Stadium, Kupang
8 March 2025
17:10 WITA (UTC+8)

Bintang Timur Atambua	2–1	Sergio
	Report

Oepoi Stadium, Kupang

Matchday 3 (12 March)
12 March 2025
19:10 WITA (UTC+8)

Sergio	1–2	Perse
	Report

Oepoi Stadium, Kupang
12 March 2025
21:20 WITA (UTC+8)

BMU Alor Pantar	0–1	Bintang Timur Atambua
	Report

Oepoi Stadium, Kupang

=== Group E ===
All matches will be held at Oepoi Stadium, Kupang.

Pos	Team	Pld	W	D	L	GF	GA	GD	Pts	Qualification	PBT	BJL	PAB	PLA
1	Persebata	3	2	1	0	7	1	+6	7	Qualification to the knockout stage		1–1		4–0
2	Bajak Laut	3	1	2	0	4	3	+1	5	Qualification to the knockout stage			1–1	2–1
3	Persab Belu	3	0	2	1	2	4	−2	2		0–2			
4	Platina	3	0	1	2	2	7	−5	1				1–1	

Source: Liga 4 East Nusa Tenggara
Legend: Blue = home team win; Yellow = draw; Red = away team win.
Rules for classification: 1) Points; 2) Head-to-head points; 3) Head-to-head goal difference; 4) Head-to-head goals scored; 5) Goal difference; 6) Goals scored; 7) Fair-play points; 8) Draw.

Group E Matches

Matchday 1 (5 March)
5 March 2025
15:00 WITA (UTC+8)

Bajak Laut	1–1	Persab Belu
	Report

Oepoi Stadium, Kupang
5 March 2025
17:10 WITA (UTC+8)

Persebata	4–0	Platina
	Report

Oepoi Stadium, Kupang

Matchday 2 (9 March)
9 March 2025
19:10 WITA (UTC+8)

Platina	1–1	Persab Belu
	Report

Oepoi Stadium, Kupang
9 March 2025
21:20 WITA (UTC+8)

Persebata	1–1	Bajak Laut
	Report

Oepoi Stadium, Kupang

Matchday 3 (13 March)
13 March 2025
15:00 WITA (UTC+8)

Bajak Laut	2–1	Platina
	Report

Oepoi Stadium, Kupang
13 March 2025
17:10 WITA (UTC+8)

Persab Belu	0–2	Persebata
	Report

Oepoi Stadium, Kupang

=== Group F ===
All matches will be held at Oepoi Stadium, Kupang.

Pos	Team	Pld	W	D	L	GF	GA	GD	Pts	Qualification	PMI	CTR	PSK	PTR
1	Persami	3	3	0	0	6	0	+6	9	Qualification to the knockout stage			1–0	
2	Citra Bakti	3	2	0	1	6	2	+4	6	Qualification to the knockout stage	0–1		4–0	
3	PSK Kupang	3	1	0	2	3	6	−3	3					3–1
4	Putra Oesao	3	0	0	3	2	9	−7	0		0–4	1–2		

Source: Liga 4 East Nusa Tenggara
Legend: Blue = home team win; Yellow = draw; Red = away team win.
Rules for classification: 1) Points; 2) Head-to-head points; 3) Head-to-head goal difference; 4) Head-to-head goals scored; 5) Goal difference; 6) Goals scored; 7) Fair-play points; 8) Draw.

Group F Matches

Matchday 1 (6 March)
6 March 2025
15:00 WITA (UTC+8)

Putra Oesao	0–4	Persami
	Report

Oepoi Stadium, Kupang
6 March 2025
17:10 WITA (UTC+8)

Citra Bakti	4–0	PSK Kupang
	Report

Oepoi Stadium, Kupang

Matchday 2 (10 March)
10 March 2025
19:10 WITA (UTC+8)

PSK Kupang	3–1	Putra Oesao
	Report

Oepoi Stadium, Kupang
10 March 2025
21:20 WITA (UTC+8)

Citra Bakti	0–1	Persami
	Report

Oepoi Stadium, Kupang

Matchday 3 (14 March)
14 March 2025
15:00 WITA (UTC+8)

Putra Oesao	1–2	Citra Bakti
	Report

Oepoi Stadium, Kupang
14 March 2025
17:10 WITA (UTC+8)

Persami	1–0	PSK Kupang
	Report

Oepoi Stadium, Kupang

=== Group G ===
All matches will be held at Oepoi Stadium, Kupang.

Pos	Team	Pld	W	D	L	GF	GA	GD	Pts	Qualification	KOT	MAL	SAP	SIM
1	Persekota (H)	2	1	1	0	3	2	+1	4	Qualification to the knockout stage		1–1		
2	PS Malaka	2	0	2	0	2	2	0	2	Qualification to the knockout stage			1–1	
3	Persap	2	0	1	1	2	3	−1	1		1–2			
4	Persim Manggarai (W)	0	0	0	0	0	0	0	0	Withdrew (Note: Persim Manggarai withdrew from the competition.)				

Source: Liga 4 East Nusa Tenggara
Legend: Blue = home team win; Yellow = draw; Red = away team win.
Rules for classification: 1) Points; 2) Head-to-head points; 3) Head-to-head goal difference; 4) Head-to-head goals scored; 5) Goal difference; 6) Goals scored; 7) Fair-play points; 8) Draw.
(H) Hosts; (W) Withdrew
Notes:

Group G Matches

Matchday 1 (6 March)
6 March 2025
19:10 WITA (UTC+8)

Persekota	1–1	PS Malaka
	Report

Oepoi Stadium, Kupang

Matchday 2 (10 March)
10 March 2025
17:10 WITA (UTC+8)

Persap	1–2	Persekota
	Report

Oepoi Stadium, Kupang

Matchday 3 (14 March)
14 March 2025
19:10 WITA (UTC+8)

PS Malaka	1–1	Persap

Oepoi Stadium, Kupang

=== Group H ===
All matches will be held at Oepoi Stadium, Kupang.

Pos	Team	Pld	W	D	L	GF	GA	GD	Pts	Qualification	PFT	BMP	PRN	PWA
1	Perseftim	3	2	1	0	5	2	+3	7	Qualification to the Knockout stage		2–2		2–0
2	Biru Muda Perkasa	3	1	2	0	4	3	+1	5	Qualification to the Knockout stage				2–1
3	Perserond	3	1	1	1	2	2	0	4		0–1	0–0		
4	Persewa	3	0	0	3	2	6	−4	0				1–2	

Source: Liga 4 East Nusa Tenggara
Legend: Blue = home team win; Yellow = draw; Red = away team win.
Rules for classification: 1) Points; 2) Head-to-head points; 3) Head-to-head goal difference; 4) Head-to-head goals scored; 5) Goal difference; 6) Goals scored; 7) Fair-play points; 8) Draw.

Group H Matches

Matchday 1 (7 March)
7 March 2025
19:10 WITA (UTC+8)

Perserond	0–0	Biru Muda Perkasa
	Report

Oepoi Stadium, Kupang
7 March 2025
21:20 WITA (UTC+8)

Perseftim	2–0	Persewa
	Report

Oepoi Stadium, Kupang

Matchday 2 (11 March)
11 March 2025
19:10 WITA (UTC+8)

Persewa	1–2	Perserond
	Report

Oepoi Stadium, Kupang
11 March 2025
21:20 WITA (UTC+8)

Perseftim	2–2	Biru Muda Perkasa
	Report

Oepoi Stadium, Kupang

Matchday 3 (15 March)
15 March 2025
16:00 WITA (UTC+8)

Perserond	0–1	Perseftim
	Report

Oepoi Stadium, Kupang
15 March 2025
18:30 WITA (UTC+8)

Biru Muda Perkasa	2–1	Persewa
	Report

Oepoi Stadium, Kupang

== Knockout stage ==
The knockout stage will be played as a single match. If tied after regulation time, extra time and, if necessary, a penalty shoot-out will be used to decide the winning team. The top three teams will qualify to the national phase.

=== Bracket ===
Round of 16
16 March 2025 – Kupang
A1	Persamba (w/o)	3
C2	Persada	0
16 March 2025 – Kupang
B1	PSN	0 (1)
D2	Perse (p)	0 (2)
17 March 2025 – Kupang
E1	Persebata	1
G2	PS Malaka	0
17 March 2025 – Kupang
F1	Persami	3
H2	Biru Muda Perkasa	1
16 March 2025 – Kupang
C1	Tiara Nusa	2
A2	Persematim	0
16 March 2025 – Kupang
D1	Bintang Timur Atambua	3
B2	PSKN	2
17 March 2025 – Kupang
G1	Persekota	1 (7)
E2	Bajak Laut (p)	1 (8)
17 March 2025 – Kupang
H1	Perseftim (p)	0 (4)
F2	Citra Bakti	0 (1)

Quarter-finals
18 March 2025 – Kupang
Persamba	1
Perse	2
19 March 2025 – Kupang
Persebata	3
Persami	1
18 March 2025 – Kupang
Tiara Nusa	2
Bintang Timur Atambua	3
19 March 2025 – Kupang
Bajak Laut	0
Perseftim (a.e.t.)	3

Semi-finals
21 March 2025 – Kupang
Perse	1
Persebata (a.e.t.)	2
21 March 2025 – Kupang
Bintang Timur Atambua	1
Perseftim	0

Final
24 March 2025 – Kupang
Persebata	2 (2)
Bintang Timur Atambua (p)	2 (4)
Third place play-off
23 March 2025 – Kupang
Perse	2
Perseftim (a.e.t.)	3

=== Round of 16 ===
16 March 2025
14:00 WITA (UTC+8)

Persamba	3–0 Awarded	Persada

Oepoi Stadium, Kupang

Persamba won on walkover and advanced to the quarter-finals after Persada refused to continue the match due to a controversial penalty awarded by the referee for the home team before the end of the match. The original score was 2–2.

16 March 2025
16:30 WITA (UTC+8)

PSN	0–0 (a.e.t.)	Perse
	Report
Penalties
Penalty missed Penalty scored	1–2	Penalty missed Penalty scored

Oepoi Stadium, Kupang

16 March 2025
19:15 WITA (UTC+8)

Tiara Nusa	2–0	Persematim
	Report

Oepoi Stadium, Kupang

16 March 2025
21:45 WITA (UTC+8)

Bintang Timur Atambua	3–2	PSKN
	Report

Oepoi Stadium, Kupang

17 March 2025
14:00 WITA (UTC+8)

Persebata	1–0	PS Malaka
	Report

Oepoi Stadium, Kupang

17 March 2025
16:30 WITA (UTC+8)

Persami	3–1	Biru Muda Perkasa
	Report

Oepoi Stadium, Kupang

17 March 2025
19:15 WITA (UTC+8)

Persekota	1–1 (a.e.t.)	Bajak Laut
	Report
Penalties
Penalty scored Penalty missed	7–8	Penalty missed Penalty scored

Oepoi Stadium, Kupang

17 March 2025
21:45 WITA (UTC+8)

Perseftim	0–0 (a.e.t.)	Citra Bakti
	Report
Penalties
Penalty scored	4–1	Penalty missed Penalty scored

Oepoi Stadium, Kupang

=== Quarter-finals ===
18 March 2025
15:00 WITA (UTC+8)

Persamba	1–2	Perse
	Report

Oepoi Stadium, Kupang

18 March 2025
18:30 WITA (UTC+8)

Tiara Nusa	2–3	Bintang Timur Atambua
	Report

Oepoi Stadium, Kupang

19 March 2025
15:00 WITA (UTC+8)

Persebata	3–1	Persami
	Report

Oepoi Stadium, Kupang

19 March 2025
18:30 WITA (UTC+8)

Bajak Laut	0–3 (a.e.t.)	Perseftim
	Report

Oepoi Stadium, Kupang

=== Semi-finals ===
21 March 2025
15:00 WITA (UTC+8)

Perse	1–2 (a.e.t.)	Persebata
	Report

Oepoi Stadium, Kupang

21 March 2025
19:00 WITA (UTC+8)

Bintang Timur Atambua	1–0	Perseftim
	Report

Oepoi Stadium, Kupang

=== Third place play-off ===
23 March 2025
19:00 WITA (UTC+8)

Perse	2–3 (a.e.t.)	Perseftim
	Report

Oepoi Stadium, Kupang

=== Final ===
24 March 2025
19:00 WITA (UTC+8)

Persebata	2–2 (a.e.t.)	Bintang Timur Atambua
	Report
Penalties
Penalty scored Penalty missed	2–4	Penalty scored

Oepoi Stadium, Kupang

== See also ==
- 2024–25 Liga 4
