= 2017 Liga 3 East Nusa Tenggara =

Football league season in Indonesia

Liga 3 East Nusa Tenggara
- Season: 2017

The 2017 Liga 3 East Nusa Tenggara (also known as XXVIII El Tari Memorial Cup) is the third edition of Liga 3 East Nusa Tenggara as a qualifying round for the national round of 2017 Liga 3. PSN Ngada are the defending champions.

== Teams ==
There are 19 clubs which will participate the league in this season.

#	Group A
1	Perse Ende
2	Persamba West Manggarai
3	Persab Belu
4	Persim Manggarai
5	Persematim East Manggarai

#	Group B
1	Persena Nagakeo
2	Persemal Malaka
3	Persiteng Central Sumba
4	Persesba West Sumba
5	Persewa Waingapu (East Sumba)

#	Group C
1	Perseftim East Flores
2	Perss Soe (South Central Timor)
3	Persedaya Southwest Sumba
4	Perserond Rote Ndao
5	Persebata Lembata

#	Group D
1	PSN Ngada
2	Persami Maumere (Sikka)
3	Persap Alor
4	PSKK Kupang City

== Group stage ==
This stage scheduled starts on 22 July 2017.

=== Group A ===
Pos	Team	Pld	W	D	L	GF	GA	GD	Pts	Qualification
1	Perse Ende	4	3	1	0	12	2	+10	10	Advance to second round
2	Persab Belu	4	3	0	1	9	3	+6	9	Advance to second round
3	Persamba West Manggarai	4	2	1	1	5	2	+3	7	
4	Persematim East Manggarai	4	1	0	3	6	15	−9	3	
5	Persim Manggarai	4	0	0	4	1	12	−11	0	

Updated to match(es) played on 3 August 2017. Source:
22 July 2017
20:00 WITA

Perse Ende	1-1	Persamba West Manggarai
Hamdi Sula 50'	Report	Rus Mite

Marilonga Stadium, Ende

=== Group B ===
Pos	Team	Pld	W	D	L	GF	GA	GD	Pts	Qualification
1	Persemal Malaka	4	3	1	0	9	5	+4	10	Advance to second round
2	Persesba West Sumba	4	3	0	1	4	2	+2	9	Advance to second round
3	Persena Nagekeo	4	2	1	1	5	2	+3	7	
4	Persiteng Central Sumba	4	0	1	3	2	6	−4	1	
5	Persewa Waingapu	4	0	1	3	3	8	−5	1	

Updated to match(es) played on 3 August 2017. Source:

=== Group C ===
Pos	Team	Pld	W	D	L	GF	GA	GD	Pts	Qualification
1	Perseftim East Flores	4	2	1	1	8	9	−1	7	Advance to second round
2	Persebata Lembata	4	2	0	2	8	8	0	6	Advance to second round
3	Perserond Rote Ndao	4	1	2	1	7	6	+1	5	
4	Perss Soe	4	1	2	1	6	6	0	5	
5	Persedaya Southwest Sumba	4	1	1	2	8	8	0	4	

Updated to match(es) played on 2 August 2017. Source:

=== Group D ===
Pos	Team	Pld	W	D	L	GF	GA	GD	Pts	Qualification
1	PSN Ngada	3	3	0	0	6	1	+5	9	Advance to second round
2	PSKK Kupang City	3	2	0	1	6	2	+4	6	Advance to second round
3	Persap Alor	3	1	0	2	4	9	−5	3	
4	Persami Maumere	3	0	0	3	2	6	−4	0	

Updated to match(es) played on 2 August 2017. Source:
