= 2022 Liga 3 East Nusa Tenggara =

El Tari Memorial Cup XXXI 2022

Tournament details
- Country: Indonesia
- Dates: 9 – 29 September 2022
- Teams: 24

Final positions
- Champions: Perse (3rd title)
- Runners-up: Persebata
- Third place: Persim
- Fourth place: Perserond
- Qualified for: 2022 Liga 3 National Round

Tournament statistics
- Matches played: 50
- Goals scored: 108 (2.16 per match)

The 2022 Liga 3 East Nusa Tenggara or 2022 El Tari Memorial Cup XXXI is the fourth season of Liga 3 Zone East Nusa Tenggara organized by Asprov PSSI NTT.

Followed by 24 clubs. The winner of this competition will advance to the national round.

PS Malaka is the defending champion after winning it in the 2019.

== Teams ==
2022 Liga 3 East Nusa Tenggara was attended by 24 teams.

No	Team	Location
01	Bintang Timur Atambua	Belu Regency
02	Persab	Belu Regency
03	Perse	Ende Regency
04	Perseftim	East Flores Regency
05	Putera Oesao	Kupang Regency
06	PSK	Kupang Regency
07	Persebata (Host)	Lembata Regency
08	PS Malaka	Malaka Regency
09	Persim	Manggarai Regency
10	Persematim	East Manggarai Regency
11	Nirwana 04	Nagekeo Regency
12	Persena	Nagekeo Regency
13	PSN	Ngada Regency
14	Perserond	Rote Ndao Regency
15	Persarai	Sabu Raijua Regency
16	Persami	Sikka Regency
17	Persada	Southwest Sumba Regency
18	Persisteng	Central Sumba Regency
19	Persewa	East Sumba Regency
20	Perss	South Central Timor Regency
21	PSKN	North Central Timor Regency
22	Kristal	Kupang
23	Platina	Kupang
24	PSKK	Kupang

== Venues ==
- Gelora 99 Stadium, Lembata Regency
- Polres Lembata Field, Lembata Regency

== Group stage ==
=== Group A ===
Pos	Team	Pld	W	D	L	GF	GA	GD	Pts	Qualification	PSI	PFM	PMA	PMM
1	Persami	3	2	0	1	5	2	+3	6	Advance to knockout stage	—			
2	Perseftim	3	2	0	1	3	2	+1	6	Advance to knockout stage	0–1	—		
3	PS Malaka	3	1	1	1	4	4	0	4	Possible Advance to knockout stage	2–1	0–1	—	2–2
4	Persematim	3	0	1	2	3	7	−4	1		0–3	1–2		—

Source: Liga 3 2022 East Nusa Tenggara
Legend: Blue = home team win; Yellow = draw; Red = away team win.

=== Group B ===
Pos	Team	Pld	W	D	L	GF	GA	GD	Pts	Qualification	PTA	PLA	PSD	BTA
1	Persebata (H)	3	2	1	0	4	2	+2	7	Advance to knockout stage	—	2–1	2–1	
2	Platina	3	2	0	1	4	3	+1	6	Advance to knockout stage		—		
3	Perserond	3	1	0	2	4	4	0	3	Possible Advance to knockout stage		1–2	—	
4	Bintang Timur Atambua	3	0	1	2	0	3	−3	1		0–0	0–1	0–2	—

Source: Liga 3 2022 East Nusa Tenggara
Legend: Blue = home team win; Yellow = draw; Red = away team win.
(H) Hosts

=== Group C ===
Pos	Team	Pld	W	D	L	GF	GA	GD	Pts	Qualification	PSS	N04	POS	PTG
1	Perss	3	1	2	0	4	3	+1	5	Advance to knockout stage	—	2–1	0–0	
2	Nirwana 04	3	1	1	1	3	2	+1	4	Advance to knockout stage		—		
3	Putera Oesao	3	0	3	0	2	2	0	3	Possible Advance to knockout stage		0–0	—	
4	Persiteng	3	0	2	1	4	6	−2	2		2–2	0–2	2–2	—

Source: Liga 3 2022 East Nusa Tenggara
Legend: Blue = home team win; Yellow = draw; Red = away team win.

=== Group D ===
Pos	Team	Pld	W	D	L	GF	GA	GD	Pts	Qualification	PWA	PRI	PSB	KEF
1	Persewa	3	2	1	0	4	2	+2	7	Advance to knockout stage	—			2–1
2	Persarai	3	1	2	0	5	2	+3	5	Advance to knockout stage	1–1	—		3–0
3	Persab	3	1	1	1	4	4	0	4	Possible Advance to knockout stage	0–1	1–1	—	3–2
4	PSKN	3	0	0	3	3	8	−5	0					—

Source: Liga 3 2022 East Nusa Tenggara
Legend: Blue = home team win; Yellow = draw; Red = away team win.

=== Group E ===
Pos	Team	Pld	W	D	L	GF	GA	GD	Pts	Qualification	PSE	PIM	PKK	PSK
1	Perse	3	1	2	0	5	1	+4	5	Advance to knockout stage	—	0–0		4–0
2	Persim	3	1	1	1	1	1	0	4	Advance to knockout stage		—		0–1
3	PSKK	3	1	1	1	2	2	0	4	Possible Advance to knockout stage	1–1	0–1	—	1–0
4	PSK	3	1	0	2	1	5	−4	3					—

Source: Liga 3 2022 East Nusa Tenggara
Legend: Blue = home team win; Yellow = draw; Red = away team win.

=== Group F ===
Pos	Team	Pld	W	D	L	GF	GA	GD	Pts	Qualification	PSN	KRI	PDA	PNA
1	PSN	3	3	0	0	6	0	+6	9	Advance to knockout stage	—		1–0	2–0
2	Kristal	3	1	1	1	1	3	−2	4	Advance to knockout stage	0–3	—	1–0	0–0
3	Persada	3	1	0	2	1	2	−1	3	Possible Advance to knockout stage			—	
4	Persena	3	0	1	2	0	3	−3	1				0–1	—

Source: Liga 3 2022 East Nusa Tenggara
Legend: Blue = home team win; Yellow = draw; Red = away team win.

=== Ranking of third place ===
Pos	Team	Pld	W	D	L	GF	GA	GD	Pts	Qualification
1	Persab	3	1	1	1	4	4	0	4	Advance to knockout stage
2	PS Malaka	3	1	1	1	4	4	0	4	Advance to knockout stage
3	PSKK	3	1	1	1	2	2	0	4	Advance to knockout stage
4	Perserond	3	1	0	2	4	4	0	3	Advance to knockout stage
5	Putera Oesao	3	0	3	0	2	2	0	3	
6	Persada	3	1	0	2	1	2	−1	3	

Source: Liga 3 2022 East Nusa Tenggara

== Knockout stage ==
Round of 16
19 September
Persami	1
Persab	0
19 September
Persebata (pen.)	2 (4)
PS Malaka	2 (3)
19 September
Perss	1
PSKK	3
19 September
Persewa	0
Perserond	2
20 September
Perse	2
Kristal	0
20 September
Perseftim	2
Nirwana 04	1
20 September
PSN	1 (3)
Persim (pen.)	1 (4)
20 September
Platina	0
Persarai	1

Quarter-finals
22 September
Persami	1 (2)
Persebata (pen.)	1 (4)
22 September
PSKK	1 (5)
Perserond (pen.)	1 (6)
23 September
Perse	1
Perseftim	0
23 September
Persim	2
Persarai	1

Semi-finals
25 September
Persebata (pen.)	1 (5)
Perserond	1 (4)
26 September
Perse	1
Persim	0

Final
29 September
Persebata	2 (2)
Perse (pen.)	2 (3)
Third place
28 September
Perserond	2
Persim	3

== Awards ==
Awards
Best player	Team	Ref.
Arsenius Ola	Persebata	
Top scorer (goals)	Team	Ref.
Andika Romansa Mokan (6)	Persim	
Champion team		Ref.
Perse		
Fairplay team		Ref.
Persebata		
