= List of association football club rivalries in Indonesia =

This is a list of the main association football rivalries in Indonesia.

== National ==
National rivalry is the top level major rivalry in football in Indonesia.

Rivalry	Teams
Indonesian El Clásico	Persib Bandung v. Persija Jakarta
Perserikatan rivalries	Persebaya Surabaya v. Persib Bandung v. Persija Jakarta v. PSM Makassar v. PSMS Medan

== Regional ==
Regional rivalry is a rivalry that occurs on the same island but between different provinces.

Rivalry	Teams
Mataram derby	Persis Solo v. PSIM Yogyakarta
Persiraja–PSMS rivalry	Persiraja Banda Aceh v. PSMS Medan
Persebaya–PSIS rivalry	Persebaya Surabaya v. PSIS Semarang
Persija–Persita rivalry	Persija Jakarta v. Persita Tangerang
Andalas derby	Semen Padang v. Sriwijaya
Jagorawi derby	Persija Jakarta v. Persikabo 1973
Papadaan derby	Borneo Samarinda v. Barito Putera
Arema–Persib rivalry	Arema v. Persib Bandung

== Province ==
Provincial rivalry is a rivalry that occurs in the same province. The list is arranged by island and archipelago region.

=== Sumatra ===
Rivalry	Teams
North Sumatra derby	PSDS Deli Serdang v. PSMS Medan
Classic Aceh derby	Persiraja Banda Aceh v. PSAP Sigli
South Sumatra derby	Sriwijaya v. Sumsel United

=== Java ===
Rivalry	Teams
Super East Java derby	Arema v. Persebaya Surabaya
Arema–Persik rivalry	Arema v. Persik Kediri
Super Central Java derby	PSIS Semarang v. Persis Solo
Pasundan derby	Persib Bandung v. Persikabo 1973
Suramadu derby	Persebaya Surabaya v. Madura United
Banten derby	Perserang Serang v. Persita Tangerang
Dewa United–Persita rivalry	Dewa United v. Persita Tangerang
Persebaya–Persik rivalry	Persebaya Surabaya v. Persik Kediri
Ciliwung derby	Persikabo Bogor v. Persikad Depok
Special Region of Yogyakarta derby	PSIM Yogyakarta v. PSS Sleman
Pesik–PSGJ rivalry	Pesik Kuningan v. PSGJ Cirebon
Ngapak derby	Persibangga Purbalingga v. Persibas Banyumas
Persela–Persibo rivalry	Persela Lamongan v. Persibo Bojonegoro
Deltras–Gresik United rivalry	Deltras v. Gresik United
Kendal Tornado–PSIS rivalry	Kendal Tornado v. PSIS Semarang
Muria derby	Persiku Kudus v. Persijap Jepara

=== Kalimantan ===
Rivalry	Teams
Mahakam derby	Borneo Samarinda v. PS Mitra Kukar
Super East Kalimantan derby	Persiba Balikpapan v. PS Mitra Kukar
Borneo Samarinda–Persiba rivalry	Borneo Samarinda v. Persiba Balikpapan

=== Lesser Sunda Islands ===
Rivalry	Teams
Persami–Perse rivalry	Persami Maumere v. Perse Ende
Perse–Persim rivalry	Perse Ende v. Persim Manggarai
Perse–PSN rivalry	Perse Ende v. PSN Ngada
Perseftim–PSN rivalry	Perseftim East Flores v. PSN Ngada

=== Sulawesi ===
Rivalry	Teams
Super North Sulawesi derby	Persma Manado v. Persmin Minahasa

=== Maluku Islands ===
Rivalry	Teams
Old North Maluku derby	Persiter Ternate v. Persikota Tidore

=== Papua ===
Rivalry	Teams
Persipura–PSBS rivalry	Persipura Jayapura v. PSBS Biak
Persewar–PSBS rivalry	Persewar Waropen v. PSBS Biak

== City and regency ==
City and regency rivalry is a rivalry that occurs between adjacent cities and regency.

Rivalry	Teams
Tangerang derby	Persita Tangerang v. Persikota Tangerang
Jakarta derby	Persija Jakarta v. Persitara North Jakarta
Bandung derby	Persib Bandung v. Persikab Bandung
Bogor derby	Persikabo Bogor v. PSB Bogor
Kupang derby	Persekota Koepang v. PSK Kupang
Kutai Kartanegara derby	Persikukar Kutai Kartanegara v. PS Mitra Kukar
Jayapura derby	Persipura Jayapura v. Persidafon Dafonsoro
Pasuruan derby	Persekabpas Pasuruan v. Persekap Pasuruan
Semarang derby	Persikas Semarang v. PSIS Semarang
Malang derby	Arema v. Persema Malang
Blitar derby	PSBI Blitar v. PSBK Blitar
Sidoarjo derby	Deltras v. Persida Sidoarjo
Deli Serdang derby	PS Kwarta v. PSDS Deli Serdang
Tasikmalaya derby	Persikotas Tasikmalaya v. Persitas Tasikmalaya
Bekasi derby	Persikasi Bekasi v. Persipasi Bekasi

== Other rivalries ==
Other rivalries are those that occur between islands, regions, provinces, cities, which are relatively new or are usually only temporary rivalries at the top or second level in Indonesian football.

Rivalry	Teams
Eastern Indonesia Red derby (defunct)	PSM Makassar v. Malut United
