= Persebata Lembata =

Indonesian football club

Persebata
- Full name: Persatuan Sepakbola Lembata
- Nickname: Laskar Sembur Paus
- Founded: 1999; 27 years ago
- Stadium: Gelora 99 Stadium; Oepoi Stadium
- Capacity: 3,000; 10,000
- Owner: Lembata Regency Government
- Manager: Abdul Syukur Wulakada
- Coach: Edward Togo
- League: Liga 4
- 2025–26: Liga Nusantara, 5th (Group D); Relegation play-off loser (relegated)
Home colours	Away colours

Persatuan Sepakbola Lembata (simply known as Persebata) is an Indonesian football club based in Lembata Regency, East Nusa Tenggara. They will compete in Liga 4, the fourth tier of Indonesian football league system, starting from the 2026–27 season after being relegated from Liga Nusantara through a relegation play-off match against Persikutim United at the end of 2025–26 season. Their homeground is Gelora 99 Stadium in Lembata and Oepoi Stadium in Kupang.

== History ==
=== Early formation ===
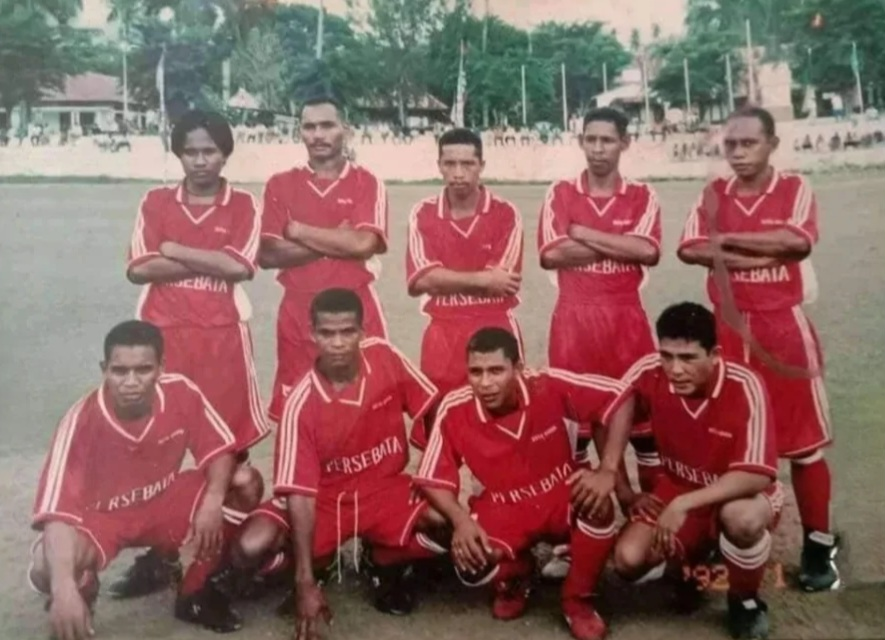
Persebata squad in 1999 El Tari Memorial Cup held at Ende Regency.

Founded in 1999 after the establishment of Lembata Regency on 12 October 1999 as a result of the separation from East Flores Regency, the PSSI Lembata Regency Association was formed as the governing body of this club. After a month of the founding of Lembata Regency, they participated in the 1999 El Tari Memorial Cup in Ende Regency. The squad consists of Ryan Walili, Ansi Lensa, Inosius Sanjaya, Jou Kasim, Mukin, Yoseph Lanjar, Husain Atamuan, Gomez Luan, Salem Mustafa, and Herri Rungkat.

=== Liga 3 and Liga 4 era ===
Persebata for the first time had the best achievement at 2022 El Tari Memorial Cup (as Liga 3 East Nusa Tenggara), as hosts they managed to reach the final but unfortunately lost to Perse Ende after drawing 2–2 and losing on penalties 2–3 at the Gelora 99 Stadium, Lembata.

In the 2025 El Tari Memorial Cup (as Liga 4 East Nusa Tenggara), they again achieved the runner-up title after losing in the final to Bintang Timur Atambua with a score of 2–4 in the penalty shootout after drawing 2–2 in normal time at the Oepoi Stadium, Kupang. However, they have the right to represent East Nusa Tenggara with two other clubs, namely Bintang Timur Atambua as champion and Perseftim East Flores as third place.

In the 2024–25 Liga 4 national phase, in the first round they managed to Group P winners with a result of 2 wins and 1 draw, and ensured qualification to the second round, all matches were held in Kompyang Sujana Stadium and Ngurah Rai Stadium, Denpasar. In the second round held at the same venued, they again qualified as Group X winners with a result of 2 wins and 1 draw, advancing to the third round. On 14 May 2025, Persebata secured promotion to Liga Nusantara for the first time in their history from 2025–26 season after draw against Persika Karanganyar 1–1 at Sultan Agung Stadium in Bantul, which was the last match in Group B due to difference goal. They managed to advance to the fourth round with the status of second place in the group. In the fourth round, Persebata was included in Group A along with Persitara North Jakarta, Tri Brata Rafflesia, and Perseden Denpasar. They managed 3 draws with 4 goals scored and 4 conceded, but failed to advance to the finals as they finished 2nd position in their group. They were also unbeaten throughout the competition in 12 matches.

To play their home games in Liga Nusantara, they chose to base themselves at the Oepoi Stadium in Kupang, this was due to the lack of readiness of the Gelora 99 Stadium and supporting facilities in Lembata. However, it was not used because the Liga Nusantara was finally held at a centralized venue.

=== Liga Nusantara era ===
In the 2025–26 Liga Nusantara season, they only managed to survive for one season, and the following season, they were relegated back to Liga 4 after losing in the relegation play-offs. Their final decisive match ended in defeat against Persikutim United with a score of 0–2 at UHS Stadium, Surakarta on 2 February 2026.

== Players ==
=== Current squad ===
As of 29 November 2025

Note: Flags indicate national team as defined under FIFA eligibility rules; some limited exceptions apply. Players may hold more than one non-FIFA nationality.

No.	Pos.	Nation	Player
2	DF	IDN	Angga Sukmantoro
3	DF	IDN	Ali Anwar
4	DF	IDN	Arya Abdullah
5	DF	IDN	Valentinus Rimo
7	FW	IDN	Khoirul Anwar
8	MF	IDN	Petrus Dulimaking
10	FW	IDN	Yohanes Toi
11	FW	IDN	Fransisko Kota
12	DF	IDN	Marinus Nembafu
13	DF	IDN	Juan Simopiaref
14	FW	IDN	Ronaldus Sambi
15	DF	IDN	Yohanes Kopong (captain)
16	MF	IDN	Haidar Abdan
17	FW	IDN	Imran Hamsi
18	DF	IDN	Abdul Mahmud

No.	Pos.	Nation	Player
19	FW	IDN	Yohanes Baghi
21	FW	IDN	Asmin Dani
22	MF	IDN	Jepli Matondang
24	MF	IDN	Yohanes Ihing
27	MF	IDN	Zidane Zulkarnaen
29	MF	IDN	Fandy Tanauma
35	MF	IDN	Juang Pratama
53	DF	IDN	Gesang Hidayatullah
54	GK	IDN	Jhordy Pradana
73	GK	IDN	Bryan Fomeni
74	FW	IDN	Rafa Faaza
87	MF	IDN	Miftakhul Ilham
91	MF	IDN	Yoska Cavalera
96	FW	IDN	Al Wino Zacqy
99	GK	IDN	Pius Pero

== Coaches ==
Name	Nationality	Season(s)	Ref.
Aloysius Nedabang	Indonesia	2009	
Willem Senegal	Indonesia	2014–2019	
Mathias Bisinglasi	Indonesia	2021	
Maura H. Betekeneng	Indonesia	2022	
Hasan H. Wahar	Indonesia	2022–2025	
Adnan Mahing	Indonesia	2025	
Edward Y. Togo	Indonesia	2025–2026	

== Supporters ==
Lomblen Mania is the supporter of Persebata Lembata. The originator of Lomblen Mania is Jepo Uran. They there is in several districts from areas, such as Lewoleba, Bluwa, Walangkeam, Tujuh Maret, Rayuan, Rimba, Eropaun, Berdikari, Wangatoa, Lamahora, Waijarang, and Woloklaus.

They have a distinctive slogan baleo, taken from the word for the traditional sperm whale hunt of the Lamalera people in Lembata. Singing songs with "baleo, baleo!" to raise the spirits of the Persebata players in football pitch.

== Season-by-season records ==
=== Records ===
Season	League											Piala Indonesia
Season	Comp.		App.	W	D	L	GF	GA	GD	Pts.	Pos.	Piala Indonesia
2024–25	Liga 4	First round	3	2	1	0	7	5	2	7	1st, Group P	Not held
2024–25	Liga 4	Second round	3	2	1	0	5	1	4	7	1st, Group X	Not held
2024–25	Liga 4	Third round	3	1	2	0	3	1	2	5	2nd, Group B (Note: Each winners and runners-up from 4 groups, namely 8 clubs from 16 clubs playing in the third round will get a promotion quota to the Liga Nusantara and advance to the fourth round.)	Not held
2024–25	Liga 4	Fourth round	3	0	3	0	4	4	0	3	2nd, Group A	Not held
2024–25	Liga 4	Final	Not advanced									Not held
2025–26	Liga Nusantara	Regular round	15	5	3	7	13	16	-3	18	5th, Group D	Not held
2025–26	Liga Nusantara	Knockout round	1	0	0	1	0	2	-2	0	Relegation play-off loser	Not held
2026–27	Liga 4											Not held

Champion	Runner-up	Promotion	Relegation

=== Season-by-season ===
Season(s)	Tier	Division	Place	Piala Indonesia
2017	3	L3	eliminated in provincial phase	–
2018	3	L3	eliminated in provincial phase	–
2019	3	L3	eliminated in provincial phase	–
2020	3	L3	season abandoned	–
2021–22	3	L3	did not participating	–
2022–23	3	L3	season abandoned	–
2023–24	3	L3	eliminated in provincial phase	–
2024–25	4	L4	2nd in NP R4 A	–
2025–26	3	LN	relegation play-off loser	–
2026–27	4	L4		–

- 1 season in Liga Nusantara
- 2 season in Liga 4
- 7 seasons in Liga 3 (defunct)

== Honours ==
- El Tari Memorial Cup
  - Runners-up (2): 2022, 2025
