= PSN Nunukan =

Indonesian football club

- Full name: Persatuan Sepakbola Nunukan
- Nickname: Macan Nunukan
- Ground: Sungai Bilal Stadium; Nunukan, North Kalimantan
- Capacity: 10,000
- Owner: Askab PSSI Nunukan
- Manager: Irsan Humokor
- Coach: Fadil
- League: Liga 4
- 2024–25: 2nd, (North Kalimantan zone)
Home colours	Away colours

Persatuan Sepakbola Nunukan (simply known as PSN Nunukan) is an Indonesian football club based in Nunukan Regency, North Kalimantan. They currently compete in the Liga 4. They based in Nunukan Regency which is the Indonesia–Malaysia border and their homeground is Sungai Bilal Stadium.

== Honours ==
- Liga Indonesia Second Division East Kalimantan
  - Runner-up (1): 2004
