= 2024–25 Liga 4 North Kalimantan =

Liga 4 North Kalimantan
- Season: 2024–25
- Dates: 15–19 March 2025
- Champions: Persemal (1st title)
- National phase: Persemal
- Matches: 4
- Goals: 8 (2 per match)
- Biggest win: PSN Nunukan 0–2 Persemal (15 March 2025); Persemal 0–2 PSN Nunukan (16 March 2025)
- Highest scoring: PSN Nunukan 0–2 Persemal (15 March 2025); Persemal 0–2 PSN Nunukan (16 March 2025)

The 2024–25 Liga 4 North Kalimantan was the inaugural season of Liga 4 North Kalimantan after the change in the structure of Indonesian football competition and serves as a qualifying round for the national phase of the 2024–25 Liga 4.

The competition is organised by the North Kalimantan Provincial PSSI Association.

== Teams ==
=== Participating teams ===
A total of 2 teams are competing in this season.

| No | Team | Location |
|---|---|---|
| 1 | PSN Nunukan | Nunukan Regency |
| 2 | Persemal | Malinau Regency |

== League table ==
All matches will be held at Sei Bilal Stadium, Nunukan.

| Pos | Team | Pld | W | D | L | GF | GA | GD | Pts | Qualification |
|---|---|---|---|---|---|---|---|---|---|---|
| 1 | Persemal (C) | 4 | 2 | 0 | 2 | 4 | 4 | 0 | 6 (Note: Ranked on head-to-head away goals scored: Persemal 3, PSN Nunukan 2.) | Qualification for the National phase |
| 2 | PSN Nunukan (H) | 4 | 2 | 0 | 2 | 4 | 4 | 0 | 6 | |

Source: Liga 4 North Kalimantan
Rules for classification: 1) Head-to-head points; 2) Head-to-head goal difference; 3) Head-to-head goals scored; 4) Head-to-head away goals scored; 5) Fair-play points; 6) Draw.
(C) Champions; (H) Hosts

== Results ==
| Home \ Away | MAL | PSN | MAL | PSN |
|---|---|---|---|---|
| Persemal | | 0–2 | | 1–0 |
| PSN Nunukan | 0–2 | | 2–1 | |

Source: Liga 4 North Kalimantan
Legend: Blue = home team win; Yellow = draw; Red = away team win.
For upcoming matches, an "a" indicates there is an article about the rivalry between the two participants.

=== Matches ===
Matchday 1 (15 March)
15 March 2025
20:00 WITA (UTC+8)

| PSN Nunukan | 0–2 | Persemal |
|---|---|---|
| | Report |

Sei Bilal Stadium, Nunukan

Matchday 2 (16 March)
16 March 2025
20:30 WITA (UTC+8)

| Persemal | 0–2 | PSN Nunukan |
|---|---|---|
| | Report |

Sei Bilal Stadium, Nunukan

Matchday 3 (18 March)
18 March 2025
20:45 WITA (UTC+8)

| Persemal | 1–0 | PSN Nunukan |
|---|---|---|
| | Report |

Sei Bilal Stadium, Nunukan

Matchday 4 (19 March)
19 March 2025
20:45 WITA (UTC+8)

| PSN Nunukan | 2–1 | Persemal |

Sei Bilal Stadium, Nunukan

== See also ==
- 2024–25 Liga 4
