= PS Malaka =

Indonesian football club

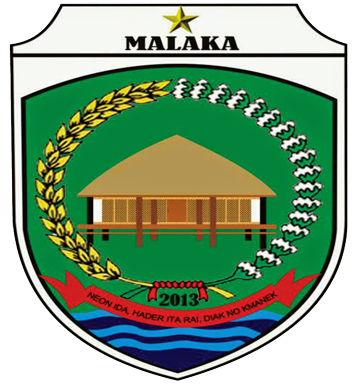
- Full name: Persatuan Sepakbola Malaka
- Nickname: Laskar Manu Meo
- Founded: 2013; 13 years ago
- Ground: Betun Field; Malaka Regency, East Nusa Tenggara
- Owner: PSSI Malaka Regency
- Chairman: Robertus Belarminus Klau
- Coach: Adrianus Bria Seran
- League: Liga 4
- 2022: Round of 16, (East Nusa Tenggara zone)
Home colours

Persatuan Sepakbola Malaka (simply known as PS Malaka; previously named Persemal Malaka) is an Indonesian football club based in Malaka, East Nusa Tenggara. They currently play in Liga 4 and their homeground is Betun Field.

== Honours ==
- Liga 3 East Nusa Tenggara
  - Champion (1): 2019
