= 2024–25 Liga 4 =

First season of the Liga 4 in Indonesia

Liga 4
- Season: 2024–25
- Dates: Provincial phase: 5 December 2024 – 17 April 2025; National phase: 21 April – 27 May 2025
- Champions: Tri Brata Rafflesia; 1st Liga 4 title 1st fourth-tier title
- Promoted: Tri Brata Rafflesia; Persika Karanganyar; Pekanbaru; Persebata; Batavia; Perseden; Sang Maestro; Persitara
- Matches: 178
- Goals: 554 (3.11 per match)
- Best player: Iqbal Tri Saputra
- Top goalscorer: Rizqi Fauzan (14 goals)
- Biggest win: Provincial phase: UMS 1905 1–16 Taruma (10 April 2025); National phase: Persika Karanganyar 7–0 Bintang Timur Atambua (29 April 2025); Persema 7–0 PS Kwarta (1 May 2025)
- Highest scoring: Provincial phase: UMS 1905 1–16 Taruma (10 April 2025); National phase: Persika Karanganyar 7–1 PS Kwarta (21 April 2025); Persic 6–2 Cimahi United (3 May 2025)
- Longest winning run: 7 matches Persika Karanganyar
- Longest unbeaten run: 12 matches Persebata; Persika Karanganyar

The 2024–25 Liga 4 was the inaugural season of the Liga 4, a football league newly established by the PSSI as the fourth tier in the current league system, and the only amateur competition within the structure. The competition is organized by the PSSI Provincial Associations during the provincial phase and by the PSSI during the national phase.

Tri Brata Rafflesia won their first national trophy in the club history, after defeating Persika Karanganyar in the final match.

== Changes from 2023–24 season ==
Starting from the 2024–25 season, the PSSI has restructured Liga 3 into two separate tiers, with Liga Nusantara (third tier) and Liga 4 (fourth tier). Liga Nusantara will operate as a semi-professional league consisting of 16 teams, including 10 teams that reached the third round of the 2023–24 Liga 3 national phase but did not secure promotion to Liga 2. Meanwhile, teams eliminated prior to the third round of the 2023–24 Liga 3 national phase will compete in Liga 4, which remains an amateur-level competition.

== Rules ==
Here are the regulations for the 2024–25 season:

=== Participating clubs ===
- PSSI member clubs or PSSI member candidate clubs who have completed the registration administration requirements as a member of PSSI and have received approval at the relevant provincial PSSI annual congress.
- Registration of participating clubs via the online system SIAP (Sistem Informasi dan Administrasi PSSI).
- All clubs participating in 2024–25 Liga 4 compete in the provincial phase.
- Aspects of football development, enough time lag between one match to another.

=== Player & official ===
- The ages of the players are those born 1 January 2002 to 31 December 2006, and 7 senior players.
- The maximum number of registered players is 21.
- The minimum requirement for a head coach is holding a PSSI B License.
- Player registration via online system SIAP (Sistem Informasi dan Administrasi PSSI).

== Teams ==
The table below shows the number of teams participating in the 38 provincial leagues and the number of slots allocated to each league for the national phase. In this season, a total of 437 teams competed in 35 provincial leagues for 64 slots in the national phase, while 3 provinces did not hold a competition.

Sumatra Region
Provincial leagues	PT	NS
Aceh	12	3
North Sumatra	15	2
Riau	7	2
Riau Islands	—	—
West Sumatra	6	2
Jambi	8	1
Bengkulu	6	1
Bangka Belitung Islands	3	1
South Sumatra	11	2
Lampung	8	1

Kalimantan Region
Provincial leagues	PT	NS
West Kalimantan	13	1
Central Kalimantan	3	1
South Kalimantan	9	2
East Kalimantan	2	1
North Kalimantan	2	1

Java Region
Provincial leagues	PT	NS
Banten	15	2
Jakarta	22	~~(2)~~ 3
West Java	24 (S1)	6
West Java	28 (S2)	—
Central Java	18	4
(Special Region of Yogyakarta) Yogyakarta	7	1
East Java	66	8

Nusa Tenggara Islands Region
Provincial leagues	PT	NS
Bali	9	1
West Nusa Tenggara	20	~~(2)~~ 1
East Nusa Tenggara	32	3

Maluku Islands Region
Provincial leagues	PT	NS
(Maluku (province)) Maluku	4	~~(1)~~ 0
North Maluku	—	—

Sulawesi Region
Provincial leagues	PT	NS
Gorontalo	7	2
North Sulawesi	5	1
Central Sulawesi	8	1
West Sulawesi	7	1
South Sulawesi	16	2
Southeast Sulawesi	8	1

Papua Region
Provincial leagues	PT	NS
Southwest Papua	6	1
(West Papua (province)) West Papua	9	~~(1)~~ 2
Central Papua	7	1
(Papua (province)) Papua	—	—
Highland Papua	8	1
South Papua	6	1

Notes:
- PT (participating teams): Total number of teams participating in each provincial league.
- NS (national slots): Number of slots allocated to each provincial league for the national phase.
- Grey background indicates provinces that did not hold a provincial league competition this season.
- West Java Series 2 has no national slot as it is the second-tier competition of the West Java Provincial League.
- Maluku was initially allocated 1 national slot, but its representative withdrew, and the slot was subsequently reallocated to another provincial league.

== Schedule ==
The schedule of the competition is as follows.

Phase	Round	Draw date	Matchday	Date
Provincial phase	Depending on the league system in each provincial leagues			5 December 2024 – 17 April 2025
National phase	First round (64 teams)	14 April 2025	Matchday 1	21–22 April 2025
National phase	First round (64 teams)	14 April 2025	Matchday 2	23–24 April 2025
National phase	First round (64 teams)	14 April 2025	Matchday 3	25–26 April 2025
National phase	Second round (32 teams)	No draw (Note: Pre-determined format)	Matchday 1	29–30 April 2025
National phase	Second round (32 teams)	No draw	Matchday 2	1–2 May 2025
National phase	Second round (32 teams)	No draw	Matchday 3	3–4 May 2025
National phase	Third round (16 teams)	6 May 2025	Matchday 1	10–11 May 2025
National phase	Third round (16 teams)	6 May 2025	Matchday 2	12–13 May 2025
National phase	Third round (16 teams)	6 May 2025	Matchday 3	14–15 May 2025
National phase	Fourth round (8 teams)	No draw	Matchday 1	20 May 2025
National phase	Fourth round (8 teams)	No draw	Matchday 2	22 May 2025
National phase	Fourth round (8 teams)	No draw	Matchday 3	24 May 2025
National phase	Knockout round (2 teams)	No draw	Final	27 May 2025

== Provincial phase ==
These teams will be the representatives from their provincial league to be competing in national phase. The number of representatives from each provincial league varies based on their league coefficient, with a minimum of one representative club per league.

**Sumatra Region**
Provincial leagues	Qualified teams
Aceh	**Persidi Idi Rayeuk**
Aceh	PSAB Aceh Besar
Aceh	PS Peureulak Raya
North Sumatra	**Victory Dairi**
North Sumatra	PS Kwarta Deli Serdang
Riau	**Wahana**
Riau	Pekanbaru (Note: Persemai Dumai, the runner-up of the 2024–25 Liga 4 Riau, qualified for the national phase but later withdrew due to financial problems. Their slot was subsequently given to Pekanbaru, the third-placed team.)
Riau Islands	Not held
West Sumatra	**Josal Piaman**
West Sumatra	PSPP Padang Panjang
Jambi	**Persebri Batanghari**
Bengkulu	**Tri Brata Rafflesia**
Bangka Belitung Islands	**PS Bangka**
South Sumatra	**PS Palembang**
South Sumatra	KMP Bumara
Lampung	**Persikomet Metro**

**Kalimantan Region**
Provincial leagues	Qualified teams
West Kalimantan	**Gabsis Sambas**
Central Kalimantan	**Sylva Kalteng**
South Kalimantan	**PS Kab. Tapin**
South Kalimantan	Putra Plaosan Martapura
East Kalimantan	**Kartanegara**
North Kalimantan	**Persemal Malinau**

**Java Region**
Provincial leagues	Qualified teams
Banten	**Persic Cilegon**
Banten	Harin
Jakarta	**Batavia**
Jakarta	ASIOP
Jakarta	Persitara North Jakarta (Note: Persitara North Jakarta, the third-placed team of the 2024–25 Liga 4 Jakarta, was selected by PSSI to fill the spot vacated by Siwalima, as there were no eligible clubs remaining from Maluku.)
West Java	~~**PS Cimahi Putra**~~ (Note: PS Cimahi Putra, the champions of the 2024–25 Liga 4 West Java Series 1, qualified for the national phase but withdrew after the draw and prior to playing their first match due to financial problems.)
West Java	Persipu
West Java	Cimahi United
West Java	Pesik Kuningan
West Java	Persikabumi Sukabumi
West Java	Persikasi Bekasi
Central Java	**Persebi Boyolali**
Central Java	Persika Karanganyar
Central Java	Persibat Batang
Central Java	Persip Pekalongan
(Special Region of Yogyakarta) Yogyakarta	**PS HW UMY**
East Java	**Persewangi Banyuwangi**
East Java	Persinga Ngawi
East Java	PS Mojokerto Putra
East Java	Persema Malang
East Java	Sang Maestro
East Java	Mitra Surabaya
East Java	Inter Kediri
East Java	Persikoba Batu

**Nusa Tenggara Islands Region**
Provincial leagues	Qualified teams
Bali	**Perseden Denpasar**
West Nusa; Tenggara	**Persidom Dompu**
West Nusa; Tenggara	~~Garuda Muda~~ (Note: Garuda Muda, the runner-up of the 2024–25 Liga 4 West Nusa Tenggara, qualified for the national phase but later withdrew following the passing of their owner.)
East Nusa Tenggara	**Bintang Timur Atambua**
East Nusa Tenggara	Persebata Lembata
East Nusa Tenggara	Perseftim East Flores

**Sulawesi Region**
Provincial leagues	Qualified teams
Gorontalo	**Kreasindo Rajawali**; **Sultan**
Gorontalo	Persital Talumolo
North Sulawesi	**PS Klabat XIII Jaya Sakti**
Central Sulawesi	**Celebest**
West Sulawesi	**PS Sandeq**
South Sulawesi	**Mangiwang**
South Sulawesi	Perslutim East Luwu
Southeast Sulawesi	**UHO MZF**

**Maluku Islands Region**
Provincial leagues	Qualified teams
(Maluku (province)) Maluku	~~**Siwalima**~~ (Note: Siwalima, the champions of the 2024–25 Liga 4 Maluku, qualified for the national phase but later withdrew due to financial problems.)
North Maluku	Not held

**Papua Region**
Provincial leagues	Qualified teams
Southwest Papua	**Persikos Sorong**
(West Papua (province)) West Papua	**Persipegaf Arfak Mountains**
(West Papua (province)) West Papua	Manokwari United (Note: Manokwari United, the runner-up of the 2024–25 Liga 4 West Papua, was selected by PSSI to fill the spot vacated by Garuda Muda, as there were no eligible clubs remaining from West Nusa Tenggara.)
Central Papua	**Persipuncak Puncak**; **Carstensz**
(Papua (province)) Papua	Not held
Highland Papua	**Persigubin Bintang**; **Mountains**
South Papua	**Persimer Merauke**

Notes:

- BOLD: Champions of each provincial league.
- Grey background denotes provinces that did not sent representative to the national phase.

== National phase ==
The best 64 teams from the provincial phase will compete in this phase to determine the top 8 teams that will be promoted to 2025–26 Liga Nusantara.

=== First round ===
The 64 teams will be drawn into 16 groups of four. The first round will be played in a home tournament format of single round-robin matches.

The top two teams of each group will qualify for the Second round.

Group A
Pos	Team	Pld	W	D	L	GF	GA	GD	Pts	Qualification	PSP	HAR	PBR	UMY
1	(Central Java) Persip (H)	3	2	1	0	3	0	+3	7	Qualification to the Second round		2–0	1–0	
2	(Banten) Harin	3	2	0	1	3	2	+1	6	Qualification to the Second round			2–0	
3	(Jambi) Persebri Batanghari	3	1	0	2	1	3	−2	3					1–0
4	(Special Region of Yogyakarta) PS HW UMY	3	0	1	2	0	2	−2	1		0–0	0–1		

Source: Liga 4 National Phase
Legend: Blue = home team win; Yellow = draw; Red = away team win.
Rules for classification: 1) Points; 2) Head-to-head points; 3) Head-to-head goal difference; 4) Head-to-head goals scored; 5) Goal difference; 6) Goals scored; 7) Fair-play points; 8) Draw.
(H) Hosts

Group B
Pos	Team	Pld	W	D	L	GF	GA	GD	Pts	Qualification	PBT	CEL	PFT	MET
1	(Central Java) Persibat (H)	3	3	0	0	8	0	+8	9	Qualification to the Second round		4–0	3–0	
2	(Central Sulawesi) Celebest	3	2	0	1	7	7	0	6	Qualification to the Second round				3–1
3	(East Nusa Tenggara) Perseftim	3	1	0	2	5	9	−4	3			2–4		
4	(Lampung) Persikomet	3	0	0	3	3	7	−4	0		0–1		2–3	

Source: Liga 4 National Phase
Legend: Blue = home team win; Yellow = draw; Red = away team win.
Rules for classification: 1) Points; 2) Head-to-head points; 3) Head-to-head goal difference; 4) Head-to-head goals scored; 5) Goal difference; 6) Goals scored; 7) Fair-play points; 8) Draw.
(H) Hosts

Group C
Pos	Team	Pld	W	D	L	GF	GA	GD	Pts	Qualification	TBR	CMU	SDQ	PSB
1	(Bengkulu) Tri Brata Rafflesia	3	2	0	1	9	3	+6	6	Qualification to the Second round		1–2	5–0	
2	(West Java) Cimahi United	3	1	2	0	6	5	+1	5	Qualification to the Second round				3–3
3	(West Sulawesi) PS Sandeq	3	1	1	1	2	6	−4	4			1–1		1–0
4	(Bangka Belitung Islands) PS Bangka	3	0	1	2	4	7	−3	1		1–3			

Source: Liga 4 National Phase
Legend: Blue = home team win; Yellow = draw; Red = away team win.
Rules for classification: 1) Points; 2) Head-to-head points; 3) Head-to-head goal difference; 4) Head-to-head goals scored; 5) Goal difference; 6) Goals scored; 7) Fair-play points; 8) Draw.

Group D
Pos	Team	Pld	W	D	L	GF	GA	GD	Pts	Qualification	PSC	PGF	LTM	GBS
1	(Banten) Persic	3	3	0	0	7	2	+5	9	Qualification to the Second round		2–1	4–1	
2	(West Papua (province)) Persipegaf	3	2	0	1	7	3	+4	6	Qualification to the Second round				5–1
3	(South Sulawesi) Perslutim	3	0	1	2	2	6	−4	1			0–1		
4	(West Kalimantan) Gabsis	3	0	1	2	2	7	−5	1		0–1		1–1	

Source: Liga 4 National Phase
Legend: Blue = home team win; Yellow = draw; Red = away team win.
Rules for classification: 1) Points; 2) Head-to-head points; 3) Head-to-head goal difference; 4) Head-to-head goals scored; 5) Goal difference; 6) Goals scored; 7) Fair-play points; 8) Draw.

Group E
Pos	Team	Pld	W	D	L	GF	GA	GD	Pts	Qualification	PBI	PTR	WHN	DOM
1	(Central Java) Persebi (H)	3	3	0	0	12	1	+11	9	Qualification to the Second round		5–1	1–0	
2	(Jakarta) Persitara	3	2	0	1	7	7	0	6	Qualification to the Second round			3–2	
3	(Riau) Wahana	3	0	1	2	2	4	−2	1					0–0
4	(West Nusa Tenggara) Persidom	3	0	1	2	0	9	−9	1		0–6	0–3		

Source: Liga 4 National Phase
Legend: Blue = home team win; Yellow = draw; Red = away team win.
Rules for classification: 1) Points; 2) Head-to-head points; 3) Head-to-head goal difference; 4) Head-to-head goals scored; 5) Goal difference; 6) Goals scored; 7) Fair-play points; 8) Draw.
(H) Hosts

Group F
Pos	Team	Pld	W	D	L	GF	GA	GD	Pts	Qualification	PKA	KWA	KLA	PCK
1	(Central Java) Persika Karanganyar (H)	3	3	0	0	15	2	+13	9	Qualification to the Second round		7–1	2–1	
2	(North Sumatra) PS Kwarta	3	2	0	1	7	9	−2	6	Qualification to the Second round			2–0	
3	(North Sulawesi) PS Klabat XIII Jaya Sakti	3	1	0	2	5	5	0	3					4–1
4	(Central Papua) Persipuncak Carstensz	3	0	0	3	3	14	−11	0		0–6	2–4		

Source: Liga 4 National Phase
Legend: Blue = home team win; Yellow = draw; Red = away team win.
Rules for classification: 1) Points; 2) Head-to-head points; 3) Head-to-head goal difference; 4) Head-to-head goals scored; 5) Goal difference; 6) Goals scored; 7) Fair-play points; 8) Draw.
(H) Hosts

Group G
Pos	Team	Pld	W	D	L	GF	GA	GD	Pts	Qualification	PMP	BTA	PAL	IDI
1	(East Java) PS Mojokerto Putra	3	2	1	0	8	5	+3	7	Qualification to the Second round			3–1	
2	(East Nusa Tenggara) Bintang Timur Atambua	3	1	1	1	8	7	+1	4	Qualification to the Second round	3–3			2–3
3	(South Sumatra) PS Palembang	3	1	0	2	5	8	−3	3 (Note: Ranked on head-to-head points: PS Palembang 3, Persidi 0.)			1–3		
4	(Aceh) Persidi	3	1	0	2	6	7	−1	3		1–2		2–3	

Source: Liga 4 National Phase
Legend: Blue = home team win; Yellow = draw; Red = away team win.
Rules for classification: 1) Points; 2) Head-to-head points; 3) Head-to-head goal difference; 4) Head-to-head goals scored; 5) Goal difference; 6) Goals scored; 7) Fair-play points; 8) Draw.
Notes:

Group H
Pos	Team	Pld	W	D	L	GF	GA	GD	Pts	Qualification	JOS	PMA	VDR	KOS
1	(West Sumatra) Josal Piaman	3	2	1	0	9	3	+6	7 (Note: Josal Piaman is ahead of Persema in fair-play points with fewer yellow card collections.)	Qualification to the Second round		1–1		5–1
2	(East Java) Persema	3	2	1	0	9	3	+6	7	Qualification to the Second round			3–1	
3	(North Sumatra) Victory Dairi	3	1	0	2	6	9	−3	3		1–3			
4	(Southwest Papua) Persikos	3	0	0	3	5	14	−9	0			1–5	3–4	

Source: Liga 4 National Phase
Legend: Blue = home team win; Yellow = draw; Red = away team win.
Rules for classification: 1) Points; 2) Head-to-head points; 3) Head-to-head goal difference; 4) Head-to-head goals scored; 5) Goal difference; 6) Goals scored; 7) Fair-play points; 8) Draw.
Notes:

Group I
Pos	Team	Pld	W	D	L	GF	GA	GD	Pts	Qualification	NGA	PPP	MFC	SYL
1	(East Java) Persinga (H)	3	3	0	0	7	1	+6	9	Qualification to the Second round		2–1		2–0
2	(West Sumatra) PSPP	3	1	1	1	6	3	+3	4	Qualification to the Second round				4–0
3	(South Sulawesi) Mangiwang	3	1	1	1	4	4	0	4		0–3	1–1		
4	(Central Kalimantan) Sylva Kalteng	3	0	0	3	0	9	−9	0				0–3	

Source: Liga 4 National Phase
Legend: Blue = home team win; Yellow = draw; Red = away team win.
Rules for classification: 1) Points; 2) Head-to-head points; 3) Head-to-head goal difference; 4) Head-to-head goals scored; 5) Goal difference; 6) Goals scored; 7) Fair-play points; 8) Draw.
(H) Hosts

Group J
Pos	Team	Pld	W	D	L	GF	GA	GD	Pts	Qualification	BTV	KAS	INK	PSK
1	(Jakarta) Batavia	3	2	1	0	3	0	+3	7	Qualification to the Second round				2–0
2	(West Java) Persikasi	3	1	1	1	3	3	0	4	Qualification to the Second round	0–1			
3	(East Java) Inter Kediri (H)	3	0	3	0	1	1	0	3		0–0	0–0		
4	(West Java) Pesik	3	0	1	2	3	6	−3	1			2–3	1–1	

Source: Liga 4 National Phase
Legend: Blue = home team win; Yellow = draw; Red = away team win.
Rules for classification: 1) Points; 2) Head-to-head points; 3) Head-to-head goal difference; 4) Head-to-head goals scored; 5) Goal difference; 6) Goals scored; 7) Fair-play points; 8) Draw.
(H) Hosts

Group K
Pos	Team	Pld	W	D	L	GF	GA	GD	Pts	Qualification	ASI	KOB	KMP	KAR
1	(Jakarta) ASIOP	3	2	1	0	3	1	+2	7	Qualification to the Second round		2–1	1–0	
2	(East Java) Persikoba (H)	3	1	1	1	3	3	0	4	Qualification to the Second round			2–1	0–0
3	(South Sumatra) KMP Bumara	3	1	0	2	4	4	0	3					3–1
4	(East Kalimantan) Kartanegara	3	0	2	1	1	3	−2	2		0–0			

Source: Liga 4 National Phase
Legend: Blue = home team win; Yellow = draw; Red = away team win.
Rules for classification: 1) Points; 2) Head-to-head points; 3) Head-to-head goal difference; 4) Head-to-head goals scored; 5) Goal difference; 6) Goals scored; 7) Fair-play points; 8) Draw.
(H) Hosts

Group L
Pos	Team	Pld	W	D	L	GF	GA	GD	Pts	Qualification	MER	SMT	TPN	PAB
1	(South Papua) Persimer	3	2	1	0	8	5	+3	7	Qualification to the Second round			3–3	3–1
2	(East Java) Sang Maestro	3	2	0	1	7	2	+5	6	Qualification to the Second round	1–2			3–0
3	(South Kalimantan) PS Kab. Tapin	3	1	1	1	6	7	−1	4			0–3		
4	(Aceh) PSAB	3	0	0	3	2	9	−7	0				1–3	

Source: Liga 4 National Phase
Legend: Blue = home team win; Yellow = draw; Red = away team win.
Rules for classification: 1) Points; 2) Head-to-head points; 3) Head-to-head goal difference; 4) Head-to-head goals scored; 5) Goal difference; 6) Goals scored; 7) Fair-play points; 8) Draw.

Group M
Pos	Team	Pld	W	D	L	GF	GA	GD	Pts	Qualification	TAL	PBM	KRS	MSU
1	(Gorontalo) Persital	3	2	0	1	8	5	+3	6	Qualification to the Second round			4–0	
2	(West Java) Persikabumi	3	1	1	1	4	4	0	4	Qualification to the Second round	2–3			1–0
3	(Gorontalo) Kreasindo Rajawali Sultan	3	1	1	1	2	5	−3	4			1–1		
4	(East Java) Mitra Surabaya (H)	3	1	0	2	3	3	0	3		3–1		0–1	

Source: Liga 4 National Phase
Legend: Blue = home team win; Yellow = draw; Red = away team win.
Rules for classification: 1) Points; 2) Head-to-head points; 3) Head-to-head goal difference; 4) Head-to-head goals scored; 5) Goal difference; 6) Goals scored; 7) Fair-play points; 8) Draw.
(H) Hosts

Group N
Pos	Team	Pld	W	D	L	GF	GA	GD	Pts	Qualification	PWG	PKU	MWU	CMP
1	(East Java) Persewangi (H)	2	2	0	0	5	1	+4	6	Qualification to the Second round		1–0		
2	(Riau) Pekanbaru	2	0	1	1	1	2	−1	1	Qualification to the Second round			1–1	
3	(West Papua (province)) Manokwari United	2	0	1	1	2	5	−3	1		1–4			
4	(West Java) PS Cimahi Putra (W)	0	0	0	0	0	0	0	0	Withdrew (Note: PS Cimahi Putra withdrew from the competition due to financial problems.)				

Source: Liga 4 National Phase
Legend: Blue = home team win; Yellow = draw; Red = away team win.
Rules for classification: 1) Points; 2) Head-to-head points; 3) Head-to-head goal difference; 4) Head-to-head goals scored; 5) Goal difference; 6) Goals scored; 7) Fair-play points; 8) Draw.
(H) Hosts; (W) Withdrew
Notes:

Group O
Pos	Team	Pld	W	D	L	GF	GA	GD	Pts	Qualification	DEN	PRY	PPU	UHO
1	(Bali) Perseden (H)	3	2	1	0	6	1	+5	7	Qualification to the Second round			1–0	0–0
2	(Aceh) PS Peureulak Raya	3	2	0	1	6	7	−1	6	Qualification to the Second round	1–5		4–2	
3	(West Java) Persipu	3	1	0	2	5	7	−2	3					3–2
4	(Southeast Sulawesi) UHO MZF	3	0	1	2	2	4	−2	1			0–1		

Source: Liga 4 National Phase
Legend: Blue = home team win; Yellow = draw; Red = away team win.
Rules for classification: 1) Points; 2) Head-to-head points; 3) Head-to-head goal difference; 4) Head-to-head goals scored; 5) Goal difference; 6) Goals scored; 7) Fair-play points; 8) Draw.
(H) Hosts

Group P
Pos	Team	Pld	W	D	L	GF	GA	GD	Pts	Qualification	LBT	PGB	PPM	PML
1	(East Nusa Tenggara) Persebata	3	2	1	0	7	5	+2	7	Qualification to the Second round			2–1	4–3
2	(Highland Papua) Persigubin	3	2	1	0	3	1	+2	7	Qualification to the Second round	1–1			
3	(South Kalimantan) Putra Plaosan Martapura	3	1	0	2	5	3	+2	3			0–1		
4	(North Kalimantan) Persemal	3	0	0	3	3	9	−6	0			0–1	0–4	

Source: Liga 4 National Phase
Legend: Blue = home team win; Yellow = draw; Red = away team win.
Rules for classification: 1) Points; 2) Head-to-head points; 3) Head-to-head goal difference; 4) Head-to-head goals scored; 5) Goal difference; 6) Goals scored; 7) Fair-play points; 8) Draw.

=== Second round ===
The 32 teams will be divided into 8 groups of four. The second round will be played in a home tournament format of single round-robin matches.

The top two teams of each group will qualify for the Third round.

Group Q
Pos	Team	Pld	W	D	L	GF	GA	GD	Pts	Qualification	TBR	CEL	PSP	PGF
1	(Bengkulu) Tri Brata Rafflesia	3	2	1	0	9	4	+5	7 (Note: Tri Brata Rafflesia is ahead of Celebest in fair-play points with fewer yellow card collections.)	Qualification to the Third round			4–1	3–1
2	(Central Sulawesi) Celebest	3	2	1	0	9	4	+5	7	Qualification to the Third round	2–2			
3	(Central Java) Persip	3	1	0	2	4	9	−5	3			1–4		2–1
4	(West Papua (province)) Persipegaf	3	0	0	3	3	8	−5	0			1–3		

Source: Liga 4 National Phase
Legend: Blue = home team win; Yellow = draw; Red = away team win.
Rules for classification: 1) Points; 2) Head-to-head points; 3) Head-to-head goal difference; 4) Head-to-head goals scored; 5) Goal difference; 6) Goals scored; 7) Fair-play points; 8) Draw.
Notes:

Group R
Pos	Team	Pld	W	D	L	GF	GA	GD	Pts	Qualification	PBT	PSC	HAR	CMU
1	(Central Java) Persibat	3	2	1	0	5	3	+2	7	Qualification to the Third round			3–2	1–0
2	(Banten) Persic	3	1	2	0	8	4	+4	5	Qualification to the Third round	1–1			6–2
3	(Banten) Harin	3	1	1	1	5	5	0	4			1–1		
4	(West Java) Cimahi United	3	0	0	3	3	9	−6	0				1–2	

Source: Liga 4 National Phase
Legend: Blue = home team win; Yellow = draw; Red = away team win.
Rules for classification: 1) Points; 2) Head-to-head points; 3) Head-to-head goal difference; 4) Head-to-head goals scored; 5) Goal difference; 6) Goals scored; 7) Fair-play points; 8) Draw.

Group S
Pos	Team	Pld	W	D	L	GF	GA	GD	Pts	Qualification	PMA	PMP	PBI	KWA
1	(East Java) Persema	3	2	0	1	10	3	+7	6	Qualification to the Third round				7–0
2	(East Java) PS Mojokerto Putra	3	1	2	0	2	1	+1	5	Qualification to the Third round	2–1		0–0	
3	(Central Java) Persebi (H)	3	1	1	1	5	2	+3	4		1–2			4–0
4	(North Sumatra) PS Kwarta	3	0	1	2	0	11	−11	1			0–0		

Source: Liga 4 National Phase
Legend: Blue = home team win; Yellow = draw; Red = away team win.
Rules for classification: 1) Points; 2) Head-to-head points; 3) Head-to-head goal difference; 4) Head-to-head goals scored; 5) Goal difference; 6) Goals scored; 7) Fair-play points; 8) Draw.
(H) Hosts

Group T
Pos	Team	Pld	W	D	L	GF	GA	GD	Pts	Qualification	PKA	PTR	JOS	BTA
1	(Central Java) Persika Karanganyar (H)	3	3	0	0	12	0	+12	9	Qualification to the Third round		4–0		7–0
2	(Jakarta) Persitara	3	1	0	2	5	8	−3	3 (Note: Tied on head-to-head points. Ranked on head-to-head goal difference: Persitara +1, Josal Piaman 0, Bintang Timur Atambua –1.)	Qualification to the Third round			4–2	
3	(West Sumatra) Josal Piaman	3	1	0	2	6	7	−1	3		0–1			4–2
4	(East Nusa Tenggara) Bintang Timur Atambua	3	1	0	2	4	12	−8	3			2–1		

Source: Liga 4 National Phase
Legend: Blue = home team win; Yellow = draw; Red = away team win.
Rules for classification: 1) Points; 2) Head-to-head points; 3) Head-to-head goal difference; 4) Head-to-head goals scored; 5) Goal difference; 6) Goals scored; 7) Fair-play points; 8) Draw.
(H) Hosts
Notes:

Group U
Pos	Team	Pld	W	D	L	GF	GA	GD	Pts	Qualification	SMT	NGA	ASI	KAS
1	(East Java) Sang Maestro	3	1	2	0	5	3	+2	5	Qualification to the Third round				2–0
2	(East Java) Persinga (H)	3	1	2	0	5	4	+1	5	Qualification to the Third round	2–2			1–1
3	(Jakarta) ASIOP	3	0	2	1	3	4	−1	2		1–1	1–2		
4	(West Java) Persikasi	3	0	2	1	2	4	−2	2				1–1	

Source: Liga 4 National Phase
Legend: Blue = home team win; Yellow = draw; Red = away team win.
Rules for classification: 1) Points; 2) Head-to-head points; 3) Head-to-head goal difference; 4) Head-to-head goals scored; 5) Goal difference; 6) Goals scored; 7) Fair-play points; 8) Draw.
(H) Hosts

Group V
Pos	Team	Pld	W	D	L	GF	GA	GD	Pts	Qualification	BTV	KOB	PPP	MER
1	(Jakarta) Batavia	3	2	0	1	8	5	+3	6 (Note: Ranked on head-to-head points: Batavia 3, Persikoba 0.)	Qualification to the Third round		4–1	0–3	
2	(East Java) Persikoba	3	2	0	1	7	6	+1	6	Qualification to the Third round			4–1	
3	(West Sumatra) PSPP	3	1	1	1	4	4	0	4					0–0
4	(South Papua) Persimer	3	0	1	2	2	6	−4	1		1–4	1–2		

Source: Liga 4 National Phase
Legend: Blue = home team win; Yellow = draw; Red = away team win.
Rules for classification: 1) Points; 2) Head-to-head points; 3) Head-to-head goal difference; 4) Head-to-head goals scored; 5) Goal difference; 6) Goals scored; 7) Fair-play points; 8) Draw.
Notes:

Group W
Pos	Team	Pld	W	D	L	GF	GA	GD	Pts	Qualification	DEN	PKU	PGB	TAL
1	(Bali) Perseden (H)	3	2	1	0	6	1	+5	7	Qualification to the Third round			1–1	3–0
2	(Riau) Pekanbaru	3	2	0	1	6	2	+4	6	Qualification to the Third round	0–2			
3	(Highland Papua) Persigubin	3	1	1	1	3	2	+1	4			0–1		
4	(Gorontalo) Persital	3	0	0	3	0	10	−10	0			0–5	0–2	

Source: Liga 4 National Phase
Legend: Blue = home team win; Yellow = draw; Red = away team win.
Rules for classification: 1) Points; 2) Head-to-head points; 3) Head-to-head goal difference; 4) Head-to-head goals scored; 5) Goal difference; 6) Goals scored; 7) Fair-play points; 8) Draw.
(H) Hosts

Group X
Pos	Team	Pld	W	D	L	GF	GA	GD	Pts	Qualification	LBT	PWG	PRY	PBM
1	(East Nusa Tenggara) Persebata	3	2	1	0	5	1	+4	7	Qualification to the Third round		2–0	1–1	
2	(East Java) Persewangi	3	2	0	1	8	5	+3	6	Qualification to the Third round			4–1	4–2
3	(Aceh) PS Peureulak Raya	3	1	1	1	6	7	−1	4					4–2
4	(West Java) Persikabumi	3	0	0	3	4	10	−6	0		0–2			

Source: Liga 4 National Phase
Legend: Blue = home team win; Yellow = draw; Red = away team win.
Rules for classification: 1) Points; 2) Head-to-head points; 3) Head-to-head goal difference; 4) Head-to-head goals scored; 5) Goal difference; 6) Goals scored; 7) Fair-play points; 8) Draw.

=== Third round ===
The 16 teams will be drawn into 4 groups of four. The third round will be played in a home tournament format of single round-robin matches.

The top two teams of each group will qualify for the Fourth round and promoted to 2025–26 Liga Nusantara

Group A
Pos	Team	Pld	W	D	L	GF	GA	GD	Pts	Promotion or qualification	PTR	BTV	PMP	PBT
1	(Jakarta) Persitara (P)	3	2	0	1	2	2	0	6	Promotion to the 2025–26 Liga Nusantara and qualification to the Fourth round			1–0	1–0
2	(Jakarta) Batavia (P)	3	1	2	0	6	4	+2	5	Promotion to the 2025–26 Liga Nusantara and qualification to the Fourth round	2–0			
3	(East Java) PS Mojokerto Putra	3	1	1	1	5	5	0	4			3–3		
4	(Central Java) Persibat	3	0	1	2	2	4	−2	1			1–1	1–2	

Source: Liga 4 National Phase
Legend: Blue = home team win; Yellow = draw; Red = away team win.
Rules for classification: 1) Points; 2) Head-to-head points; 3) Head-to-head goal difference; 4) Head-to-head goals scored; 5) Goal difference; 6) Goals scored; 7) Fair-play points; 8) Draw.
(P) Promoted

Group B
Pos	Team	Pld	W	D	L	GF	GA	GD	Pts	Promotion or qualification	PKA	LBT	PSC	PWG
1	(Central Java) Persika Karanganyar (P)	3	1	2	0	5	2	+3	5 (Note: Tied on head-to-head points and head-to-head goal difference. Ranked on head-to-head goals scored: Persika Karanganyar 1, Persebata 1, Persic 0.)	Promotion to the 2025–26 Liga Nusantara and qualification to the Fourth round		1–1		4–1
2	(East Nusa Tenggara) Persebata (P)	3	1	2	0	3	1	+2	5	Promotion to the 2025–26 Liga Nusantara and qualification to the Fourth round			0–0	
3	(Banten) Persic	3	1	2	0	4	2	+2	5		0–0			4–2
4	(East Java) Persewangi	3	0	0	3	3	10	−7	0			0–2		

Source: Liga 4 National Phase
Legend: Blue = home team win; Yellow = draw; Red = away team win.
Rules for classification: 1) Points; 2) Head-to-head points; 3) Head-to-head goal difference; 4) Head-to-head goals scored; 5) Goal difference; 6) Goals scored; 7) Fair-play points; 8) Draw.
(P) Promoted
Notes:

Group C
Pos	Team	Pld	W	D	L	GF	GA	GD	Pts	Promotion or qualification	TBR	SMT	NGA	CEL
1	(Bengkulu) Tri Brata Rafflesia (P)	3	2	0	1	4	3	+1	6	Promotion to the 2025–26 Liga Nusantara and qualification to the Fourth round			2–1	
2	(East Java) Sang Maestro (P)	3	1	2	0	2	1	+1	5	Promotion to the 2025–26 Liga Nusantara and qualification to the Fourth round	1–0			1–1
3	(East Java) Persinga	3	1	1	1	2	2	0	4			0–0		1–0
4	(Central Sulawesi) Celebest	3	0	1	2	2	4	−2	1		1–2			

Source: Liga 4 National Phase
Legend: Blue = home team win; Yellow = draw; Red = away team win.
Rules for classification: 1) Points; 2) Head-to-head points; 3) Head-to-head goal difference; 4) Head-to-head goals scored; 5) Goal difference; 6) Goals scored; 7) Fair-play points; 8) Draw.
(P) Promoted

Group D
Pos	Team	Pld	W	D	L	GF	GA	GD	Pts	Promotion or qualification	PKU	DEN	KOB	PMA
1	(Riau) Pekanbaru (P)	3	2	1	0	5	0	+5	7	Promotion to the 2025–26 Liga Nusantara and qualification to the Fourth round		2–0	0–0	
2	(Bali) Perseden (P)	3	2	0	1	3	3	0	6	Promotion to the 2025–26 Liga Nusantara and qualification to the Fourth round			1–0	2–1
3	(East Java) Persikoba	3	1	1	1	2	1	+1	4					2–0
4	(East Java) Persema	3	0	0	3	1	7	−6	0		0–3			

Source: Liga 4 National Phase
Legend: Blue = home team win; Yellow = draw; Red = away team win.
Rules for classification: 1) Points; 2) Head-to-head points; 3) Head-to-head goal difference; 4) Head-to-head goals scored; 5) Goal difference; 6) Goals scored; 7) Fair-play points; 8) Draw.
(P) Promoted

=== Fourth round ===
The 8 teams will be drawn into two groups of four. The fourth round will be played in a home tournament format of single round-robin matches.

The winner of each group will qualify for the Final.

Group A
Pos	Team	Pld	W	D	L	GF	GA	GD	Pts	Qualification	TBR	LBT	DEN	PTR
1	(Bengkulu) Tri Brata Rafflesia	3	1	2	0	5	2	+3	5	Qualification to the Final			1–1	3–0
2	(East Nusa Tenggara) Persebata	3	0	3	0	4	4	0	3		1–1			
3	(Bali) Perseden	3	0	3	0	3	3	0	3			1–1		
4	(Jakarta) Persitara	3	0	2	1	3	6	−3	2			2–2	1–1	

Source: Liga 4 National Phase
Legend: Blue = home team win; Yellow = draw; Red = away team win.
Rules for classification: 1) Points; 2) Head-to-head points; 3) Head-to-head goal difference; 4) Head-to-head goals scored; 5) Goal difference; 6) Goals scored; 7) Fair-play points; 8) Draw.

Group B
Pos	Team	Pld	W	D	L	GF	GA	GD	Pts	Qualification	PKA	PKU	BTV	SMT
1	(Central Java) Persika Karanganyar	3	3	0	0	7	3	+4	9	Qualification to the Final				3–1
2	(Riau) Pekanbaru	3	1	0	2	6	6	0	3 (Note: Tied on head-to-head points. Ranked on head-to-head goal difference: Pekanbaru +1, Batavia +1, Sang Maestro –2.)		1–2			
3	(Jakarta) Batavia	3	1	0	2	4	4	0	3		1–2	3–1		
4	(East Java) Sang Maestro	3	1	0	2	3	7	−4	3			1–4	1–0	

Source: Liga 4 National Phase
Legend: Blue = home team win; Yellow = draw; Red = away team win.
Rules for classification: 1) Points; 2) Head-to-head points; 3) Head-to-head goal difference; 4) Head-to-head goals scored; 5) Goal difference; 6) Goals scored; 7) Fair-play points; 8) Draw.

=== Final ===
The final will be played as a single match. If tied after regulation time, extra time and, if necessary, a penalty shoot-out will be used to decide the winning team.

27 May 2025
15:00 UTC+7

Persika Karanganyar (Central Java)	2–3	(Bengkulu) Tri Brata Rafflesia
Fauzan 44' (pen.); Mubarak 85'	Report	12', 18' Iqbal; 71' Jaenuar

Manahan Stadium, Surakarta
Referee: Yeni Krisdianto

== Season statistics ==
=== Top goalscorers ===
Rank	Player	Team	Goals
1	(Indonesia) Rizqi Fauzan	(Central Java) Persika Karanganyar	14
2	(Indonesia) Ariesta Renaldo	(Bengkulu) Tri Brata Rafflesia	10
3	(Indonesia) Yusuf Effendi	(East Java) Persewangi Banyuwangi	8
3	(Indonesia) Khoirul Anam	(Central Java) Persika Karanganyar	8
3	(Indonesia) Yahya Kardinando	(Bengkulu) Tri Brata Rafflesia	8
6	(Indonesia) Kadek Yoga	(Bali) Perseden Denpasar	7
6	(Indonesia) Peri Maulana	(Banten) Persic Cilegon	7
6	(Indonesia) Khaiz Rayan	(Central Java) Persika Karanganyar	7
6	(Indonesia) Muhammad Ubaid	(East Java) Sang Maestro	7

=== Performance by province ===
The following table represents the performance of each provincial league based on the number of representatives remaining in each round of the national phase.

No	Provincial leagues	Number of representatives				
No	Provincial leagues	R1	R2	R3	R4	F
1	Central Java	4	4	2	1	**1**
2	Bengkulu	1	1	1	1	**1**
3	Jakarta	3	3	2	**2**	
4	East Java	**8**	**6**	**6**	1	
5	East Nusa Tenggara	3	2	1	1	
6	Riau	2	1	1	1	
7	Bali	1	1	1	1	
8	Banten	2	2	1		
9	Central Sulawesi	1	1	1		
10	West Java	6	3			
11	West Sumatra	2	2			
12	Aceh	3	1			
13	Gorontalo	2	1			
14	North Sumatra	2	1			
15	(West Papua (province)) West Papua	2	1			
16	Highland Papua	1	1			
17	South Papua	1	1			
18	South Kalimantan	2				
19	South Sulawesi	2				
20	South Sumatra	2				
21	Bangka Belitung Islands	1				
22	Central Kalimantan	1				
23	Central Papua	1				
24	East Kalimantan	1				
25	Jambi	1				
26	Lampung	1				
27	North Kalimantan	1				
28	North Sulawesi	1				
29	Southeast Sulawesi	1				
30	Southwest Papua	1				
31	West Kalimantan	1				
32	West Nusa Tenggara	1				
33	West Sulawesi	1				
34	(Special Region of Yogyakarta) Yogyakarta	1				
35	(Maluku (province)) Maluku					
36	North Maluku					
37	(Papua (province)) Papua					
38	Riau Islands					
Total		64	32	16	8	2

Notes:

- BOLD: Bold indicates the province with the highest number of representatives in each round.
- Gold background denotes provinces whose representatives are promoted to the 2025–26 Liga Nusantara.

== Awards ==
Award	Winner	Club	Ref.
Best Player	(Indonesia) Iqbal Tri Saputra	Tri Brata Rafflesia	
Best Young Player	(Indonesia) Dedy Jaenuar	Tri Brata Rafflesia	
Top Scorer	(Indonesia) Rizqi Fauzan	Persika Karanganyar	
Fair Play Team	Pekanbaru		

== See also ==
- 2024–25 Liga 1
- 2024–25 Liga 2
- 2024–25 Liga Nusantara
