= Persada Southwest Sumba =

Indonesian football club

Persada
- Full name: Persatuan Sepakbola Sumba Barat Daya
- Nickname: Laskar Ndara Marapu
- Founded: 2007; 19 years ago
- Ground: Galatama Field; Tambolaka, Southwest Sumba
- Owner: PSSI Southwest Sumba
- Manager: Yosef de Ornay
- League: Liga 4
Home colours	Away colours

Persatuan Sepakbola Sumba Barat Daya, simply known as Persada, is an Indonesian football club based in Southwest Sumba Regency, East Nusa Tenggara. They currently compete in the Liga 4 East Nusa Tenggara zone.

== Season-by-season records ==
Season(s)	League/Division	Tier	Tms.	Pos.	Piala Indonesia
2016	ISC Liga Nusantara	3	32	eliminated in provincial phase	—
2017					
2018	Liga 3	3	32	unknown	—
2019	Liga 3	3	32	eliminated in provincial phase	—
2020	Liga 3	3	season abandoned		—
2021–22					
2022–23
2023–24
2024–25	Liga 4	4	64	eliminated in provincial phase	—
2025–26	Liga 4	4	64	3rd in Group U, second round	—

== Honours ==
- El Tari Memorial Cup
  - Champions (1): 2011
  - Third-place (1): 2019
