= Persap Alor Pantar =

Indonesian football club

Persap
- Full name: Persatuan Sepakbola Alor Pantar
- Nicknames: Laskar Nusa Kenari; Laskar Seribu Moko
- Ground: Batunirwala Stadium; Kalabahi, Alor, East Nusa Tenggara
- Capacity: 1,000
- Owner: PSSI Alor Regency
- Chairman: Imran Duru
- Manager: Joseph Malaikosa
- Coach: Andro Atapeni
- League: Liga 4
- 2019: Provincial round
Home colours	Away colours

Persatuan Sepakbola Alor Pantar (simply known as Persap) is an Indonesian football club based in Alor Regency, East Nusa Tenggara. They currently compete in the Liga 4 and their homeground is Batunirwala Stadium.

== Players ==
=== Current squad ===
As of 8 November 2025

Note: Flags indicate national team as defined under FIFA eligibility rules; some limited exceptions apply. Players may hold more than one non-FIFA nationality.

No.	Pos.	Nation	Player
—	GK	IDN	Kamarudin H. Tupong
—	GK	IDN	Bastotal Ilmi
—	DF	IDN	Yohanes M.L. Maku
—	DF	IDN	Gundishalvus M. Kehi
—	DF	IDN	Ilham Y. Hasan
—	DF	IDN	Aditya S. Maulana
—	DF	IDN	Budi Wanto Salim
—	DF	IDN	Fadli H. Tanghan
—	DF	IDN	Gerit Martin Buatpada
—	MF	IDN	Ariwibowo Salimin
—	MF	IDN	Nasrudin Sangga Hama

No.	Pos.	Nation	Player
—	MF	IDN	Alalwi Falidath Djawa
—	MF	IDN	Jainal Syukur
—	MF	IDN	Novehn D.M. Maro
—	MF	IDN	Abdilah Dopu
—	MF	IDN	Max Colly Marokang
—	MF	IDN	Zulkarnain Narang
—	FW	IDN	Samuel Y. Nangula
—	FW	IDN	Arifin S. Toda
—	FW	IDN	Rivaldi H.S. Oang
—	FW	IDN	M. Tesar Sara
