= Bintang Timur SoE Generation F.C. =

Bintang Timur Atambua
- Full name: Bintang Timur Atambua Football Club
- Nickname: Laskar Macan Batas
- Short name: BTA
- Founded: 2015; 11 years ago
- Ground: Bintang Timur Football Field; Atambua, Belu Regency, East Nusa Tenggara
- Capacity: 500
- Owner: (Indonesia) Fary Djemy Francis
- Coach: (Indonesia) Lodovikus Lodi Mau
- League: Liga 4
- 2024–25: 1st (East Nusa Tenggara zone); Second round, 4th in Group T (National phase)
Home colours	Away colours

Bintang Timur Atambua Football Club is an Indonesian football club based in Atambua, Belu Regency, East Nusa Tenggara. They currently compete in the Liga 4.

== Players ==
=== Current squad ===
As of 6 November 2025

Note: Flags indicate national team as defined under FIFA eligibility rules; some limited exceptions apply. Players may hold more than one non-FIFA nationality.

No.	Pos.	Nation	Player
—	GK	IDN	Alexander Aprilio
—	GK	IDN	Muhammad Yuda
—	GK	IDN	Rangga Seran
—	DF	IDN	Viter Klau
—	DF	IDN	Yogi Finanta
—	DF	IDN	Rivan Binsasi
—	DF	IDN	Akbar Harahap
—	DF	IDN	Zefri Poring
—	DF	IDN	Risky Lesu
—	DF	IDN	Bruno Hale
—	DF	IDN	Even Manek
—	DF	IDN	Alditio Matavani
—	MF	IDN	Crespo Hale
—	MF	IDN	Firmus Lafu
—	MF	IDN	Ian Atok

No.	Pos.	Nation	Player
—	MF	IDN	Adrin Berek
—	MF	IDN	Dino Lau
—	MF	IDN	Gerardi Bili
—	MF	IDN	Gregorio Silva
—	FW	IDN	Alberto Soares
—	FW	IDN	Andre Da Cruz
—	FW	IDN	Innocensius Ati
—	FW	IDN	Faisal Muzadi
—	FW	IDN	Glens Bili
—	FW	IDN	Qiko
—	FW	IDN	Rian Leto
—	FW	IDN	Marko Araujo
—	FW	IDN	Alfian Lesu
—	FW	IDN	Martino De Araujo
—	FW	IDN	Sandro Alfons

== Notable matches ==
On 22 February 2025, Bintang Timur Atambua played a friendly match against a trial team for the Timor-Leste national football team. The match finished as a draw at 0–0.

== Honours ==
- El Tari Memorial Cup
  - Champion (1): 2025
