= PSN Ngada =

Indonesian football club

- Full name: Perserikatan Sepakbola Ngada
- Nickname: Laskar Jaramasi (Jaramasi Warriors)
- Short name: PSN
- Founded: 1968; 58 years ago
- Ground: Lebijaga Stadium
- Capacity: 5,000
- Owner: Ngada Regency Government
- Manager: Fredy Burah
- Coach: Kletus Marselinus Gabhe
- League: Liga Nusantara
- 2025–26: 1st (East Nusa Tenggara zone); Semi-finalist (promoted)
Home colours	Away colours

Perserikatan Sepakbola Ngada, commonly known as PSN Ngada, is an Indonesian football club based in Bajawa, Ngada, East Nusa Tenggara. They set to competed in the Liga Nusantara from 2026–27 season following their promotion from Liga 4 in 2025–26 season with their homeground is Lebijaga Stadium.

== History ==
PSN Ngada was founded in 1968 on the initiative of local figures and sports activists in Bajawa, Ngada Regency. This club was formed as a unifying forum for youth and a means of developing local football talent. Their nickname, Laskar Jaramasi (Jaramasi Warriors), is taken from the name of the knight who guards Mount Inerie in local folklore, Jaramasi. The word jara means 'horse', and masi is the knight's male name.

== Players ==
=== Current squad ===
As of 24 August 2026

Note: Flags indicate national team as defined under FIFA eligibility rules; some limited exceptions apply. Players may hold more than one non-FIFA nationality.

No. / Pos. / Nation / Player	No. / Pos. / Nation / Player

== Rivalries ==
PSN's main rivalry is with fellow Flores club Perse Ende. Their matches frequently take place in the El Tari Memorial Cup, the most prestigious and largest football tournament in the province of East Nusa Tenggara. Their rivalry features fast-paced, hard-fought play, as well as clashes between players and officials of both clubs and their respective supporters.

PSN's other rivalry is with Perseftim East Flores. While less heated than the Perse rivalry, this match remains fierce and has been a battle of prestige between the two sides since the 1970s.

== Season-by-season records ==
Season	League/Division	Tier	Tms.	Pos.	Piala Indonesia
2004	Second Division	3	40	first round, 6th in Group E	—
2005	Second Division	3	23	first round, 5th in Group III	—
2006	Second Division	3	47	first round	—
2007					
2008–09
2009–10
2010–11
2012
2013
2014
2015
2016	ISC Liga Nusantara	3	32	runner-up	—
2017	Liga 3	3	32	eliminated in provincial phase	—
2018	Liga 3	3	32	second round	—
2019	Liga 3	3	32	first round, 4th in Group F	—
2020	Liga 3	3	season abandoned		—
2021–22					
2022–23	Liga 3	3	season abandoned		—
2023–24	Liga 3	3	80	first round, 3rd in Group H	—
2024–25	Liga 4	4	64	eliminated in provincial phase	—
2025–26	Liga 4	4	64	semi-finalist	—
2026–27	Liga Nusantara	3	24	TBD	—

Champion	Runner-up	Promotion	Relegation

== Honours ==
- ISC Liga Nusantara
  - Runner-up (1): 2016
- El Tari Memorial Cup
  - Champions (9): 1970, 1982, 1986, 1997, 2001, 2003, 2007, 2023, 2025
