= Persekota Koepang =

Indonesian football club

Persekota
- Full name: Persatuan Sepakbola Koepang Kota
- Nicknames: Laskar Abu Nae; Laskar Sonbai
- Founded: 1996; 30 years ago, as PSKK Kupang; 2023; 3 years ago, as Persekota Koepang
- Ground: Oepoi Stadium; Kupang, East Nusa Tenggara
- Capacity: 10,000
- Owner: PSSI Kupang City
- Chairman: Alex Riwu Kaho
- Manager: Wilson Liyanto
- Coach: Adnan Mahing
- League: Liga 4
- 2022: Quarter-final, (East Nusa Tenggara Zone)
Home colours

Persatuan Sepakbola Koepang Kota or Persekota (previously known as PSKK Kupang) is an Indonesian football club based in Kupang, East Nusa Tenggara. They currently compete in the Liga 4 East Nusa Tenggara zone.

== History ==
This club was previously called PSKK and officially changed its name to Persekota Koepang in 2023. Apart from changing their name, they also changed their nickname from Laskar Abu Nae to Laskar Sonbai. According to Persekota management, Wilson Liyanto, the new name refers to the origin of the name Kupang which comes from the name of the king of Koen Pan who was called by the Dutch as Koepan.

== Current squad ==
As of 5 November 2025

Note: Flags indicate national team as defined under FIFA eligibility rules; some limited exceptions apply. Players may hold more than one non-FIFA nationality.

No.	Pos.	Nation	Player
—	GK	IDN	Baptista Ola
—	GK	IDN	Stamford Raga Romi
—	DF	IDN	Resky Kurniawan
—	DF	IDN	Fadam Sanda
—	DF	IDN	Zikri Djalil
—	DF	IDN	Paul Hayon
—	DF	IDN	Karol Lamanepa
—	DF	IDN	Hence
—	DF	IDN	Farhat Fagih
—	DF	IDN	Muhammad Rifky
—	DF	IDN	Yeski Koen
—	MF	IDN	Alsan Sanda

No.	Pos.	Nation	Player
—	MF	IDN	Agung Mone Ke
—	MF	IDN	Juned Putra
—	MF	IDN	Adi Tiran
—	MF	IDN	Rando Liu
—	MF	IDN	Luis Enrique
—	MF	IDN	Adelio Pinto Soares
—	MF	IDN	Diyo Baok
—	FW	IDN	Arki Tanesib
—	FW	IDN	Ronal Wara
—	FW	IDN	Yuzhar
—	FW	IDN	Oscar Ghale
—	FW	IDN	Franco Muda
