= Perserond Rote Ndao =

Indonesian football club

Perserond
- Full name: Persatuan Sepakbola Rote Ndao
- Nicknames: Laskar Ti'i Langga; Laskar Bumi Ita Esa
- Founded: 2002; 24 years ago
- Ground: Christian Nehemia Dillak Stadium, Rote Ndao, East Nusa Tenggara
- Capacity: 1,500
- Owner: Rote Ndao Government
- Manager: Joni Adu
- Coach: Dedi Seme
- League: Liga 4
- 2023: Semi-finals, (East Nusa Tenggara Zone)
Home colours	Away colours

Persatuan Sepakbola Rote Ndao, simply known as Perserond, is an Indonesian football club based in Christian Nehemia Dillak Stadium, Rote Ndao Regency, East Nusa Tenggara. They currently competed in the Liga 4.
