= Persim Manggarai =

Association football team in Indonesia

- Full name: Persatuan Sepakbola Indonesia Manggarai
- Nickname: Laskar Motang Rua
- Founded: 1958; 68 years ago
- Ground: Golo Dukal Stadium; Manggarai, East Nusa Tenggara
- Owner: Manggarai Regency Government
- Manager: Heri Ngabut
- Coach: Agus Tandur
- League: Liga 4
- 2022: 3rd, (East Nusa Tenggara zone)
Home colours	Away colours

Persatuan Sepakbola Indonesia Manggarai (simply known as Persim Manggarai) is an Indonesian football club based in Manggarai Regency, East Nusa Tenggara. They currently compete in the Liga 4.

== Rivalries ==
Persim has a rivalry in the Greater Manggarai derby with Persamba West Manggarai and Persematim East Manggarai. There's also a fierce rivalry with Perse Ende. Featuring heated matches between the two teams every time they meet, especially in the local East Nusa Tenggara football competition, namely the El Tari Memorial Cup.

== Players ==
=== Current squad ===
As of 6 November 2025

Note: Flags indicate national team as defined under FIFA eligibility rules; some limited exceptions apply. Players may hold more than one non-FIFA nationality.

No.	Pos.	Nation	Player
—	GK	IDN	Betrand
—	GK	IDN	Andre
—	DF	IDN	Mustajid
—	DF	IDN	Tyan Akbar
—	DF	IDN	Dandi Banggur
—	DF	IDN	Lopes
—	DF	IDN	Arman
—	DF	IDN	Fandi
—	DF	IDN	Nanto
—	DF	IDN	Karlos
—	MF	IDN	Lian Sidus

No.	Pos.	Nation	Player
—	MF	IDN	Sabry Dunte
—	MF	IDN	Richard
—	MF	IDN	Vino Labur
—	MF	IDN	Reinaldi
—	MF	IDN	Farrel
—	FW	IDN	Oncik Janggur
—	FW	IDN	Roylon
—	FW	IDN	Jefry Utama
—	FW	IDN	Korsin
—	FW	IDN	Devan Leok
—	FW	IDN	Figo
