= Perss Soe =

Indonesian football club

Perss
- Full name: Persatuan Sepakbola Soe
- Nickname: Laskar Wangi Cendana
- Ground: Kobelete Stadium
- Capacity: 1,000
- Owner: PSSI South Central Timor
- Manager: Eduard Markus Lioe
- Coach: Apris Misa
- League: Liga 4
Home colours	Away colours

Persatuan Sepakbola Soe (simply known as Perss) is an Indonesian football club based in Soe, South Central Timor Regency, East Nusa Tenggara. They currently competed in the Liga 4.

== Players ==
As of 7 November 2025

Note: Flags indicate national team as defined under FIFA eligibility rules; some limited exceptions apply. Players may hold more than one non-FIFA nationality.

No.	Pos.	Nation	Player
—	GK	IDN	Yohanis D.F. Maku
—	GK	IDN	Muhamad Rafli
—	DF	IDN	Yosep G.M. Awa
—	DF	IDN	Steven Taheok
—	DF	IDN	Nayamudin
—	DF	IDN	A. Sang Bintang
—	DF	IDN	Philipus K.
—	DF	IDN	Ferdinandus K.
—	DF	IDN	Yudits E. Sabat
—	DF	IDN	Glen Ado Bala
—	MF	IDN	Adhe Tosari
—	MF	IDN	M. Ramadhan

No.	Pos.	Nation	Player
—	MF	IDN	Nyongki S.
—	MF	IDN	Francesco Muda
—	MF	IDN	Azhari P.
—	MF	IDN	M. Syukur
—	MF	IDN	F.A.B. Cawor
—	MF	IDN	Ibnu Rahman
—	FW	IDN	Sadam Afriansyah
—	FW	IDN	Lazarus Sinim
—	FW	IDN	Angga Fafo
—	FW	IDN	Ivan Tristanto
—	FW	IDN	Cesar Making
—	FW	IDN	M. Jalil Usman

== Honours ==
- El Tari Memorial Cup
  - Champion (1): 2000
