= Perse Ende =

Indonesian football club

- Full name: Persatuan Sepakbola Kabupaten Ende
- Nickname: Laskar Kelimutu (Kelimutu Warriors)
- Founded: 1958; 68 years ago
- Ground: Marilonga Stadium, Ende, East Nusa Tenggara
- Capacity: 10,000
- Owner: PSSI Ende Regency
- Manager: Franciscus Taso
- Coach: Ahmad Paijan
- League: Liga 4
- 2023–24: 3rd in Group E, (National)
| Home colours | Away colours |

Persatuan Sepakbola Ende, commonly known as Perse Ende, is an Indonesian football club based in Ende, East Nusa Tenggara. They currently compete in the Liga 4 and their homeground is Marilonga Stadium.

== Rivalries ==
Perse's main rivalry is with fellow Flores club PSN Ngada. Their matches frequently take place in the El Tari Memorial Cup, the most prestigious and largest football tournament in the province of East Nusa Tenggara. Their rivalry features fast-paced, hard-fought play, as well as clashes between players and officials of both clubs and their respective supporters. Another rivalries is with Persami Maumere and Persim Manggarai.

== Honours ==
- El Tari Memorial Cup
  - Champions (3): 1999, 2017, 2022
