= Ende Regency =

Regency in East Nusa Tenggara, Indonesia

Ende Regency Kabupaten Ende
- Regency
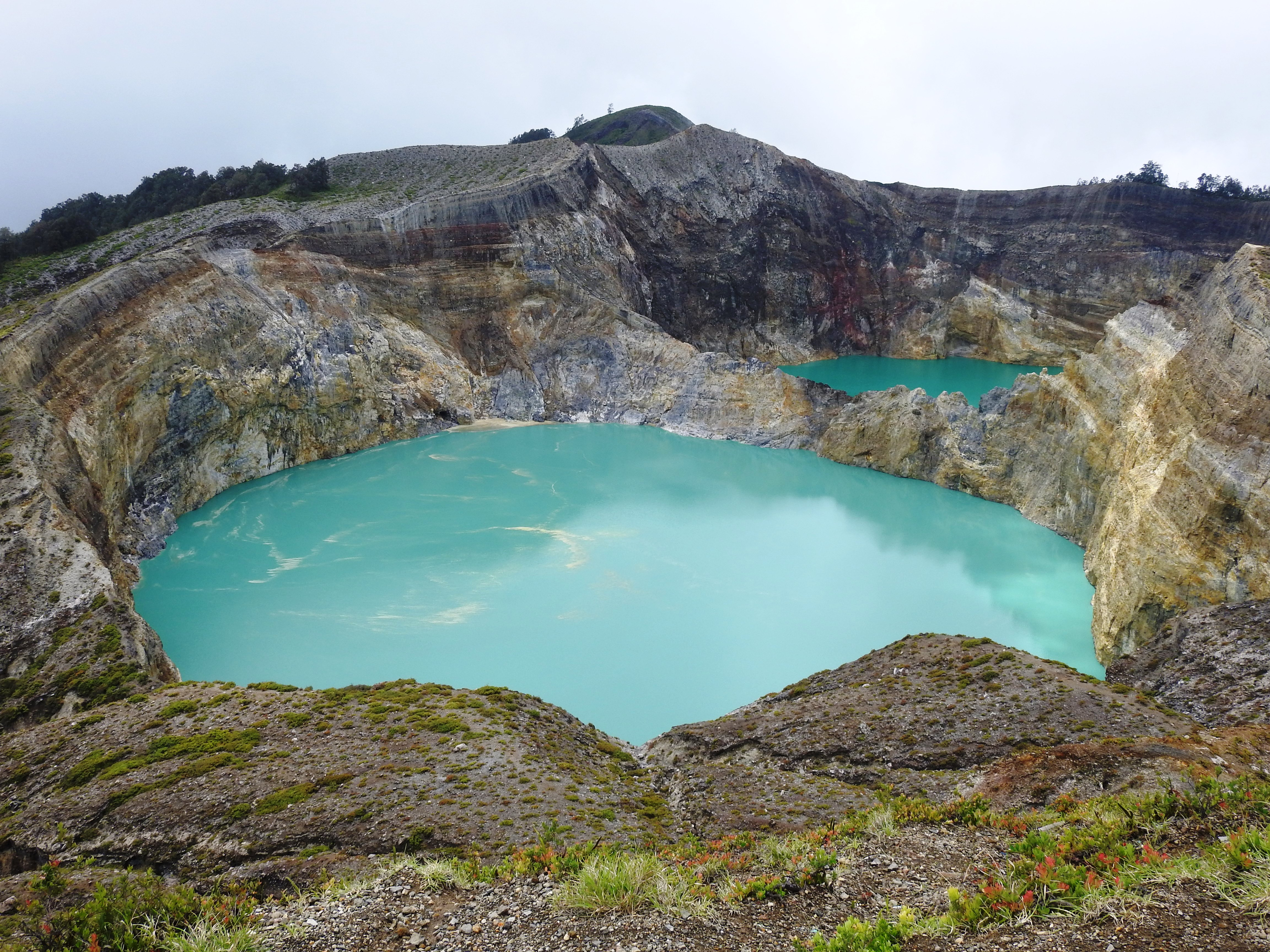
- Kelimutu volcano

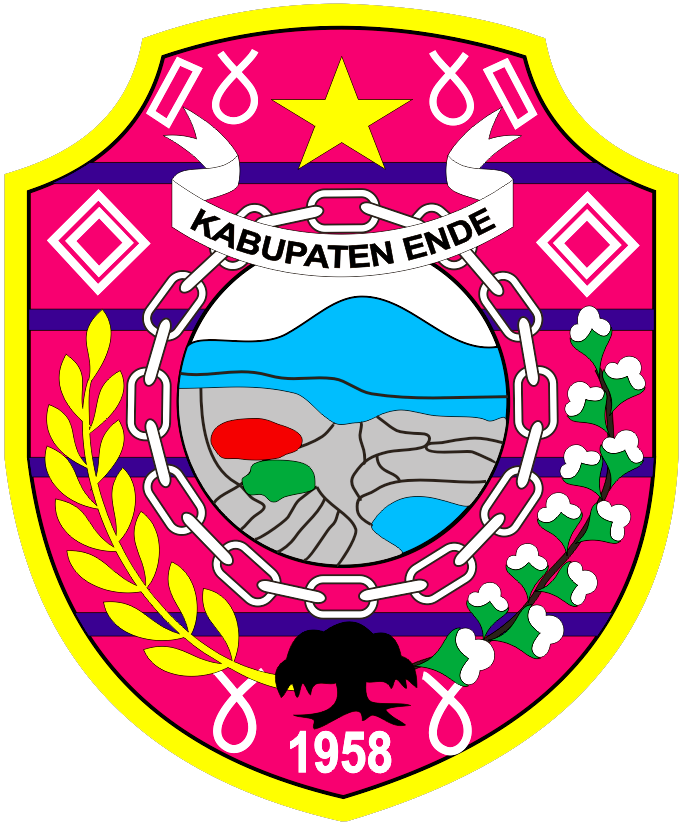
- Coat of arms

- Location within East Nusa Tenggara

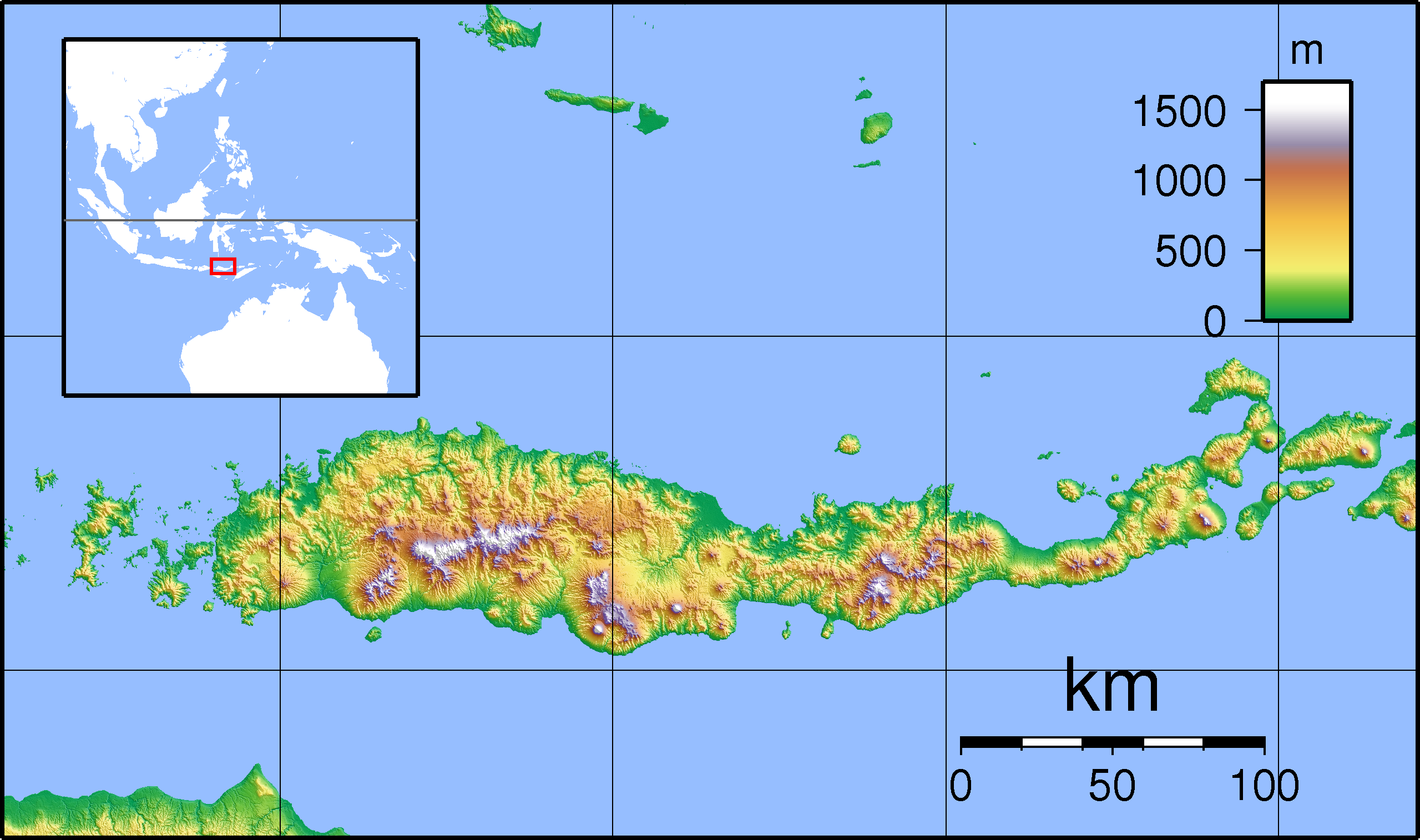
- Location in Flores, Lesser Sunda Islands and Indonesia Ende Regency (Lesser Sunda Islands) Ende Regency (Indonesia)
- Coordinates: 8°50′26″S 121°39′50″E
- Country: Indonesia
- Province: East Nusa Tenggara
- Capital: Ende

Government
  - Regent: Yosef Benediktus Badeoda
  - Vice Regent: Dominikus Minggu Mere

Area
  - Total: 2,085.19 km^{2} (805.10 sq mi)

Population (mid 2025 estimate)
  - Total: 284,165
  - Density: 136.278/km^{2} (352.958/sq mi)
- Time zone: UTC+8 (ICST)
- Area code: (+62) 381
- Website: endekab.go.id

Ende Regency (Ende-Lio: [ɛn.dɛ]) is a regency on the island of Flores, within East Nusa Tenggara Province of Indonesia. The regency covers an area of 2,085.19 km^{2}, and it had a population of 260,605 at the 2010 Census and 270,763 at the 2020 Census; the official estimate as of mid-2025 was 284,165 (comprising 139,390 males and 144,775 females). The western section of the regency (including Ende town itself) is populated by the Ende-speaking people; the larger eastern section is partly inhabited by the Lio-speaking people. The sections have no administrative status. The Regency is bordered to the west by Nagekeo Regency and to the east by Sikka Regency, while the Flores Sea lies to the north and the Savu Sea to the south.

The capital is the town of Ende, which lies on a peninsula on the south coast of the Regency; the town comprises four of the regency's districts, with a combined population of 90,112 as at mid 2025.

The Kelimutu National Park, which contains the well-known tourist attraction of Mount Kelimutu (with a height of 1,640 m.) and the Three-coloured crater lakes, is in Ende Regency.

== Administration ==
The regency is divided into twenty-one districts (kecamatan), tabulated below with their areas and their populations at the 2010 Census and the 2020 Census, together with the official estimates as of mid-2025. The table below groups these into an Ende-speaking west and a largely Lio-speaking east. The table also includes the locations of the district administrative centres, the number of administrative villages in each district (totaling 255 rural desa and 23 urban kelurahan), and its post code.

Kode Wilayah	Name of District (kecamatan)	Area in km^{2}	Pop'n Census 2010	Pop'n Census 2020	Pop'n Estimate mid 2025	Admin centre	No. of villages	Post codes
53.08.01	Nangapanda	190.31	19,842	22,560	24,516	Ndorurea	29 ^{(a)}	86351
53.08.02	Pulau Ende (Ende Island)	10.22	7,754	8,521	9,106	Rendoraterua	9	86362
53.08.11	Maukaro	216.66	6,967	7,683	8,225	Kebirangga	11	86352
53.08.03	Ende	164.99	15,062	17,133	18,618	Rukuramba	32	86319
53.08.04	Ende Selatan (South Ende)	19.57	23,869	25,629	27,084	Tetandara	5 ^{(b)}	86313: 86316
53.08.20	Ende Timur (East Ende)	19.63	19,808	19,500	19,910	Rewarangga; Selatan	6 ^{(c)}	86317, 86319 & 86362
53.08.19	Ende Tengah (Central Ende)	5.75	27,942	23,854	24,355	Paupire	4 ^{(d)}	86312, 86318 & 86319
53.08.18	Ende Utara (North Ende)	17.52	18,100	18,286	18,763	Kotaraja	10 ^{(e)}	86310
Sub-totals for	Western Sector	644.65	139,344	143,166	150,577		106	
53.08.05	Ndona	93.52	12,392	13,690	14,668	Nanganesa	14 ^{(f)}	86360
53.08.16	Ndona Timur (East Ndona)	52.84	5,062	5,045	5,151	Sokoria	7	86363
53.08.08	Wolowaru	64.53	16,051	16,327	16,808	Bokasape	17 ^{(g)}	86373
53.08.09	Wolojita	39.77	6,200	6,266	6,431	Wolojita	6 ^{(h)}	86382
53.08.12	Lio Timur (East Lio)	53.93	7,233	7,891	8,404	Watuneso	13 ^{(j)}	86361
53.08.14	Kelimutu	54.03	7,604	6,992	7,396	Koanara	9	86318
53.08.17	Ndori	26.71	5,128	5,714	6,148	Maubasa	10	86362
53.08.10	Maurole	155.14	11,396	11,605	11,954	Maurole	13	86381
53.08.13	Kotabaru	199.70	12,606	10,407	10,792	Kotabaru	13	86111
53.08.15	Detukeli	112.29	6,787	6,745	7,091	Kebesani	13	86371
53.08.21	Lepembuso; Kelisoke ^{(k)}	150.88	^{(m)}	5,366	5,503	Nggumbelaka	14	86374: 86379
53.08.06	Detusoko	144.27	13,320	14,125	14,972	Detusoko	21 ^{(n)}	86370
53.08.07	Wewaria	292.94	16,492	17,424	18,270	Welamosa	22	86353
Sub-totals for	Eastern Sector	1,440.54	121,261	127,597	133,588		172	
Totals for	Regency	2,085.19	260,605	270,763	284,165	Ende town	278	

Note: (a) including the kelurahan of Ndorurea. (b) comprising the five kelurahan of Mbongawani, Paupanda, Rukunlima, Tanjung and Tetandara.
(c) comprising three kelurahan (Mautapaga, Rewarangga and Rewarangga Selatan) and three desa. (d) comprising four kelurahan - Kelimutu, Onekore, Paupire and Potulando.
(e) comprising four kelurahan (Kota Raja, Kota Ratu, Roworena and Roworena Barat) and six desa. (f) comprising two kelurahan (Wolotopo and Wolotolo Timur) and twelve desa.
(g) including the kelurahan of Bokasape. (h) including the kelurahan of Wolojita. (j) including the kelurahan of Wolosambi.
(k) a new district created since 2010 by splitting of existing neighbouring districts.
(m) the 2010 Census population of the new Lepembuso Kelisoke District is included with the figure for the districts from which it was split. (n) including the kelurahan of Detusoko.

== Economy ==
Historically, copra has been a major exported good from Ende, with the highest production in coastal areas surrounding the main town. The dry coastal areas were not suitable for the planting of rice or food crops, and hence coconut trees became an agricultural mainstay. The industry has however languished since the 1990s due to competition from palm oil plantations elsewhere in the country. Other significant agricultural products include rice and coffee.

== Notable people ==
- Donatus Djagom, archbishop of the Archdiocese of Ende
