= Perseftim East Flores =

Indonesian football club

Perseftim
- Full name: Persatuan Sepakbola Flores Timur
- Nickname: Laskar Lewotana
- Founded: 1968; 58 years ago
- Ground: Ile Mandiri Stadium; Larantuka, East Flores
- Capacity: 5,000
- Owner: PSSI East Flores Regency
- Chairman: Yohanis Kopong
- Coach: Ignasius Hendrikus Sei Halan
- League: Liga 4
- 2024–25: 3rd (East Nusa Tenggara zone); First round, 3rd in Group B (National phase)
Home colours	Away colours

Persatuan Sepakbola Flores Timur (simply known as Perseftim) is an Indonesian football club based in East Flores Regency, East Nusa Tenggara. They currently competes in Liga 4 East Nusa Tenggara zone.

== Honours ==
- El Tari Memorial Cup
  - Champions (5): 1968, 1969, 1974, 1978, 2009
  - Third-place (1): 2025
