= List of regencies and cities in Lampung =

This is a list of regencies and cities in Lampung province. As of March 2026, there were 13 regencies and 2 cities.

| # | Regency/ City | Capital | Regent/ Mayor | Area (km^{2}) | Population (2019) | District | Kelurahan (urban village)/ Desa (village) | Logo | Location map |
|---|---|---|---|---|---|---|---|---|---|
| 1 | Lampung Barat Regency | Liwa | Parosil Mabsus | 2.142,78 | 304.197 | 15 | 5/131 | | |
| 2 | Lampung Selatan Regency | Kalianda | Nanang Ermanto | 700,32 | 1.042.754 | 17 | 4/256 | | |
| 3 | Lampung Tengah Regency | Gunung Sugih | Loekman Djoyosoemarto | 3.802,68 | 1.474.704 | 28 | 10/301 | | |
| 4 | Lampung Timur Regency | Sukadana | Zaiful Bokhari | 5.325,03 | 1.120.998 | 24 | -/264 | | |
| 5 | Lampung Utara Regency | Kotabumi | Budi Utomo) | 2.725,87 | 616.744 | 23 | 15/232 | | |
| 6 | Mesuji Regency | Mesuji | Saply TH | 2.184,00 | 231.816 | 7 | -/105 | | |
| 7 | Pesawaran Regency | Gedong Tataan | Dendi Ramadhona | 2.243,51 | 550.272 | 11 | -/144 | | |
| 8 | Pesisir Barat Regency | Krui | Agus Istiqlal | 2.907,23 | 159.544 | 11 | 2/116 | | |
| 9 | Pringsewu Regency | Pringsewu | Sujadi Saddat | 625,00 | 423.257 | 9 | 5/126 | | |
| 10 | Tanggamus Regency | Kota Agung | Dewi Handajani | 3.020,64 | 645.679 | 20 | 3/299 | | |
| 11 | Tulang Bawang Regency | Menggala | Winarti | 3.466,32 | 423.401 | 15 | 4/147 | | |
| 12 | Tulang Bawang Barat Regency | Tulang Bawang Tengah | Umar Ahmad | 1.201,00 | 273.724 | 9 | 3/93 | | |
| 13 | Way Kanan Regency | Blambangan Umpu | Raden Adipati Surya | 3.921,63 | 478.604 | 14 | 6/221 | | |
| 14 | Bandar Lampung | - | Eva Dwiana | 296,00 | 1.180.884 | 20 | 126/- | | |
| 15 | Metro | - | A. Pairin | 61,79 | 169.013 | 5 | 22/- | | |
