= 2025–26 Liga 4 Lampung =

Liga 4 Lampung
- Season: 2025–26
- Dates: 25 January – 13 February 2026
- Champions: Tanggamus Farmers Angonsaka (1st title)
- National phase: Tanggamus Farmers Angonsaka

The 2025–26 Liga 4 Lampung will be the second season of Liga 4 Lampung after the change in the structure of Indonesian football competition and serves as a qualifying round for the national phase of the 2025–26 Liga 4.

Persikomet are the defending champions.

== Teams ==
A total of 10 teams are competing in this season.

No	Team	Location	2024–25 season
1	Mesuji	Mesuji Regency	—
2	Great Giant Family	Central Lampung Regency	Semi-finalist^{1}
3	Tanggamus Farmers Angonsaka	Tanggamus Regency	—
4	Perseti	Metro City	—
5	Bandar Lampung	Bandar Lampung City	First round (3rd in Group B)
6	Bintang Utara Pratama	Bandar Lampung City	—
7	SS Lampung	Bandar Lampung City	—
8	TS Saiburai	Bandar Lampung City	Runner-up
9	Trisula Raya	East Lampung Regency	First round (4th in Group B)
10	Oosthaven Putra Lampung	South Lampung Regency	—

Notes:

1. as GGF Persilat

== Group stage ==
The draw for the group stage took place in January 2026. The 10 teams will be drawn into 2 groups of four or five. The preliminary round will be played in single round-robin matches.

The top two teams of each group will qualify for the knockout stage.

=== Group A ===
All matches will be held at Pahoman Stadium, Bandar Lampung.

Pos	Team	Pld	W	D	L	GF	GA	GD	Pts	Qualification
1	Tanggamus Farmers Angonsaka	4	4	0	0	20	1	+19	12	Qualification to the Knockout stage
2	Bandar Lampung	4	3	0	1	9	11	−2	9	Qualification to the Knockout stage
3	Oosthaven Putra Lampung	4	2	0	2	9	6	+3	6	
4	SS Lampung	4	0	1	3	5	14	−9	1	
5	Perseti	4	0	1	3	4	15	−11	1	

Source: Liga 4 Lampung
Rules for classification: 1) Points; 2) Head-to-head points; 3) Head-to-head goal difference; 4) Head-to-head goals scored; 5) Goal difference; 6) Goals scored; 7) Fair-play points; 8) Draw.

=== Group B ===
All matches will be held at Pahoman Stadium, Bandar Lampung.

Pos	Team	Pld	W	D	L	GF	GA	GD	Pts	Qualification
1	TS Saiburai	4	4	0	0	33	0	+33	12	Qualification to the Knockout stage
2	Mesuji	4	3	0	1	12	2	+10	9	Qualification to the Knockout stage
3	Trisula Raya	4	1	1	2	5	14	−9	4	
4	Bintang Utara Pratama	4	0	2	2	3	23	−20	2	
5	Great Giant Family	4	0	1	3	2	16	−14	1	

Source: Liga 4 Lampung
Rules for classification: 1) Points; 2) Head-to-head points; 3) Head-to-head goal difference; 4) Head-to-head goals scored; 5) Goal difference; 6) Goals scored; 7) Fair-play points; 8) Draw.

== Knockout stage ==
The knockout stage will be played as a single match. If tied after regulation time, extra time and, if necessary, a penalty shoot-out will be used to decide the winning team.

=== Bracket ===
Semi-finals
12 February 2026
Tanggamus Farmers Angonsaka	5
Mesuji	1
12 February 2026
TS Saiburai	4
Bandar Lampung	1

Final
13 February 2026
Tanggamus Farmers Angonsaka	1
TS Saiburai	0

=== Semi-finals ===
12 February 2025
13:30 WIB (UTC+7)

Tanggamus Farmers Angonsaka	5–1	Mesuji

Pahoman Stadium, Bandar Lampung
12 February 2025
15:30 WIB (UTC+7)

TS Saiburai	4–1	Bandar Lampung

Pahoman Stadium, Bandar Lampung

=== Final ===
13 February 2025
14:00 WIB (UTC+7)

Tanggamus Farmers Angonsaka	1–0	TS Saiburai

Pahoman Stadium, Bandar Lampung

== See also ==
- 2025–26 Liga 4
