= 2021 Liga 3 Lampung =

Tournament details
- Dates: 1–14 November 2021
- Teams: 14

Final positions
- Champions: AD Sport (2nd title)
- Runners-up: Persikomet Metro

The 2021 Liga 3 Lampung will be the sixth season of Liga 3 Lampung as a qualifying round for the national round of the 2021–22 Liga 3.

AD Sport were the defending champion.

== Teams ==
There are 14 teams participated in the league this season.

Team	Location
AD Sport	Bandar Lampung
Bina Bangsa	Bandar Lampung
Harnas 31 Group	Bandar Lampung
Krui	West Lampung Regency
Lampung United	East Lampung Regency
Persikomet Metro	Metro
Persilamtim East Lampung	East Lampung Regency
Persilas South Lampung	South Lampung Regency
Persituba Tulang Bawang	Tulang Bawang Regency
PS Tanggamus	Tanggamus Regency
Putra Way Kanan	Way Kanan Regency
Putrad PB	Central Lampung Regency
Tanggamus Farmers	Tanggamus Regency
Spektra Trisula	East Lampung Regency

== Group stage ==
=== Group A ===
Pos	Team	Pld	W	D	L	GF	GA	GD	Pts	Qualification
1	Persikomet Metro	3	3	0	0	5	1	+4	9	Advanced to Knockout stage
2	Persilas South Lampung	3	2	0	1	6	2	+4	6	Advanced to Knockout stage
3	Bina Bangsa	3	1	0	2	5	7	−2	3	
4	Lampung United	3	0	0	3	2	8	−6	0	

Source: Liga 3 Lampung 2021

=== Group B ===
Pos	Team	Pld	W	D	L	GF	GA	GD	Pts	Qualification
1	Persilamtim East Lampung	3	3	0	0	11	2	+9	9	Advanced to Knockout stage
2	AD Sport	3	2	0	1	12	1	+11	6	Advanced to Knockout stage
3	Persituba Tulang Bawang	3	1	0	2	4	10	−6	3	
4	Tanggamus Farmers	3	0	0	3	3	17	−14	0	

Source: Liga 3 Lampung 2021

=== Group C ===
Pos	Team	Pld	W	D	L	GF	GA	GD	Pts	Qualification
1	Putrad PB	2	2	0	0	6	1	+5	6	Advanced to Knockout stage
2	Putra Way Kanan	2	1	0	1	1	4	−3	3	Advanced to Knockout stage
3	Spektra Trisula	2	0	0	2	1	3	−2	0	

Source: Liga 3 Lampung 2021

=== Group D ===
Pos	Team	Pld	W	D	L	GF	GA	GD	Pts	Qualification
1	Harnas 31 Group	2	2	0	0	5	1	+4	6	Advanced to Knockout stage
2	PS Tanggamus	2	1	0	1	4	5	−1	3	Advanced to Knockout stage
3	Krui	2	0	0	2	3	6	−3	0	

Source: Liga 3 Lampung 2021

== Knockout stage ==
=== Semi final ===
November 12, 2021

Persikomet Metro	1–0	Persilamtim East Lampung
	Report

Stadion Radin Inten, Kalianda
November 12, 2021

Persilas South Lampung	0–0 (2–4)	AD Sport
	Report

Stadion Radin Inten, Kalianda

(AD Sport FC won 4–2 on penalty shoot-out.)

=== Final ===
November 14, 2021

Persikomet Metro	0–1	AD Sport
	Report

Stadion Radin Inten, Kalianda
