= 2023–24 Liga 3 Lampung =

Tournament details
- Country: Indonesia
- Venue: 1
- Dates: 3 January 2024 – 12 January 2024
- Teams: 6

Final positions
- Champions: TS Saiburai (1st title)
- Runners-up: PSBL
- Qualified for: 2023–24 Liga 3 National phase

Tournament statistics
- Matches played: 9
- Goals scored: 20 (2.22 per match)

The 2023–24 Liga 3 Lampung is the seventh edition of Liga 3 Lampung organized by Asprov PSSI Lampung.

This competition was attended by 6 clubs. The winner of this competition will advance to the national phase.

AD Sport is the defending champion after winning it in the 2021 season.

== Teams ==
2023–24 Liga 3 Lampung was attended by 6 teams.

No.	Team	Location
1	Bandar Lampung	Bandar Lampung City
2	PSBL Bandar Lampung	Bandar Lampung City
3	SS Lampung	Bandar Lampung City
4	TS Saiburai	Bandar Lampung City
5	Persikomet Metro	Metro City
6	Garuda Lampung City	South Lampung Regency

== Venue ==
- Yonif 143/TWEJ Soccer Field, South Lampung Regency.

== First round ==
=== Group A ===
Pos	Team	Pld	W	D	L	GF	GA	GD	Pts	Qualification
1	PSBL	2	1	1	0	3	1	+2	4	Advance to the Knockout Round
2	TS Saiburai	2	1	1	0	2	1	+1	4	Advance to the Knockout Round
3	SS Lampung	2	0	0	2	0	3	−3	0	

Source: 2023–24 Liga 3 Lampung
3 January 2024
15.30 WIB

PSBL	2–0	SS Lampung
	Report

Yonif 143/TWEJ Soccer Field, South Lampung Regency

5 January 2024
15.30 WIB

SS Lampung	0–1	TS Saiburai
	Report

Yonif 143/TWEJ Soccer Field, South Lampung Regency

7 January 2024
15.30 WIB

TS Saiburai	1–1	PSBL
	Report

Yonif 143/TWEJ Soccer Field, South Lampung Regency

=== Group B ===
Pos	Team	Pld	W	D	L	GF	GA	GD	Pts	Qualification
1	Persikomet	2	2	0	0	3	0	+3	6	Advance to the Knockout Round
2	Garuda Lampung City (H)	2	1	0	1	3	1	+2	3	Advance to the Knockout Round
3	Bandar Lampung	2	0	0	2	0	5	−5	0	

Source: 2023–24 Liga 3 Lampung
(H) Hosts
4 January 2024
15.30 WIB

Bandar Lampung	0−3 (w.o.)	Garuda Lampung City
	Report

Yonif 143/TWEJ Soccer Field, South Lampung Regency

Garuda Lampung City were awarded a 3–0 win over Bandar Lampung .

6 January 2024
15.30 WIB

Garuda Lampung City	0−1	Persikomet
	Report

Yonif 143/TWEJ Soccer Field, South Lampung Regency

8 January 2024
15.30 WIB

Persikomet	2–0	Bandar Lampung
	Report

Yonif 143/TWEJ Soccer Field, South Lampung Regency

== Knockout round ==
=== Bracket ===
Semi-finals
10 January 2024 – South Lampung
A1	PSBL	6
B2	Garuda Lampung City	0
10 January 2024 – South Lampung
B1	Persikomet	1 (4)
A2	TS Saiburai (p)	1 (5)

Final
12 January 2024 – South Lampung
PSBL	1
TS Saiburai	3

=== Semi-finals ===
10 January 2024
13.30 WIB

PSBL	6–0	Garuda Lampung City
	Report

Yonif 143/TWEJ Soccer Field, South Lampung Regency

10 January 2024
15.30 WIB

Persikomet	1–1 (a.e.t.)	TS Saiburai
	Report
Penalties
	4–5

Yonif 143/TWEJ Soccer Field, South Lampung Regency

=== Final ===
12 January 2024
15:00 WIB

PSBL	1–3	TS Saiburai
	Report

Yonif 143/TWEJ Soccer Field, South Lampung Regency

== Qualification to the national phase ==
Team	Method of qualification	Date of qualification	Qualified to
TS Saiburai	2023–24 Liga 3 Lampung champions	12 January 2024	2023–24 Liga 3 National Phase

== See also ==
- 2023–24 Liga 3 National phase
