= 2024–25 Liga 4 Lampung =

Liga 4 Lampung
- Season: 2024–25
- Dates: 1–9 February 2025
- Champions: Persikomet (1st title)
- National phase: Persikomet
- Matches: 15
- Goals: 49 (3.27 per match)
- Biggest win: TS Saiburai 9–1 Garuda Lampung City (3 February 2025)
- Highest scoring: TS Saiburai 9–1 Garuda Lampung City (3 February 2025)

The 2024–25 Liga 4 Lampung was the inaugural season of Liga 4 Lampung after the change in the structure of Indonesian football competition and serves as a qualifying round for the national phase of the 2024–25 Liga 4. The competition is organised by the Lampung Provincial PSSI Association.

== Teams ==
=== Participating teams ===
A total of 8 teams are competing in this season.

No	Team	Location	2023–24 season
1	GGF Persilat	Central Lampung Regency	—
2	Persikomet	Metro City	Semi-finalist
3	Trisula	East Lampung Regency	—
4	Garuda Lampung City	South Lampung Regency	Semi-finalist
5	AD Sport	Bandar Lampung City	—
6	Bandar Lampung	Bandar Lampung City	First round (3rd in Group B)
7	Lampung United	Bandar Lampung City	—
8	TS Saiburai	Bandar Lampung City	Champions

=== Personnel and kits ===
Note: Flags indicate national team as has been defined under FIFA eligibility rules. Players and coaches may hold more than one non-FIFA nationality.

Team	Head coach	Captain	Kit manufacturer	Main kit sponsor	Other kit sponsor(s)
GGF Persilat			(Indonesia) LJsport	Sunpride	List: Front: Koperasi Dwi Karya; Back: Hometown Fresh Milk; Sleeves: Great Giant Foods; Shorts: None
Persikomet			(Indonesia) ELTEN	Putra Baru Group	List: Front: Mas Physio, Bakso Tenes El Pra Mit Metro; Back: ELTEN; Sleeves: None; Shorts: None
Trisula				Trisula Raya	List: Front: Back: Sleeves: Shorts:
Garuda Lampung City			(Indonesia) Made by club	Garuda Lampung	List: Front: None; Back: None; Sleeves: None; Shorts: None
AD Sport			(Indonesia) LJsport	LJsport	List: Front: Back: Sleeves: Shorts:
Bandar Lampung	(Indonesia) Diki Rianto		(Indonesia) Wanke	Kawan Kakang	List: Front: Pemuda Muda Berkarya Foundation; Back: Sleeves: Shorts:
Lampung United				YAY	List: Front: Back: Sleeves: Shorts:
TS Saiburai			(Indonesia) LJsport	31 Group	List: Front: None; Back: LJsport; Sleeves: Berita Laskar Saburai; Shorts: None

== Schedule ==
The schedule of the competition is as follows.

Stage	Matchday	Date
Group stage	Matchday 1	1–2 February 2025
Group stage	Matchday 2	3–4 February 2025
Group stage	Matchday 3	5–6 February 2025
Knockout stage	Semi-finals	8 February 2025
Knockout stage	Third place play-off	9 February 2025
Knockout stage	Final	9 February 2025

== Group stage ==
A total of 8 teams will be drawn into two groups of four. The group stage will be played in a home tournament format of single round-robin matches.

The top two teams of each group will qualify for the knockout stage.

=== Group A ===
All matches will be held at Sumpah Pemuda Stadium, Bandar Lampung.

Pos	Team	Pld	W	D	L	GF	GA	GD	Pts	Qualification	TSS	PLT	LUN	GLC
1	TS Saiburai	3	3	0	0	18	2	+16	9	Qualification to the Knockout stage	—	—	—	9–1
2	GGF Persilat	3	1	1	1	2	4	−2	4	Qualification to the Knockout stage	1–4	—	—	1–0
3	Lampung United	3	0	2	1	1	6	−5	2		0–5	0–0	—	—
4	Garuda Lampung City	3	0	1	2	2	11	−9	1		—	—	1–1	—

Source: Liga 4 Lampung
Rules for classification: 1) Points; 2) Head-to-head points; 3) Head-to-head goal difference; 4) Head-to-head goals scored; 5) Goal difference; 6) Goals scored; 7) Fair-play points; 8) Draw.

==== Group A Matches ====
Matchday 1 (1 February 2025)
1 February 2025
13:30 WIB (UTC+7)

Garuda Lampung City	1–1	Lampung United
	Report

Sumpah Pemuda Stadium, Bandar Lampung
1 February 2025
15:30 WIB (UTC+7)

GGF Persilat	1–4	TS Saiburai

Sumpah Pemuda Stadium, Bandar Lampung

Matchday 2 (3 February 2025)
3 February 2025
13:30 WIB (UTC+7)

TS Saiburai	9–1	Garuda Lampung City
	Report

Sumpah Pemuda Stadium, Bandar Lampung
3 February 2025
15:30 WIB (UTC+7)

Lampung United	0–0	GGF Persilat
	Report

Sumpah Pemuda Stadium, Bandar Lampung

Matchday 3 (5 February 2025)
5 February 2025
13:30 WIB (UTC+7)

Lampung United	0–5	TS Saiburai
	Report

Sumpah Pemuda Stadium, Bandar Lampung
5 February 2025
15:30 WIB (UTC+7)

GGF Persilat	1–0	Garuda Lampung City
	Report

Sumpah Pemuda Stadium, Bandar Lampung

=== Group B ===
All matches will be held at Sumpah Pemuda Stadium, Bandar Lampung.

Pos	Team	Pld	W	D	L	GF	GA	GD	Pts	Qualification	MET	ADS	BDL	TRI
1	Persikomet	3	2	1	0	10	0	+10	7	Qualification to the Knockout stage	—	0–0	2–0	—
2	AD Sport	3	2	1	0	3	0	+3	7	Qualification to the Knockout stage	—	—	—	2–0
3	Bandar Lampung	3	1	0	2	4	3	+1	3		—	0–1	—	4–0
4	Trisula	3	0	0	3	0	14	−14	0		0–8	—	—	—

Source: Liga 4 Lampung
Rules for classification: 1) Points; 2) Head-to-head points; 3) Head-to-head goal difference; 4) Head-to-head goals scored; 5) Goal difference; 6) Goals scored; 7) Fair-play points; 8) Draw.

Matchday 1 (2 February 2025)
2 February 2025
13:30 WIB (UTC+7)

Trisula	0–8	Persikomet
	Report

Sumpah Pemuda Stadium, Bandar Lampung
2 February 2025
15:30 WIB (UTC+7)

Bandar Lampung	0–1	AD Sport
	Report

Sumpah Pemuda Stadium, Bandar Lampung

Matchday 2 (4 February 2025)
4 February 2025
13:30 WIB (UTC+7)

AD Sport	2–0	Trisula
	Report

Sumpah Pemuda Stadium, Bandar Lampung
4 February 2025
15:30 WIB (UTC+7)

Persikomet	2–0	Bandar Lampung
	Report

Sumpah Pemuda Stadium, Bandar Lampung

Matchday 3 (6 February 2025)
6 February 2025
13:30 WIB (UTC+7)

Persikomet	0–0	AD Sport
	Report

Sumpah Pemuda Stadium, Bandar Lampung
6 February 2025
15:30 WIB (UTC+7)

Bandar Lampung	4–0	Trisula
	Report

Sumpah Pemuda Stadium, Bandar Lampung

== Knockout stage ==
The knockout stage will be played as a single match. If tied after regulation time, extra time and, if necessary, a penalty shoot-out will be used to decide the winning team.

=== Bracket ===
Semi-finals
8 February 2025 — Bandar Lampung
A1	TS Saiburai (p)	0 (4)
B2	AD Sport	0 (2)
8 February 2025 — Bandar Lampung
B1	Persikomet	4
A2	GGF Persilat	1

Final
9 February 2025 — Bandar Lampung
TS Saiburai	1
Persikomet	2

=== Semi-finals ===
8 February 2025
13:00 WIB (UTC+7)

TS Saiburai	0–0	AD Sport
	Report
Penalties
	4–2

Sumpah Pemuda Stadium, Bandar Lampung

8 February 2025
15:30 WIB (UTC+7)

Persikomet	4–1	GGF Persilat
	Report

Sumpah Pemuda Stadium, Bandar Lampung

=== Final ===
9 February 2025
14:00 WIB (UTC+7)

TS Saiburai	1–2	Persikomet
	Report

Sumpah Pemuda Stadium, Bandar Lampung

== See also ==
- 2024–25 Liga 4
