= Villages of Indonesia =

Administrative division of Indonesia

Map of Indonesia's Villages

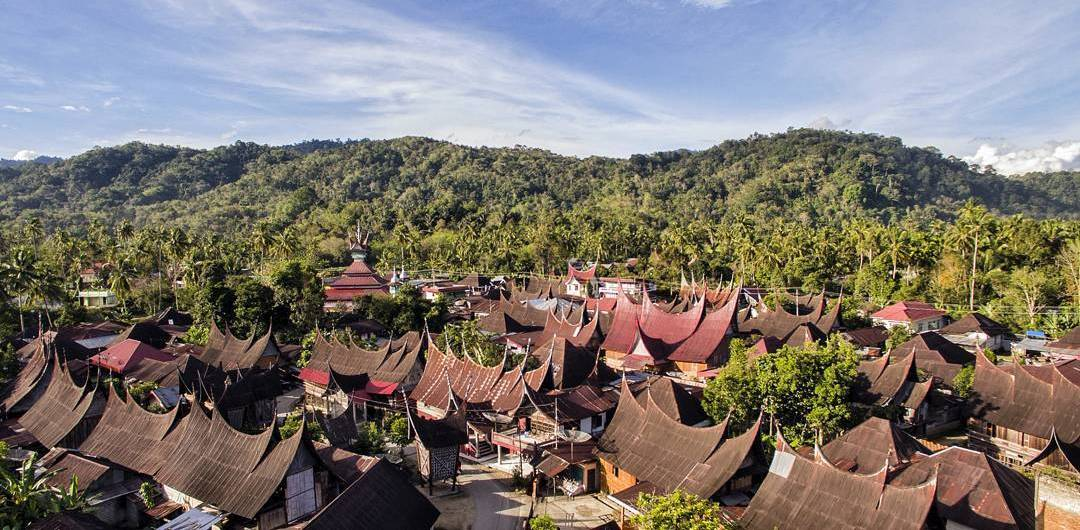
A Thousand Rumah Gadang in West Sumatra, it is one of the traditional villages in Indonesia.

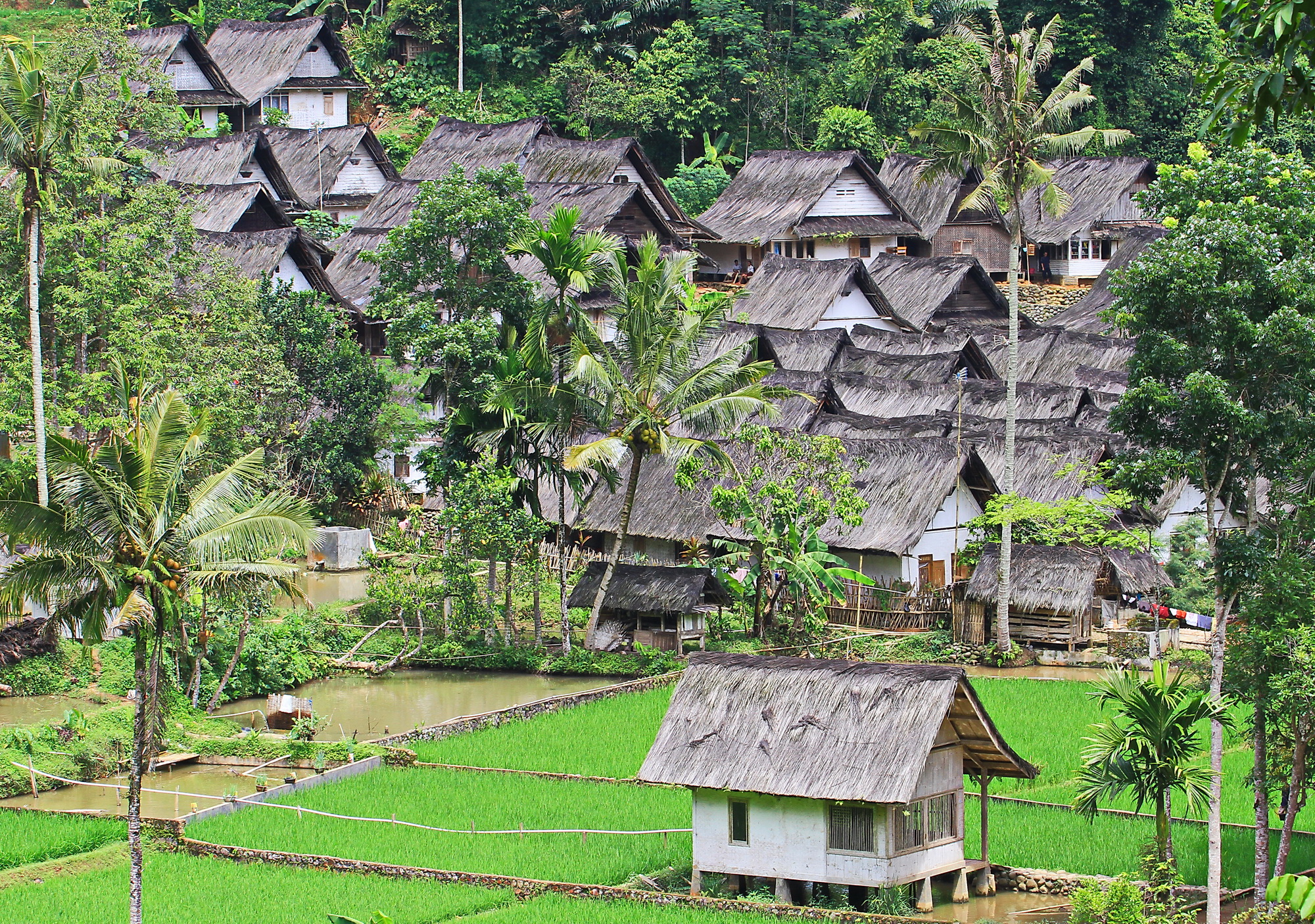
Kampung Naga village in Tasikmalaya, West Java.

In Indonesia, village or subdistrict is the fourth-level subdivision and the smallest administrative division of Indonesia below a district, regency/city, and province. Similar administrative divisions outside of Indonesia include barangays in the Philippines, muban in Thailand, civil townships and incorporated municipalities in the United States and Canada, communes in France and Vietnam, dehestan in Iran, hromada in Ukraine, Gemeinden in Germany, comuni in Italy, or municipios in Spain. The UK equivalent are civil parishes in England and communities in Wales. There are a number of names and types for villages in Indonesia, with desa (rural village) being the most frequently used for regencies, and kelurahan (urban village) for cities or for those communities within regencies which have town characteristics. According to the 2019 report by the Ministry of Home Affairs, there are 8,488 urban villages and 74,953 rural villages in Indonesia. North Aceh Regency contained the highest number of rural villages (852) amongst all of the regencies of Indonesia, followed by Pidie Regency with 730 rural villages and Bireuen Regency with 609 rural villages. Prabumulih, with only 12 rural villages, contained the fewest. Counted together, the sixteen regencies of Indonesia containing the most rural villages—namely, North Aceh (852), Pidie (730), Bireuen (609), Aceh Besar (604), Tolikara (541), East Aceh (513), Yahukimo (510), Purworejo (469), Lamongan (462), South Nias (459), Kebumen (449), Garut (421), Bojonegoro (419), Bogor (416), Cirebon (412), and Pati (401)—contain one-third of all the rural villages in Indonesia. Five of these are located in Aceh, two in Highland Papua, three in Central Java, two in East Java, three in West Java, and one in North Sumatra. An average number of rural villages in the regencies and 15 cities of Indonesia is 172 villages. A village is the lowest administrative division in Indonesia, and it is the lowest of the four levels. The average land area of villages in Indonesia is about 25.41 km^{2} (9.81 sq mi), while its average population is about 3,723 people.

Number of rural villages in districts of Indonesia is usually varying from 40 to 50 villages. However, there are 9 districts in Indonesia with more than 60 rural villages or its variation, including:

- Abenaho, Yalimo Regency (108 kampungs)
- Dolok, North Padang Lawas Regency (86 rural villages)
- Lhoksukon, North Aceh Regency (75 gampongs)
- Peusangan, Bireuën Regency (69 gampongs)
- Krayan, Nunukan Regency (65 rural villages)
- Padang Tiji, Pidie Regency (64 gampongs)
- Pidie (town), Pidie Regency (64 gampongs)
- Padang Bolak, North Padang Lawas Regency (62 rural villages)
- Welarek, Yalimo Regency (61 kampungs)

The total number of villages in these 9 districts was 654, about 0.7% percent of 74,953 rural villages in Indonesia. However, Krayan District has subsequently been divided into three districts, containing 23, 17 and 25 villages respectively.

== Types of villages ==
=== Kelurahan ===
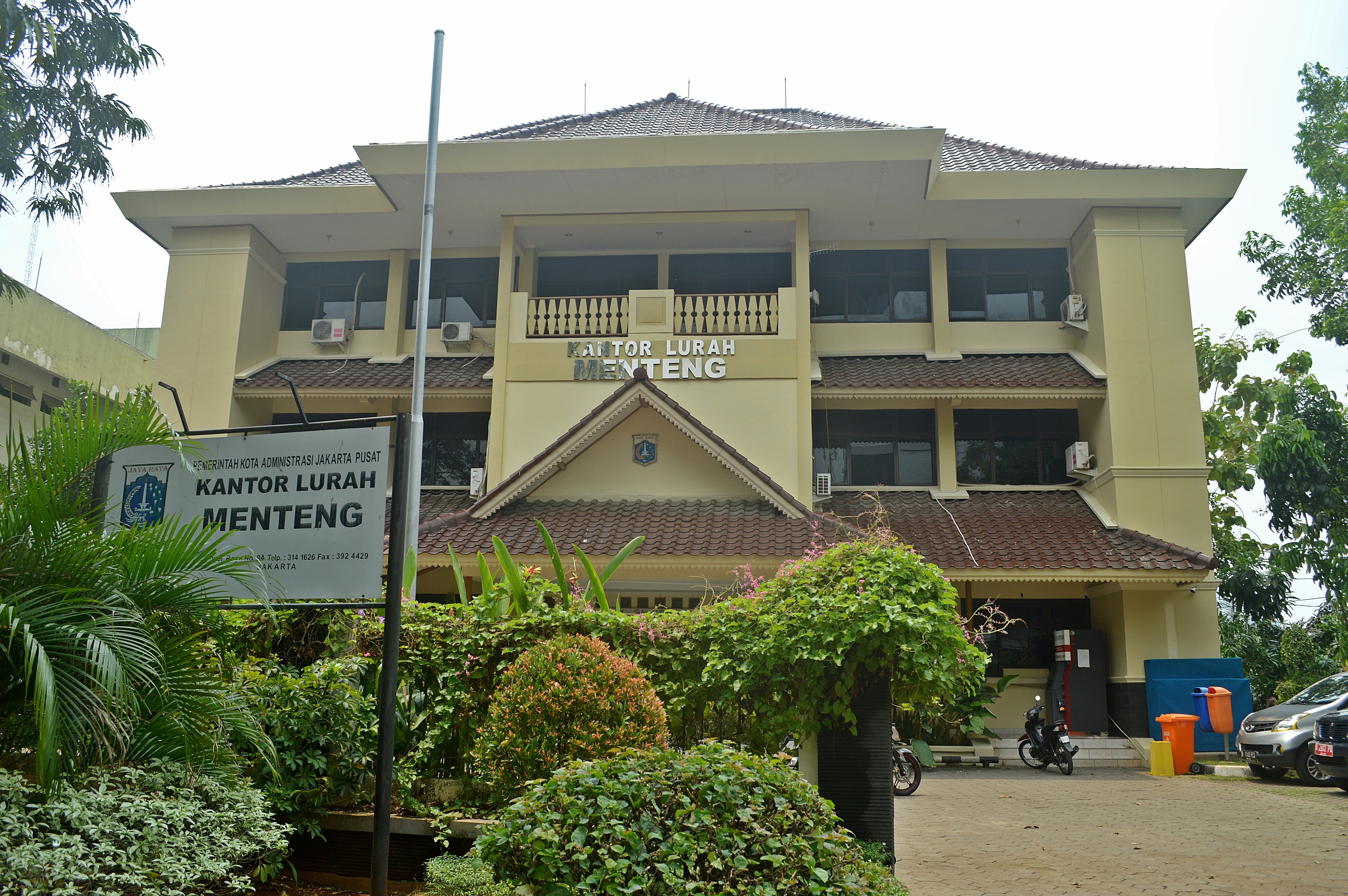
The kelurahan office of Menteng, Central Jakarta, Jakarta

Kelurahan is an urban village term primarily used in cities, but also tiny parts of regencies. It is commonly translated to English as subdistrict. The leader of a kelurahan is called lurah. Major cities in Indonesia such as Jakarta, Surabaya and Medan are entirely urbanised and thus no rural villages. A lurah is a civil servant appointed by the district head. According to the Regulation of the Minister of Home Affairs Number 31 of 2006, a kelurahan can be created with the following criteria:

- Java and Bali: having at least 4,500 residents or 900 families within an area of at least 3 km^{2}.
- Sumatra and Sulawesi: having at least 2,000 residents or 400 families within an area of at least 5 km^{2}.
- Kalimantan, West Nusa Tenggara, East Nusa Tenggara, Maluku, and Papua: having at least 900 residents or 180 families within an area of at least 7 km^{2}.

A kelurahan must have a government office, an established transportation network, adequate communication facilities, and public facilities. If it no longer meets the above conditions it can be abolished or combined with other kelurahans based on the results of research and studies conducted by the city/regency government.

=== Desa ===
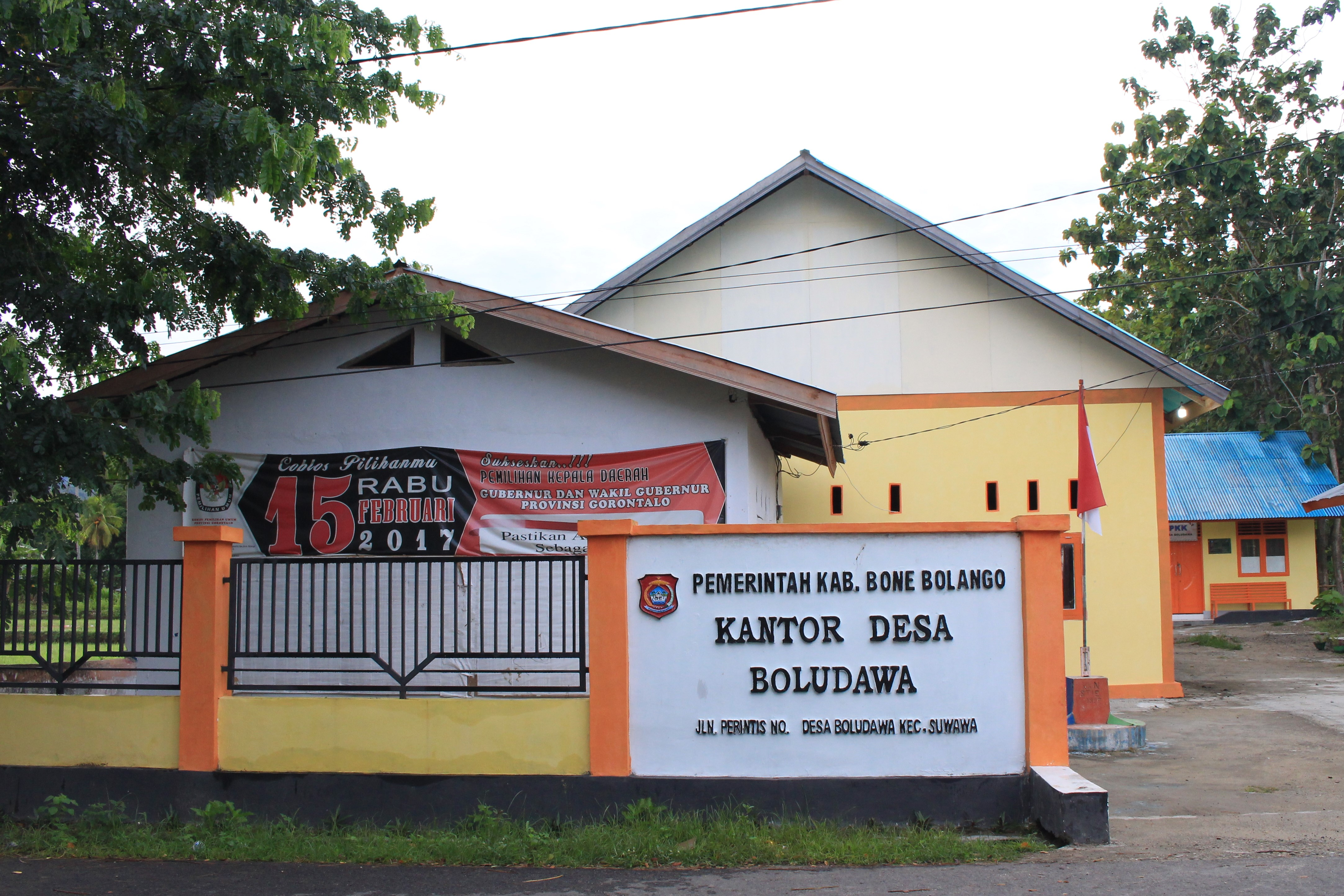
The desa office of Boludawa, Bone Bolango Regency, Gorontalo

Desa is a rural village terminology used in the majority of regencies in Indonesia, but also in tiny parts of cities. However, several provinces have adopted their own terminology for their traditional villages (desa adat). The leader of a desa does not have a civil servant status and is chosen by the public through an election. According to the Law Number 6 of 2014, desa and desa adat are legal community units that have territorial boundaries that are authorized to regulate and administer government affairs, community interests based on community initiatives, original rights, and/or traditional rights recognized and respected in the government system of the Republic of Indonesia.

Variations of desa terminology in Indonesia include:

- Gampong in Aceh
- Nagari in West Sumatra^{[a]}
- Dusun in Bungo Regency (Jambi)^{[b]}
- Nagori in Simalungun Regency (North Sumatra)
- Kampung in some places in Indonesia:^{[c]}
  - Lampung (in Central Lampung, Tulang Bawang, Way Kanan, and West Tulangbawang regencies)
  - East Kalimantan (in Berau, Mahakam Ulu, and West Kutai regencies)
  - Provinces in Western New Guinea
- Kuwu in Cirebon and Indramayu regencies (West Java)
- Pekon in Pringsewu, Tanggamus, and West Lampung regencies (Lampung)
- Tiyuh in West Tulang Bawang Regency (Lampung)
- In Bali, there are two forms of desa, i.e. desa dinas (service village) and desa adat (cultural village). Desa dinas deals with administrative functions, while desa adat deals with religious and cultural functions.
- Lembang in Tana Toraja and North Toraja regencies (South Sulawesi)
- Kalurahan in Special Region of Yogyakarta
- Negeri (distinct from desa) in islands of Ambon and Seram (Maluku)
- Ohoi and Finua in Southeast Maluku and Tual (Maluku)

== Number of villages ==
Provinces	Number of villages as of 2019			2023
Provinces	Kelurahan	Desa	Total	total
Aceh	0	6,497	6,497	6,500
North Sumatra	693	5,417	6,110	6,110
West Sumatra	230	928	1,158	1,165
Riau	268	1,591	1,859	1,862
Jambi	163	1,399	1,562	1,585
South Sumatra	387	2,853	3,240	3,258
Bengkulu	172	1,341	1,513	1,513
Lampung	205	2,435	2,640	2,651
Bangka Belitung Islands	82	309	391	393
Riau Islands	142	275	417	419
Special Region of Jakarta	267	0	267	267
West Java	645	5,312	5,957	5,957
Central Java	753	7,809	8,562	8,563
Special Region of Yogyakarta	46	392	438	438
East Java	777	7,724	8,501	8,494
Banten	313	1,238	1,551	1,552
Bali	80	636	716	716
West Nusa Tenggara	142	1,005	1,147	1,166
East Nusa Tenggara	327	3,026	3,353	3,442
West Kalimantan	99	2,031	2,130	2,145
Central Kalimantan	139	1,432	1,571	1,571
South Kalimantan	144	1,864	2,008	2,016
East Kalimantan	197	841	1,038	1,038
North Kalimantan	35	447	482	482
North Sulawesi	332	1,507	1,839	1,839
Central Sulawesi	175	1,842	2,017	2,017
South Sulawesi	792	2,255	3,047	3,059
Southeast Sulawesi	377	1,911	2,288	2,287
Gorontalo	72	657	729	729
West Sulawesi	73	575	648	648
Maluku	35	1,198	1,233	1,235
North Maluku	118	1,063	1,181	1,185
West Papua	95	1,742	1,837	824
Southwest Papua				1,013
Papua	110	5,411	5,521	999
Central Papua				1,208
Highland Papua				2,627
South Papua				690
Total	8,488	74,953	83,441	83,763

== See also ==
- Village-owned enterprise (Indonesian: Badan Usaha Milik Desa), a type of company that is managed and established by an Indonesian village
- Other similar administrative divisions found outside Indonesia:
  - Communes of France
  - Barangay
  - Muban
  - Commune (Vietnam)
  - Incorporated municipality
  - Civil township
  - Community (Wales)
  - Civil parish
  - Dehestan (administrative division)
  - Comune
  - Municipalities of Germany
  - Hromada
  - Municipalities of Spain

== Notes ==
- ^{^[a]} except Mentawai Islands Regency
- ^{^[b]} In other places, "dusun" is an administrative division form below "desa".
- ^{^[c]} In other places, "kampung" is equal with "dusun", except in Bungo, Jambi.
