= Natar =

Place in Indonesia

Coordinates: 5°19′S 105°12′E

Natar is a town and administrative district in South Lampung Regency, part of Lampung Province on the island of Sumatra, Indonesia. The town had a population of 17,197 as at mid 2024.

== Natar District ==
The district covers an area of 269.58 km^{2} and had a population of 191,833 at the 2020 Census, comprising 98,274 males and 93,559 females; the official estimate in mid 2024 was 203,709, comprising 103,439 males and 100,270 females. It is situated to the north of Bandar Lampung city, and consists of twenty-six villages (all classed as rural desa), which share a postal code of 35362; many of these are suburban to Bandar Lampung. The administrative centre of the district is the town of Merak Batin.

Name	Area in km^{2}	Pop'n Census 2020	Pop'n Estimate mid 2024
Hajimena	7.50	14,871	13,781
Sidosari	2.97	5,526	6,217
Pemanggilan	1.18	8,764	8,936
Natar (town)	16.15	16,143	17,197
Merak Batin	3.00	16,683	17,496
Krawang Sari	10.62	5,280	5,393
Muara Putih	16.85	6,637	7,215
Tanjungsari	11.00	10,219	11,659
Negara Ratu	8.50	13,782	15,311
Rejosari	51.65	4,069	4,276
Bumisari	3.01	8,505	8,941
Candimas	10.28	11,505	12,519
Pancasila	10.88	2,968	3,306

Name	Area in km^{2}	Pop'n Census 2020	Pop'n Estimate mid 2024
Sukadamai ^{(a)}	11.32	7,234	7,798
Bandar Rejo	8.17	3,416	3,689
Purwosari	10.27	3,512	3,728
Rulungraya	10.07	5,229	5,486
Brantiraya	10.50	11,738	12,202
Haduyang	7.63	7,139	7,547
Banjarnegeri	4.25	4,989	5,343
Mandah	9.05	4,677	4,867
Rulunghelok	12.60	2,710	2,867
Kali Sari	4.87	8,174	9,136
Wai Sari	6.40	2,100	2,364
Rulung Mulya	8.26	1,914	1,935
Rulung Sari	12.60	4,049	4,481

Note: (a) the most easterly of the villages in the district, Sukadamai actually is located due north of Jati Agung District.
