= Gunungrejo, Way Ratai, Pesawaran =

Gunungrejo is a village in the Way Ratai, Pesawaran, Pesawaran Regency, Lampung Province, Indonesia. It was initially a hamlet in Desa Wates Way Ratai.

== History ==
Initially Gunungrejo was a hamlet in Desa Wates Way Ratai which know as ANGLO (AFDELING name in Way Ratai rubber plantation). On 23 October 1986, Dusun Gunungrejo officially reformed to a new administrative district of Desa persiapan Gunungrejo, which contains 12 Dusun: Kalipasir I, Kalipasir II, Gunungrejo, Kaliawi, Fajarbulan, Gunungsari, Lebaksari, Tamansari, Totoharjo, Merawan, Sidorejo and Candipuro.

In 2013, Desa Gunungrejo reformed into 3 village:

1. Desa Gunungrejo
2. Desa Mulyosari
3. Desa Poncorejo

Headman

Num.	Headman Name	Term in office
1.	Basnu MS (Act)	1986-1990
2.	Samsuri (Act)	1990-1992
3.	Suwardi (Act)	1992-1994
4.	Mulyanto	1994-2002
5.	Rudi Agus Sunandar	2002-2008
6.	Suranto	2008-2021
7.	Subagyo	2021–Present

== Dusun ==
There are 9 Dusun in Desa Gunungrejo:

1. Dusun Ngadirejo
2. Dusun Kalipasir
3. Dusun Gunungrejo 1
4. Dusun Gunungrejo 2
5. Dusun Kaliawi
6. Dusun Tegalrejo
7. Dusun Talangbandung
8. Dusun Candisari 1
9. Dusun Candisari 2

== Demographic ==
Desa Gunungrejo borders:

North: Forest of Pesawaran Mountain

South: Desa Poncorejo, Kecamatan Way Ratai

East: Desa Mulyosari, Kecamatan Way Ratai

West: Desa Babakan Loa, Kecamatan Kedondong

Desa Gunungrejo covered hills and mountains with 400 - 500 MSL in height and 1343,41 Ha in width.

== Educational Facility ==
- PAUD Miftahul Huda
- Sekolah Dasar Negeri 7 Way Ratai
- Sekolah Dasar Negeri 14 Way Ratai
- Sekolah Dasar Negeri 21 Way Ratai
- Madrasah tsanawiyah Al-ikhlas
- Madrasah aliyah Al-ikhlas
- Madrasah ibtidaiyah Nurul Huda
- Madrasah tsanawiyah Nurul Huda
- Madrasah aliyah Nurul Huda
