= Way Ratai, Pesawaran =

Way Ratai is an administrative district (kecamatan) of Pesawaran Regency, Lampung Province, Indonesia. This district was created out of part of the district of Padang Cermin.

== See also ==
- Gunungrejo, Way Ratai, Pesawaran
