= Tanjung Bintang =

Place in Indonesia

Coordinates: 5°19′S 105°12′E

Tanjung Bintang is an administrative district (kecamatan) in South Lampung Regency, part of Lampung Province on the island of Sumatra, Indonesia. The district lies to the east of the city of Bandar Lampung and covers an area of 165.94 km^{2} and had a population of 82,184 at the 2020 Census; the official estimate in mid 2025 was 91,447 (comprising 45,228 males and 44,084 females in 2024). It consists of sixteen rural villages (desa), which share a postal code of 35361; many of these are suburban to Bandar Lampung. The administrative centre of the district is the village of Jati Baru.

== Administrative divisions ==
Kode Wilayah	Name	Area in km^{2}	Pop'n Estimate mid 2024
18.01.05.2001	Kali Asin	5.77	4,990
18.01.05.2003	Lematang	9.77	2,901
18.01.05.2004	Sukanegara	8.63	6,914
18.01.05.2005	Serdang	10.90	12,217
18.01.05.2006	Sinar Ogan	4.62	2,346
18.01.05.2007	Jati Baru	10.11	11,527
18.01.05.2008	Sabah Balau	16.45	7,131
18.01.05.2009	Budi Lestari	15.85	4,721

Kode Wilayah	Name	Area in km^{2}	Pop'n Estimate mid 2024
18.01.06.2010	Trimulyo	9.95	3,623
18.01.06.2011	Jati Indah	5.52	4,896
18.01.06.2012	Way Galih	12.77	7,937
18.01.06.2013	Sindang Sari	14.33	5,804
18.01.06.2015	Purwodadi Simpang	12.66	5,307
18.01.06.2021	Galih Lunik	10.78	2,876
18.01.06.2022	Rejomulyo	10.36	2,845
18.01.06.2023	Sri Katon	7.47	3,277
