= Lampung United F.C. =

Indonesian football club in Lampung

Lampung United
- Full name: Lampung United Football Club
- Nicknames: Gajah Perkasa (Mighty Elephant)
- Short name: LUFC
- Founded: 1 February 2019; 7 years ago
- Ground: Sumpah Pemuda Stadium
- Capacity: 15,000
- Owner: Eko J. Saputra
- CEO: Arief Maulana
- Coach: Isman Jasulmei
- League: Liga 4
- 2024–25: 3rd, in Group A (Lampung zone)
Home colours	Away colours

Lampung United Football Club (simply known as LUFC or Lampung United) is an Indonesian football club based in Bandar Lampung, Lampung. This club was founded on February 1, 2019. They currently compete in the Liga 4 and their homeground is Sumpah Pemuda Stadium. In the liga 4 Lampung United Football Club withdrew before the league begin due to financial and operational problem.
