= SS Lampung F.C. =

Indonesian football club in Lampung

SS Lampung
- Full name: Sakai Sambayan Lampung Football Club
- Nickname(s): Gajah Beringas (The Violent Elephant)
- Short name: SSLFC
- Founded: 2014; 11 years ago
- Ground: Sumpah Pemuda Stadium
- Capacity: 25,000
- Owner: Askot PSSI Bandar Lampung
- Chairman: Dicky Pratowo
- Manager: Rizki Anugrah
- Coach: Imam Riyadi
- League: Liga 4
- 2023-24: 3nd, (Lampung zone)
Home colours	Away colours

Sakai Sambayan Lampung Football Club (simply known as SS Lampung) is an Indonesian football club based in Bandar Lampung, Lampung. They currently compete in the Liga 4 and their homeground is Sumpah Pemuda Stadium.

== Honours ==
- Liga 3 Lampung
  - Champion : 2018
  - Runner-up : 2019
