= Gedung Tataan =

Coordinates: 5°19′S 105°12′E

Gedung Tataan is a town (desa) and an administrative district (kecamatan) of Pesawaran Regency, Lampung Province of Indonesia (in the south of Sumatra). The town covers an area of 3.6 km^{2}, and had a population of 5,584 as at mid 2024. The district covers an area of 97.06 km^{2} and had a population of 107,370 at the 2020 Census; the official estimate in mid 2024 was 111,567, comprising 56,875 males and 54,692 females. It is situated to the west of Bandar Lampung city, and consists of nineteen villages (all classed as rural desa), which share a postal code of 35366; many of these are suburban to Bandar Lampung. The administrative centre of the district is the desa of Gedung Tataan.

Name of desa	Area in km^{2}	Pop'n Estimate mid 2024
Padang Ratu	1.00	1,971
Cipadang	8.00	8,668
Pampangan	2.00	2,458
Waylayap	3.25	4,072
Sukadadi	6.00	5,993
Bogorejo	6.06	5,551
Sukaraja	1.00	10,510
Gedung Tataan	3.60	5,584
Kutoarjo	6.10	3,435
Karang Anyar	6.25	3,623

Name of desa	Area in km^{2}	Pop'n Estimate mid 2024
Bagelen	4.30	8,306
Kebagusan	4.00	7,668
Wiyono	7.00	8,088
Tamansari	16.95	6,692
Bernung	8.05	6,140
Sungai Langka	1.00	6,304
Negeri Sakti	2.50	7,111
Kurungannyawa	7.50	6,304
Sukabanjar	2.50	3,089
Totals	97.06	111,567
