= Jati Agung =

Administrative district in Indonesia

Jati Agung District is an administrative district (kecamatan) in South Lampung Regency, part of Lampung Province on the island of Sumatra, Indonesia. The district covers an area of 164.47 km^{2} and had a population of 128,604 at the 2020 Census, comprising 66,105 males and 62,499 females; the official estimate in mid 2024 was 129,171, comprising 65,811 males and 63,360 females. It is situated to the northeast of Bandar Lampung city, and consists of twenty-one villages (all classed as rural desa), which share a postal code of 35365; many of these are suburban to Bandar Lampung. The administrative centre of the district is the town of Marga Agung.

Name	Area in km^{2}	Pop'n Census 2020	Pop'n Estimate mid 2024
Way Huwi	4.93	13,372	10,303
Jatimulyo	10.59	20,603	20,082
Banjar Agung	5.86	2,737	3,215
Gedung Harapan	4.65	799	952
Gedung Agung	5.33	1,745	1,949
Margomulyo	9.16	2,943	3,153
Sidodadi Asri	4.81	6,207	6,456

Name	Area in km^{2}	Pop'n Census 2020	Pop'n Estimate mid 2024
Purwotani	6.40	2,590	2,698
Sumber Jaya	6.00	4,454	4,757
Margodadi	6.48	3,021	3,366
Margo Lestari	6.25	2,965	3,241
Marga Agung	5.76	4,812	4,834
Marga Kaya	7.15	3,536	3,852
Sinar Rejeki	29.34	7,838	8,547

Name	Area in km^{2}	Pop'n Census 2020	Pop'n Estimate mid 2024
Sidoharjo	6.10	3,142	3,358
Rejomulyo	7.15	6,221	6,551
Karang Anyar	10.75	20,405	20,033
Fajar Baru	6.40	7,758	7,416
Karang Sari	7.25	6,148	6,497
Karang Rejo	7.42	5,442	5,807
Margorejo	6.69	1,866	2,104
