= PSBL Bandar Lampung =

Association football team in Indonesia

- Full name: Perserikatan Sepakbola Bandar Lampung
- Nickname: Laskar Radin Inten (Radin Inten Warrior)
- Founded: 1985; 41 years ago
- Ground: Pahoman Stadium; Bandar Lampung; Lampung
- Capacity: 15,000
- Owner: Askot PSSI Bandar Lampung
- Chairman: Aziz Syamsudin
- Manager: Makmur
- Coach: Dirsono
- League: Liga 4
- 2023–24: Runner-up, (Lampung zone)
Home colours	Away colours

Perserikatan Sepakbola Bandar Lampung or PSBL is a professional Indonesian football club which currently competes in Liga 4. Their home games are played at Pahoman Stadium, Bandar Lampung, which has a capacity of 15,000 (both standing and seated).

== Season-by-season records ==
Season(s)	League/Division	Tms.	Pos.	Piala Indonesia
1994–95	First Division	16	3	–
1995–96	First Division	24	Semi-final	–
1996–97	Premier Division	33	6th, West division	–
1997–98	Premier Division	31	did not finish	–
1998–99	Premier Division	28	4th, Group B	–
1999–2000	Premier Division	28	9th, West division	–
2001	Premier Division	28	9th, West division	–
2002	Premier Division	24	10th, West division	–
2003	First Division	26	7th, Group A	–
2004	Second Division	41	4th, Second round	–
2005	First Division	27	7th, Group 1	First round
2006	First Division	36	9th, Group 1	First round
2007	First Division	40	6th, Group 1	Qualifying round
2008–09	First Division	48	3rd, Group 2	–
2009–10	First Division	60	4th, Third round	–
2010	First Division	57	5th, Group 4	–
2011–12	First Division	66	Third round	–
2013	First Division	77	Second round	–
2014	First Division	73	3rd, Second round	–
2015	Liga Nusantara	season abandoned		–
2016	ISC Liga Nusantara			–
2017	Liga 3	32	Eliminated in Provincial round	–
2018				
2019	Liga 3	32	Eliminated in Provincial round	–
2020	Liga 3	season abandoned		
2021–22				
2022–23	Liga 3	season abandoned		–
2023–24	Liga 3	80	Eliminated in Provincial round	–
