= Pahoman Stadium =

Indonesian football stadium

- Location in Lampung
- Address: Jl. Ir. H. Juanda, Pahoman, Tlk. North Betung, Bandar Lampung City, Lampung 35228; Indonesia
- Location: Bandar Lampung, Lampung
- Coordinates: 5.426121°S 105.269138°E
- Owner: City government of Bandar Lampung
- Operator: City government of Bandar Lampung
- Capacity: 15,000
- Surface: grass field

Construction
- Groundbreaking: 1977

Tenants
- Nusantara Lampung (2025–2026); PSBL Bandar Lampung

Stadion Pahoman is a football stadium which is also sometimes used for athletics in Bandar Lampung, Lampung, Indonesia. The stadium has a capacity of 15,000 and opened in 1977.
