= AD Sport F.C. =

Indonesian football club

AD Sport
- Full name: Angkatan Darat Sport Football Club
- Nickname: Laskar Garuda Hitam (Black Garuda Warriors)
- Ground: Satlog Korem 043/Gatam Field; Bandar Lampung, Lampung
- Owner: Komando Resor Militer 043/Garuda Hitam
- Coach: Aidi Sopian
- League: Liga 4
- 2024–25: Semi-finals, (Lampung zone)
Home colours	Away colours

Angkatan Darat Sport Football Club (simply known as AD Sport) is an Indonesian football club based in Bandar Lampung, Lampung. They currently competes in Liga 4 Lampung zone.

== Honours ==
- Liga 3 Lampung
  - Champions (2): 2019, 2021
