= TS Saiburai =

Indonesian football club

- Full name: Tim Sepakbola Sai Bumi Ruwa Jurai
- Nickname: Laskar Pesisir (Coastal Warriors)
- Short name: TSS
- Founded: 2016; 10 years ago, as Harnas 31 Group FC
- Ground: Harnas Way Tataan Field; Bandar Lampung; Lampung
- Capacity: 500
- Owner: Askot PSSI Bandar Lampung
- Chairman: Arie Nanda Djausal
- Manager: Ahmad Afnan Mulyadi
- Coach: Sahala Saragih
- League: Liga 4
- 2025–26: 2nd, (Lampung zone)
Home colours	Away colours

Tim Sepakbola Sai Bumi Ruwa Jurai (simply known as TS Saiburai) is an Indonesian football club based in Way Tataan, Bandar Lampung, Lampung. They currently compete in the Liga 4 Lampung zone.

== Honours ==
- Liga 3 Lampung
  - Champion (1): 2023–24
- Liga 4 Lampung
  - Runner-up (2): 2024–25, 2025–26
