= Persikomet Metro =

Indonesian football club

Persikomet
- Full name: Persatuan Sepakbola Indonesia Kota Metro
- Nicknames: The Comet; Metro Boys
- Founded: 1999; 26 years ago
- Ground: Tejosari Stadium; Metro, Lampung
- Capacity: 20,000
- Owner: PSSI Metro City
- Manager: Rustiawan
- Coach: Johan Wahyudi
- League: Liga 4
- 2024–25: 1st, (Lampung zone); First round, 4th in Group B (National phase)
Home colours	Away colours	Third colours

Persatuan Sepakbola Indonesia Kota Metro (simply known as Persikomet) is an Indonesian football team based in Metro, Lampung. They currently compete in Liga 4.

== Honours ==
- LI Third Division Lampung
  - Champions (1): 2011–12
- Liga 3 Lampung
  - Runner-up (1): 2021
- Liga 4 Lampung
  - Champions (1): 2024–25
- Soeratin Cup U–15 Lampung
  - Champions (1): 2018
