= Sumpah Pemuda Stadium =

Indonesian stadium

Coordinates: 5°22′44″S 105°16′46″E

- Sumpah Pemuda Stadium
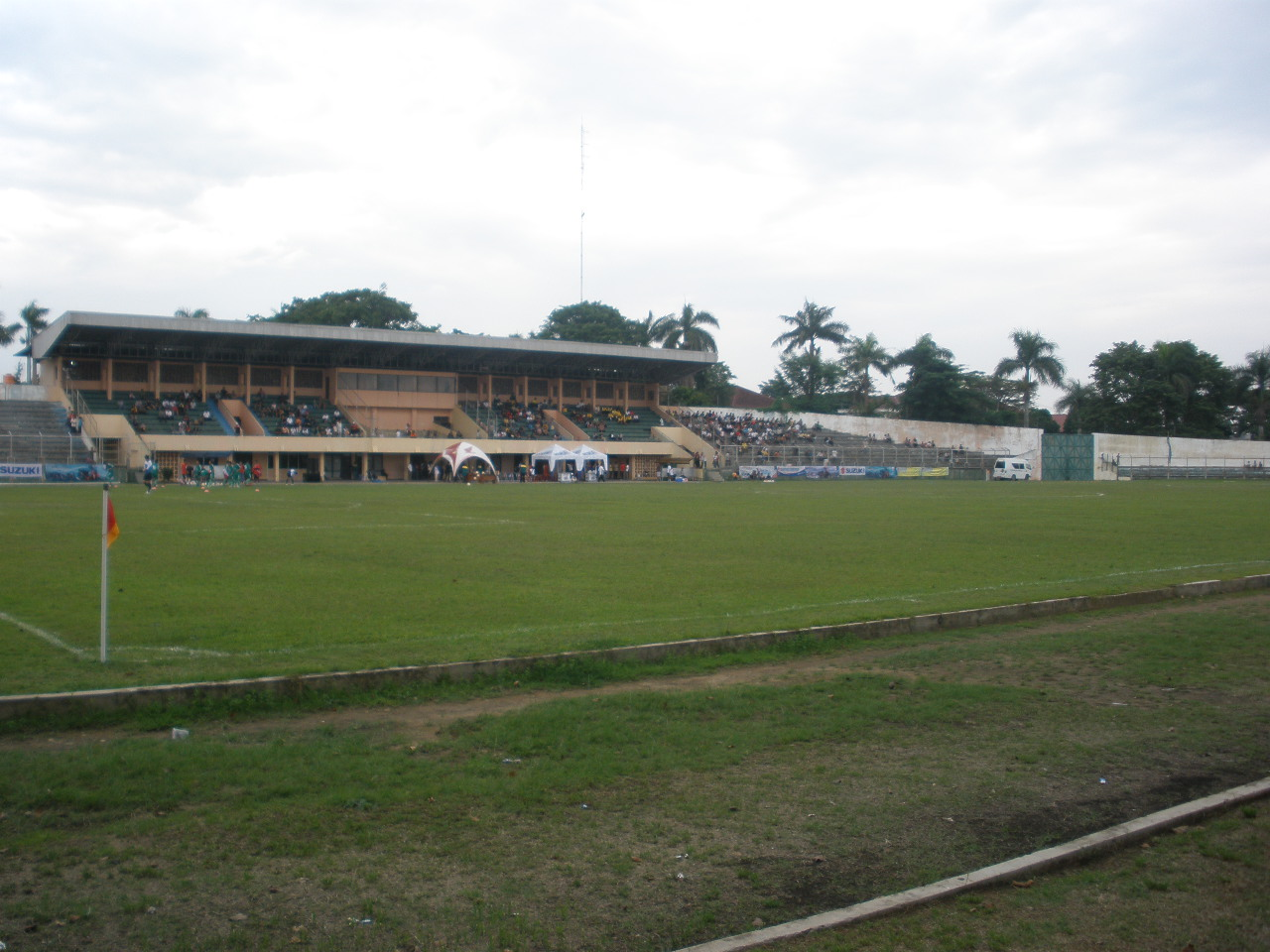
- Interactive map of Sumpah Pemuda Stadium
- Location: Bandar Lampung, Lampung, Indonesia
- Capacity: 7,159
- Surface: Zoysia Japonica

Construction
- Renovated: 23 May 2019

Tenant
- Bhayangkara Presisi Lampung (2025–present)

Sumpah Pemuda Stadium or Stadion Sumpah Pemuda is a football stadium which is also sometimes used for athletics in Lampung, Indonesia. The stadium has a capacity of 7,159. Lampung Sakti, PSBL Bandar Lampung, Badak Lampung and Bhayangkara Presisi Lampung are the tenants of the venue.

== Location ==
PKOR Way Halim (Jl. Sultan Agung, Way Halim), Bandar Lampung, Lampung, Indonesia

== History ==
In April 2025, the stadium was chosen as the home base of Bhayangkara for the 2025–26 Super League season.
