= Kalianda =

Place in Indonesia

Coordinates: 5°19′S 105°12′E

Kalianda is a town (kelurahan) and an administrative district (kecamatan) in South Lampung Regency, part of Lampung Province on the island of Sumatra, Indonesia. The town had a population of 5,752 as at mid 2023.

== Administrative divisions ==
The district lies to the southeast of the city of Bandar Lampung and covers an area of 226.05 km^{2} and had a population of 94,127 at the 2020 Census; the official estimate in mid 2023 was 98,673 (comprising 50,102 males and 48,571 females). It consists of four urban villages (kelurahan) and twenty-five rural villages (desa), which share a postal code of 35551; many of these are suburban to Bandar Lampung. The administrative centre of the district is the town of Bumi Agung.

Kode Wilayah	Name	Area in km^{2}	Pop'n Estimate mid 2023
18.01.06.2001	Jondong	4.67	1,409
18.01.06.2002	Tengkujuh	5.70	1,243
18.01.06.2003	Pauh Tanjung Iman	6.00	1,397
18.01.06.2004	Sumur Kumbang	3.78	1,478
18.01.06.2005	Maja	3.80	1,484
18.01.06.1006	Bumi Agung ^{(a)}	5.11	4,608
18.01.06.1007	Kalianda ^{(a)}	6.29	5,752
18.01.06.1008	Way Urang ^{(a)}	9.42	14,795
18.01.06.2009	Buah Berak	3.50	2,078
18.01.06.2010	Kesugihan	5.93	1,971
18.01.06.2011	Pematang	5.16	2,457
18.01.06.2012	Kecapi	5.85	2,022
18.01.06.2013	Babulang	1.75	1,467
18.01.06.2014	Sukaratu	3.60	2,195
18.01.06.2015	Palembapang	8.92	4,767

Kode Wilayah	Name	Area in km^{2}	Pop'n Estimate mid 2023
18.01.06.2016	Tajimalela	10.72	5,299
18.01.06.2017	Canggu	9.75	3,296
18.01.06.2018	Kedaton	9.17	4,992
18.01.06.2019	Merak Belatung	14.10	4,921
18.01.06.2020	Bulok	12.92	2,344
18.01.06.2021	Munjuk Sempurna	8.59	2,608
18.01.06.2022	Gunung Terang	14.10	2,745
18.01.06.2023	Marga Catur	5.85	2,284
18.01.06.2024	Suka Tani	5.45	3,753
18.01.06.2025	Agom	6.30	3,345
18.01.06.2026	Negeri Pandan	18.80	3,121
18.01.06.2027	Taman Agung	14.82	4,053
18.01.06.1028	Wai Lubuk ^{(a)}	7.87	4,444
18.01.06.2029	Hara Banjar Manis	6.13	2,345
Totals for	Kalianda District	226.05	98,673

Note: (a) rated as urban kelurahan.
