= Pesawaran Regency =

Regency in Lampung, Indonesia

Pesawaran Regency Kabupaten Pesawaran
- Regency
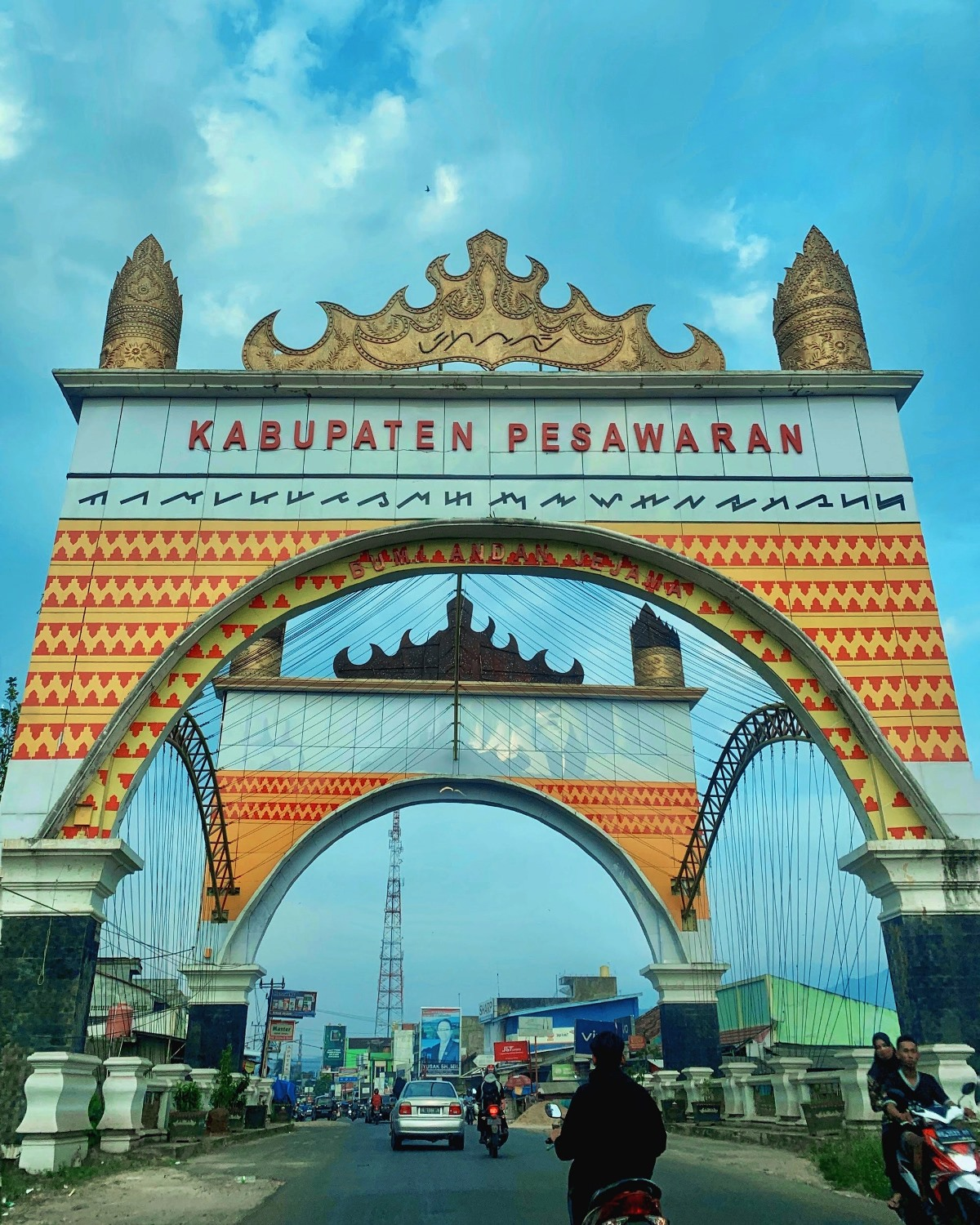
- Gedung Tataan bridge and monument

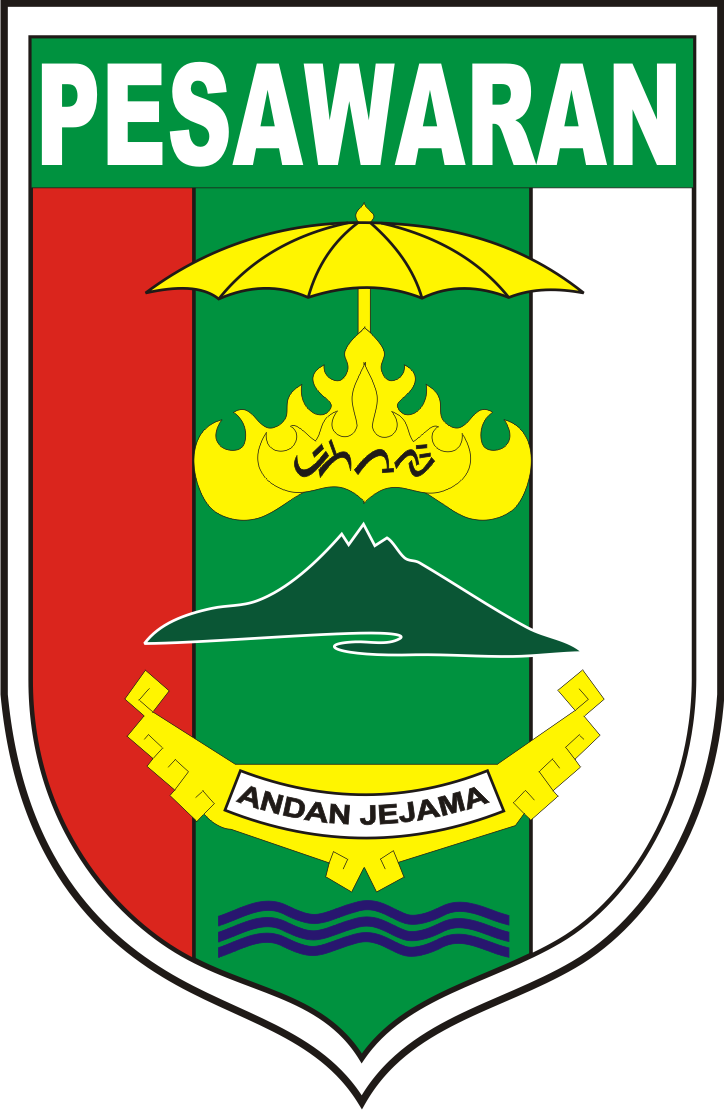
- Coat of arms
- Motto: Andan Jejama (Take care of it together)
- Location within Lampung

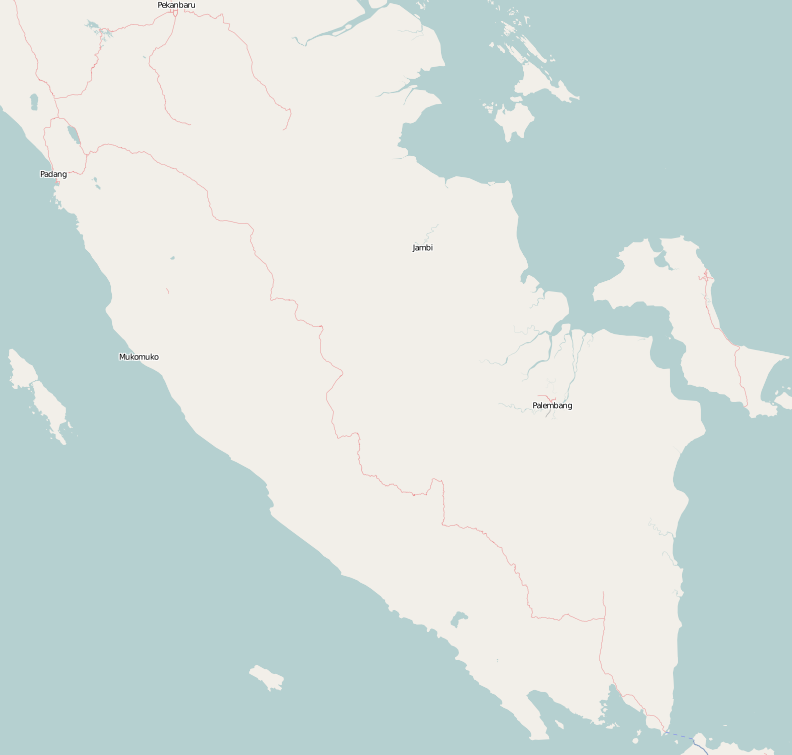
- Location in Southern Sumatra, Sumatra and Indonesia Pesawaran Regency (Sumatra) Pesawaran Regency (Indonesia)
- Coordinates: 5.4298°S 105.1790°E
- Country: Indonesia
- Province: Lampung
- Regency seat: Gedong Tataan

Government
  - Regent: Nanda Indira Bastian
  - Vice Regent: Antonius Muhammad Ali

Area
  - Total: 1,278.21 km^{2} (493.52 sq mi)

Population (2025 estimate)
  - Total: 507,656
  - Density: 397.162/km^{2} (1,028.64/sq mi)
- Time zone: UTC+7 (IWST)
- Area code: (+62) 721
- Website: pesawarankab.go.id

Pesawaran Regency is a regency (kabupaten) of Lampung Province, Sumatra, Indonesia. It covers an area of 1,278.21 km^{2}, and had a population of 398,848 at the 2010 Census and 477,468 at the 2020 Census; the official estimate as of mid 2025 was 507,656 (comprising 260,486 males and 247,170 females). The regency seat is the town of Gedung Tataan (sometimes written as "Gedong Tataan"). This regency was formerly part of South Lampung Regency from which it was separated on 17 July 2007.

== Administrative districts ==
Administratively, at the 2010 Census the regency was divided into seven districts (kecamatan). However, since 2010 four new districts have been created from parts of existing districts, bringing the total to eleven districts. The four new districts were Marga Punduh, Teluk Pandan, Way Ratai and Way Khilau. The eleven districts are tabulated below with their areas and their areas and their populations at the 2010 Census and the 2020 Census, together with the official estimates as of mid 2025. The table also includes the locations of the district administrative centres, the number of administrative villages (all classed as rural desa) in each district and its post code.

Kode Wilayah	Name of District (kecamatan)	Area in km^{2}	Pop'n Census 2010	Pop'n Census 2020	Pop'n Estimate mid 2025	Admin centre	No. of villages	Post code
18.09.06	Punduh Pidada ^{(a)}	94.67	25,943	15,500	16,094	Bawang	11	35454
18.09.08	Marga Punduh	78.35	^{(b)}	15,360	16,303	Sukajaya Punduh	10	35453
18.09.05	Padang Cermin ^{(c)}	172.78	88,795	29,200	30,520	Padang Cermin	16	35351
18.09.10	Teluk Pandan (Pandan Bay)	118.77	^{(d)}	39,210	40,389	Hurun	10	35350
18.09.11	Way Ratai	96.92	^{(d)}	35,290	37,377	Wai Ratai	10	35455
18.09.07	Kedondong	88.04	57,698	38,020	40,827	Pasar Baru	13	35368
18.09.09	Way Khilau	62.20	^{(e)}	30,890	32,889	Butu Batu	9	35369
18.09.04	Way Lima	128.00	29,442	37,400	40,277	Batu Raja	16	35367
18.09.01	Gedung Tataan	146.51	86,059	107,370	113,094	Gedung Tataan	19	35366
18.09.02	Negeri Katon	150.05	61,158	71,630	77,448	Negeri Katon	19	35353
18.09.03	Tegineneng	141.90	49,753	57,600	62,438	Trimulyo	16	35363
	Totals	1,278.21	398,848	477,468	507,656	Gedong Tataan	144	

Notes: (a) the district includes 30 islands off the south coast of Sumatra, the largest being Pulau Legundi and Pulau Siancal.
(b) the population of the new Marga Punduh District at the 2010 census is included in the figure for the Punduh Pidada District from which it was separated on 18 November 2014.
(c) the district includes 7 islands off the south coast of Sumatra.
(d) the populations of the new Teluk Pandan and Wai Ratai Districts at the 2010 census are included in the figure for the Padang Cermin District from which they were separated on 18 November 2014.
(e) the population of the new Wai Lima District at the 2010 census is included in the figure for the Wai Khilau District from which it was separated on 18 November 2014.

== History ==
In September 2010, a number of people in Umbul Baru were rushed to a community health center after consuming water poisoned by industrial waste which was allegedly dumped in the Cikantor River by the gold mining company PT Napal Umbar Picung (NUP).
