= Pringsewu Regency =

Regency in Lampung, Indonesia

Pringsewu Regency Kabupaten Pringsewu
- Regency
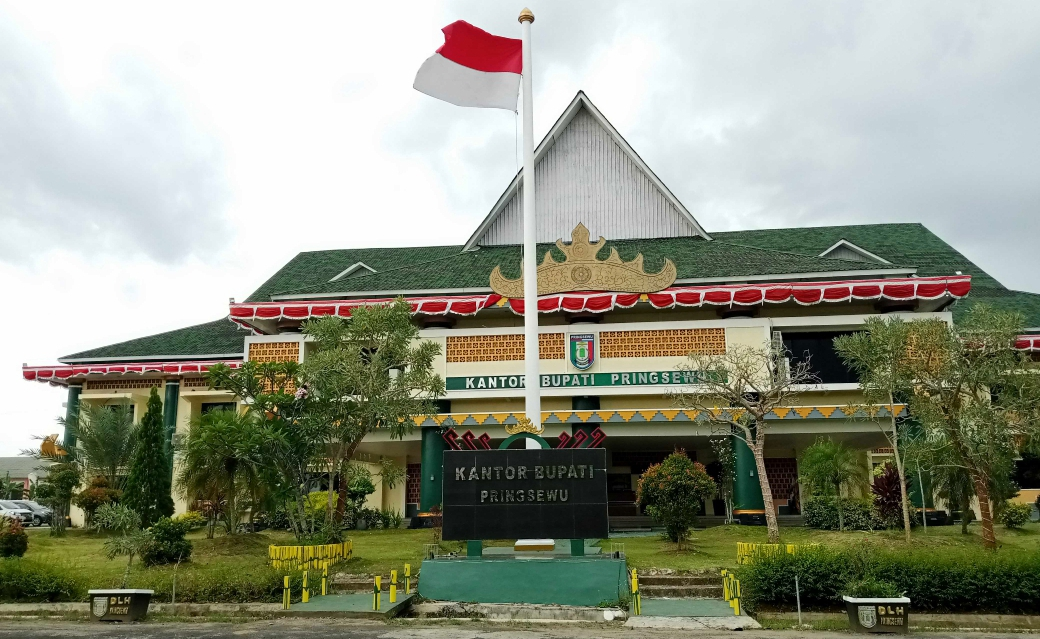
- Regent office of Pringsewu

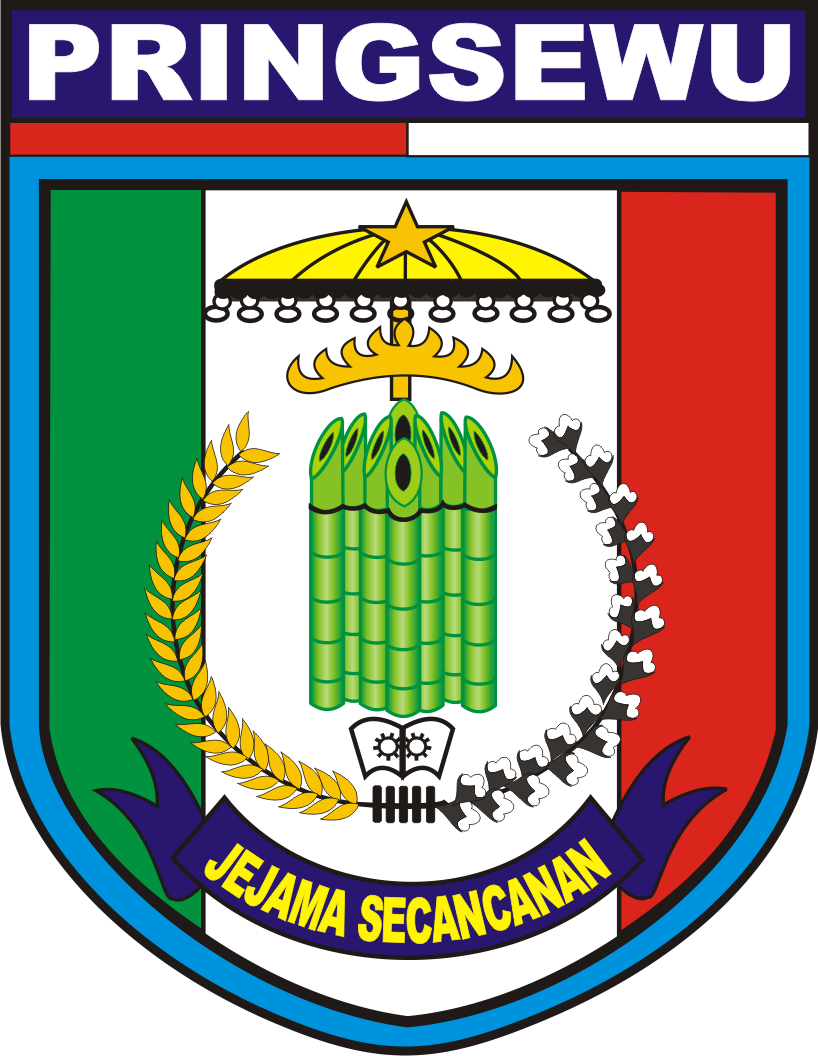
- Coat of arms
- Motto: Jejama Secancanan (Together on mutual cooperation)
- Location within Lampung

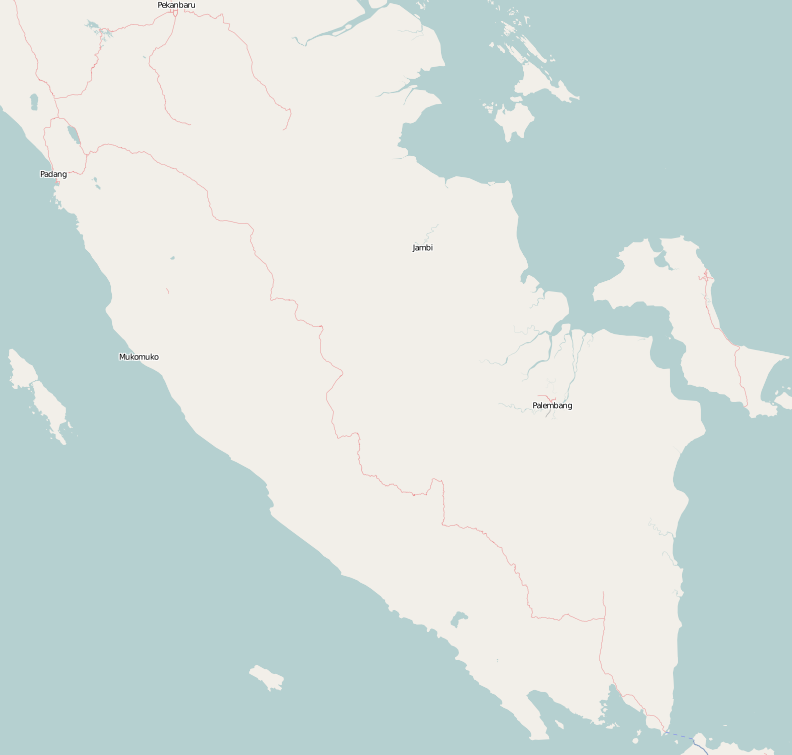
- Location in Southern Sumatra, Sumatra and Indonesia Pringsewu Regency (Sumatra) Pringsewu Regency (Indonesia)
- Coordinates: 5.4221°S 104.9345°E
- Country: Indonesia
- Province: Lampung
- Regency seat: Pringsewu

Government
  - Regent: Riyanto Pamungkas
  - Vice Regent: Umi Laila

Area
  - Total: 617.19 km^{2} (238.30 sq mi)

Population (mid 2025 estimate)
  - Total: 448,220
  - Density: 726.23/km^{2} (1,880.9/sq mi)
- Time zone: UTC+7 (IWST)
- Area code: (+62) 729
- Website: pringsewukab.go.id

Pringsewu Regency is a regency of Lampung Province, Sumatra, Indonesia. It has an area of 617.19 km^{2} and had a population of 364,825 people at the 2010 Census and 405,466 at the 2020 Census; the official estimate as of mid 2025 was 448,220 (comprising 229,240 males and 218,980 females). The regency seat is the town of Pringsewu, located 37 kilometres from the provincial capital of Bandar Lampung. The regency was created on 29 October 2008 from the former eastern part of Tanggamus Regency.

The name of the regency, and of its chief town, came from the Javanese language terms "thousand (sewu) bamboo (pring)", as the location of the town was once a bamboo forest.

== Administrative districts ==
Administratively at 2010 the regency was divided into eight districts (kecamatan). However, since 2010 a ninth district (Pangelaran Utara) has been created from part of the existing Pangelaran District, bringing the total to nine districts. Each district has the same name as the district's administrative centre. These are tabulated below with their areas and their populations at the 2010 Census and the 2020 Census, together with the official estimates as of mid 2025. The table also includes the number of administrative villages in each district (totaling 128 rural desa and 5 urban kelurahan, the latter all in Pringsewu District), and its post code.

Kode Wilayah	Name of District (kecamatan)	Area in km^{2}	Pop'n Census 2010	Pop'n Census 2020	Pop'n Estimate mid 2025	No. of villages	Post code
18.10.04	Pardasuka	87.31	32,131	35,174	38,983	13	35381
18.10.03	Ambarawa	33.11	32,283	36,387	40,844	9	35376
18.10.05	Pangelaran	48.42	58,945	52,042	57,252	22	35375
18.10.09	Pangelaran Utara (North Pangelaran)	158.19	^{(a)}	15,301	16,947	10	35370
18.10.01	Pringsewu (district)	45.28	76,082	81,776	89,421	15 ^{(b)}	35371
18.10.02	Gading Rejo	67.79	69,307	77,727	86,048	23	35372
18.10.08	Sukoharjo	65.59	44,696	49,704	55,124	16	35673
18.10.06	Banyumas	42.71	18,996	21,292	23,819	11	35373
18.10.07	Adiluwih	68.80	32,929	36,063	39,782	14	35674
	Totals	617.20	364,825	405,466	448,220	133	

Note: (a) the 2010 population for the new Pangelaran Utara District is included with the figure for Pangelaran District, from which it was separated.
(b) comprises 5 kelurahan (Fajaresuk, Pringsewu Barat, Pringsewu Selatan, Pringsewu Timur and Pringsewu Utara) and 10 desa.
