= South Lampung Regency =

Regency in Lampung, Indonesia

South Lampung Regency Kabupaten Lampung Selatan
- Regency
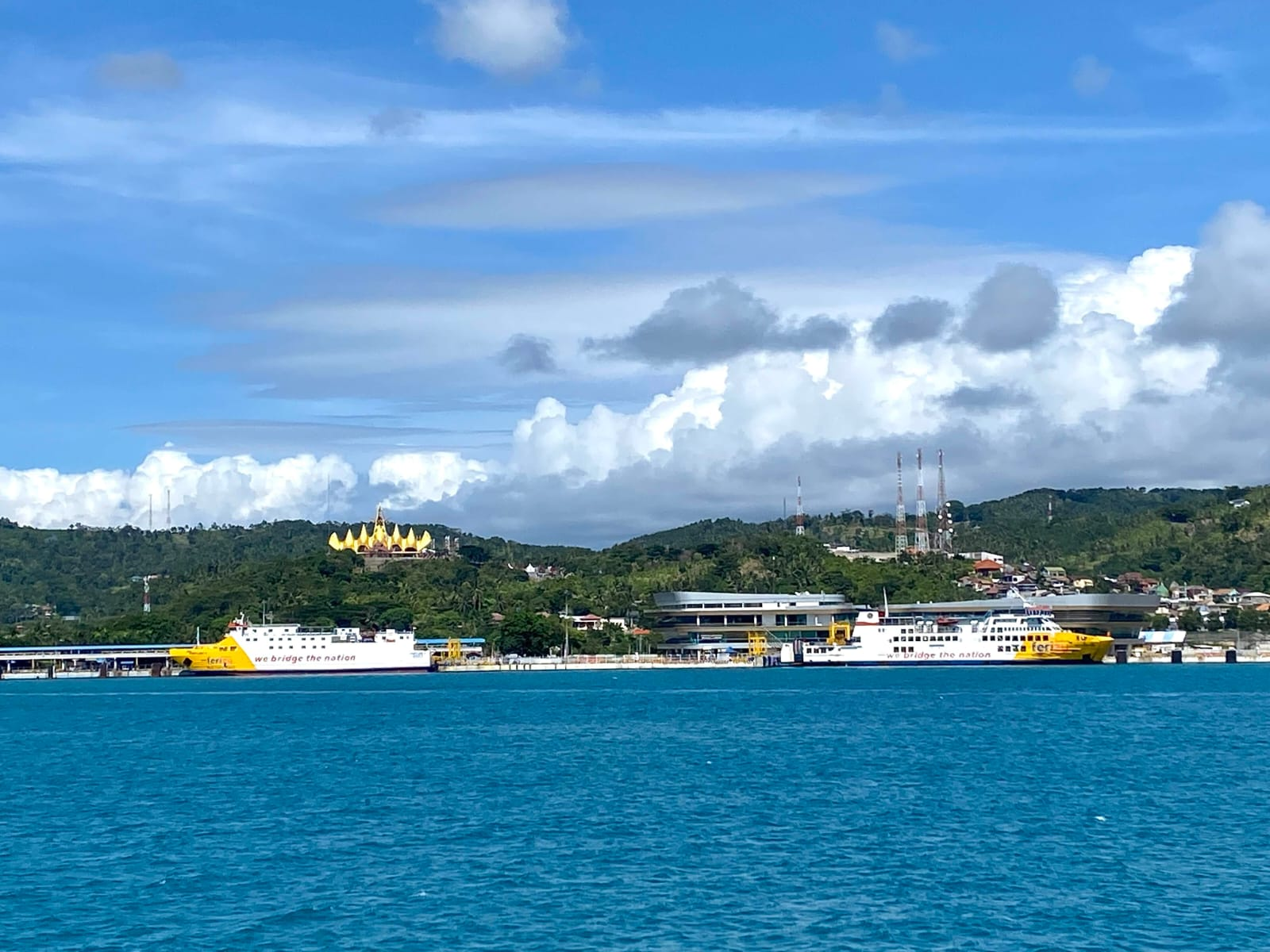
- Port of Bakauheni

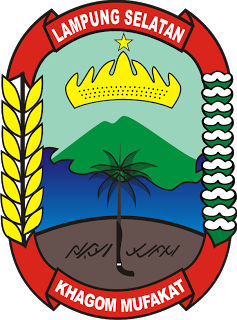
- Seal
- Motto: Khagom Mufakat (Reaching the consensus)
- Location within Lampung

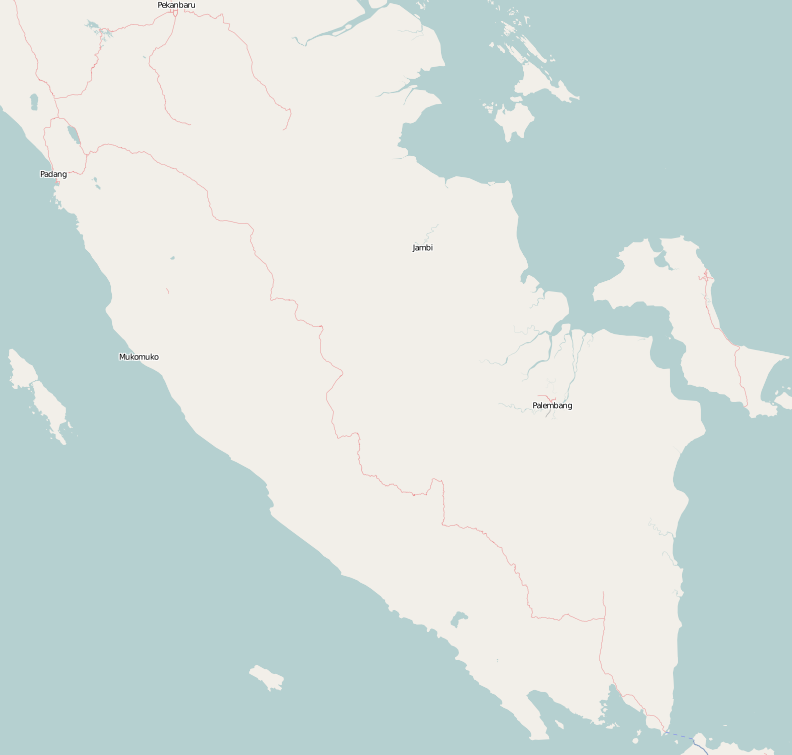
- Location in Southern Sumatra, Sumatra and Indonesia South Lampung Regency (Sumatra) South Lampung Regency (Indonesia)
- Coordinates: 5.5624299°S 105.5475311°E
- Country: Indonesia
- Province: Lampung
- Regency seat: Kalianda

Government
  - Regent: Radityo Egi Pratama
  - Vice Regent: Syaiful Anwar

Area
  - Total: 2,227.38 km^{2} (860.00 sq mi)

Population (mid 2025 estimate)
  - Total: 1,146,074
  - Density: 514.539/km^{2} (1,332.65/sq mi)
- Time zone: UTC+7 (IWST)
- Area code: (+62) 727
- Website: lampungselatankab.go.id

South Lampung Regency (Indonesian: Kabupaten Lampung Selatan) is a regency of Lampung, Sumatra, Indonesia, a strip of land surrounding the provincial capital of Bandar Lampung on its northern and eastern sides. The regency is bounded to the west by the new Pesawaran Regency, to the northeast by the East Lampung Regency, and to the south by the Sunda Strait; as such it is a major transit corridor to/from Java island. It has a land area of 2,227.38 km^{2}, and a population of 909,989 at the 2010 census and 1,064,301 at the 2020 census; the official estimate as of mid 2025 was 1,146,074 (comprising 582,291 males and 563,783 females). The administrative headquarters is in the town of Kalianda.

South Lampung Regency originally comprised a larger share of the area of Lampung Province, but on 3 January 1997 its far west districts were split off to create a new Tanggamus Regency (then including what later became a separate Pringsewu Regency in 2008), and on 14 August 2007 the western districts of the remaining South Lampung Regency were also split off to create a new Pesawaran Regency.

The regency has seen a population influx as migrants escape the crushing population densities and everyday struggles of living in the massive urban paralysis of Greater Jakarta, and along with Bandar Lampung city its character is increasingly reflecting the cosmopolitan makeup of Jakartans rather than the surrounds of a typical provincial capital and hinterland. This has resulted in flaring of ethnic tensions, including rioting.

== Administrative districts ==
South Lampung Regency consists of seventeen districts (kecamatan), tabulated below with their areas and their populations at the 2010 census and the 2020 census, together with the official estimates as of mid 2025. The districts are grouped below for descriptive convenience into a "Northern zone" comprising the heavily populated areas suburban to Bandar Lampung city, and to the city's north and east, and a "Southern zone" comprising the areas to the southeast of Bandar Lampung; these zones have no administrative significance. The table also includes the locations of the district administrative centres, the number of administrative villages in each district (a total of 256 rural desa and 4 urban kelurahan, the latter all in Kalianda District), and its post code.

| Kode Wilayah | Name of District (kecamatan) | Area in km^{2} | Pop'n census 2010 | Pop'n census 2020 | Pop'n estimate mid 2025 | Admin centre | No. of villages | Post code |
|---|---|---|---|---|---|---|---|---|
| 18.01.04 | Natar | 261.08 | 170,992 | 191,833 | 207,717 | Merak Batin | 26 | 35362 |
| 18.01.13 | Jati Agung | 250.18 | 103,038 | 128,604 | 132,897 | Marga Agung | 21 | 35365 |
| 18.01.05 | Tanjung Bintang | 165.95 | 68,572 | 82,184 | 91,447 | Jati Baru | 16 | 35361 |
| 18.01.22 | Tanjung Sari | 96.29 | 27,107 | 31,822 | 35,301 | Kerto Sari | 8 | 35360 |
| 18.01.18 | Murbau Mataram | 130.09 | 46,644 | 56,507 | 61,660 | Merbau Mataram | 15 | 35357 |
| | Northern zone | 903.58 | 416,353 | 490,950 | 529,022 | | 86 | |
| 18.01.08 | Katibung ^{(a)} | 161.98 | 61,422 | 72,563 | 77,809 | Tanjung Ratu | 12 | 35452 |
| 18.01.23 | Way Sulan | 46.77 | 21,264 | 24,326 | 26,557 | Karang Pucung | 8 | 35456 |
| 18.01.07 | Sidomulyo | 132.74 | 57,264 | 65,292 | 70,789 | Sidorejo | 16 | 35352 |
| 18.01.17 | Candipuro | 122.62 | 50,256 | 57,627 | 62,170 | Titiwangi | 14 | 35356 |
| 18.01.24 | Way Panji | 36.75 | 16,341 | 18,106 | 19,392 | Sidoharjo | 4 | 35354 |
| 18.01.06 | Kalianda | 176.00 | 81,126 | 94,127 | 101,919 | Kalianda | 29 ^{(b)} | 35551 |
| 18.01.16 | Rajabasa ^{(c)} | 120.96 | 20,769 | 24,849 | 26,303 | Banding | 16 | 35552 |
| 18.01.10 | Palas | 128.26 | 53,492 | 60,864 | 65,375 | Bangunan | 21 | 35594 |
| 18.01.15 | Sragi | 87.82 | 31,654 | 35,665 | 37,919 | Kuala Sekampung | 10 | 35597 |
| 18.01.09 | Penengahan | 106.31 | 35,672 | 42,260 | 45,640 | Pasuruan | 22 | 35593 |
| 18.01.14 | Ketapang ^{(d)} | 143.46 | 46,116 | 53,147 | 57,180 | Bangun Rejo | 17 | 35596 |
| 18.01.21 | Bakauheni ^{(e)} | 60.15 | 20,761 | 24,525 | 25,998 | Hatta | 5 | 35592 |
| | Southern zone | 1,323.80 | 496,137 | 573,351 | 617,052 | | 174 | |
| | Totals for regency | 2,227.38 | 912,490 | 1,064,301 | 1,146,074 | Kalianda | 260 | |

Notes: (a) the district includes 3 islands off the south coast of Sumatra. (b) including 4 urban kelurahan - Bumi Agung, Kalianda, Wai Lubuk and Wai Urang.
(c) the district includes 16 islands off the south coast of Sumatra, the largest being Pulau Sebesi (46.43 km^{2}), Pulau Sebuku (17.71 km^{2}), Pulau Krakatoa or Pulau Rakata (12.53 km^{2}), Pulau Sertung (10.57 km^{2}), Pulau Panjang (4.23 km^{2}) and Anak Krakatoa (2.63 km^{2}); the first two named lie southwest of the 'mainland' part of the district and comprise Tejang Pulau Sebesi desa, while the last four of these form the Krakatoa Archipelago further south.
(d) the district includes 11 islands off the south coast of Sumatra, the largest being Pulau Rimau Balak (3.15 km^{2}).
(e) the district includes 12 islands off the south coast of Sumatra, the largest being Pulau Kandang Balak (1.86 km^{2}).

The most populous villages in Natar District (with mid-2024 populations) are Merak Batin (17,496), Natar village (17,197), Negara Ratu (15,311), Hajimena (13,781), Candimas (12,519), Brantiraya (12,202) and Tanjungsari (11,659).
The most populous villages in Jati Agung District (in mid 2024) are Jatimulyo (20,082) and Karang Anyar (20,033). The most populous villages in Tanjung Bintang District (in mid 2024) are Serdang (12,217) and Jati Baru (11,527).
The most populous towns or villages in Kalianda District (also mid 2024) are the four kelurahan; Way Urang had 15,043 inhabitants, while Kalianda town had 5,746, Bumi Agung had 4,705 and Way Lubuk had 4,486.

== History ==
Tanggamus Regency, formerly the most western districts of South Lampung Regency, was separated from it on 3 January 1997. Pesawaran Regency, formerly the most southwestern districts remaining in South Lampung Regency lying to the southwest of Bandar Lampung, was carved out of it on 17 July 2007.

In January 2011, tens of thousands of inhabitants of South Lampung had to be evacuated by the South Lampung Disaster Mitigation Agency (BPBD) in the seven districts of Kalianda, Rajabasa, Katibung, Sidomulyo, Ketapang, Sragi and Palas due to volcanic ash from the Mount Anak Krakatau. There is an observation station at Hargopancuran village in South Lampung used to monitor activity.
