= Tanggamus Regency =

Regency in Lampung, Indonesia

Tanggamus Regency Kabupaten Tanggamus
- Regency
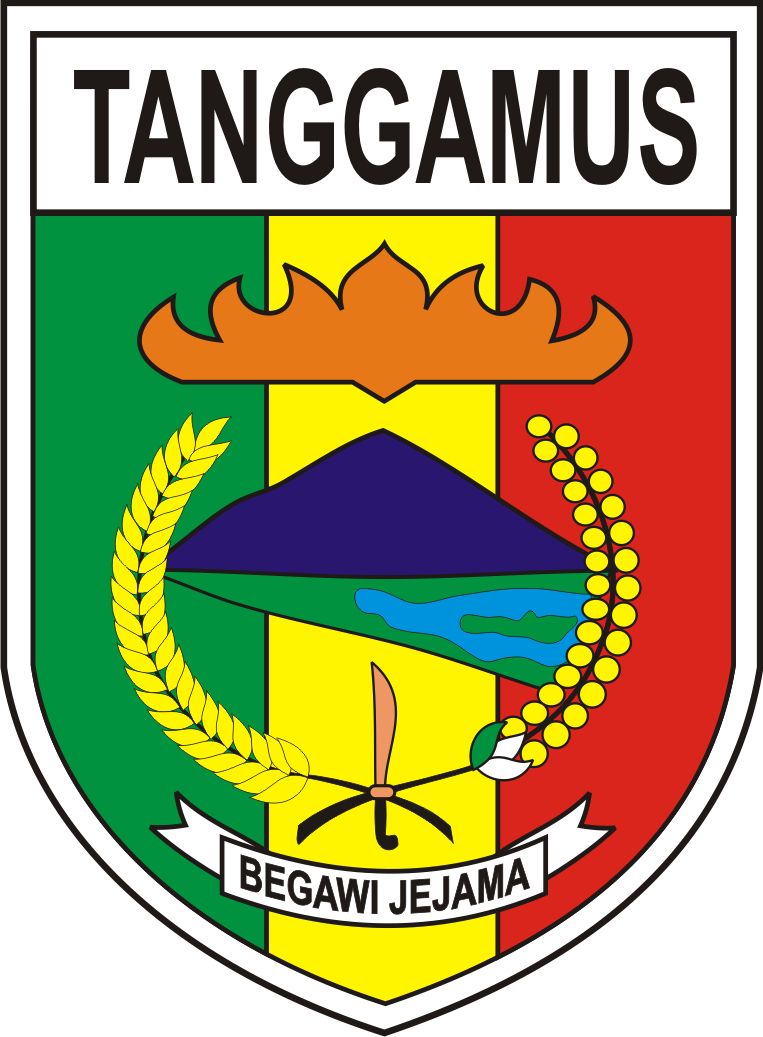
- Coat of arms
- Motto: Begawi Jejama (Working together)
- Location within Lampung

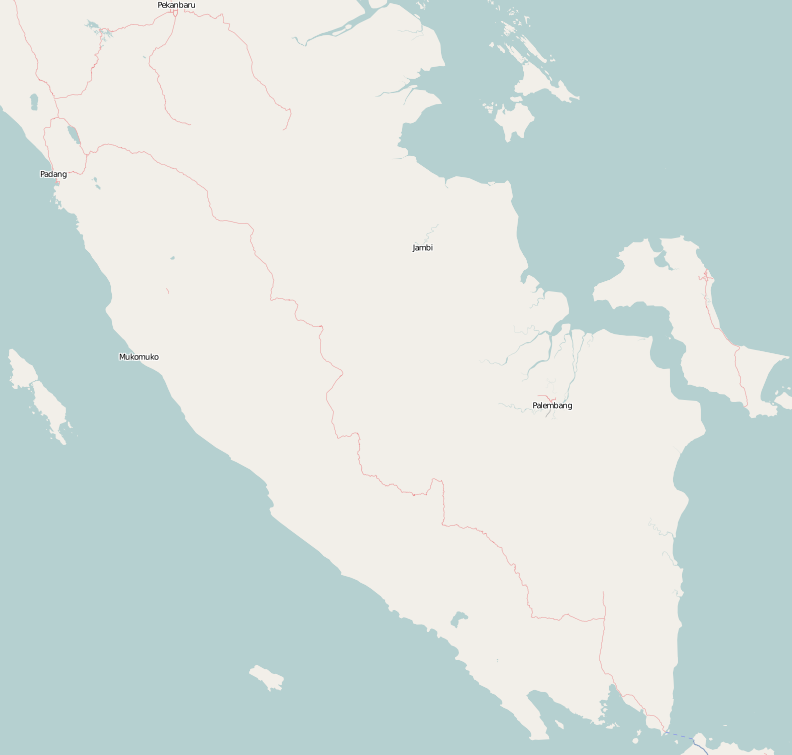
- Location in Southern Sumatra, Sumatra and Indonesia Tanggamus Regency (Sumatra) Tanggamus Regency (Indonesia)
- Coordinates: 5.3851°S 104.6235°E
- Country: Indonesia
- Province: Lampung
- Regency seat: Kota Agung Pusat

Government
  - Regent: Moh. Saleh Asnawi
  - Vice Regent: Agus Suranto

Area
  - Total: 4,747.06 km^{2} (1,832.85 sq mi)
  - Land: 2,947.57 km^{2} (1,138.06 sq mi)
  - Water: 1,799.5 km^{2} (694.8 sq mi)

Population (mid 2025 estimate)
  - Total: 678,021
  - Density: 230.027/km^{2} (595.767/sq mi)
- Time zone: UTC+7 (IWST)
- Area code: (+62) 722
- Website: tanggamus.go.id

Tanggamus Regency is a regency (kabupaten) of Lampung Province, Sumatra, Indonesia. It has an area of 4,747.06 km^{2} which consists of a land area of 2,947.57 km^{2} and a sea area of 1,799.5 km^{2} (the latter mainly comprising Semangka Bay, which is a major gulf from the sea). It had a population of 534,595 at the 2010 Census and 640,275 at the 2020 Census; the official estimate as of mid 2025 was 678,021 (comprising 349,575 males and 328,446 females). The regency seat is the town of Kota Agung Pusat. The regency was created on 21 March 1997 from what were previously the western districts of South Lampung Regency, but districts in its eastern part were split away on 29 October 2008 to form the new Pringsewu Regency. It lies in the southwest of the province, and surrounds Semangka Bay (Teluk Semangka) on its west, north and east coasts.

== Administrative districts ==
Tanggamus Regency is divided into twenty administrative districts (kecamatan), tabulated below with their total land areas (excluding the sea areas) and their populations at the 2010 Census and the 2020 Census, together with the official estimates as of mid 2025. The table also includes the locations of the district administrative centres, the number of villages in each district (a total of 299 rural desa and 3 urban kelurahan, the latter all in Kota Agung District), and its post code.

Kode Wilayah	Name of District (kecamatan)	Total Area in km^{2}	Pop'n Census 2010	Pop'n Census 2020	Pop'n Estimate mid 2025	Admin centre	No. of villages	Post code
18.06.03	Wonosobo	99.95	34,102	41,281	43,898	Tanjung Kurung	28	35685
18.06.12	Semaka	147.74	34,287	39,498	41,002	Sukaraja	22	35386
18.06.25	Bandar Negeri Semuong	182.05	18,213	17,282	17,537	Sanggi	11	35686
18.06.01	Kota Agung	64.68	39,386	47,147	49,866	Kuripan	16 ^{(a)}	35381
18.06.17	Pematang Sawa ^{(b)}	232.57	15,607	17,832	18,438	Way Nipah	14	35382
18.06.19	Kota Agung Timur (East Kota Agung)	90.09	17,645	21,581	23,062	Kagungan	12	35383
18.06.18	Kota Agung Barat (West Kota Agung)	44.53	20,749	22,839	23,187	Negara Batin	16	35384
18.06.04	Pulau Panggung (Panggung "Island")	131.27	31,906	40,310	43,757	Tekad	21	35678
18.06.15	Ulu Belu	649.03	38,718	43,803	45,068	Ngarip	16	35387
18.06.26	Air Naningan	321.59	27,051	31,237	32,458	Air Naningan	10	35679
18.06.02	Talang Padang	30.31	43,029	53,297	57,291	Talang Padang	20	35377
18.06.13	Sumberejo	55.89	31,146	36,056	37,521	Sumberejo	13	35374
18.06.20	Gisting	41.92	36,006	43,049	45,487	Kuta Dalom	9	35378
18.06.21	Gunung Alip	27.81	17,263	22,151	24,222	Banjar Negeri	12	35379
18.06.11	Pugung	216.43	51,832	66,185	72,194	Rantau Tijang	27	35675
18.06.27	Bulok	101.13	19,532	24,139	25,922	Sukamara	10	35682
18.06.09	Cukuh Balak ^{(c)}	199.65	21,087	24,846	26,073	Putih Doh	20	35683
18.06.17	Kelumbayan ^{(d)}	124.60	10,746	12,236	12,627	Napal	8	35388
18.06.24	Limau ^{(e)}	121.48	17,032	21,665	23,598	Kuripan	11	35613
18.06.28	Kelumbayan Barat (West Kelumbayan)	64.84	11,276	13,841	14,813	Sidoharjo	6	35389
	Totals	2,947.57	536,613	640,275	678,021	Kota Agung Pusat	302	

Notes: (a) includes the 3 kelurahan of Baros, Kuripan and Pasar Madang. (b) Pematang Sawa forms the entire west coast of Semangka Bay.
(c) includes the substantial island of Pulau Tabuan in the southern entrance to Semangka Bay, and three small offshore islands (Pulau Batucentigi, Pulau Batuputih and Pulau Karangputih).
(d) includes 25 small offshore islands. (e) includes the small offshore island of Pulau Batukerbau.

The last-named four districts in the table above comprise the eastern coast of Semangka Bay (including its hinterland).

== History ==
In the winter of 2009/2010, the regency suffered from flooding, which saw some 80 percent of the forest in Tanggamus severely damaged. Landslides occurred in the district of Semaka and the flooding drowned several elephants including one within the protected Bukit Barisan Selatan National Park and another at the Way Kerap dam in Tanggamus.

Bukit Barisan Selatan National Park is a National Park in the area. A Tropical Forest World Heritage Site, Bukit Barisan has a total area of 3,568 km2.

The district has a land area of 2,947.57 square km with a population density of around 227 people/square km, and was inaugurated on 3 January 1997, based on Law Number 2 of 1997.

== Tourist attractions ==
- Kiluan Bay
- Gigi Hiu Beach
- Tanggamus Mountain
- Sawmiil Beach
- Way Lalaan Waterfall
- Jarum Lebuay Waterfall
- Batutegi Dam
- Lembah Pelangi Waterfall
