= Metro City (Indonesia) =

City in Lampung, Indonesia

Metro
- City
- City of Metro; Kota Metro
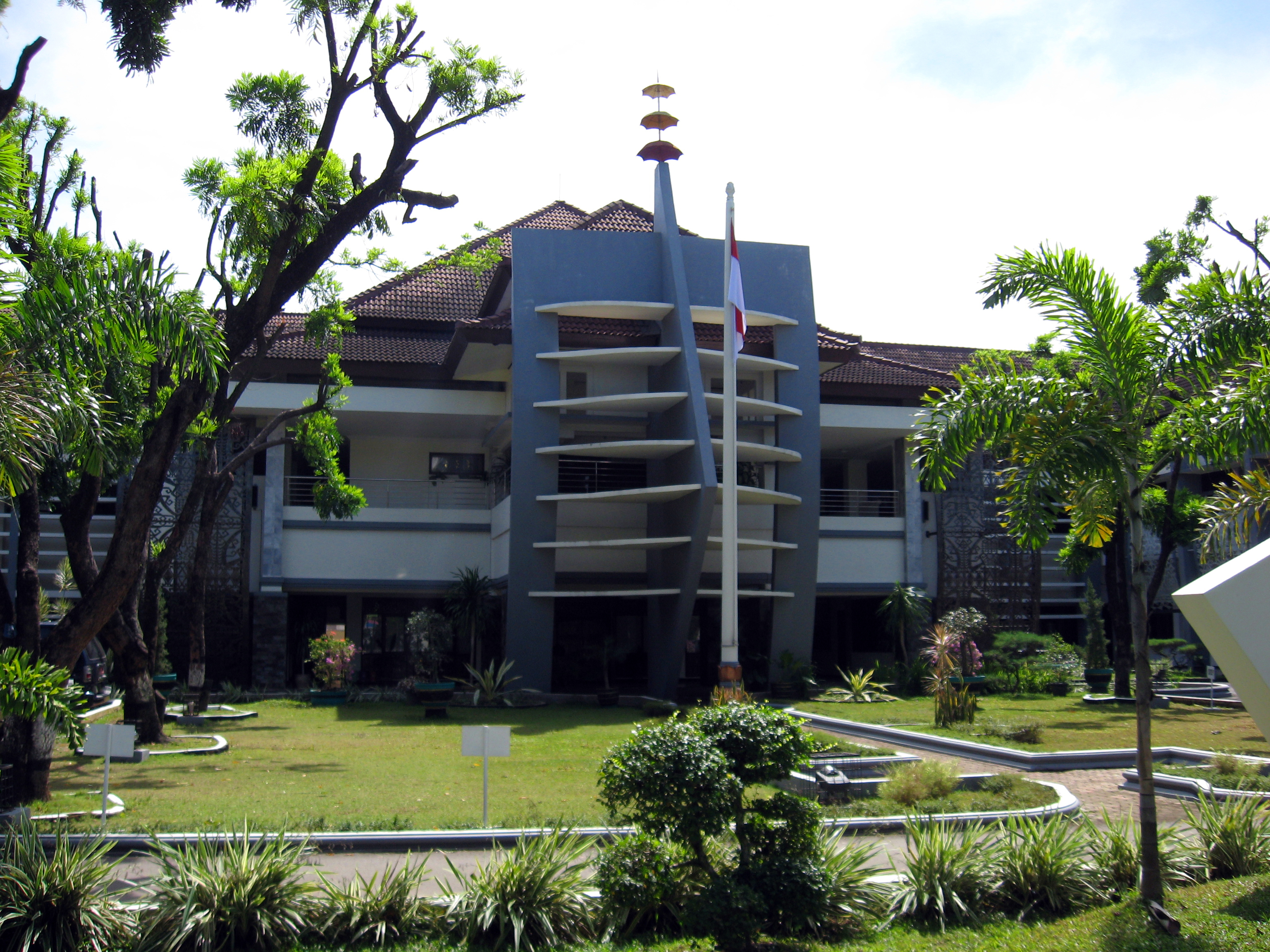
- Metro's mayor's office

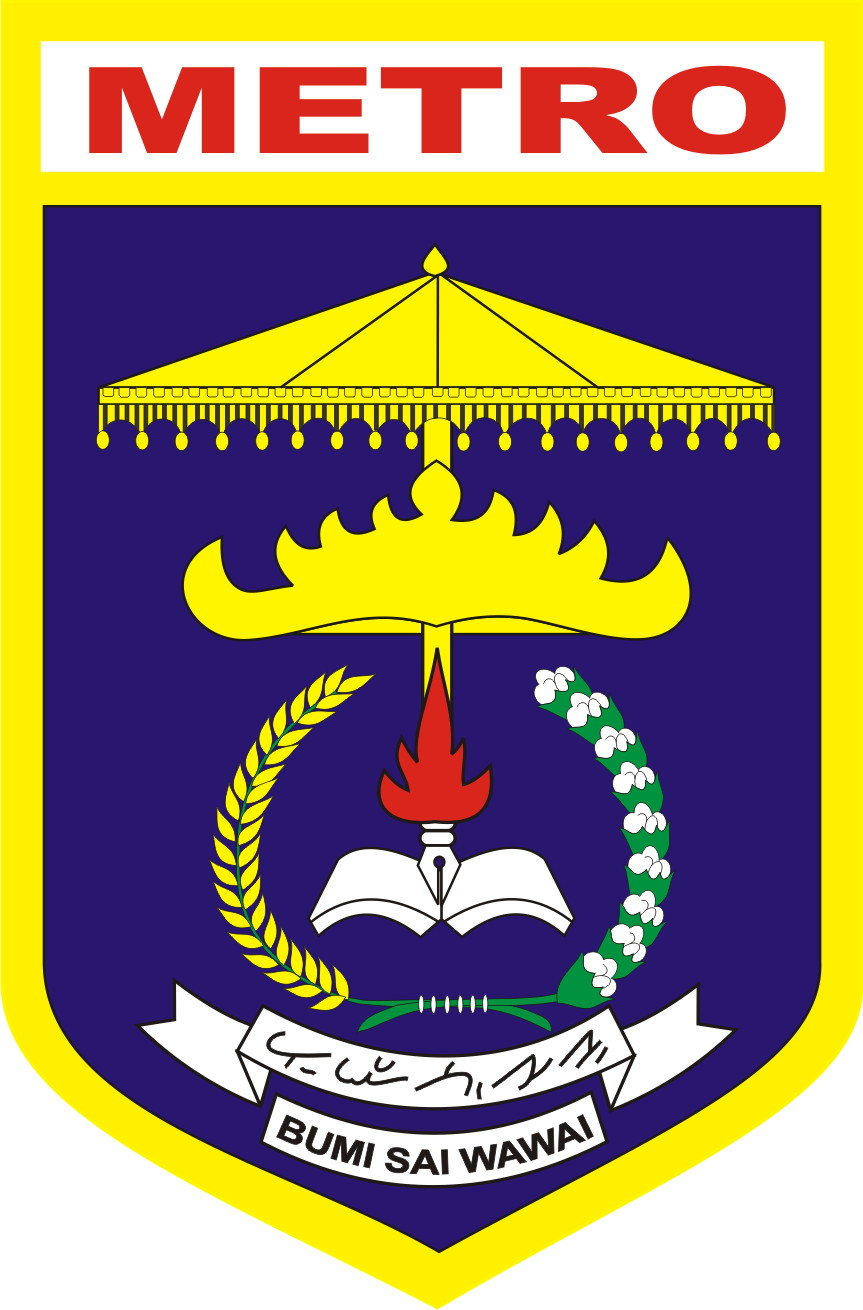
- Coat of arms
- Motto(s): Bumi Sai Wawai (Lampungese); The Beautiful Land
- Location within Lampung

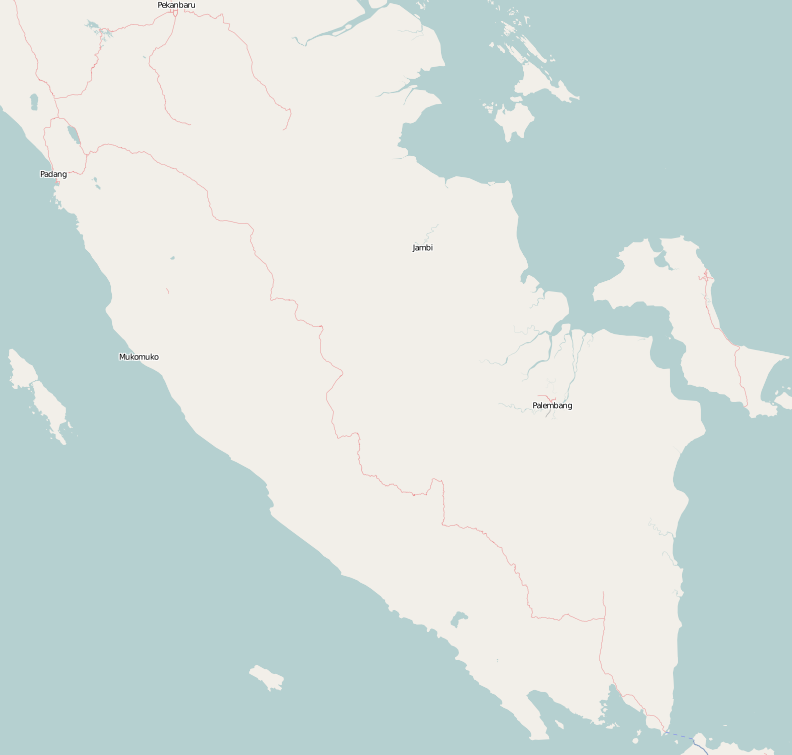
- Location in Southern Sumatra, Sumatra and Indonesia Metro (Sumatra) Metro (Indonesia)
- Coordinates: 5°7′S 105°18′E
- Country: Indonesia
- Province: Lampung
- Settlement commenced: 1939
- Administrative city: 14 August 1986
- Autonomous city: 9 June 1999

Government
  - Mayor: Bambang Iman Santoso
  - Vice Mayor: Muhammad Rafieq Adi Pradana

Area
  - Total: 73.21 km^{2} (28.27 sq mi)
- Elevation: 30–60 m (98–197 ft)

Population (mid 2025 estimate)
  - Total: 183,746
  - Density: 2,510/km^{2} (6,500/sq mi)
- Time zone: UTC+7 (Indonesia Western Time)
- Area code: (+62) 725
- Vehicle registration: BE
- Website: metrokota.go.id

Metro (Indonesian pronunciation: [me'tro]) is a city in the Indonesian province of Lampung. It is 52 km (32 mi) away from Bandar Lampung City (the provincial capital), and is the second-largest city in Lampung province, with 183,746 inhabitants as at mid 2025. This city is also the city that has the lowest congestion rate in Lampung Province. Metro is included in the List of 10 cities in Indonesia with the 9th lowest cost of living in Indonesia and second on Sumatra Island based on the Indonesia Central Bureau of Statistics (BPS) Survey in 2017. Metro is also a blueprint target of the Ministry of Public Works and Public Housing of Indonesia as a strategic area and a metropolitan development target after Bandar Lampung.

== Etymology ==
The first version of the name Metro comes from the word "Meterm" in Dutch which means "center" which means in the middle between Central Lampung and East Lampung, even in the middle (center) of Lampung Province. The second version of the name Metro comes from the word "Mitro" (Javanese) which means friends, partners, associations, this was motivated by colonization coming from various regions outside Sumatra that entered Lampung. But the most relevant was Metro was from Dutch, it was strongly supported with its history and the establishment of a landmark in the form of a tower called the Meterm Tower in the Merdeka Park, Metro City Square.

== History ==
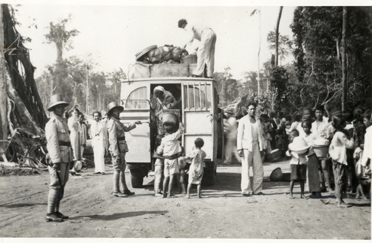
Settlers arrive in Metro, c. 1939

Prior to 1936, Trimurjo was part of Gunungsugih onder district; it was isolated, without much influence from the indigenous Lampungese people. However, beginning in 1936 the Dutch colonial government sent Javanese migrants to colonise the area, which served to relieve overpopulation on Java, and mitigate the influence of Indonesian independence activists. The first group arrived on 4 April 1936.

On 9 June 1937, the name of the area was changed from Trimurjo to Metro and that same year it was established as a separate onder district, with Raden Mas Sudarto as the first assistant district chief. During this same period the Dutch colonial government built more roads, as well as a clinic, police office, and administrative offices. By 1941 a mosque, post office, large market, and inn had been built, and electricity and telephone lines had been installed.

Development soon outpaced the natural irrigation capabilities of the area. To ensure proper healthy crops, the Dutch hired Ir. Swam to design an irrigation system. His design called for a levee as well as a 30-metre-wide (98 ft) and 10-metre-deep (33 ft) irrigation canal from Way Sekampung River to Metro. Labour was provided by the migrants, who were conscripted and worked in shifts. Construction began in 1937 and was finished in 1941.

After the Japanese invasion of Indonesia in 1942, all Dutch personnel were evacuated or captured. The migration program was continued under the name imin kakari, and seventy Javanese migrants were used as forced labour in the construction of the nearby Natar and Astra Ksetra airstrips as well as numerous bunkers and other strategic assets; those who resisted were shot.

The remaining citizens were malnourished, with their harvests being taken by the Japanese occupying forces. Diseases spread rampantly throughout the populace, carried by ticks. Deaths were common, as were women, including wives of the forced labourers, being taken as comfort women.

During the Indonesian war of independence, the Dutch attempted to retake Metro. When they first arrived, they were unable to enter as the bridge to the city in Tempuran had been destroyed by a 26-man troop of the Indonesian army, under the command of Second Lieutenant Bursyah; the Dutch convoy was forced to retreat. However, the following day the Dutch returned in greater numbers and attacked from Tegineneng, eventually entering the city and killing three Indonesian soldiers.

Upon entering the city, the Dutch forces were besieged by sabotage by 41 soldiers under the command of Second Lieutenant Raden Sudarto. After chasing Sudarto's forces throughout the area, the Dutch continued to Palembang. Despite an extended guerrilla campaign by the Indonesian military, the Dutch eventually retook Metro in 1949, surrendering it that same year.

After the war, Metro continued to develop. In 1956, its government was stylized as a negeri based on Governor's Decree Number 153/D/1956. This led to adat lands being owned by the local government.

In 1976 Metro became the capital of the newly formed Central Lampung Regency, which at the time included parts of present-day East Lampung Regency.

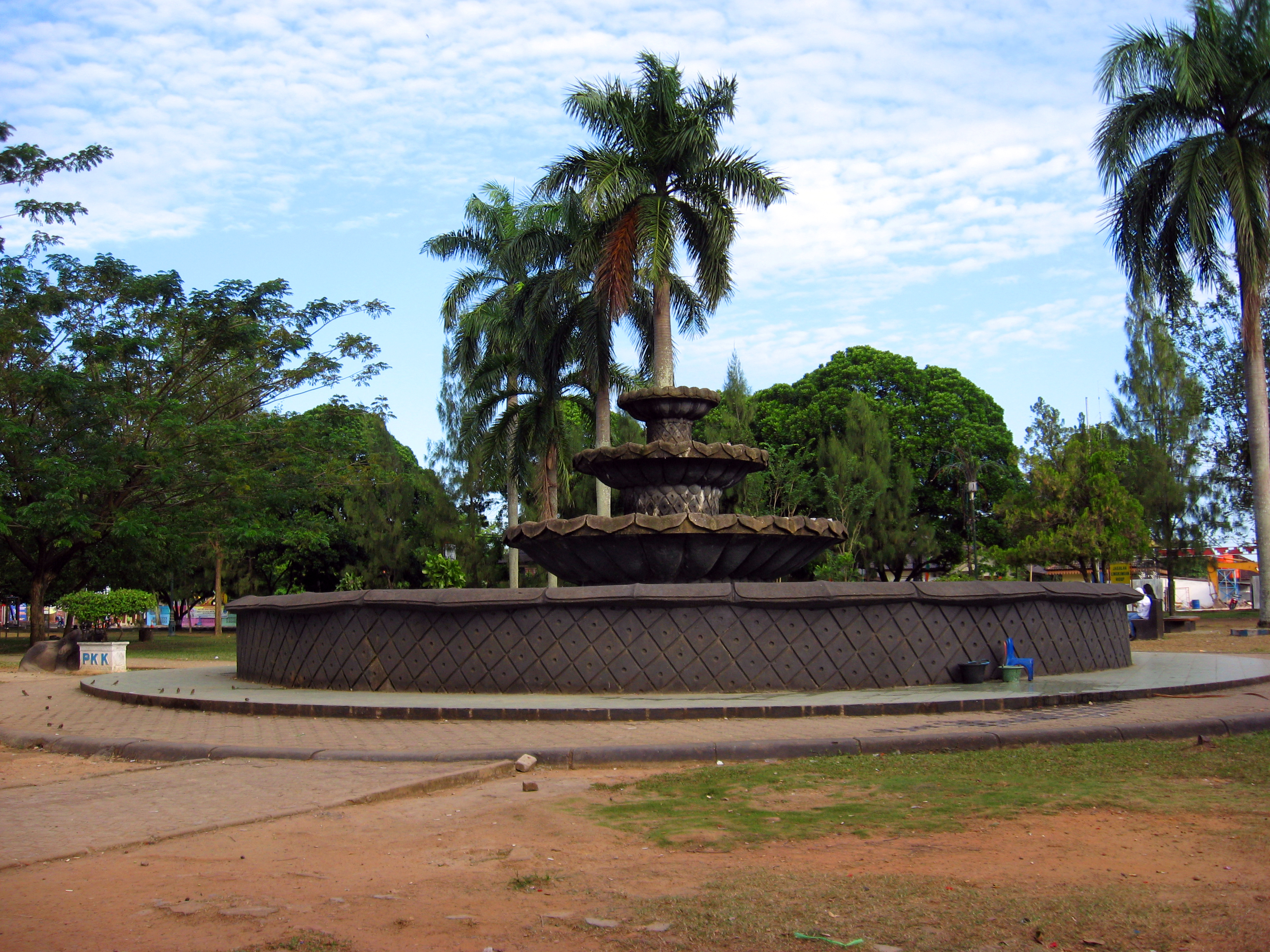
This fountain is one of the additions to the town square and has now been replaced by the Magnificent Meterm Tower.

Beginning in 1985, the local government began working to stimulate the economy. Retail chains began entering the city, a movie theatre and stadium was built, the town square was redesigned as a park, and Cendrawasih market was renovated.

On 14 August 1986, Metro was designated an administrative city, in accordance with Government Decree Number 34 of 1986, with the formal ceremony taking place on 6 September 1987.

Metro was established as an autonomous city (kota) with the passing of Law Number 12 of 1999 on 27 April 1999, with Gunung Sugih becoming the capital of Central Lampung. The first mayor after Metro's establishment as an autonomous city was Mozes Herman, with Lukman Hakim as vice-mayor.

== Geography and climate ==
Metro is spread over an area of 73.21 square kilometres (28.27 mi^{2}), with the built up area consisting of 24.57% of the city, or 16.88 square kilometres (6.52 mi^{2}). As of 2010, it had a population of 145,346, with a density of 2,116.2 people per km^{2} (5,480.9/sq mi); the 2020 census resulted in a population of 168,676, giving a density of 2,453.8 people per km^{2} (6,355.5/sq mi). The official estimate of population as at mid 2025 was 183,746 (comprising 92,415 males and 91,331 females).

The city is built around the Dutch land use planning system. Its economic and political hub is in the center, in the area around the city park. All five provincial and national roads that transect Metro meet in this area. Northern Metro is a residential area, while western Metro is used for commercial space, southern Metro for agriculture, and parts of southern and eastern Metro for educational and other public facilities.

The land in Metro is relatively flat, with an elevation of between 30 and 60 metres (98–197 ft). When it was first settled, the area was heavily forested; there are still pockets of forest within the city limits.

The climate in Metro is humid and tropical. The average air temperature is between 26 and 28 °C (79 and 82 °F), with an average humidity of 80 to 88% and an average yearly precipitation of 2,264 to 2,868 millimetres (89.1 to 112.9 in). The dry season usually lasts from September until May.

== Administrative divisions ==
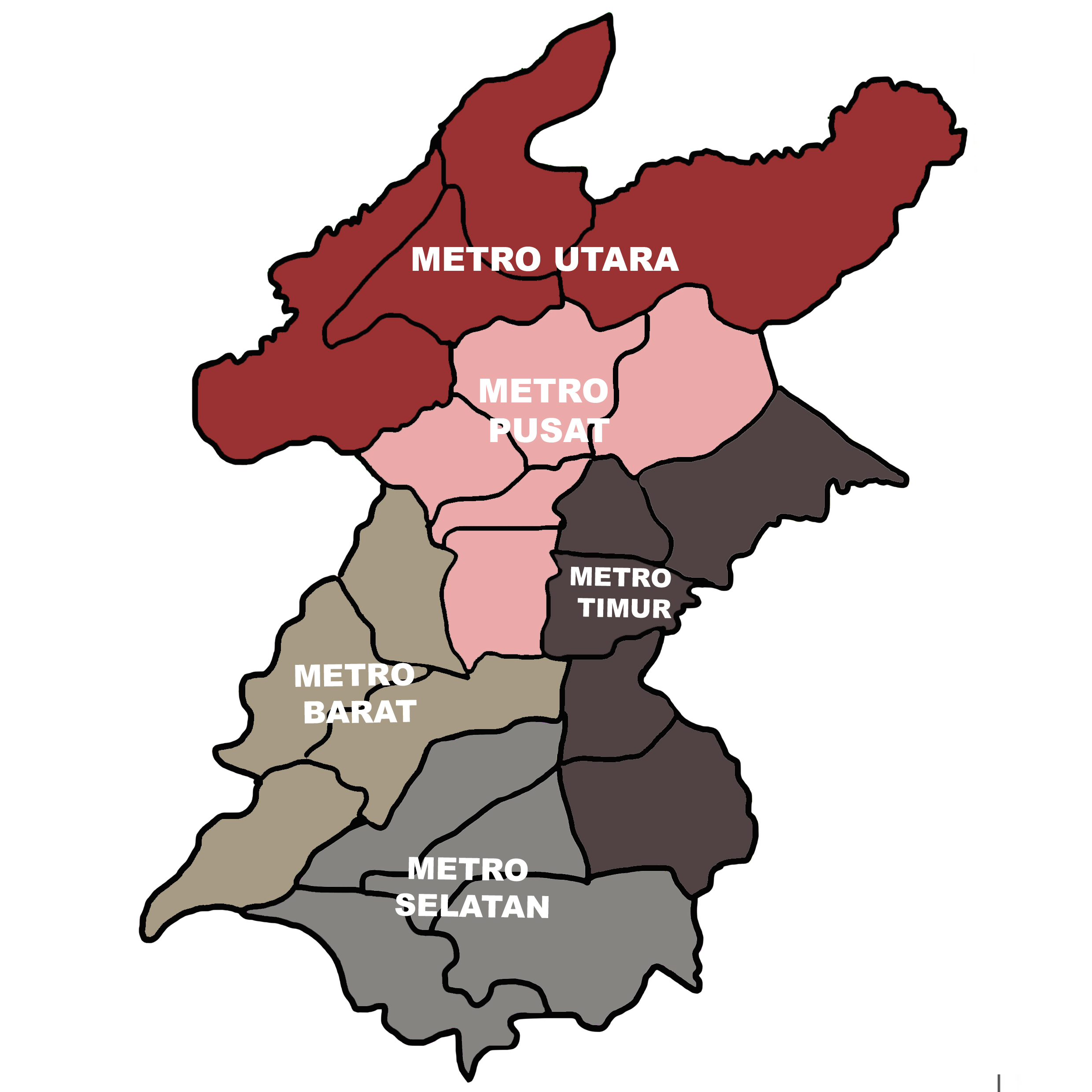
District divisions of Metro

When Metro was originally made an autonomous city, it had two kecamatan, or administrative districts, Metro Raya and Metro Bantul. However, it now is divided into five districts (kecamatan), tabulated below with their populations at the 2010 census and at the 2020 census, together with the official estimates as at mid 2025. The table also includes the number of administrative villages in each district (all classed as urban kelurahan).

| Kode Wilayah | Name of District (kecamatan) | Area in km^{2} | Pop'n 2010 census | Pop'n 2020 census | Pop'n mid 2025 estimate | No. of villages | Post codes |
|---|---|---|---|---|---|---|---|
| 18.72.05 | Metro Selatan (South Metro) | 15.03 | 14,144 | 17,385 | 18,959 | 4 | 34119, 34121, 34122, 34123 |
| 18.72.03 | Metro Barat (West Metro) | 11.54 | 25,246 | 28,424 | 29,830 | 4 | 34114 & 34125 |
| 18.72.04 | Metro Timur (East Metro) | 12.89 | 34,966 | 38,154 | 41,988 | 5 | 34111, 34112, 34124 |
| 18.72.01 | Metro Pusat (Central Metro) | 11.60 | 46,170 | 52,635 | 57,003 | 5 | 34111 & 34113 |
| 18.72.02 | Metro Utara (North Metro) | 22.15 | 24,945 | 32,078 | 35,966 | 4 | 34117 - 34119 |
| | Total city | 73.21 | 145,346 | 168,676 | 183,746 | 22 | |

The five districts are subdivided into 22 administrative urban villages (kelurahan), each listed with its population at the 2010 census and at the mid 2024 official estimates, together with its postal code.

| Kecamatan | Kelurahan | Pop'n census 2010 | Pop'n estimate mid 2024 | Post code |
|---|---|---|---|---|
| Metro Selatan | Sumbersari | 2,881 | 3,700 | 34122 |
| " | Rejomulyo | 4,302 | 5,858 | 34123 |
| " | Margodadi | 2,574 | 3,270 | 34119 |
| " | Margorejo | 4,387 | 5,934 | 34121 |
| Metro Barat | Mulyojati | 8,035 | 8,578 | 34125 |
| " | Mulyosari | 2,798 | 3,704 | 34125 |
| " | Ganjar Agung | 6,136 | 7,266 | 34114 |
| " | Ganjar Asri | 8,277 | 10,093 | 34125 |
| Metro Timur | Tejosari | 2,738 | 3,897 | 34124 |
| " | Tejo Agung | 5,346 | 7,000 | 34112 |
| " | Iringmulyo | 12,425 | 13,535 | 34112 |
| " | Yosorejo | 6,672 | 7,155 | 34112 |
| " | Yosodadi | 7,785 | 10,171 | 34111 |
| Metro Pusat | Metro (kelurahan) | 13,425 | 14,786 | 34111 |
| " | Imopuro | 6,616 | 6,367 | 34111 |
| " | Hadimulyo Barat | 11,696 | 13,564 | 34113 |
| " | Hadimulyo Timur | 7,333 | 11,208 | 34113 |
| " | Yosomulyo | 7,100 | 10,757 | 35111 |
| Metro Utara | Banjarsari | 9,309 | 13,126 | 34117 |
| " | Purwosari | 4,860 | 6,684 | 34118 |
| " | Purwoasri | 3,356 | 4,967 | 34117 |
| " | Karangrejo | 7,420 | 10,673 | 34119 |

== Economy ==
In 2002, Metro had a budget of Rp 336 billion (US$37.3 million). The largest contributor to Metro's economy is the service sector, contributing 22.94% of the city's income in 2002.

The second largest contributor to Metro's economy is retail, contributing 19.77% of the city's 2002 income. In 2004, there were 13 markets, 1,881 stores, and 682 food kiosks, as well as numerous street vendors.

The third largest economic sector is agriculture, contributing 17.31% of the 2002 income. Within the city boundaries there are 3,342 hectares of rice fields, capable of producing up to 16,598 tons of rice per growing season.

Numerous banks have branches in Metro, including Bank Mandiri, Bank Lampung, Bank Danamon, Bank Eka, Bank Central Asia, Bank Rakyat Indonesia, Bank Maybank Indonesia, and as well as Bank Negara Indonesia.

== Healthcare ==
Metro is served by three hospitals: Ahmad Yani General Hospital, Mardi Waluyo Hospital, Muhammadiyah Hospital, and Metro Islamic Hospital. As of 2003, the total number of health care practitioners in Metro is 382, including 13 specialists, 30 general practitioners, 36 midwives, 121 nurses, and 8 dentists. There are also 19 pharmacies and 8 drug stores.

== Education ==
Metro is served by numerous public and private schools. There are 63 elementary schools, 25 junior high schools (eight public and seventeen private), two junior high schools for special-needs children, 16 senior high schools, and 15 vocational schools.

=== Public universities ===
- Metro State Islamic Institute (UIN Jurai Siwo Lampung)
- Lampung University (Faculty of Primary School Teacher Education)
- Polytechnic of Health Ministry of Health Tanjung Karang (Majoring Midwifery)

=== Private colleges and academies ===
- Muhammadiyah University Metro (UM metro)
- Tarbiyah College of Sciences Agus Salim
- NU Ma'arif Islamic Institute (IAIMNU)
- Dharma Wacana College of Agriculture
- Dharma Wacana Academy of Agriculture
- Dharma Wacana College
- Wirabuana Metro Midwifery Academy
- Dharma Wacana Nursing Academy
- High School Sports (STKIP Rosalia)

== Bibliography ==
- Prahana, Naim Empel (1997). Cerita rakyat dari Lampung [Folklore from Lampung] (in Indonesian). Vol. 2. Jakarta: Gramedia Widiasarana Indonesia. ISBN 979-669-015-2.
- Sudarmono; Edi Ribut Harwanto, eds. (2004). Metro: Desa Kolonis Menuju Metropolis [Metro: A Colonial Village Becoming Metropolitan] (in Indonesian). Metro, Indonesia: Bagian Humas dan Protokol Setda Kota Metro.
