= List of regencies and cities in South Sumatra =

This is a list of regencies and cities in South Sumatra province. As of October 2019, there were 13 regencies and 4 cities.

#	Regency/ City	Capital	Regent/ Mayor	Area (km^{2})	Population (2019)	District	Kelurahan (urban village)/ Desa (village)	Logo	Location map
1	Banyuasin Regency	Pangkalan Balai	Askolani Jasi	11.832,99	810.222	19	16/288		
2	Empat Lawang Regency	Tebing Tinggi	Joncik Muhammad	2.256,44	332.515	10	9/147		
3	Lahat Regency	Lahat	Cik Ujang	5.311,74	432.957	24	18/360		
4	Muara Enim Regency	Muara Enim	Juarsah	7.383,90	576.105	20	10/245		
5	Musi Banyuasin Regency	Sekayu	Dodi Reza Alex Noerdin	14.266,26	574.415	14	13/227		
6	Musi Rawas Regency	Muara Beliti Baru	Hendra Gunawan	6.350,10	408.816	14	13/186		
7	Musi Rawas Utara Regency	Rupit	Syarif Hidayat	6.008,55	192.164	7	7/82		
8	Ogan Ilir Regency	Indralaya	Ilyas Panji Alam	2.666,09	409.310	16	14/227		
9	Ogan Komering Ilir Regency	Kota Kayu Agung	Iskandar	18.359,04	727.789	18	13/314		
10	Ogan Komering Ulu Regency	Baturaja	Kuryana Aziz	4.797,06	363.885	13	14/143		
11	Ogan Komering Ulu Selatan Regency	Muaradua	Popo Ali Martopo	5.493,94	414.252	19	7/252		
12	Ogan Komering Ulu Timur Regency	Martapura	Kholid Mawardi	3.370,00	639.112	20	7/305		
13	Penukal Abab Lematang Ilir Regency	Talang Ubi	Heri Amalindo	1.840,00	177.111	5	6/65		
14	Lubuklinggau	-	SN Prana Putra Sohe	401,50	224.032	8	72/-		
15	Pagar Alam	-	Alfian Maskoni	633,66	145.549	5	35/-		
16	Palembang	-	Harnojoyo	369,22	1.592.248	18	107/-		
17	Prabumulih	-	Ridho Yahya	251,94	197.069	6	25/12		
