= 2024–25 Liga 4 South Sumatra =

Liga 4 South Sumatra
- Season: 2024–25
- Dates: 9–26 February 2025
- Champions: PS Palembang (1st title)
- National phase: PS Palembang; KMP Bumara
- Matches: 42
- Goals: 161 (3.83 per match)
- Biggest win: PS Palembang 9–1 Bhayangkara Sriwijaya (23 February 2025)
- Highest scoring: PS Palembang 9–1 Bhayangkara Sriwijaya (23 February 2025)

The 2024–25 Liga 4 South Sumatra was the inaugural season of Liga 4 South Sumatra after the change in the structure of Indonesian football competition and serves as a qualifying round for the national phase of the 2024–25 Liga 4. The competition is organised by the South Sumatra Provincial PSSI Association.

== Teams ==
=== Name changes ===
- Ex-Simbels Arsyfa officially changed their name to Ex-Simbels Hastiguna at the start of this season, under the stewardship of Brimob.
- PS Tria officially changed their name to PersiOKUT Tria at the start of this season and relocated their home base to East Ogan Komering Ulu Regency.

=== Participating teams ===
A total of 11 teams are competing in this season.

No	Team	Location	2023–24 season
1	Persimuba	Musi Banyuasin Regency	Fourth place
2	PS Banyuasin	Banyuasin Regency	—
3	Bhayangkara Sriwijaya	Palembang City	Runner-up
4	David	Palembang City	Third place
5	Ex-Simbels Hastiguna	Palembang City	—
6	FISIP UNSRI United	Palembang City	—
7	KMP Bumara	Palembang City	—
8	PS Palembang	Palembang City	Champions
9	Persipra	Prabumulih City	—
10	Porsiba	Muara Enim Regency	—
11	PersiOKUT Tria	East Ogan Komering Ulu Regency	—

=== Personnel and kits ===
Note: Flags indicate national team as has been defined under FIFA eligibility rules. Players and coaches may hold more than one non-FIFA nationality.

Team	Head coach	Captain	Kit manufacturer	Main kit sponsor	Other kit sponsor(s)
Persimuba	(Indonesia) Sunarnan		(Indonesia) Amrta	Bank Sumsel Babel	List: Front: Petromuba; Back: None; Sleeves: None; Shorts: None
PS Banyuasin	(Indonesia) Endro Sukoco		(Indonesia) Made by club	Askab Banyuasin	List: Front: Back: Sleeves: Shorts:
Bhayangkara Sriwijaya	(Indonesia) Reza Resah Pratama		(Indonesia) Cecy Sport (H) (Indonesia) CRV (A)	BNI (H)	List: Front: Back: Sleeves: Shorts:
David	(Indonesia) Argema				List: Front: Back: Sleeves: Shorts:
Ex-Simbels Hastiguna	(Indonesia) Pani Frayoga			Ayam Emas	List: Front: Mangix Design; Back: Sleeves: Shorts:
FISIP UNSRI United	(Indonesia) Muhammad Patra		(Indonesia) JSP Apparel	FISIP United Universitas Sriwijaya	List: Front: Back: Sleeves: Shorts:
KMP Bumara	(Indonesia) Ardi Hernando			PT Gilang Nuansa Gemilang	List: Front: Bungsu Lima Bersaudara, KMP Property; Back: Sleeves: Shorts:
PS Palembang	(Indonesia) Jarot		(Indonesia) XTen	None	List: Front: None; Back: Betaji; Sleeves: None; Shorts: None
Persipra	(Indonesia) Bagus Meiranda		(United States) Nike (fake)	None	List: Front: Back: Sleeves: Shorts:
Porsiba	(Indonesia) Agustin	(Indonesia) Sahbandi	(Indonesia) Novac	Bukit Asam	List: Front: None; Back: None; Sleeves: None; Shorts: None
PersiOKUT Tria	(Indonesia) Djoko Nugroho		(Indonesia) Made by club	Boju Group	List: Front: Bank Sumsel Babel; Back: Sleeves: Shorts:

== Schedule ==
The schedule of the competition is as follows.

Round	Matchday	Date
First round	Matchday 1	9 February 2025
First round	Matchday 2	11 February 2025
First round	Matchday 3	12 February 2025
First round	Matchday 4	14 February 2025
First round	Matchday 5	15 February 2025
Second round	Matchday 1	17 February 2025
Second round	Matchday 2	18 February 2025
Second round	Matchday 3	20 February 2025
Second round	Matchday 4	21 February 2025
Second round	Matchday 5	23 February 2025
Finals	Leg 1	25 February 2025
Finals	Leg 2	26 February 2025

== First round ==
The draw for the first round took place on 25 January 2025 in Palembang, where 11 teams were divided into two groups. The first round will be played in a home tournament format of single round-robin matches.

The top three teams of each group will qualify for the second round.

=== Group A ===
All matches will be held at Jakabaring Baseball Field, Palembang.

Pos	Team	Pld	W	D	L	GF	GA	GD	Pts	Qualification	KMP	PAL	MBA	OKU	BAN	PRA
1	KMP Bumara	5	5	0	0	25	3	+22	15	Qualification to the Second round	—	2–0	—	7–1	—	4–0
2	PS Palembang	5	3	1	1	15	4	+11	10	Qualification to the Second round	—	—	—	3–0	8–0	3–1
3	Persimuba	5	2	2	1	10	8	+2	8	Qualification to the Second round	0–5	1–1	—	—	—	5–0
4	PersiOKUT Tria	5	1	2	2	7	14	−7	5		—	—	1–1	—	2–2	—
5	PS Banyuasin	5	1	1	3	8	20	−12	4		2–7	—	1–3	—	—	—
6	Persipra	5	0	0	5	2	18	−16	0		—	—	—	1–3	0–3	—

Source: Liga 4 South Sumatra
Rules for classification: 1) Points; 2) Head-to-head points; 3) Head-to-head goal difference; 4) Head-to-head goals scored; 5) Goal difference; 6) Goals scored; 7) Fair-play points; 8) Draw.

==== Group A Matches ====
Matchday 1 (9 February 2025)
9 February 2025
08:00 WIB (UTC+7)

PS Palembang	8–0	PS Banyuasin
	Report

Jakabaring Baseball Field, Palembang
9 February 2025
13:30 WIB (UTC+7)

Persimuba	0–5	KMP Bumara
	Report

Jakabaring Baseball Field, Palembang
9 February 2025
15:30 WIB (UTC+7)

Persipra	1–3	PersiOKUT Tria
	Report

Jakabaring Baseball Field, Palembang

Matchday 2 (11 February 2025)
11 February 2025
08:00 WIB (UTC+7)

PersiOKUT Tria	2–2	PS Banyuasin
	Report

Jakabaring Baseball Field, Palembang
11 February 2025
13:30 WIB (UTC+7)

KMP Bumara	4–0	Persipra
	Report

Jakabaring Baseball Field, Palembang
11 February 2025
15:30 WIB (UTC+7)

Persimuba	1–1	PS Palembang
	Report

Jakabaring Baseball Field, Palembang

Matchday 3 (12 February 2025)
12 February 2025
08:00 WIB (UTC+7)

PS Palembang	3–1	Persipra
	Report

Jakabaring Baseball Field, Palembang
12 February 2025
13:30 WIB (UTC+7)

KMP Bumara	7–1	PersiOKUT Tria
	Report

Jakabaring Baseball Field, Palembang
12 February 2025
15:30 WIB (UTC+7)

PS Banyuasin	1–3	Persimuba
	Report

Jakabaring Baseball Field, Palembang

Matchday 4 (14 February 2025)
14 February 2025
08:00 WIB (UTC+7)

KMP Bumara	2–0	PS Palembang
	Report

Jakabaring Baseball Field, Palembang
14 February 2025
13:30 WIB (UTC+7)

Persipra	0–3	PS Banyuasin
	Report

Jakabaring Baseball Field, Palembang
14 February 2025
15:30 WIB (UTC+7)

PersiOKUT Tria	1–1	Persimuba
	Report

Jakabaring Baseball Field, Palembang

Matchday 5 (15 February 2025)
15 February 2025
08:00 WIB (UTC+7)

Persimuba	5–0	Persipra
	Report

Jakabaring Baseball Field, Palembang
15 February 2025
13:30 WIB (UTC+7)

PS Banyuasin	2–7	KMP Bumara
	Report

Jakabaring Baseball Field, Palembang
15 February 2025
15:30 WIB (UTC+7)

PS Palembang	3–0	PersiOKUT Tria
	Report

Jakabaring Baseball Field, Palembang

=== Group B ===
All matches will be held at Jakabaring Archery Field, Palembang.

Pos	Team	Pld	W	D	L	GF	GA	GD	Pts	Qualification	PBA	BHA	DFC	EXS	FSP
1	Porsiba	4	3	1	0	13	3	+10	10	Qualification to the Second round	—	—	5–1	2–0	—
2	Bhayangkara Sriwijaya	4	2	2	0	7	4	+3	8	Qualification to the Second round	2–2	—	—	1–0	—
3	David	4	2	1	1	9	10	−1	7	Qualification to the Second round	—	2–2	—	—	3–2
4	Ex-Simbels Hastiguna	4	1	0	3	4	8	−4	3		—	—	1–3	—	3–2
5	FISIP UNSRI United	4	0	0	4	4	12	−8	0		0–4	0–2	—	—	—

Source: Liga 4 South Sumatra
Rules for classification: 1) Points; 2) Head-to-head points; 3) Head-to-head goal difference; 4) Head-to-head goals scored; 5) Goal difference; 6) Goals scored; 7) Fair-play points; 8) Draw

==== Group B Matches ====
Matchday 1 (9 February 2025)
9 February 2025
13:30 WIB (UTC+7)

Ex-Simbels Hastiguna	3–2	FISIP UNSRI United
	Report

Jakabaring Archery Field, Palembang
9 February 2025
15:30 WIB (UTC+7)

Porsiba	5–1	David
	Report

Jakabaring Archery Field, Palembang

Matchday 2 (11 February 2025)
11 February 2025
13:30 WIB (UTC+7)

Bhayangkara Sriwijaya	1–0	Ex-Simbels Hastiguna
	Report

Jakabaring Archery Field, Palembang
11 February 2025
15:30 WIB (UTC+7)

David	3–2	FISIP UNSRI United
	Report

Jakabaring Archery Field, Palembang

Matchday 3 (12 February 2025)
12 February 2025
13:30 WIB (UTC+7)

FISIP UNSRI United	0–2	Bhayangkara Sriwijaya
	Report

Jakabaring Archery Field, Palembang
12 February 2025
15:30 WIB (UTC+7)

Porsiba	2–0	Ex-Simbels Hastiguna
	Report

Jakabaring Archery Field, Palembang

Matchday 4 (14 February 2025)
14 February 2025
13:30 WIB (UTC+7)

Ex-Simbels Hastiguna	1–3	David
	Report

Jakabaring Archery Field, Palembang
14 February 2025
15:30 WIB (UTC+7)

Bhayangkara Sriwijaya	2–2	Porsiba
	Report

Jakabaring Archery Field, Palembang

Matchday 5 (15 February 2025)
15 February 2025
13:30 WIB (UTC+7)

David	2–2	Bhayangkara Sriwijaya
	Report

Jakabaring Archery Field, Palembang
15 February 2025
15:30 WIB (UTC+7)

FISIP UNSRI United	0–4	Porsiba
	Report

Jakabaring Archery Field, Palembang

== Second round ==
The top six teams from the first round will by play in second round which will be played in a home tournament format of single round-robin matches. The top two teams will qualify for the finals and national phase.

All matches will be held at Jakabaring Archery Field and Jakabaring Baseball Field, Palembang.

Pos	Team	Pld	W	D	L	GF	GA	GD	Pts	Qualification	PAL	KMP	PBA	MBA	DFC	BHA
1	PS Palembang	5	4	1	0	13	2	+11	13	Qualification to the Finals & National phase	—	0–0	—	2–1	—	9–1
2	KMP Bumara	5	2	3	0	8	2	+6	9 (Note: Ranked on head-to-head points: KMP Bumara 3, Porsiba 0.)	Qualification to the Finals & National phase	—	—	2–1	—	0–0	5–0
3	Porsiba	5	3	0	2	10	5	+5	9		0–1	—	—	—	3–1	—
4	Persimuba	5	2	1	2	9	9	0	7		—	1–1	1–3	—	—	2–1
5	David	5	1	1	3	8	10	−2	4		0–1	—	—	2–4	—	—
6	Bhayangkara Sriwijaya	5	0	0	5	4	24	−20	0		—	—	0–3	—	2–5	—

Source: Liga 4 South Sumatra
Rules for classification: 1) Points; 2) Head-to-head points; 3) Head-to-head goal difference; 4) Head-to-head goals scored; 5) Goal difference; 6) Goals scored; 7) Fair-play points; 8) Draw.

=== Matches ===
Matchday 1 (17 February 2025)
17 February 2025
08:00 WIB (UTC+7)

KMP Bumara	0–0	David
	Report

Jakabaring Archery Field, Palembang
17 February 2025
13:30 WIB (UTC+7)

PS Palembang	2–1	Persimuba
	Report

Jakabaring Archery Field, Palembang
17 February 2025
15:30 WIB (UTC+7)

Bhayangkara Sriwijaya	0–3	Porsiba
	Report

Jakabaring Archery Field, Palembang

Matchday 2 (18 February 2025)
18 February 2025
08:00 WIB (UTC+7)

PS Palembang	0–0	KMP Bumara
	Report

Jakabaring Baseball Field, Palembang
18 February 2025
13:30 WIB (UTC+7)

Porsiba	3–1	David
	Report

Jakabaring Baseball Field, Palembang
18 February 2025
15:30 WIB (UTC+7)

Persimuba	2–1	Bhayangkara Sriwijaya
	Report

Jakabaring Baseball Field, Palembang

Matchday 3 (20 February 2025)
20 February 2025
08:00 WIB (UTC+7)

Persimuba	1–3	Porsiba
	Report

Jakabaring Archery Field, Palembang
20 February 2025
13:30 WIB (UTC+7)

KMP Bumara	5–0	Bhayangkara Sriwijaya
	Report

Jakabaring Archery Field, Palembang
20 February 2025
15:30 WIB (UTC+7)

David	0–1	PS Palembang
	Report

Jakabaring Archery Field, Palembang

Matchday 4 (21 February 2025)
21 February 2025
08:00 WIB (UTC+7)

Persimuba	1–1	KMP Bumara
	Report

Jakabaring Baseball Field, Palembang
21 February 2025
13:30 WIB (UTC+7)

Bhayangkara Sriwijaya	2–5	David
	Report

Jakabaring Baseball Field, Palembang
21 February 2025
15:30 WIB (UTC+7)

Porsiba	0–1	PS Palembang
	Report

Jakabaring Baseball Field, Palembang

Matchday 5 (23 February 2025)
23 February 2025
08:00 WIB (UTC+7)

PS Palembang	9–1	Bhayangkara Sriwijaya
	Report

Jakabaring Baseball Field, Palembang
23 February 2025
15:00 WIB (UTC+7)

David	2–4	Persimuba
	Report

Jakabaring Archery Field, Palembang
23 February 2025
15:00 WIB (UTC+7)

KMP Bumara	2–1	Porsiba
	Report

Jakabaring Baseball Field, Palembang

== Finals ==
The finals will be played over two legs. If the aggregate score is level, the winners are decided by a penalty shoot-out.

=== Summary ===
The first legs will be played on 25 February, and the second legs will be played on 26 February 2025.

Team 1	Agg.	Team 2	1st leg	2nd leg
PS Palembang	3–1	KMP Bumara	1–1	2–1

=== Matches ===
25 February 2025
14:30 WIB (UTC+7)

PS Palembang	1–1	KMP Bumara
	Report

Jakabaring Baseball Field, Palembang

26 February 2025
14:30 WIB (UTC+7)

KMP Bumara	1–2	PS Palembang
	Report

Bumi Sriwijaya Stadium, Palembang

PS Palembang won 3–1 on aggregate.

== See also ==
- 2024–25 Liga 4
