= Sekayu =

Sekayu may refer to:

== Places ==
- Sekayu, Indonesia, a town and the capital of Musi Banyuasin Regency in South Sumatra, Indonesia.
- Sekayu, Malaysia, a small village in Terengganu, Malaysia.

== Language ==
- Sekayu language, also known as Musi language, a Malayan dialect in South Sumatra.
