= 2021 Liga 3 South Sumatra =

Tournament details
- Dates: 8–21 December 2021
- Teams: 15

Final positions
- Champions: PS Palembang (2nd title)
- Runners-up: Persimuba Musi Banyuasin

The 2021 Liga 3 South Sumatra was the third season of Liga 3 South Sumatra as a qualifying round for the national round of the 2021–22 Liga 3.

Muba United were the defending champion.

== Teams ==
There are 8 teams participated in the league this season.

Team	Location
Bhayangkara Sriwijaya	Palembang
Palembang Sportivo	Palembang
Persimuba Musi Banyuasin	Musi Banyuasin
Persimura Musi Rawas	Musi Rawas
Persipra Prabumulih	Prabumulih
PS Banyuasin	Banyuasin
PS Palembang	Palembang
PSSL Bayung Lencir	Musi Banyuasin

== First round ==
=== Group A ===
Pos	Team	Pld	W	D	L	GF	GA	GD	Pts	Qualification
1	Persimuba Musi Banyuasin	3	2	1	0	12	4	+8	7	Advanced to the next round
2	Persipra Prabumulih (H)	3	1	2	0	5	1	+4	5	Advanced to the next round
3	PS Banyuasin	3	1	1	1	12	2	+10	4	
4	PSSL Bayung Lencir	3	0	0	3	2	24	−22	0	

Updated to match(es) played on 12 December 2021. Source: Liga 3 2021 Sumatra Selatan
(H) Hosts

=== Group B ===
Pos	Team	Pld	W	D	L	GF	GA	GD	Pts	Qualification
1	PS Palembang	3	2	1	0	7	0	+7	7	Advanced to the next round
2	Persimura Musi Rawas	3	2	0	1	4	6	−2	6	Advanced to the next round
3	Bhayangkara Sriwijaya	3	1	1	1	4	2	+2	4	
4	Palembang Sportivo	3	0	0	3	1	8	−7	0	

Updated to match(es) played on 12 December 2021. Source: Liga 3 2021 Sumatra Selatan

== Second round ==
Pos	Team	Pld	W	D	L	GF	GA	GD	Pts	Qualification
1	PS Palembang	3	2	0	1	7	4	+3	6	Finals
2	Persimuba Musi Banyuasin	3	1	2	0	4	3	+1	5	Finals
3	Persipra Prabumulih (H)	3	1	1	1	2	2	0	4	
4	Persimura Musi Rawas	3	0	1	2	2	6	−4	1	

Updated to match(es) played on 17 December 2021. Source: Liga 3 2021 Sumatra Selatan
(H) Hosts

== Finals ==
=== First leg ===
December 19, 2021
15.00 UTC+7

PS Palembang	1–0	Persimuba Musi Banyuasin
Wahyudi Ucok (pen.)	Report

Talang Jimar Stadium, Prabumulih

=== Second leg ===
December 21, 2021
15.00 UTC+7

Persimuba Musi Banyuasin	0-1	PS Palembang
		Wahyudi Ucok

Talang Jimar Stadium, Prabumulih
