= Serasan Sekate Stadium =

Multipurpose stadium in Musi Banyuasin, Indonesia

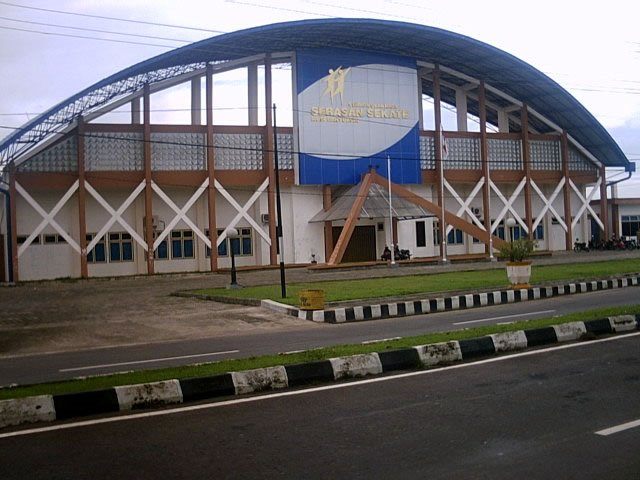
- Front view

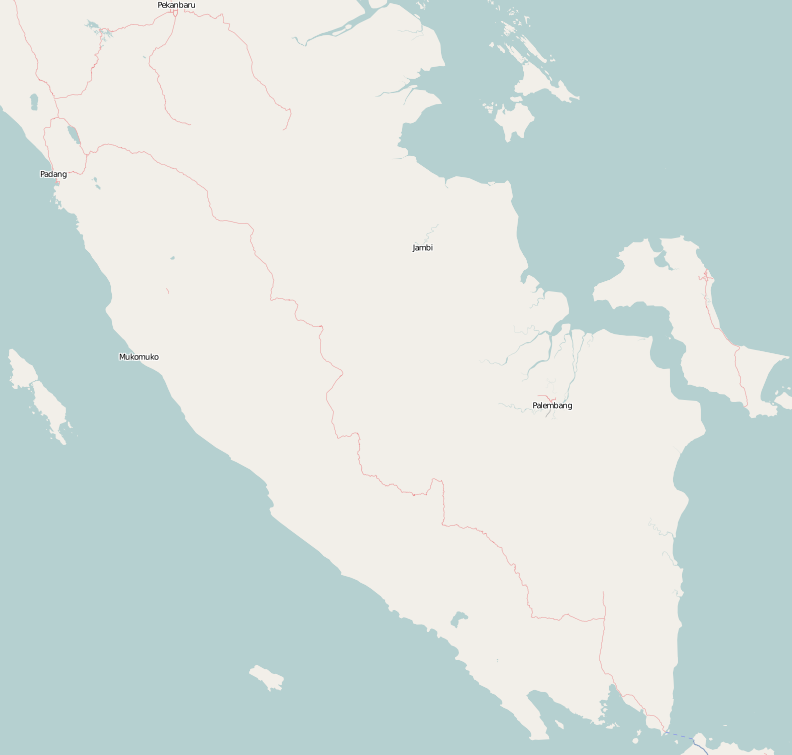
- Location in Southern Sumatra
- Location: Sekayu, Musi Banyuasin Regency, South Sumatra, Indonesia
- Coordinates: 2.885196°S 103.838606°E
- Owner: Government of Musi Banyuasin Regency
- Operator: Government of Musi Banyuasin Regency
- Capacity: 5,000
- Surface: Grass field

Tenant
- Persimuba Musi Banyuasin

Serasan Sekate Stadium is a multipurpose stadium in Musi Banyuasin, South Sumatra, Indonesia. It is currently used mostly for football matches. It is the home of Persimuba Musi Banyuasin.
