= Ahmad Syarifuddin Natabaya =

Constitutional Court judge
- In office 16 August 2003 – 16 August 2008
- President: Megawati Sukarnoputri

Personal details
- Born: 3 March 1942 Cempaka, East Ogan Komering Ulu Regency, South Sumatra, Indonesia
- Died: July 10, 2019 (aged 77)
- Citizenship: Indonesian

Ahmad Natabaya, also known as HAS Natabaya, is a former judge of the Constitutional Court of Indonesia. He completed his Bachelor of Law degree at Sriwijaya University in Palembang in 1967, his master's degree at Indiana University Robert H. McKinney School of Law in 1981, and then returned to Sriwijaya where he taught as a professor of law. He has two children.

Natabaya remained active in judicial affairs even after his retirement, appearing at the Constitutional Court to represent a case arguing that corporations are subject to income tax under the Constitution of Indonesia but were not paying said tax.
