= Sriwijaya University =

University in South Sumatra, Indonesia

- Universitas Sriwijaya
- Motto: Ilmu Alat Pengabdian
- Motto in English: Education as tool for Dedication
- Type: Public
- Established: October 29, 1960
- Affiliations: ASAIHL, Institute of International Education, AUAP
- Rector: Ir. Taufiq Marwa, S.E., M.Si.
- Location: Palembang and Indralaya, South Sumatra, Indonesia; 2.986444°S 104.734333°E
- Campus: Urban
- Colors: Yellow
- Nickname: Unsri
- Website: unsri.ac.id
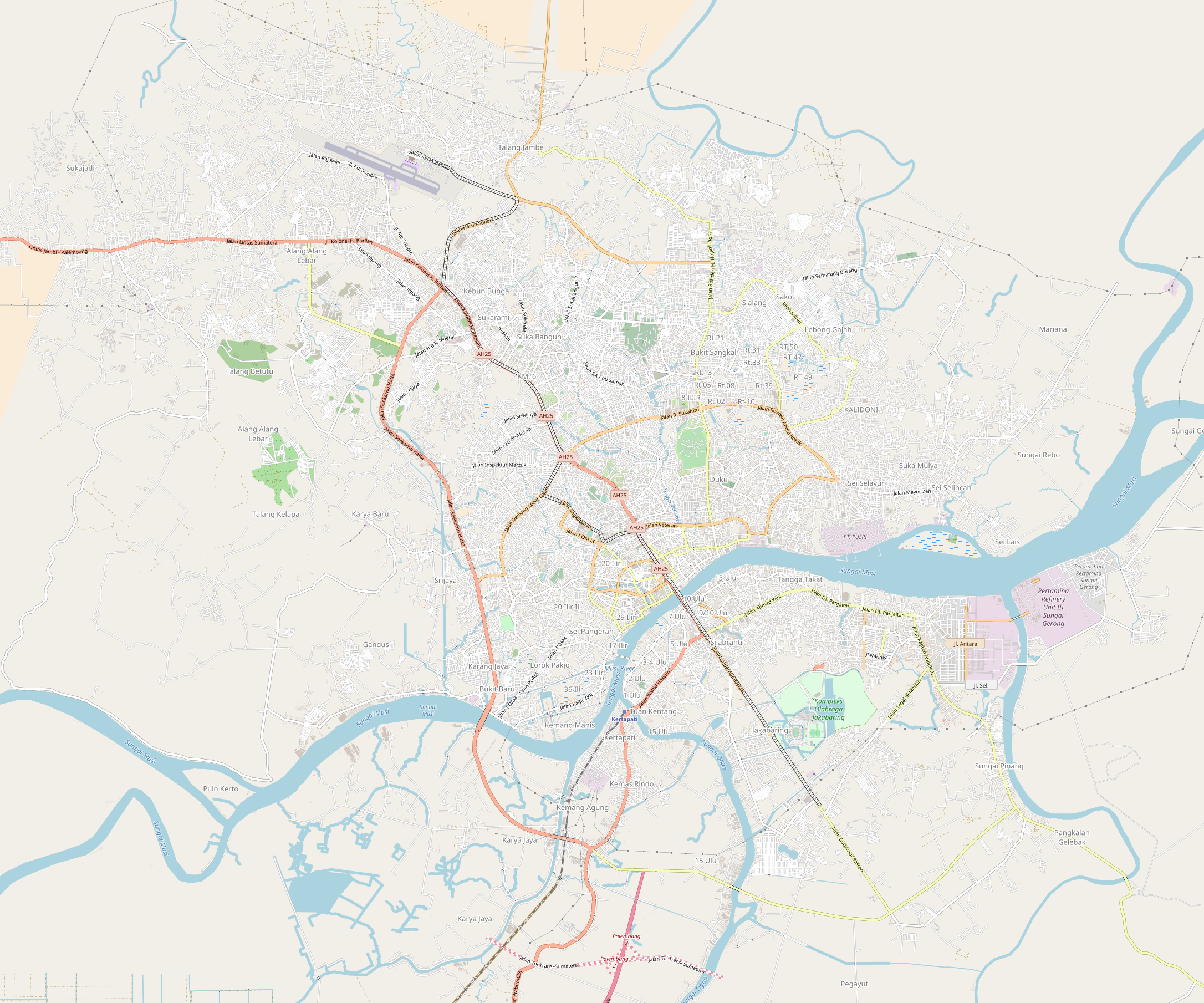
- Location in Palembang

Sriwijaya University (Indonesian: Universitas Sriwijaya; abbreviated as UNSRI) is an Indonesian university located in Palembang, South Sumatra.

UNSRI obtained the accreditation "Very Good (A)" awarded by the National Accreditation Board of Higher Education (Badan Akrediasi Nasional Perguruan Tinggi, abbreviated as BAN-PT). According to the 2024 Times Higher Education (THE) World University Rankings, UNSRI holds a position of 1501+. Additionally, it secures the 751-800 position in the QS Asian University Rankings. In the Times Higher Education (THE) World University Rankings by subject, UNSRI is placed in the 1001+ category for both Engineering & Technology and Physical Sciences.

== History ==
The idea to establish a college in South Sumatra had been around since the early 1950s and was prompted on Independence Day celebration on August 17, 1952. Initiated by some community leaders, the idea was transformed into an agreement to form a Panitia Fakultet Sumatera Selatan (South Sumatera’s Faculty Committee). At the end of August 1952, the faculty of economics was established under some considerations. Thus, South Sumatera’s Faculty Committee for Economics was set up and then managed by a foundation established on 1 April 1953. It was named Yayasan Perguruan Tinggi Syakhyakirti (Syakhyakirti Higher Education Foundation).

This Faculty was officially opened on October 31, 1953 in a ceremony attended by Mr. Hadi, Secretary General of the Ministry of Education Teaching and Culture (KDP), Drg. M. Isa (Governor of South Sumatera), Bambang Utoyo (Commander of the Sriwijaya II TT), and Ali Gathmyr (Chairman of the Parliament of South Sumatera).

The Foundation of Higher Education Syakhyakirti continued the efforts to establish the university by organizing Panitia Penyelenggaraan Fakultas Hukum (Law Faculty Committee). It was inaugurated as ‘Faculty of Law and Public Knowledge’ on November 1, 1957, coinciding with the celebration of Dies Natalis IV of Economics Faculty.

The progress was sustained by the help of Military Authorities Territorial II Sriwijaya that provided financial assistance to construct a permanent building of Syakhyakirti Higher Education Foundation in Bukit Besar (now Bukit Besar’s Campus of Sriwijaya University). The cornerstone laying ceremony took place on October 31, 1957.

The next effort was state validation of the existing college. With the persistent efforts of community leaders of South Sumatera, like Colonel Harun Sohar (A Commander as well as Chairman of Paperda TT II/Sriwijaya) and A. Bastari (Governor), the obstacles of building the university could be overcome. Then, in December 1959, a delegation was sent to Jakarta to meet the Minister of KDP (Mr. Moh. Yamin) where they managed to obtain the Government willingness guarantee for taking over Syakhyakirti college to become a state university. Under the Government Regulation no. 42 of 1960 dated October 29, 1960 (State Archive year 1960 no.135) Sriwijaya University was officially inaugurated on the 3rd of November 1960 and President Sukarno ceremonially signing the charter witnessed by Minister of KDP (Mr. Priyono) and several Ambassadors of the fellow countries. Drg. M Isa was appointed with Presidential Decree No. 696/M of 1960 dated 29 October 1960 as the first President of the University.

To meet the development demands, Sriwijaya University planned to expand the campus area by opening an area of 712 hectares in Indralaya, Ogan Komering Ilir (Now Ogan Ilir- OI), in 1982. The development of this new campus building started in 1983. The development of the campus started in 1989 and ended in 1993.

The South Sumatera’s Governor at that time, Ramli Hasan Basri H, gave his inaugural lecture on Indralaya campus on September 1, 1993. The utilization of the facilities of Sriwijaya University in Indralaya was fully implemented with the issuance of the Decree of the Rector in January 1995 which stipulated that started from February 1, 1995 all activities of administration and most of the academic activities of Sriwijaya University were held on Indralaya campus. The Inauguration of Sriwijaya University’s new campus in Indralaya was officially held on March 6, 1997 by President Suharto.

== Location and facilities ==
The campuses are located in Indralaya, Ogan Ilir Regency and Palembang.

- Indralaya Main Campus: Jl. Raya Palembang-Prabumulih Km. 32, Indralaya, Ogan Ilir 30662, South Sumatera, Indonesia.
- Palembang Campuses:
  - Bukit Besar Campus: Jl. Srijaya Negara, Bukit Besar, Palembang, South Sumatera, Indonesia 30139
  - Graduate School Campus: Jl. Padang Selasa No.524, Bukit Besar, Palembang, South Sumatera, Indonesia 30139
  - Ogan Campus (Faculty of Teacher Training and Education): Jl. Ogan, Bukit Besar, Palembang, South Sumatera, Indonesia 30139
  - Faculty of Agriculture Palembang Campus: Lorong Hibah I, Bukit Besar, Palembang, South Sumatera, Indonesia 30139
  - KM 5 Campus (Faculty of Teacher Training and Education): Jl. Srijaya No. 628, Srijaya, Palembang, South Sumatera, Indonesia 30138
  - Madang Campus (Faculty of Medicine): Jl. Dr. Mohd. Ali, Komplek RSMH Palembang, South Sumatera, Indonesia 30126

The Indralaya Main Campus with an area of 712 hectares is located about 35 kilometers southwest of Palembang. It is the center for bachelor (S1) programs of Unsri. Bukit Besar Campus with an area of 32.5 hectares, used as an educational facility for vocational (D3), master (S2), doctoral (S3), and some of the bachelor programs.

On the Indralaya Campus there are facilities such as Central Library, Institute of Languages, Institute of Research, Institute of Community Services, Computer Center, Student Activity Center, Community Health Center, Health Clinic, and University Fire Station. Unsri also owns a 50 hectares farm for experiments in Gelumbang, Muara Enim Regency (62 kilometers southwest of Palembang).

For inter-campus transportation, Unsri provides self-owned buses between the Bukit Besar Campus and Indralaya Main campus for students and staffs. In addition, Perum DAMRI also provides a direct trajectory between the aforementioned campuses. For internal transportation within the Indralaya Campus, Unsri offers free shuttle buses. PT. KAI also offers trains that runs between Kertapati Station in Palembang and Indralaya Station.

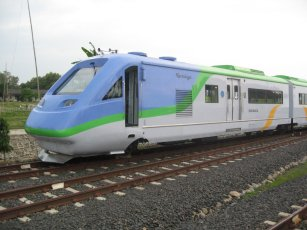
Unsri Student Train

Student facilities:

1. Libraries
2. Sport Venues
3. ICT Services
4. Dormitories and Boarding
5. Student Center
6. Health Clinic
7. Camping Ground

== Faculties ==
The university has 10 faculties in the Vocational and Bachelor Program:

- Faculty of Economics
  - Economic Development
  - Management
  - Accountancy (S1 and D3)
  - Secretariat (D3)
- Faculty of Law
  - Law
    - Criminal Law
    - Civil Law
    - Administrative Law
    - Constitutional Law
    - International Law
- Faculty of Engineering
  - Civil Engineering
  - Mining Engineering
  - Chemical Engineering
  - Electrical Engineering
  - Mechanical Engineering
  - Architectural Engineering
  - Geological Engineering
- Faculty of Medicine
  - Medical Doctor Education
  - Nursery
  - Dentistry
  - Psychology
- Faculty of Agriculture
  - Agronomy
  - Agroecotechnology
  - Agribusiness
  - Soil Science
  - Agriculture Engineering
  - Agricultural Technology
  - Plant Protection
  - Husbandry
  - Aquaculture
  - Fishery Technology
- Faculty of Teacher Training and Education
  - English Education
  - Bahasa Indonesia Education
  - Economics Education
  - History Education
  - Civic Education
  - Physical Education
  - Guidance and Counseling
  - Mathematics Education
  - Biology Education
  - Chemistry Education
  - Physics Education
  - Mechanical Engineering Education
  - Elementary School Teaching Education
  - Preschool Teaching Education
  - Non-Formal Teaching Education
  - Teacher Professional Education
- Faculty of Social Science and Political Science
  - Public Administration
  - Sociology
  - Communication
  - International Relations
- Faculty of Mathematics and Natural Science
  - Mathematics
  - Physics
  - Chemistry
  - Biology
  - Marine Science
  - Pharmacy
- Faculty of Computer Science
  - Informatics System
  - Computer System
  - Informatics Engineering
- Faculty of Public Health
  - Public Health
  - Nutritional Science
  - Environmental Health

Unsri also offers programs in Medical Specialties:

- Dermatology, Venereology, and Aesthetic
- Child Health
- General Surgery
- Thoracic, Cardiac, and Vascular Surgery
- Optical Diseases
- Internal Diseases
  - Medical Oncology Hematology Subspecialties
  - Allergies Subspecialties
  - Cardiovascular Subspecialties
  - Rheumatology Subspecialties
  - Pulmonology Subspecialties
  - Metabolic Endocrinology and Diabetes Subspecialties
  - Kidney and Hypertension Subspecialties
  - Gastroenterohepatology Subspecialties
- Obstetrics and Gynecology
- Anatomical Pathology
- Ears, Nose, Throat, and Head-Throat Surgery
- Anesthesiology and Intensive Therapy
- Neurology
- Orthopaedy and Traumatology
