= Martapura =

Martapura may refer to:

- Martapura, South Kalimantan
- Martapura, South Sumatra, the capital of East Ogan Komering Ulu Regency
- Martapura River, southeast Borneo, Indonesia
- Martapura F.C., an Indonesian football club
