= Persimuba Musi Banyuasin =

Indonesian football club in South Sumatra

- Full name: Persatuan Sepakbola Indonesia Musi Banyuasin
- Nickname: Laskar Mati Dem Asal Top
- Short name: Persimuba
- Founded: 1996; 30 years ago
- Ground: Serasan Sekate Stadium
- Capacity: 5,000
- Owner: PSSI Musi Banyuasin
- President: Akhmad Toyibir
- Manager: Yudi Suhendra
- Coach: Sunarnan
- League: Liga 4
- 2024–25: 4th, (South Sumatra zone)
Home colours	Away colours

Persatuan Sepak Bola Indonesia Musi Banyuasin, commonly referred to as Persimuba Musi Banyuasin, or simply Persimuba, is an Indonesian football club based in Musi Banyuasin, Indonesia. This club is known as Laskar Mati Dem Asal Top. The club currently plays in Liga 4.

== Honours ==
- Liga 3 South Sumatra
  - Champions (1): 2022
  - Runner-up (1): 2021
