= Indonesia Education League =

- Founded: 2009
- Country: Indonesia
- Number of clubs: Junior and senior high schools and universities as equivalent Indonesia
- Current champions: SMP Negeri 13 Yogyakarta; SMA Darussalam; Universitas Budi Luhur (2009–10)
- Most championships: SMP Negeri 13 Yogyakarta (1); SMA Darussalam (1); Universitas Budi Luhur (1)
- Website: www.ligapendidikan.com
- Current: 2010–11

Indonesia Education League (in Indonesian : Liga Pendidikan Indonesia) is a football competition between junior and senior high schools and universities all over Indonesia. It is organized in stages, from the regency / city, provincial, regional, and national levels. Implementation of activities outside school hours or on school holidays on major educational element. Organized by the principle of the sports industry. Cooperation of the Ministry of National Education and Ministry of Youth and Sports and the Football Association of Indonesia. The President Cup tournament is gaining.

== Players rules ==
Is a registered student or students who are actively studying in high school / University and has an average rating of academic seven for students in high school and college students who have a cumulative IP of 2.5. For players from junior high and equivalent levels should be a maximum of 15 years old, for players from high school and should equal a maximum of 18 years old and for players from the university should be a maximum of 23 years old. Players who are registered, are required to have a Community Card Indonesia Education League.

== Championship history ==
Year	Champions			Runners-up		
Year	University	Senior high school	Junior high school	University	Senior high school	Junior high school
2009-10	Universitas Budi Luhur	SMA Darussalam	SMP Negeri 13 Yogyakarta	Universitas Negeri Yogyakarta	SMA Negeri 1 Bangkalan	SMPN 8 Sekayu
2010-11	Universitas Cenderawasih, Papua		SMPN 3 Gresik			SMPN 4 Semarang

== Awards ==
=== Top scorers ===
Year	University		Senior high school		Junior high school	
Year	Player	School	Player	School	Player	School
2009-10	Syaiful Hidayat	Universitas Negeri Padang	Hadi Wibowo	SMA Negeri 1 Bangkalan	Mega Nanda	SMPN 8 Sekayu
2010-11					M. Dimas Drajat	SMPN 3 Gresik

=== Fair Play Awards ===
Year	School category recipient		
Year	University	Senior high school	Junior high school
2009-10	STAIN Palopo, Palopo	SMA Darussalam, South Tangerang	SMP Negeri 8 Sekayu, Musi Banyuasin Regency
2010-11			SMP Negeri 4, Semarang
