= PersiOKUT East Ogan Komering Ulu =

Indonesian football club

PersiOKUT
- Full name: Persatuan Sepakbola Indonesia Ogan Komering Ulu (OKU) Timur
- Nickname: Laskar Bakas Bani
- Founded: 8 January 2025; 14 months ago
- Ground: Tebat Sari Stadium; Martapura, South Sumatra
- Capacity: 2,000
- Owner: East Ogan Komering Ulu Regency government
- President: Kol. Inf. (Purn) Ruslan
- Coach: Joko Nugroho
- League: Liga 4
- 2024–25: 4th, in Group A (South Sumatra zone)
| Home colours | Away colours |

Persatuan Sepakbola Indonesia Ogan Komering Ulu (OKU) Timur, or PersiOKUT, is an Indonesian football club based in East Ogan Komering Ulu Regency, South Sumatra. They currently compete in Liga 4 South Sumatra zone. Their homebase is Tebat Sari Stadium.

For 2024–25 season, PersiOKUT will collaborate with PS Tria under the name PersiOKUT Tria while waiting for PSSI South Sumatra membership approval at the Ordinary Congress next April.
