= Indralaya =

- District
- Location in Sumatra and Indonesia Indralaya (Indonesia)
- Coordinates: 3°15′5″S 104°39′16″E
- Country: Indonesia
- Province: South Sumatra
- Regency: Ogan Ilir

Government
  - Head of District: Rahmini

Area
  - Total: 101.22 km^{2} (39.08 sq mi)

Population (mid 2024 estimate)
  - Total: 44,118
  - Density: 435.86/km^{2} (1,128.9/sq mi)
- Time zone: UTC7 (Indonesia Western Time)
- Area code: (+62) 711
- Website: indralaya.oganilirkab.go.id

Indralaya is a town and also an administrative district (kecamatan). The town serves as the capital of Ogan Ilir Regency in South Sumatra Province of Indonesia. This town is a satellite community of Palembang city at a distance of 31 km. Indralaya is also part of the Palembang metropolitan area, which was designed by the central government to create the 10 New Jakarta areas. This is also in line with the construction of the inner city Palembang–Indralaya (Palindra) Toll Road, which shortens the distance between Palembang and Indralaya, especially for easy access for Sriwijaya University students.

The area of Indralaya District is 101.22 km^{2} which is divided into 17 rural villages (desa) and 3 urban villages (kelurahan); the latter - Indralaya Indah, Indralaya Mulya and Indralaya Raya - form the town and together cover 11.65 km^{2} and had a combined population of 15,238 as at mid 2024. The villages with the largest area in the district are Sejaro Sakti desa with an area of 19.57 km^{2} and Tanjung Seteko desa with an area of 13.44 km^{2}, while the village with the smallest area is Muara Penimbung Ulu desa with an area of 0.84 km^{2}. Indralaya District contains 74 hamlets and 144 neighborhood associations (RT).

The city is also crossed by the Trans-Sumatra Highway and the Trans-Sumatra Toll Road, the Palembang-Indralaya section and the Indralaya-Prabumulih Intersection section.
