= Penukal Abab Lematang Ilir Regency =

Regency in South Sumatra, Indonesia

Penukal Abab Lematang Ilir Regency Kabupaten Penukal Abab Lematang Ilir PALI Regency
- Regency
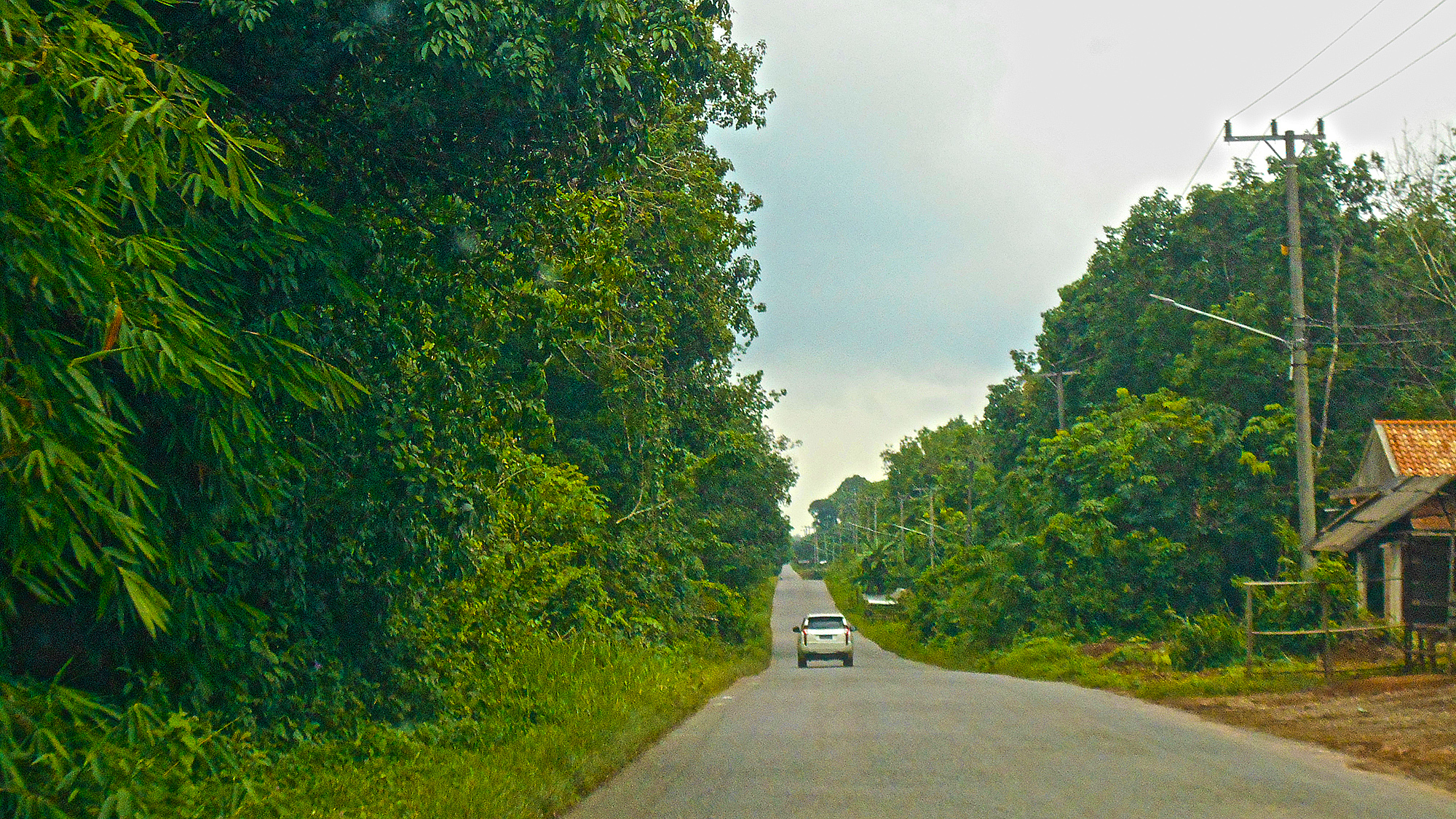
- Sekayu-Belimbing road in PALI

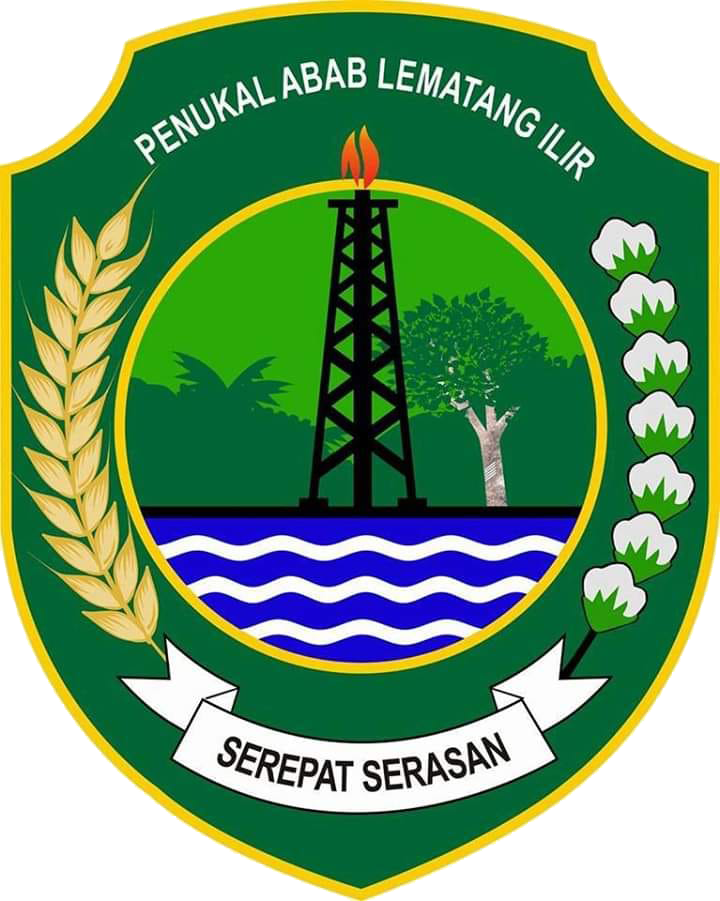
- Coat of arms
- Nickname: PALI
- Motto: Serepat Serasan
- Location within South Sumatra

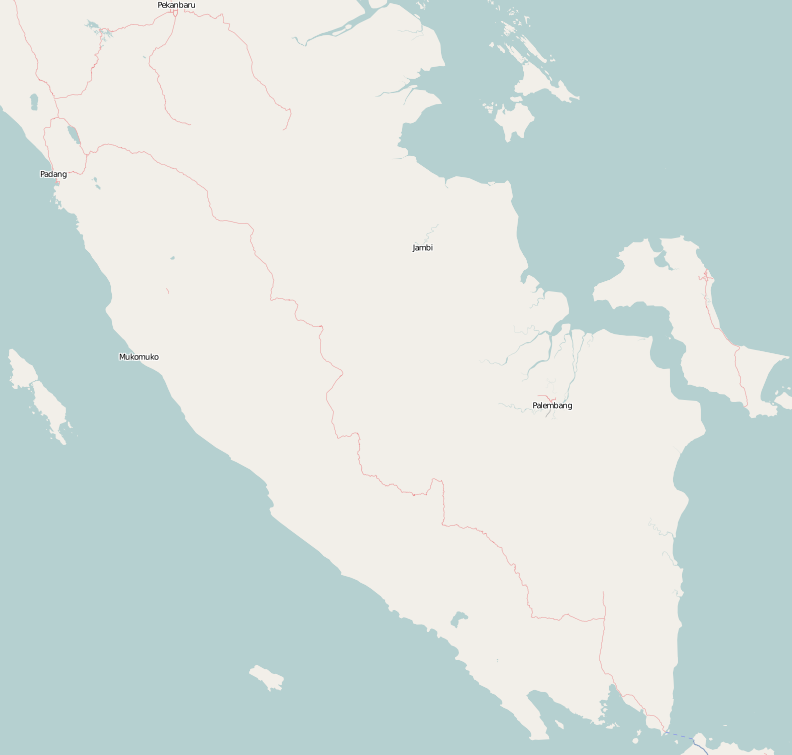
- Location in Southern Sumatra, Sumatra and Indonesia Penukal Abab Lematang Ilir Regency (Sumatra) Penukal Abab Lematang Ilir Regency (Indonesia)
- Coordinates: 3.2134°S 104.0872°E
- Country: Indonesia
- Province: South Sumatra
- Established: 11 January 2013; 13 years ago
- Founded by: Government of Indonesia
- Regency seat: Talang Ubi

Government
  - Type: Regency Government
  - Regent: Asgianto
  - Vice Regent: Iwan Tuaji

Area
  - Total: 1,840 km^{2} (710 sq mi)

Population (mid 2025 estimate)
  - Total: 217,497
  - Density: 118/km^{2} (306/sq mi)
  - Ethnicity: Malay Javanese
- Time zone: UTC+7 (Indonesia Western Standard Time)
- Postcode: 312xx
- Area code: (+62) 713
- Website: palikab.go.id

Penukal Abab Lematang Ilir Regency (often abbreviated to PALI Regency) is a regency of South Sumatra Province, Indonesia. It takes its name from the three main rivers which flow through that area - the Penukal River, Abab River and Lematang River - while the name Ilir means "downstream" (denoting the downstream part of the Lematang River). The town of Talang Ubi is the administrative centre of this regency. The regency borders Musi Banyuasin Regency to the north, Banyuasin Regency, and Muara Enim Regency to the east and the south, and by Musi Rawas Regency, and Muara Enim Regency to the west.

The regency was established on 14 December 2012, comprising five districts which were formerly part of Muara Enim Regency. These five districts had a combined area of 1,840.00 km^{2} and a population of 165,474 at the 2010 Census and 194,900 at the 2020 Census; the official estimate as at mid 2025 was 217,497 (comprising 110,336 males and 107,161 females).

== Administrative districts ==
Penukal Abab Lematang Ilir Regency is composed of the following five districts (kecamatan), listed below with their areas and populations at the 2010 Census and 2020 Census, together with the official estimates as at mid 2025. The table also includes the locations of the district administrative centres, the number of administrative villages in each district (totaling 65 rural desa and 6 urban kelurahan, the latter all in Talang Ubi District), and their postal codes.

Kode Wilayah	Name of District (kecamatan)	Area in km^{2}	Pop'n Census 2010	Pop'n Census 2020	Pop'n Estimate mid 2025	Admin centre	No. of villages	Post code
16.12.01	Talang Ubi (a)	648.40	67,258	83,669	95,644	Handayani Mulia	20 ^{(b)}	31214 ^{(c)}
16.12.05	Tanah Abang	156.60	27,237	30,576	34,429	Tanah Abang Selatan	17	31314
16.12.04	Abab	416.00	23,207	27,058	29,460	Prabumenang	8	31315
16.12.03	Penukal	272.00	26,978	30,178	32,508	Babat	13	31316
16.12.02	Penukal Utara (North Penukal)	347.00	20,794	23,419	25,456	Betung	13	31317
	Totals	1,840.00	154,474	194,900	217,497	Talang Ubi	71	

Notes: (a) the four kelurahan forming Talang Ubi town (Talang Ubi Barat, Talang Ubi Selatan, Talang Ubi Timur and Talang Ubi Utara) together had a population of 36,693 at the mid-2024 official estimates. The other two kelurahan are Handayani Mulya (8,767 in 2024) and Pasar Bhayangkara (6,270), situated immediately to the southeast and southwest respectively of the town, to give a total kelurahan population of 51,730.
(b) of which 6 are urban kelurahan and 14 are rural desa.
(c) 17 villages within the district share the postcode of 31214 (including Talang Ubi Utara, Handayani Mulya and Pasar Bhayangkara); the others are Talang Ubi Barat (with postcode of 31211), Talang Ubi Selatan (with postcode of 31212) and Talang Ubi Timur (with postcode of 31213).

== See also ==
- List of long place names
