= PS Palembang =

Indonesian football club

- Full name: Persatuan Sepakbola Palembang
- Nicknames: Laskar Segentar Alam (Segentar Alam Warriors)
- Founded: 1921; 105 years ago as Palembangsche Voetbal Bond (PVB)
- Ground: Bumi Sriwijaya Stadium, Palembang
- Capacity: 15,000
- Owner: Palembang Government
- Chairman: Ratu Dewa
- Head coach: Jarot
- League: Liga 4
- 2024–25: 1st, (South Sumatra zone); First round, 3rd in Group G (National phase)
Home colours	Away colours

Persatuan Sepakbola Palembang (English: Football Association of Palembang) is an Indonesian professional football club based in Palembang, South Sumatra. The club is also known as "Segentar Alam Warriors" and is owned by the Government of Palembang.

== Logo ==
The circular logo suggests the unity of all communities in the city of Palembang.

== Stadium ==
Gelora Sriwijaya Stadium is the current home of the PS Palembang and Sriwijaya FC.

== Players (2021) ==
As of 31 August 2021

Note: Flags indicate national team as defined under FIFA eligibility rules; some limited exceptions apply. Players may hold more than one non-FIFA nationality.

No.	Pos.	Nation	Player
—	GK	IDN	Malvino Rezeky Mahendra
—	GK	IDN	Dimas Adiswara
—	GK	IDN	Yogi Pratama
—	DF	IDN	Yoel Louis Lidun Ruing
—	DF	IDN	Bayu Dwi Saputra
—	DF	IDN	Andra Firdaus
—	DF	IDN	Wahyu Saputra
—	DF	IDN	M. Akmal Prambudyo
—	DF	IDN	M. Miftakhul Huda
—	DF	IDN	Aidil Saputra
—	DF	IDN	Muhammad Zaid
—	DF	IDN	Rama Ardana
—	DF	IDN	Ade Andrean
—	DF	IDN	M. Wafilah Akbar
—	MF	IDN	Rizky
—	MF	IDN	Fiky Hamzah Madyan
—	MF	IDN	Rengga Alvaro

No.	Pos.	Nation	Player
—	MF	IDN	Novrico
—	MF	IDN	Dicky Prastyo
—	MF	IDN	M. Ghulam Abdullog
—	MF	IDN	Kms Muhammad Ridho
—	MF	IDN	Alamanda
—	MF	IDN	Muhammad Abdam Alfariz
—	FW	IDN	Mgs Moh Zakaria
—	FW	IDN	M Gymnastiar
—	FW	IDN	Ferry Maulana
—	FW	IDN	Andik
—	FW	IDN	Julian Armando
—	FW	IDN	Malik Irzan Alhadad
—	FW	IDN	Rizky Armando
—	FW	IDN	M Ridho Kalkausar
—	FW	IDN	Muhammad Adam Jm
—	FW	IDN	Muhammad Yani
—	FW	IDN	Rizky Juliansyah

== Coaching staff (2021) ==
Position	Staff
Manager	(Indonesia) Kemas Haikal
Head coach	(Indonesia) Jarot
Assistant coach	(Indonesia) Septariyanto
Assistant coach	(Indonesia) Mahyadi Panggabean
Goalkepper coach	(Indonesia) Fauzan Baba

== Achievements & honours ==
- Liga Indonesia Second Division
  - Champions (1): 1999
- Liga 3 South Sumatra
  - Champions (1): 2021
- Liga 4 South Sumatra
  - Champions (1): 2024–25
