= Talung Kelapa =

Talung Kelapa is an administrative district (kecamatan) of Banyuasin Regency in South Sumatra, Indonesia. It is situated immediately to the north of the city of Palembang, and contains many of the northern suburbs of that city, as well as more rural areas further north. It covers a land area of 461.97 km^{2} and had a rapidly growing population of 123,192 at the 2010 Census and 150,976 at the 2020 Census. The official estimate as at 2025 was 164,410. The administrative centre of the district is in the town (kelurahan) of Sukajadi in the Palembang suburbs.

== Towns and villages ==
The district is sub-divided into 13 towns and urban villages (kelurahan) and 6 more rural villages (desa), all of which share the postal code of 30961. These are tabulated below with their areas and the official estimates of their populations as at 2025.

Kode Wilayah	Name	Area in km^{2}	Pop'n Estimate mid 2025
16.07.10.1002	Air Batu	6.41	10,074
16.07.10.1003	Sukamoro	10.00	16,173
16.07.10.1004	Sukajadi	7.82	18,113
16.07.10.2005	Pangkalan Benteng	33.25	6,480
16.07.10.2007	Gasing	106.17	6,966
16.07.10.1006	Kenten	5.68	14,964
16.07.10.2001	Sungai Rengit	55.44	8,545
16.07.10.2019	Talang Buluh	19.49	3,720
16.07.10.1022	Tanah Mas	10.09	12,376
16.07.10.2021	Kenten Laut	126.67	11,054

Kode Wilayah	Name	Area in km^{2}	Pop'n Estimate mid 2025
16.07.10.1023	Talang Keramat	22.14	4,465
16.07.10.2020	Sungai Rengit Murni	52.22	2,338
16.07.10.1027	Air Batu Jaya	^{(a)}	3,378
16.07.10.1026	Rawa Maju	^{(a)}	5,522
16.07.10.1024	Sukajadi Timur	^{(a)}	15,214
16.07.10.1028	Sei Sedapat	^{(a)}	3,894
16.07.10.1029	Azhar Permai	^{(a)}	5,589
16.07.10.1025	Tanah Mas Indah	^{(a)}	8,369
16.07.10.1030	Keramat Jaya	^{(a)}	4,907
16.07.10	Totals	455.39	162,135

Note: (a) The areas of these 7 newer desa are included in the figures for the older desa from which they have been cut out.
