= Persipra Prabumulih =

Association football team in Indonesia

- Full name: Persatuan Sepakbola Indonesia Prabumulih
- Nicknames: Tim Kota Nanas (The Team of Pineapple City); Laskar Seinggok Sepemunyian (Seinggok Sepemunyian Warriors)
- Founded: 2002; 24 years ago
- Ground: Talang Jimar Stadium; Prabumulih, South Sumatra
- Capacity: 500
- Owner: Prabumulih Government
- Chairman: Ridho Yahya
- Manager: Setyo Puji Hartono
- Coach: Edi Iswantoro
- League: Liga 4
- 2024–25: 6th, in Group A (South Sumatra zone)
| Home colours | Away colours |

Persatuan Sepakbola Indonesia Prabumulih (simply known as Persipra Prabumulih) is an Indonesian football club based in Prabumulih, South Sumatra. They currently compete in the Liga 4.

== Honours ==
- Liga 3 South Sumatra zone
  - Third-place : 2021
