= PS Banyuasin =

Indonesian football club

- Full name: Persatuan Sepakbola Banyuasin
- Nicknames: Rimau Bernyali (The Brave Tigers)
- Ground: Ir. Poerdjianto Stadium; Banyuasin, South Sumatra
- Capacity: 8,000
- Owner: Banyuasin Government
- Chairman: H. Askolani
- Manager: Budi Wahyu
- Coach: Hendro Sukoco
- League: Liga 4
- 2024–25: 5th, in Group A (South Sumatra zone)
Home colours	Away colours

'Persatuan Sepakbola Banyuasin (simply known as PS Banyuasin) is an Indonesian football club based in Banyuasin Regency, South Sumatra. They currently compete in Liga 4 South Sumatra zone.
