= Porsiba Bukit Asam F.C. =

Indonesian football club

Porsiba Bukit Asam
- Full name: Pembinaan Olah Raga dan Seni Bukit Asam Football Club
- Nickname: Laskar Batubara
- Short name: PBA
- Founded: 1981; 45 years ago
- Ground: Saringan Football Field
- Capacity: 700
- Owner: PT Bukit Asam
- Chairman: Neci Agus Pranteno
- Manager: Razaq
- Coach: Wijay
- League: Liga 4
- 2024–25: 3rd, (South Sumatra zone)
Home colours	Away colours	Third colours

Pembinaan Olah Raga dan Seni Bukit Asam Football Club, commonly known as Porsiba Bukit Asam, is an Indonesian football club based in Tanjung Enim, Muara Enim Regency, South Sumatra. They currently compete in Liga 4 South Sumatra zone. Their homebase is Saringan Football Field.

== Honours ==
- Liga 4 South Sumatra
  - Runner-up (1): 2025–26
  - Third-place (1): 2024–25
