= Keluang =

District in Musi Banyuasin Regency, Indonesia

Coordinates: 2.6080°S 103.9100°E

Keluang is a district in the Musi Banyuasin Regency, South Sumatra Province, Sumatra, Indonesia. As of the 2010 census, the population was estimated to be 28,342.
