= Talang Ubi =

- District
- Location in Sumatra and Indonesia Talang Ubi (Indonesia)
- Coordinates: 3.2929468°S 103.8467967°E
- Country: Indonesia
- Province: South Sumatra
- Regency: Penukal Abab Lematang Ilir

Government
  - Head of District: Hj. Emilya, S.Sos

Area
  - Total: 648.4 km^{2} (250.3 sq mi)

Population (mid 2024)
  - Total: 94,230
  - Density: 145.3/km^{2} (376.4/sq mi)
- Time zone: UTC7 (Indonesia Western Time)
- Area code: (+62) 713
- Villages: 20

Talang Ubi is a town and administrative district (kecamatan) in Penukal Abab Lematang Ilir Regency, of South Sumatra province of Indonesia and it is the seat (capital) of Penukal Abab Lematang Ilir Regency. The district covers an area of 648.40 km^{2}, and had a population of 94,230 according to the official estimates as at mid 2024, of which the six kelurahan (Talang Ubi Barat, Talang Ubi Selatan, Talang Ubi Timur, Talang Ubi Utara, Handayani Mulya and Pasar Bhayangkara) together had a population of 50,245 according to the official mid-year estimates for 2023.

This comprised Talang Ubi Barat with 9,078 inhabitants in mid 2023, Talang Ubi Selatan with 8,985, Talang Ubi Timur with 9,397, Talang Ubi Utara with 8,551, Handayani Mulya (the location of the district administration) with 8,025 and Pasar Bhayangkara with 6,209; Handayani Mulya and Pasar Byayangkara are situated to the southeast and southwest respectively of the urban area of Talang Ubi town, which had 36,011 inhabitants.

Talang Ubi is known as an oil and coal mining area. Talang Ubi District was formerly in the Talang Akar area, and there were several large companies engaged in mining, forestry and plantations. The mining there includes petroleum and coal.
