= Sekayu, Malaysia =

For the district in Indonesia see: Sekayu, Indonesia

Sekayu (Jawi: سكايو) is a small village in Terengganu, Malaysia.
