= KMP Bumara F.C. =

Indonesian football club

KMP Bumara
- Full name: Karya Mandiri Propertindo Bungsu Lima Bersaudara Football Club
- Nickname: Laskar Properti
- Founded: 2020; 6 years ago
- Ground: KMP Bumara Mini Field
- Owner(s): PT. Karya Mandiri Propertindo (KMP); PT. Bungsu Lima Bersaudara (Bumara)
- Chairman: Didi Yanto
- Coach: Ardi Hernando
- League: Liga 4
- 2024–25: 2nd (South Sumatra zone); First round, 3rd in Group K (National phase)
Home colours	Away colours

Karya Mandiri Propertindo Bungsu Lima Bersaudara Football Club, simply known as KMP Bumara, is an Indonesian football club based in Palembang, South Sumatra. They currently compete in Liga 4 South Sumatra zone. Their homebase is KMP Bumara Mini Field.

== Honours ==
- Liga 4 South Sumatra
  - Runner-up (1): 2024–25
