= Muaradua =

Coordinates: 4.513519°S 104.170799°E

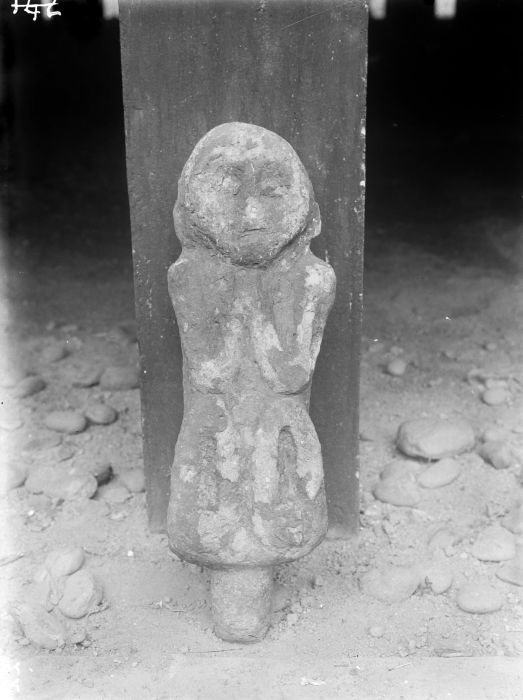
Megalithic statue in Muaradua (picture taken in 1931)

Muaradua, or usually spelled as Muara Dua, is a town and administrative district (kecamatan) in South Ogan Komering Ulu Regency, of South Sumatra province of Indonesia and it is the seat (capital) of South Ogan Komering Ulu Regency.

This town has a heavy rainfall and is nicknamed the "cool town". The district covers an area of 261.95 km^{2} and had a population of 50,076 at the 2020 Census, which rose to 50,628 according to the official estimates as at mid 2024. From Muaradua, it only takes 90 minutes to get to Lake Ranau, and it is located on the border of South Sumatra, Lampung and Bengkulu provinces. There are basically just two occupations in Muaradua, agriculture (75%) and civil servants (25%).
