= Palembang metropolitan area =

Palembang metropolitan area Patungraya Agung
- Metropolitan area
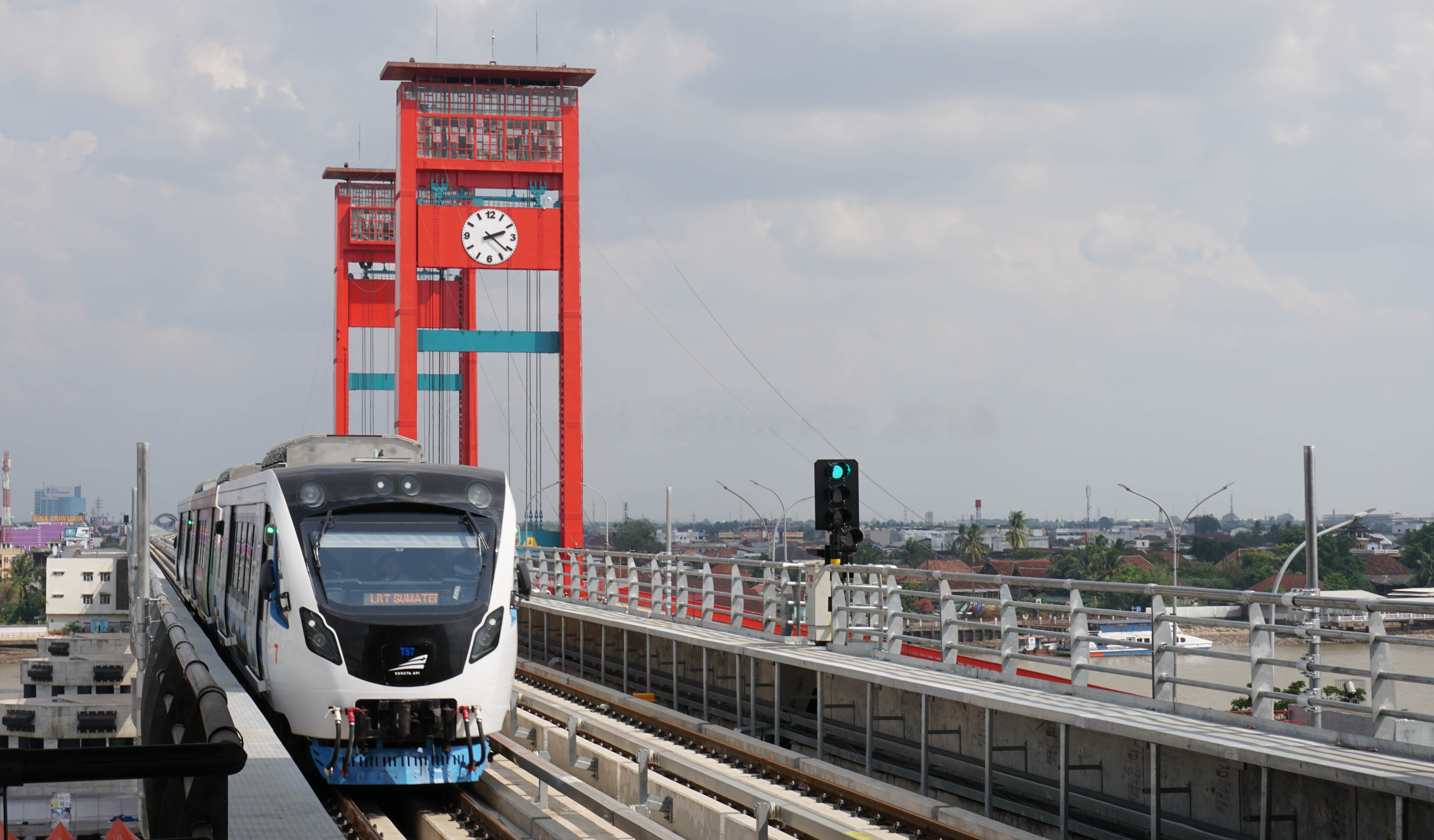
- Ampera Bridge and Palembang LRT in Palembang
- Country: Indonesia
- Province: South Sumatra
- Core city: Palembang
- Regencies: Banyuasin Regency (part); Ogan Ilir Regency (part); Ogan Komering Ilir Regency (part)

Area
  - Metro: 9,886.66 km^{2} (3,817.26 sq mi)

Population
  - Metropolitan area: 2,706,835
- Time zone: UTC+7 (Indonesia Western Time)
- Vehicle registration: BG
- GDP metro: 2023
- Total: ▲Rp 235.236 trillion ▲US$ 15.433 billion ▲US$ 49.426 billion (PPP)
- Per capita: ▲Rp 87.655 million ▲US$ 5,750 ▲US$ 18,417 (PPP)

The Palembang metropolitan area, known locally as Patungraya Agung (an acronym of Palembang–Betung–Indaralaya–Kayu Agung), is a metropolitan area in South Sumatra, Indonesia. It encompasses Palembang as the core city and parts of the three surrounding regencies: Banyuasin Regency, Ogan Ilir Regency, and Ogan Komering Ilir Regency. It is the second-largest metropolitan area in Sumatra with an estimated population of over 2.7 million.

== Definition ==
The official delineation of Patungraya Agung encompasses all 16 districts of the City of Palembang, plus 11 districts of Banyuasin Regency, 7 districts of Ogan Ilir Regency and 4 districts of Ogan Komering Ilir Regency. It covers an area of 9,886.66 km^{2} with a population of 2,706,835 as at mid 2022.

Name	Area in km^{2}.	Pop'n Census 2020	Pop'n Estimate mid 2022
Palembang (all 16 districts of city)	352.51	1,668,848	1,729,546
Banyuasin Regency (11 districts only)	7,532.00	581,185	582,530
Ogan Ilir Regency (7 districts only)	959.07	194,413	201,955
Ogan Komering Ilir Regency (4 districts only)	1,043.08	190,055	192,804
Patangraya Agung	9,886.66	2,634,501	2,706,835

== See also ==
- List of metropolitan areas in Indonesia
- Jakarta metropolitan area
- Medan metropolitan area
- Padang metropolitan area
