= Pangkalan Balai =

Capital of Banyuasin Regency, South Sumatra, Indonesia

Coordinates: 2.90675°S 104.41431°E

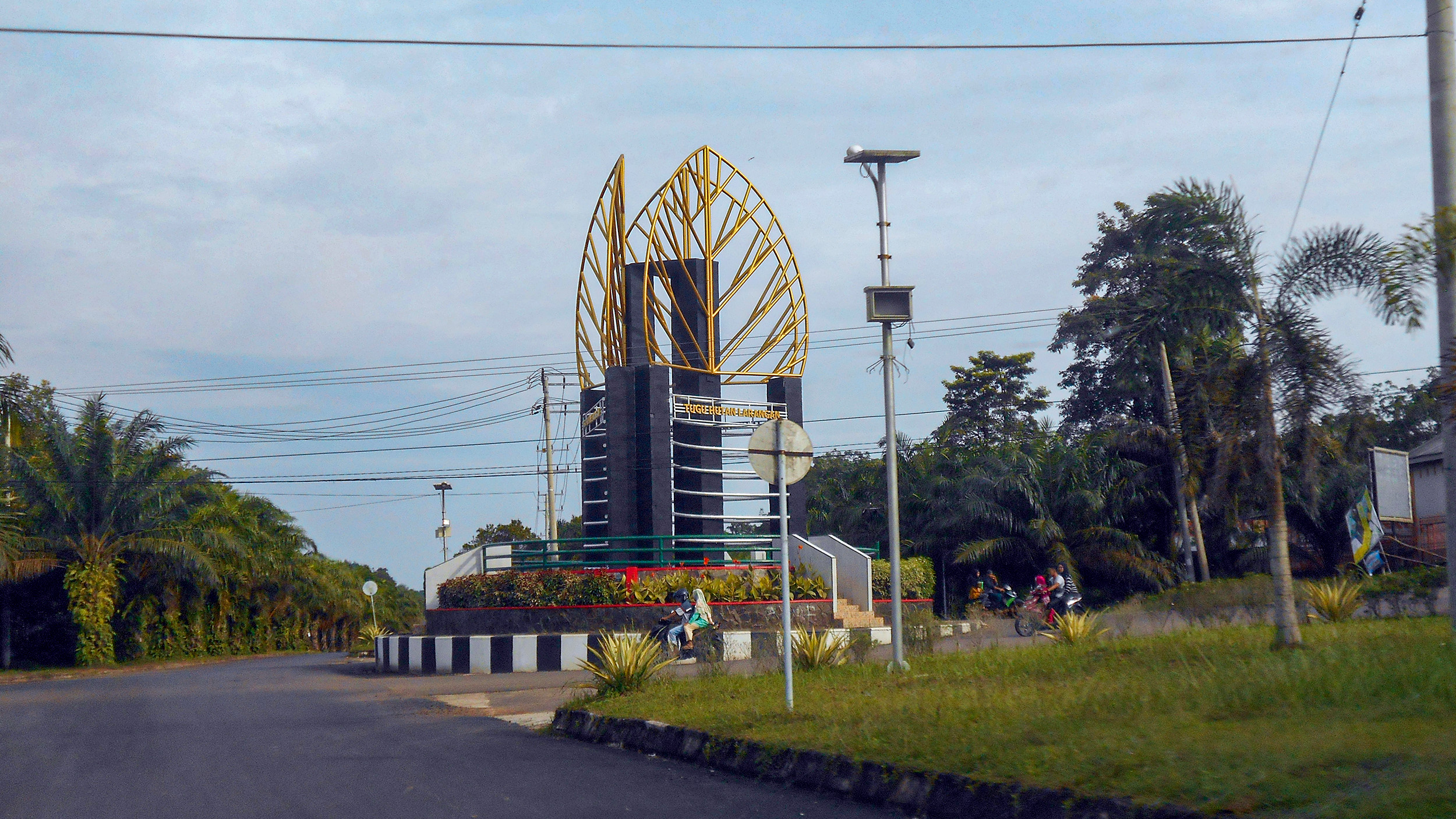
Forbidden Forest Monument Roundabout in Pangkalan Balai

Pangkalan Balai is a town or kelurahan in Banyuasin Regency, of South Sumatra province of Indonesia and it is the seat (capital) of Banyuasin Regency and is also the seat of Banyuasin III District. Pangkalan Balai is an area rich in natural resources, especially coal and oil and gas. The town covers an area of 20.65 km^{2} and had a population in 2024 of 12,249.
