= South Ogan Komering Ulu Regency =

Regency in South Sumatra, Indonesia

Coordinates: 4.6573°S 104.0066°E

South Ogan Komering Ulu Regency Kabupaten Ogan Komering Ulu Selatan
- Regency
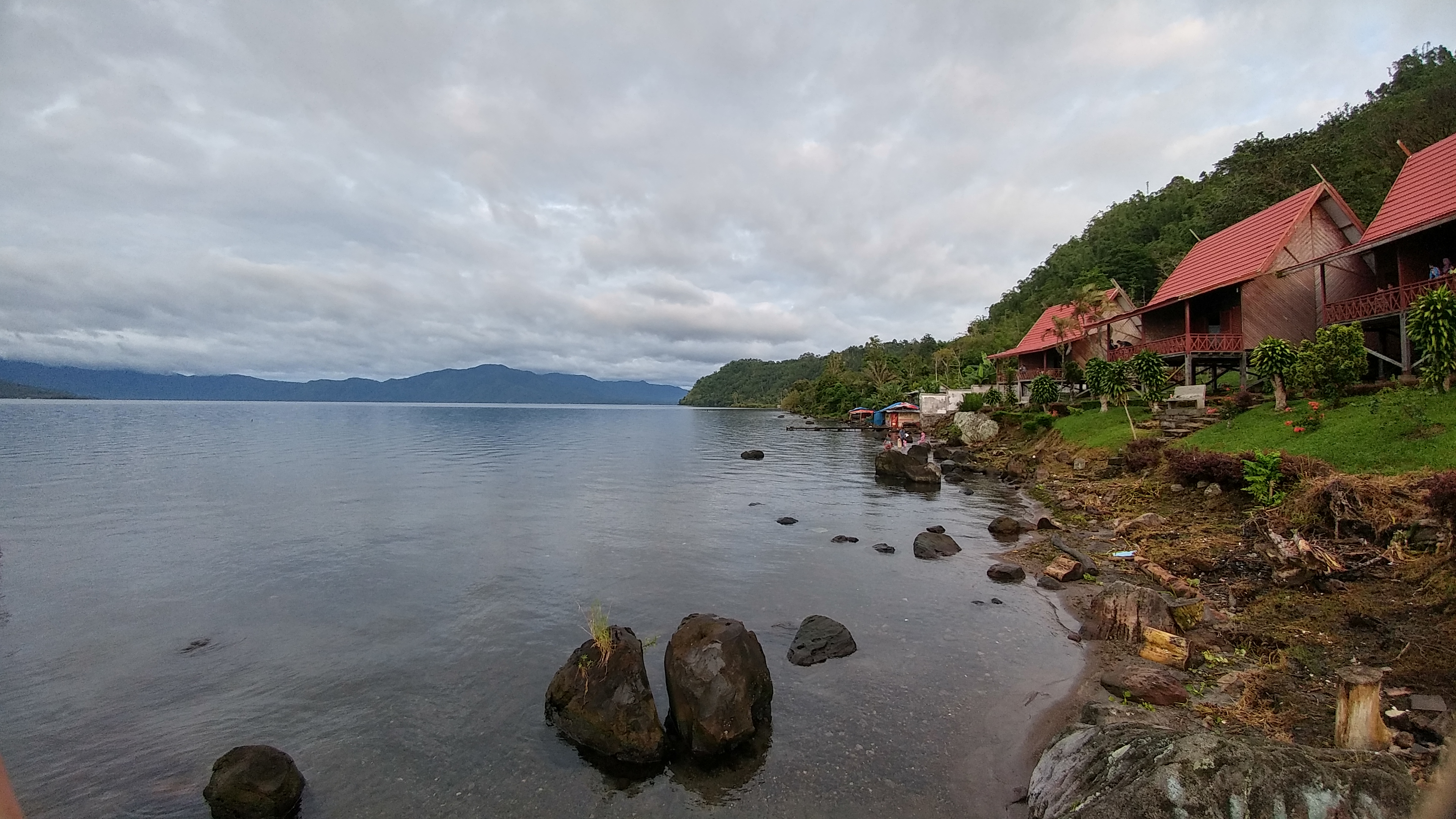
- Lake Ranau

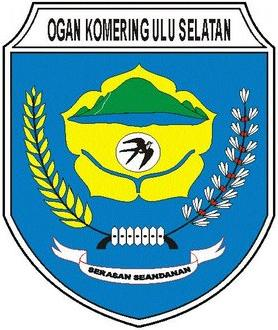
- Coat of arms
- Motto: Serasan Seandanan
- Location in South Sumatra
- Country: Indonesia
- Province: South Sumatra
- Regency seat: Muaradua

Government
  - Regent: Abusama
  - Vice Regent: Misnadi

Area
  - Total: 5,493.94 km^{2} (2,121.22 sq mi)

Population (mid 2025 estimate)
  - Total: 408,280
  - Density: 74.315/km^{2} (192.47/sq mi)
- Time zone: UTC+7 (WIB)

South Ogan Komering Ulu Regency (Kabupaten Ogan Komering Ulu Selatan) is an inland regency in the far south of South Sumatra Province, Indonesia. It was created on 18 December 2003 from what had previously been the southernmost districts of Ogan Komering Ulu Regency. It covers an area of 5,493.94 km^{2}, and had a population of 318,428 at the 2010 Census and 408,981 at the 2020 Census; the official estimate as at mid 2025 was 408,280 (comprising 211,785 males and 196,493 females). The administrative centre is the town of Muaradua (not to be confused with Muara Dua District in Lhokseumawe City, Aceh Province). It borders Ogan Komering Ulu Regency, East Ogan Komering Ulu Regency and Muara Enim Regency to the north. It also borders Lampung Province to the south and east and Bengkulu Province to the west.

== Administrative districts ==
The Regency is administratively composed of nineteen districts (kecamatan). Their areas (in km^{2}) and their populations at the 2010 Census and 2020 Census are tabulated below, together with the official estimates as at mid 2025. The table also includes the locations of the district administrative centres, the number of administrative villages in each district (totaling 252 rural desa and 7 urban kelurahan - the latter including 5 in Muaradua District, plus the administrative centres of Banding Agung and Central BPR Ranau Districts), and its post code.

Kode Wilayah	Name of District (kecamatan)	Area in km^{2}	Pop'n Census 2010	Pop'n Census 2020	Pop'n Estimate mid 2025	Admin centre	No. of villages	Post code
16.09.08	Mekakau Ilir	261.15	17,824	23,917	24,047	Tanjung Besar	15	32276
16.09.03	Banding Agung	276.38	18,710	25,955	26,338	Bandar Agung Ranau	22	32274
16.09.13	Warkuk Ranau Selatan (South Warkuk Ranau)	239.48	20,486	25,032	24,269	Kota Baru	16	32275
16.09.12	Buay Pematang Ribu Ranau Tengah (Central BPR Ranau)	353.20	19,393	25,972	25,930	Simpang Sender	22	32268
16.09.09	Buay Pemaca	714.52	37,768	44,880	44,342	Kota Way	22	32265
16.09.05	Simpang	342.29	13,241	18,086	18,874	Simpang Agung	7	32263
16.09.17	Buana Pemaca	190.10	12,117	15,907	16,950	Jagaraga	8	32264
16.09.01	Muaradua	261.95	39,533	50,076	50,781	Pasar Muaradua	14	32212
16.09.19	Buay Rawan	167.00	12,395	18,767	20,280	Gunung Cahya	11	32211
16.09.06	Buay Sandang Aji	450.00	16,104	21,334	20,877	Gunung Terang	16	32277
16.09.18	Tiga Dihaji	153.45	9,028	11,046	10,118	Surabaya	8	32262
16.09.07	Buay Runjung	171.19	9,673	12,811	12,427	Belambangan	14	32278
16.09.14	Runjung Agung	157.41	10,989	13,978	12,966	Sura	9	32270
16.09.10	Kisam Tinggi	417.00	17,272	19,820	18,707	Tenang	19	32279
16.09.04	Muaradua Kisam	219.80	16,583	20,144	19,857	Muaradua Kisam	18	32271
16.09.11	Kisam Ilir	136.02	6,995	7,963	8,080	Pulau Kemiling	9	32272
16.09.02	Pulau Beringin	476.51	22,484	30,375	30,178	Pulau Beringin	13	32273
16.09.16	Sindang Danau	210.00	8,561	11,408	11,595	Ulu Danau	7	32266
16.09.15	Sungai Are (Are River)	296.49	9,272	11,510	11,664	Simpang Luas	9	32267
	Totals	5,493.94	318,428	408,981	408,280	Muaradua	259	
