= Ogan Komering Ilir Regency =

Regency in South Sumatra, Indonesia

Ogan Komering Ilir Regency Kabupaten Ogan Komering Ilir OKI Regency
- Regency
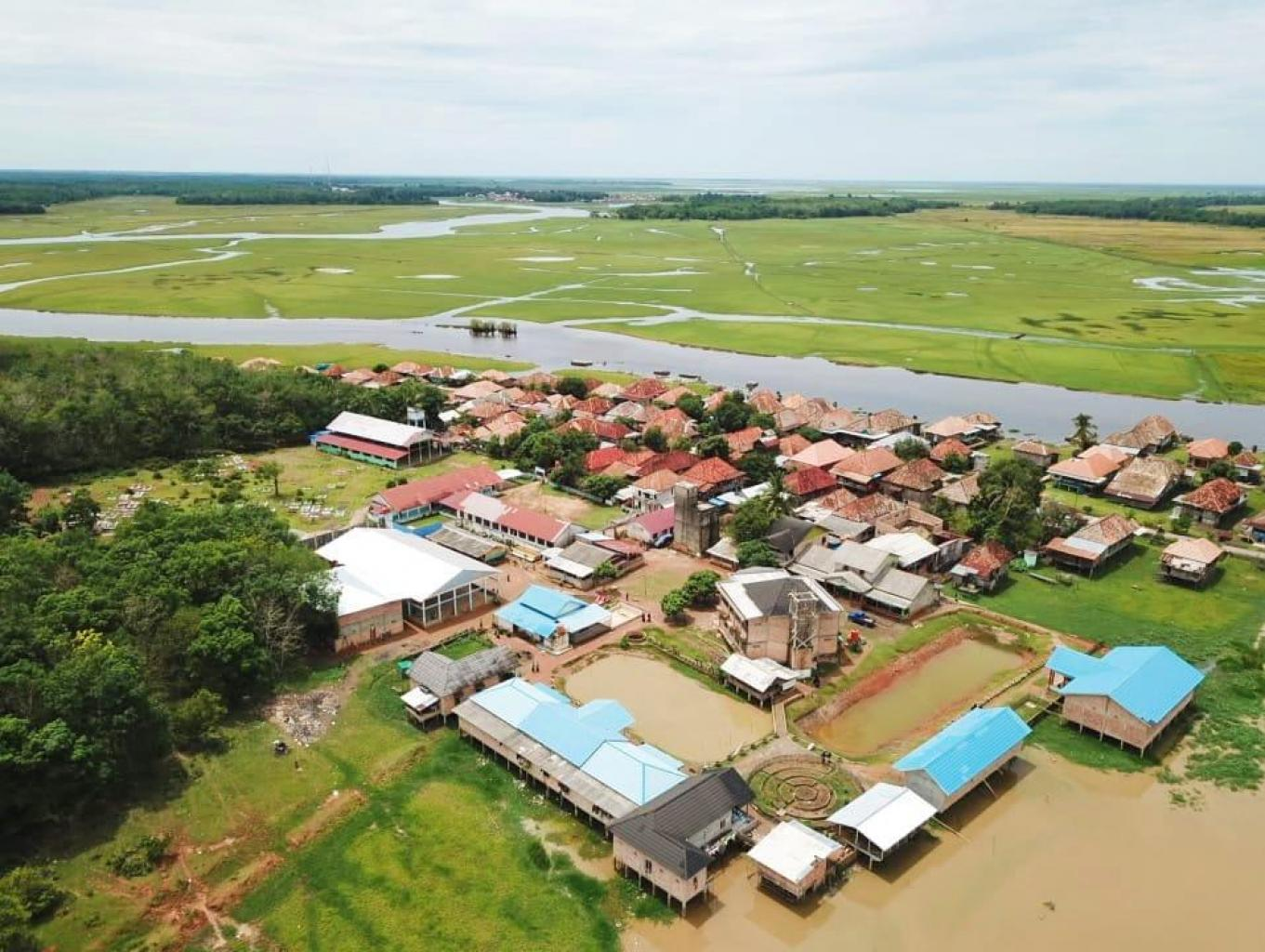
- The village of Bangsal lies on a swamp

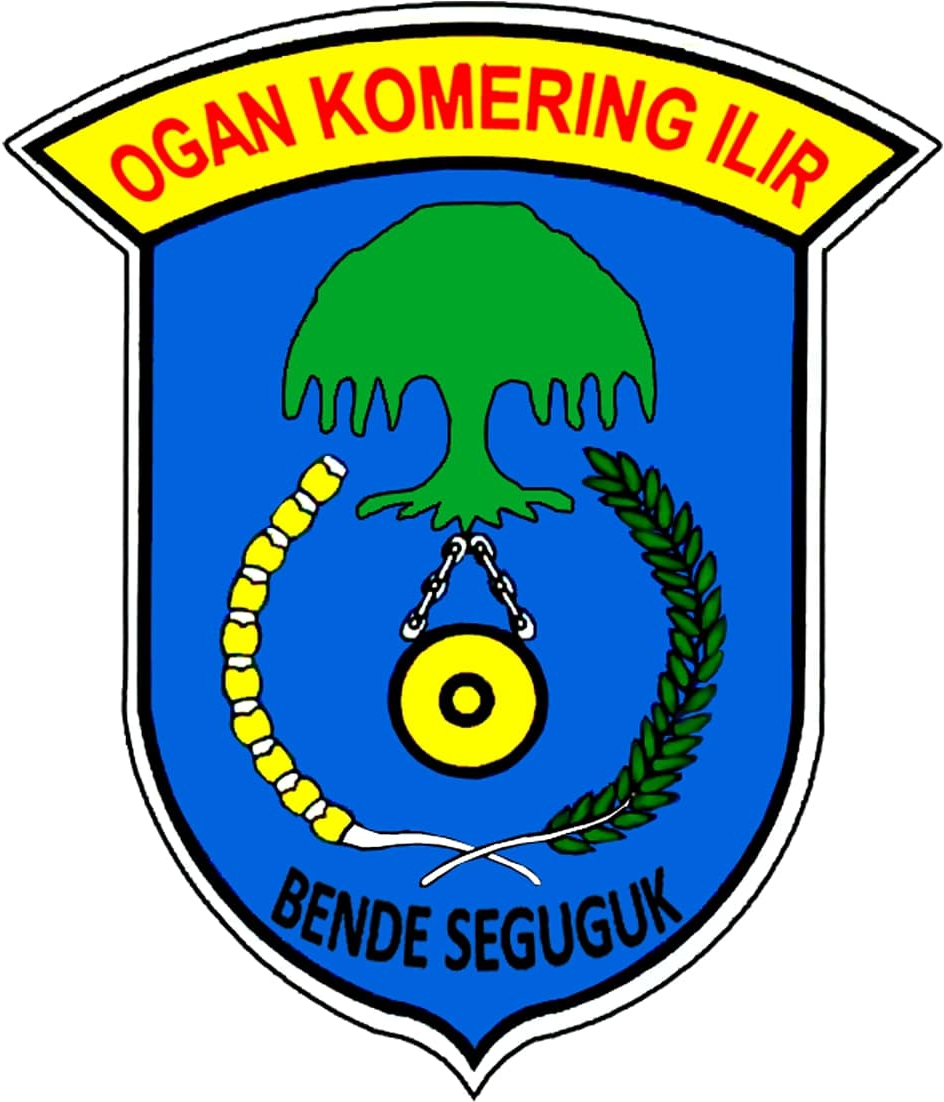
- Coat of arms
- Nickname: OKI
- Motto: Bende Seguguk (Gong Satu Kesatuan/The Unity Gong)
- Location within South Sumatera
- Coordinates: 2.30°S 104.20°E
- Sovereign state: Indonesia
- Province: South Sumatra
- Regency seat: Kayu Agung
- Onder Afdeeling (Dutch rule): as Ogan Ilir and Komering Ilir ca.1900
- Karesidenan: as Palembang ca.1945
- Kabupaten (Regency): since 1956

Government
  - Type: Regency
  - Regent / Bupati: Muchendi Mahzareki (Democratic)
  - Vice Regent / Wakil Bupati: Supriyanto

Area
  - Total: 17,075.71 km^{2} (6,592.97 sq mi)

Population (mid 2025 estimate)
  - Total: 820,658
  - Density: 48.0600/km^{2} (124.475/sq mi)
  - Ethnicity: Malay Komering Kayuagung Javanese Balinese
- Time zone: UTC+7 (Western Indonesia Time)
- Postcode: 306xx
- Area code: + 62 712 : 0712
- Distance from Kayuagung to Palembang: 65 km
- Website: go.kaboki.go.id

Ogan Komering Ilir Regency (abbreviation OKI) is a regency of South Sumatra Province, Indonesia. It takes its name from the Ogan River and the Komering River, which are the two main rivers that drain the area. The name Ilir means downstream (there are other regencies in the province named Ogan Komering Ulu, South Ogan Komering Ulu and East Ogan Komering Ulu; Ulu means upstream). The administrative centre is the town of Kayu Agung. The regency borders Banyuasin Regency to the northwest, Bangka Strait, and the Java Sea to the east, Lampung Province to the south, and Palembang city, Ogan Ilir Regency, and East Ogan Komering Ulu Regency to the west.

It has an area of 17,075.71 km^{2} and a population of 727,376 at the 2010 Census and 769,348 at the 2020 Census; the official estimate as at mid 2025 was 820,658 people (consisting of 421,164 males and 399,494 females). The regency contains the Ogan-Komering Ilir floodplain lakes, an area of wetland covering about 200,000 hectares. Major crops include coffee, sugar cane, oil palm, rubber, cocoa bean, pineapple, tea and fish.

== Administrative districts ==
Following the splitting off in December 2003 of the most western districts of this regency to form a separate Ogan Ilir Regency, this Regency is administratively composed of eighteen districts (kecamatan), listed below with their areas (in km^{2}) and their populations at the 2010 and 2020 Censuses, together with the official estimates as at mid 2025. The table also includes the locations of the district administrative centres, the number of villages in each district (there are 327 villages in all comprising 13 urban kelurahan and 314 rural desa) and its postal code.

| Kode Wilayah | Name of District (kecamatan) | Area in km^{2} | Pop'n Census 2010 | Pop'n Census 2020 | Pop'n Estimate mid 2025 | Admin centre | No. of villages | Post code |
|---|---|---|---|---|---|---|---|---|
| 16.02.13 | Lempuing | 295.47 | 70,642 | 73,004 | 78,753 | Tugumulyo | 19 | 30657 |
| 16.02.22 | Lempuing Jaya | 506.69 | 59,786 | 62,543 | 66,922 | Lubuk Seberuk | 16 | 30657 |
| 16.02.04 | Mesuji | 224.30 | 38,870 | 41,147 | 46,175 | Pematang Panggang | 17 | 30681 |
| 16.02.15 | Sungai Menang (Menang River) | 1,992.24 | 46,567 | 34,830 | 34,197 | Sungai Menang | 18 | 30684 |
| 16.02.20 | Mesuji Makmur | 478.69 | 51,456 | 56,332 | 59,339 | Catur Tunggai | 19 | 30682 |
| 16.02.21 | Mesuji Raya | 532.47 | 34,334 | 37,896 | 39,709 | Kemang Indah | 17 | 30683 |
| 16.02.11 | Tulung Selapan | 4,485.13 | 40,683 | 46,561 | 51,338 | Tulung Selapan Ulu | 23 ^{(a)} | 30655 |
| 16.02.18 | Cengal | 2,631.27 | 42,778 | 37,222 | 37,284 | Cengal | 17 | 30658 |
| 16.02.03 | Pedamaran | 383.35 | 40,114 | 44,548 | 49,744 | Menang Raya | 14 | 30672 |
| 16.02.24 | Pedamaran Timur (East Pedamaran) | 671.38 | 20,110 | 21,867 | 24,098 | Sumber Hidup | 7 | 30670 |
| 16.02.02 | Tanjung Lubuk | 219.89 | 32,296 | 35,355 | 35,772 | Pulau Gemantung Ilir (de facto) | 22 ^{(b)} | 30671 |
| 16.02.23 | Teluk Gelam (Gelam Bay) | 164.00 | 21,268 | 24,707 | 25,316 | Seriguna | 14 | 30673 |
| 16.02.05 | Kota Kayu Agung (Kaya Agung town) | 224.30 | 62,694 | 75,976 | 81,856 | Cinta Raja | 25 ^{(c)} | 30617 & 30618 |
| 16.02.08 | Sirah Pulau Padang | 110.22 | 41,709 | 45,161 | 47,181 | Terate | 20 | 30651 |
| 16.02.17 | Jejawi | 227.02 | 38,098 | 39,042 | 43,076 | Jejawi | 19 | 30652 |
| 16.02.12 | Pampangan | 481.54 | 27,758 | 29,876 | 31,934 | Pampangan | 22 | 30654 |
| 16.02.19 | Pangkalan Lampam | 1,091.33 | 26,033 | 27,471 | 30,178 | Pangkalan Lampam | 19 | 30659 |
| 16.02.14 | Air Sugihan | 1,928.14 | 32,180 | 35,810 | 37,786 | Kertamukti | 19 | 30656 |
| | Totals | 17,075.71 | 727,376 | 769,348 | 820,658 | Kota Kayu Agung | 327 | |

Note: (a) includes the kelurahan of Ujung Tanjung. (b) includes the kelurahan of Tanjung Lubuk.
(c) comprising 11 kelurahan (Cintaraja, Jua-jua, Kayu Agung, Kedaton, Kutaraja, Mangun Jaya, Paku, Perigi, Sidakersa, Sukadana and Tanjung Rancing) and 14 desa.

The four districts of Kota Kayu Agung, Sirah Pulau Padang, Jejawi and Pampangan, in the northwest of the regency, with a combined area of 1,043.08 km^{2} and an estimated population of 204,047 in mid 2025, form part of the Palembang metropolitan area.

== History ==
In the Dutch colonial period, the region was included in the territory of South Sumatra and Sub Residency (Afdeeling) Palembang and Tanah Datar with its capital of Palembang. The afdeeling was divided into several onder afdeeling, and Ogan Komering Ilir region covers the former areas of onder afdeeling Komering Ilir and onder afdeeling Ogan Ilir.

After the Republic of Indonesia's independence, the territory of Ogan Komering Ilir was included in the residency of Palembang, which included 26 marga. Then, based on the Emergency Act No.4/1956 on the Establishment of the Autonomous Region Regencies in South Sumatra Province, Ogan Komering Ilir became one of the regencies in the province of South Sumatra. After the dissolution of the marga, Ogan Komering Ilir regency was divided into 12 districts and 4 "districts with definitive representation".

By 1996 Ogan Komering Ilir Regency had 14 districts and 4 "districts with definitive representation". For the latter four districts such representation provided Pematang Panggang District (now Sungai Menang District) with Mesuji District as its "parent district", Cengal District with the Tulung Selapan District as its "parent district", Rantau Alai District with Tanjung Raja District as its "parent district", and Jejawi District with Sirah Pulau Padang District as its "parent district". Subsequently in 2001 the government restructured the four "districts with definitive representation" into full districts, so Ogan Komering Ilir thus had 18 districts.

Based on Presidential Decree No.37/2003 on the Establishment of East Ogan Komering Ulu, Ogan Komering Ilir and Ogan Ilir in South Sumatra Province, Ogan Komering Ilir Regency was divided into two regencies, namely a reduced Ogan Komering Ilir Regency and a new Ogan Ilir Regency. Ogan Ilir Regency included the 6 districts of Inderalaya (as the capital), Tanjung Raja, Tanjung Batu, Muara Kuang, Pemulutan and Rantau Alai. After this expansion, Ogan Komering Ilir regency consisted of 12 districts.

Then, in accordance with Regencies Act No.5/2005, five of the existing Ogan Komering Ilir regencies were divided to create six new districts, namely Lempuing Jaya (from part of Lempuing), Mesuji Makmur and Mesuji Raya (from part of Mesuji), East Pedamaran (from part of Pedamaran), Teluk Gelam (from part of Tanjung Lubuk), and Pangkalan Lampam (from part of Pampangan). After this restructuring Ogan Komering Ilir Regency has 18 administrative districts.
