= Ogan Ilir Regency =

Regency in South Sumatra, Indonesia

Ogan Ilir Regency Kabupaten Ogan Ilir OI Regency
- Regency
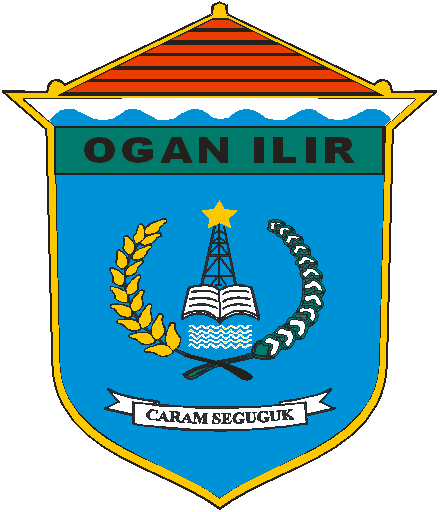
- Coat of arms
- Nickname: OI
- Motto: Caram Seguguk (Kebersamaan dan Gotong Royong/Togetherness and Mutual Cooperation)
- Location within South Sumatera
- Coordinates: 3.02°S 104.48°E
- Sovereign state: Indonesia
- province: South Sumatra
- Regency seat: Indralaya
- Onder Afdeeling (Dutch rule): as Ogan Ilir ca.1900
- Karesidenan: as Palembang ca.1945
- Kabupaten (Regency): as Ogan Komering Ilir since 1956
- Kabupaten (Regency): since 2003

Government
  - Type: Regency
  - Regent / Bupati: Panca Wijaya Akbar
  - Vice Regent / Wakil Bupati: Ardani

Area
  - Total: 2,382.48 km^{2} (919.88 sq mi)

Population (mid 2025 estimate)
  - Total: 452,275
  - Density: 189.834/km^{2} (491.667/sq mi)
  - Ethnicity: Malay (Ogan Pegagan Penesak) Javanese
- Time zone: UTC+7 (Western Indonesia Time)
- Postcode: 306xx, 308xx
- Area codes: + 62 711 : 0711, + 62 712 : 0712
- Distance from Inderalaya to Palembang: 32 km
- Website: oganilirkab.go.id

Ogan Ilir Regency (often abbreviated to OI Regency) is a regency of South Sumatra Province, Indonesia. It takes its name from the main river which stream that area, Ogan River. And the name Ilir means downstream. Indralaya is the regency seat. The regency borders Palembang City and Muara Enim Regency to the north, Ogan Komering Ilir Regency to the east, Ogan Komering Ilir Regency, and East Ogan Komering Ulu Regency to the south, and Muara Enim Regency to the west.

Ogan Ilir Regency covers an area of 2,666.07 km², and had a population of 380,904 at the 2010 Census and 416,549 at the 2020 Census; the official estimate as at mid 2025 was 452,275 (comprising 228,935 males and 223,340 females).

== Administrative districts ==
Based on Presidential Decree No.37/2003, Ogan Komering Ilir Regency was divided on 18 December 2003 into two regencies, namely a reduced Ogan Komering Ilir Regency and a new Ogan Ilir Regency. Ogan Ilir Regency then included the six districts of Indralaya (as the capital), Tanjung Raja, Tanjung Batu, Muara Kuang, Pemulutan and Rantau Alai. Subsequently a further ten districts have been added by splitting of the original six.

This Regency is now administratively composed of sixteen districts (kecamatan), comprising 241 villages. These are listed below with their areas (in km^{2}) and their populations at the 2010 Census and the 2020 Census, together with the official estimates as at mid 2025. They are grouped below into two geographical sectors (without administrative status) - a northern sector (which forms part of the Palembang metropolitan area) and a southern sector (outside the metropolitan area, with a much lower average population density). The table also includes the locations of the district administrative centres, the number of administrative villages in each district (totaling 227 rural desa and 14 urban kelurahan), and its postal codes.

Kode Wilayah	Name of District (kecamatan)	Area in km^{2}	Pop'n Census 2010	Pop'n Census 2020	Pop'n Estimate mid 2025	Admin centre	No. of Villages	Post code
16.10.01	Muara Kuang	300.75	17,430	19,759	21,394	Muara Kuang	14 ^{(a)}	30865
16.10.14	Rambang Kuang	528.82	19,780	20,838	21,553	Tambang Rambang	13	30869
16.10.15	Lubuk Keliat	207.67	16,484	17,755	18,777	Betung II	10	30868
16.10.02	Tanjung Batu	263.75	42,158	46,931	50,468	Tanjung Batu Timur	21 ^{(b)}	30665
16.10.16	Payaraman	180.57	21,728	25,909	27,951	Payaraman Timur	13 ^{(c)}	30664
16.10.06	Rantau Alai	62.16	10,713	10,801	11,977	Rantai Alai	13	30866
16.10.13	Kandis	50.25	10,293	10,635	11,449	Kandis II	12	30867
Sub-totals for	Southern Sector	1,593.97	138,586	152,628	163,569		96	
16.10.03	Tanjung Raja	70.41	40,873	43,612	46,738	Tanjung Raja Utara	19 ^{(d)}	30663
16.10.11	Rantau Panjang	40.85	16,481	17,029	18,376	Rantau Panjang Ulu	12	30661
16.10.12	Sungai Pinang	42.62	23,122	25,896	27,773	Sungai Pinang	13 ^{(e)}	30662
16.10.05	Pemulutan	122.92	40,708	46,128	50,967	Pemulutan Ulu	25	20663
16.10.09	Pemulutan Selatan (South Pemulutan)	61.49	16,426	16,710	18,615	Sungai Lebung (Lebung River)	15	30663
16.10.10	Pemulutan Barat (West Pemulutan)	60.00	12,428	13,799	14,988	Talang Pangeran Ulu	11	30663
16.10.04	Indralaya	101.22	37,553	40,634	44,712	Indralaya Mulya	20 ^{(f)}	30862 ^{(g)}
16.10.07	Indralaya Utara (North Indralaya)	472.33	34,421	38,027	43,107	Tanjung Pering	16 ^{(h)}	30862 ^{(i)}
16.10.08	Indralaya Selatan (South Indralaya)	100.26	20,306	22,086	23,430	Meranjat III	14	30862
Sub-totals for	Northern Sector	1,072.10	242,318	263,921	288,706		145	
Totals for	Regency	2,667.07	380,904	416,549	452,275	Indralaya	241	

Notes: (a) including one kelurahan - Muara Kuang. (b) including two kelurahan - Tanjung Batu and Tanjung Batu Timur. (c) including two kelurahan - Payaraman Barat and Payaraman Timur.
(d) including four kelurahan - Tanjung Raja, Tanjung Raja Barat, Tanjung Raja Timur and Tanjung Raja Utara. (e) including one kelurahan - Sungai Pinang.
(f) including three kelurahan - Indralaya Indah, Indralaya Mulya and Indralaya Raya. (g) except for four villages - Sakatiga Seberang (with post code of 30814),
Tanjung Sejaro (with post code of 30815), Sakatiga (with post code of 30816) and Tanjung Seteko (with post code of 30817).
(h) including one kelurahan - Timbangan. (i) except for two villages - Payakabung (with post code of 30812) and Tanjung Pering (with post code of 30813).

The nine Northern districts of Tanjung Raya, Rantau Panjang, Sungai Pinang, Pemulutan, Pemulutan Selatan, Pemulutan Barat, Indralaya, Indralaya Utara and Indralaya Selatan, with a combined area of 1,072.10 km^{2} and a population of 288,706 in mid 2025, form part of the Palembang metropolitan area.
