= Martapura, South Sumatra =

Town in East Ogan Komering Ulu Regency, Sumatra

Coordinates: 4.264682°S 104.3122773°E

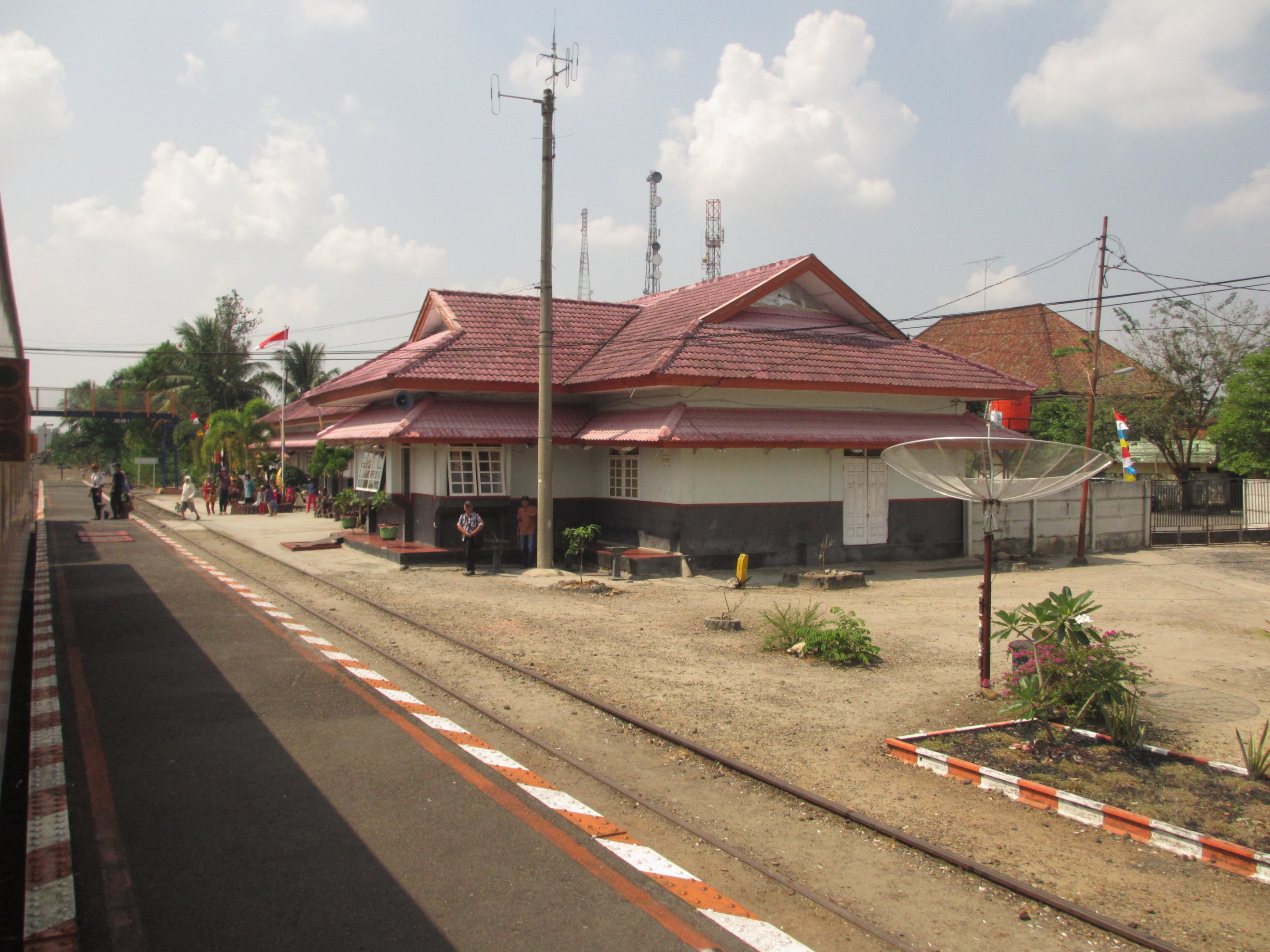
Martapura station

Martapura is a town and administrative district (kecamatan) in East Ogan Komering Ulu Regency, of South Sumatra province of Indonesia and it is the seat (capital) of East Ogan Komering Ulu Regency. The district covers an area of 102.16 km^{2} and had a population of 60,177 according to the official estimate for mid 2024.
