= East Ogan Komering Ulu Regency =

Regency in South Sumatra, Indonesia

Coordinates: 3.8568°S 104.7521°E

East Ogan Komering Ulu Regency Kabupaten Ogan Komering Ulu Timur
- Regency
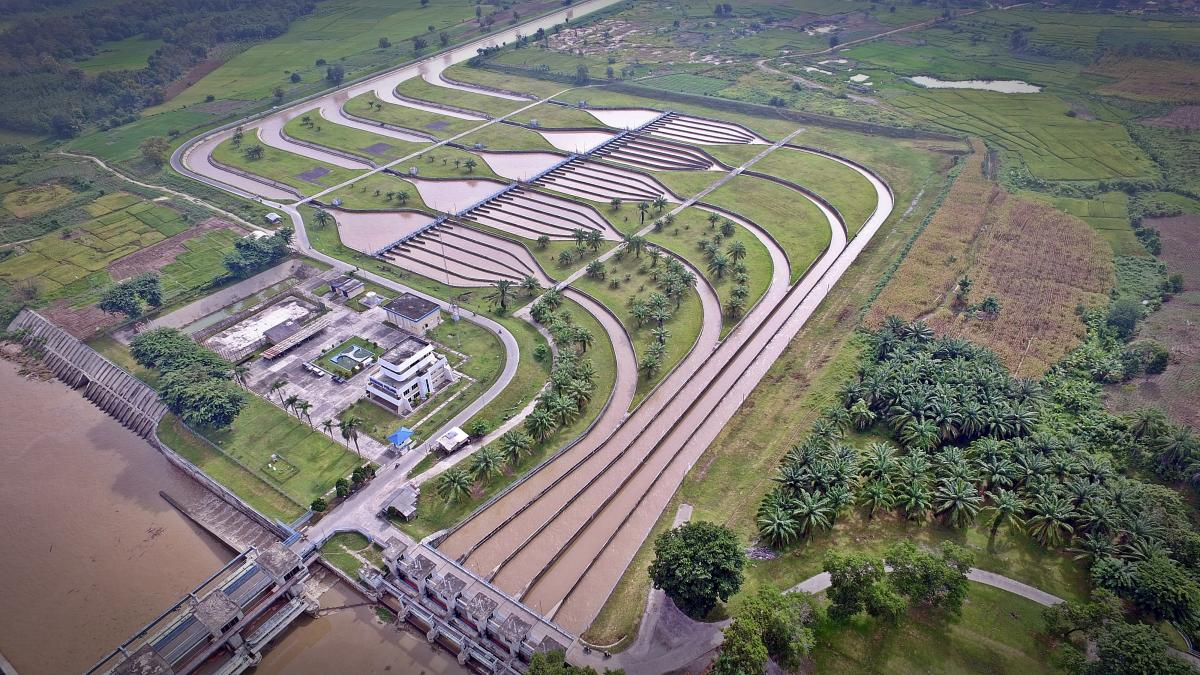
- Perjaya Dam

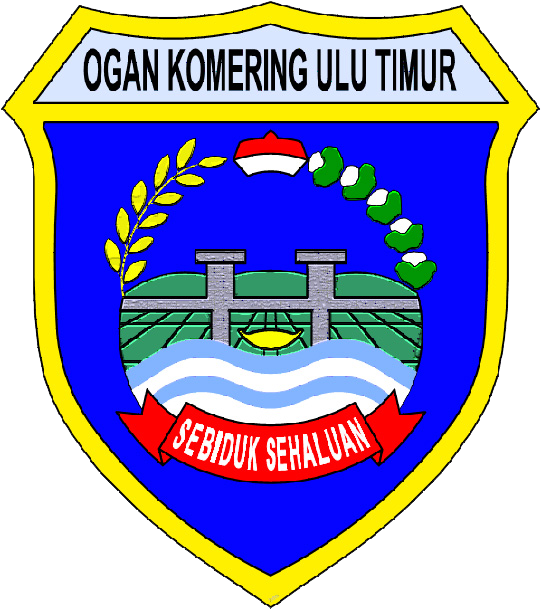
- Coat of arms
- Motto: Sebiduk Sehaluan (A boat with one destination)
- Location in South Sumatra
- Country: Indonesia
- Province: South Sumatra
- Regency seat: Martapura

Government
  - Regent: Lanosin Hamzah
  - Vice Regent: Adi Nugraha Purna Yudha

Area
  - Total: 3,370 km^{2} (1,300 sq mi)

Population (mid 2025 estimate)
  - Total: 706,334
  - Density: 210/km^{2} (543/sq mi)
- Time zone: UTC+7 (WIB)

East Ogan Komering Ulu Regency (Kabupaten Ogan Komering Ulu Timur) is a regency of South Sumatra Province, Indonesia. It was created on 18 December 2003 from what had formerly been the eastern districts of Ogan Komering Ulu Regency. It covers an area of 3,370 km^{2} and had a population of 609,982 at the 2010 Census and 649,853 at the 2020 Census; the official estimate as at mid 2025 was 706,334 (comprising 360,715 males and 345,619 females). The regency seat is the town of Martapura. It borders Ogan Ilir Regency to the north, Ogan Komering Ulu Regency to the west, Ogan Komering Ilir Regency in the east and Lampung Province and South Ogan Komering Ulu Regency in the south.

== Administrative districts ==
This Regency is administratively composed of twenty districts (kecamatan), comprising 191 villages. Their areas (in km^{2}) and their populations at the 2010 and 2020 Censuses are listed below, together with the official estimates as at mid 2025. The table also includes the locations of the district administrative centres, the number of administrative villages in each district (totaling 305 rural desa and 7 urban kelurahan - the latter all in Martapura District), and its post code.

| Kode Wilayah | Name of District (kecamatan) | Area in km^{2} | Pop'n Census 2010 | Pop'n Census 2020 | Pop'n Estimate mid 2025 | Admin centre | No. of villages | Post code |
|---|---|---|---|---|---|---|---|---|
| 16.08.01 | Martapura | 102.16 | 48,141 | 54,806 | 61,247 | Martapura | 16 ^{(a)} | 32311: 32319 |
| 16.08.11 | Bunga Mayang | 113.54 | 15,841 | 17,460 | 19,295 | Negeri Ratu | 8 | 32387 |
| 16.08.16 | Jayapura | 230.17 | 11,635 | 14,957 | 17,469 | Bunga Mayang | 8 | 32381 |
| 16.08.05 | Buay Pemuka Peliung | 154.13 | 31,514 | 33,733 | 36,991 | Pulau Negara | 13 | 32367 |
| 16.08.02 | Buay Madang | 114.36 | 35,689 | 37,036 | 39,853 | Kurungan Nyawa | 17 | 32361 |
| 16.08.12 | Buay Madang Timur (East Buay Madang) | 156.25 | 53,450 | 56,277 | 60,085 | Karang Tengah | 30 | 32360 |
| 16.08.20 | Buay Pemuka Bangsa Raja | 192.95 | 11,055 | 11,914 | 13,079 | Muncak Kabau | 7 | 32364 |
| 16.08.06 | Madang Suku II | 129.34 | 28,522 | 30,372 | 32,885 | Kota Negara | 19 | 32366 |
| 16.08.13 | Madang Suku III | 195.32 | 23,670 | 25,295 | 25,880 | Batumarta VI | 10 | 32365 |
| 16.08.07 | Madang Suku I | 211.25 | 34,019 | 35,493 | 39,552 | Rasuan | 13 | 32362 |
| 16.08.18 | Belitang Madang Raya | 163.59 | 40,837 | 44,704 | 48,689 | Tugu Mulyo | 16 | 32363 |
| 16.08.03 | Belitang | 354.50 | 50,509 | 51,300 | 55,014 | Gumawang | 23 | 32382 |
| 16.08.17 | Belitang Jaya | 91.97 | 18,204 | 20,296 | 21,987 | Karsa Jaya | 13 | 32380 |
| 16.08.10 | Belitang III | 153.87 | 32,951 | 35,413 | 37,799 | Nusa Bakti | 20 | 32385 |
| 16.08.09 | Belitang II | 153.59 | 39,746 | 41,961 | 45,254 | Sumber Jaya | 24 | 32383 |
| 16.08.19 | Belitang Mulya | 45.97 | 19,853 | 20,735 | 22,178 | Petanggan | 12 | 32388 |
| 16.08.08 | Semendawai Suku III | 297.77 | 36,842 | 39,221 | 42,546 | Sriwangi | 19 | 32386 |
| 16.08.15 | Semendawai Timur (East Semendawai) | 183.27 | 32,693 | 33,298 | 36,843 | Burnai Mulya | 19 | 32385 |
| 16.08.04 | Cempaka | 101.00 | 25,263 | 25,629 | 26,981 | Cempaka | 13 | 32384 |
| 16.08.14 | Semendawai Barat (West Semendawai) | 225.00 | 19,548 | 19,953 | 22,707 | Betung | 12 | 32384 |
| | Totals | 3,370.00 | 609,982 | 649,853 | 706,334 | Martapura | 312 | |

Note: (a) comprising 7 kelurahan (Bukit Sari, Dusun Martapura, Paku Sengkunyit, Pasar Martapura, Sungai Tuha Jaya, Terukis Rahayu and Veteran Jaya) and 9 desa.

== Economy ==
The regency is one of the major rice producing areas of South Sumatra, mainly concentrated in the Belitang District, Buay Madang District, Cempaka District and Martapura Districts with a large-scale irrigation scheme covering some 120,000 hectares. Other crops include rubber, coffee, black pepper, coconut, palm oil and fruits such as orange, durian, duku, rambutan and banana.

== Notable people ==
Former Constitutional Court judge Ahmad Natabaya was born in the regency in the village of Cempaka.
