= Sekayu, Indonesia =

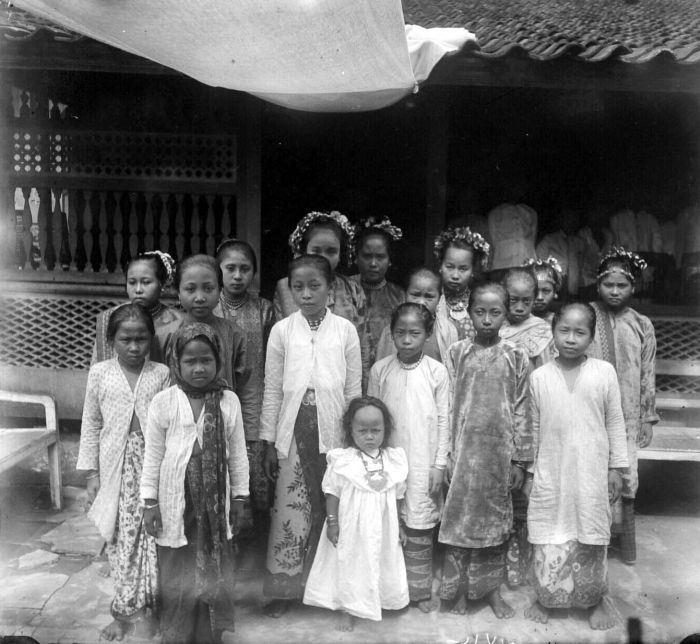
Festive gathering in Sekayu

Sekayu is a town and district which serves as the administrative centre of Musi Banyuasin Regency within South Sumatra Province, Sumatra, Indonesia. The district's population was 78,637 at the 2010 Census and 91,120 at the 2020 Census; the official estimate as at mid 2024 was 103,368. The district comprises 14 small towns and villages, of which 4 are kelurahan (urban villages) and ten are desa (rural villages) as follows:

Name	Area in km^{2}	Population Census 2020
Rimbah Ukur	19.00	2,742
Sungai Medak	11.00	1,456
Sungai Batang	11.00	1,643
Sukarami	83.00	4,379
Soak Baru ^{(a)}	105.70	8,096
Balai Agung ^{(a)}	85.60	21,602
Serasan Jaya ^{(a)}	40.30	11,776
Kayuara ^{(a)}	33.00	11,587
Lumpatan	55.60	5,280
Bailangu	33.30	4,459
Muara Teladan	97.00	5,139
Bandar Jaya	42.00	3,185
Lumpatan II	58.40	5,517
Bailangu Timur	26.70	4,256
Totals	701.60	91,117

Note: (a) urban village (kelurahan); the rest are rural villages (desa).
