= Banyuasin Regency =

Regency in South Sumatra, Indonesia

Banyuasin Regency Kabupaten Banyuasin
- Regency

Other transcription(s)
  - Musi: Ayomasen
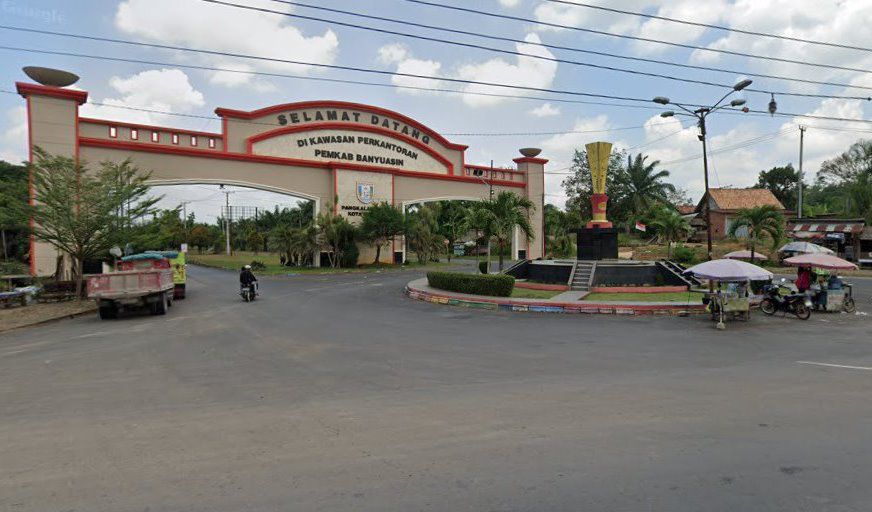
- Government complex in Pangkalan Balai

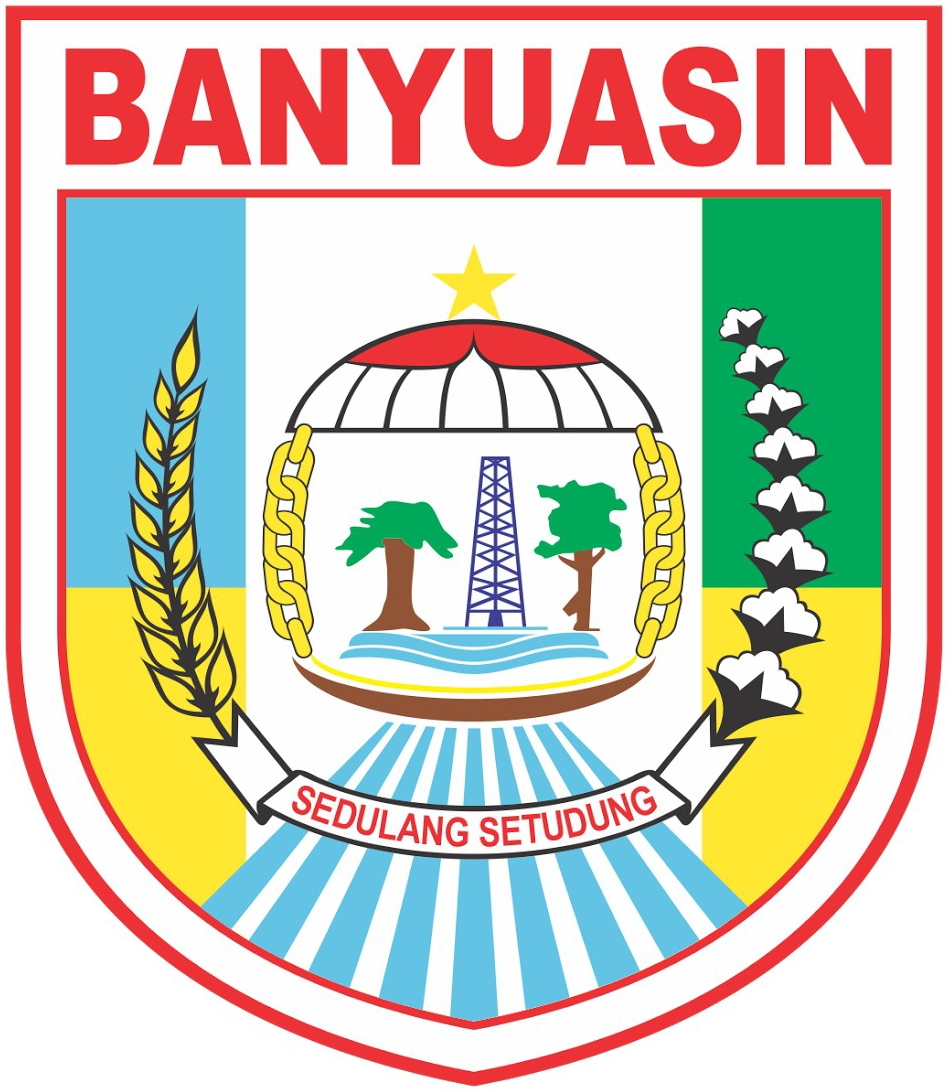
- Coat of arms
- Etymology: ꦧꦚꦸꦲꦱꦶꦤ꧀ (Javanese); Banyuasin "Seawater"
- Motto: Sedulang Setudung (Musi) "Unity in Diversity"
- Location within South Sumatera
- Coordinates: 2.16°S 104.15°E
- Sovereign state: Indonesia
- Province: South Sumatra
- Regency seat: Pangkalan Balai
- Onder Afdeeling (Dutch rule): ca.1900
- Karesidenan: as Palembang ca.1945
- Kabupaten (Regency): as Musi Banyuasin
- Kabupaten (Regency): since 2002

Government
  - Type: Regency
  - Regent / Bupati: Askolani Jasi (PDIP)
  - Vice Regent / Wakil Bupati: Netta Indian

Area
  - Total: 12,258.58 km^{2} (4,733.06 sq mi)

Population (mid 2025 estimate)
  - Total: 910,632
  - Density: 74.2853/km^{2} (192.398/sq mi)
  - Ethnic groups: Javanese; Musi; Palembang
- Time zone: UTC+7 (Western Indonesia Time)
- Postcode: 309xx
- Area code: + 62 711 : 0711
- Distance from Pangkalan Balai to Palembang: 63 km
- Website: banyuasinkab.go.id

Banyuasin Regency (Musi: Ayomasen) is a regency of South Sumatra Province in Indonesia. The Regency was formed on 10 April 2002 from the coastal and eastern areas formerly part of the Musi Banyuasin Regency. It takes its name from the main river which drains that area, the Banyuasin River. Pangkalan Balai is the regency seat. The regency borders Musi Banyuasin Regency, Jambi province and Bangka Strait to the north, Bangka Strait to the east, Ogan Komering Ilir Regency, Muara Enim Regency, and the city of Palembang (which it almost surrounds on most sides) to the south, and Musi Banyuasin Regency to the west. It has a land area of 12,258.59 km^{2} and had a population of 749,107 at the 2010 census and 836,914 at the 2020 census; the official estimate as at mid 2025 was 910,632 (comprising 465,361 males and 445,271 females). Much of the regency is coastal lowland, but in the south it also includes many suburban areas within the Palembang metropolitan area.

== Administrative districts ==
As at 2010, the Banyuasin Regency was subdivided into fifteen districts (kecamatan), subsequently increased by six to twenty-one districts which are listed below with their areas and their populations at the 2010 and 2020 censuses, together with the official estimates as at mid 2025. The table also includes the location of the district administrative centres, the number of administrative villages in each district (totaling 288 rural desa and 25 urban kelurahan), and its post code.

Kode Wilayah	Name of District (kecamatan)	Area in km^{2}	Pop'n 2010 census	Pop'n 2020 census	Pop'n mid 2025 estimate	Admin centre	No. of villages	Post code
16.07.11	Rantau Bayur	500.75	38,319	41,390	42,364	Tebing Abang	21	30968
16.07.05	Betung	351.09	55,922	54,750	57,499	Betung	12 ^{(a)}	30958
16.07.16	Suak Tapeh	358.67	^{(b)}	18,960	20,506	Lubuk Lancang	11	30957
16.07.04	Pulau Rimau	496.76	38,454	21,360	25,322	Teluk Betung	17	30959
16.07.15	Tungkal Ilir	660.46	23,281	28,810	32,252	Sido Mulyo	14	30956
16.07.21	Selat Penuguan	431.75	^{(c)}	22,670	24,469	Wonodadi	12	30959
16.07.05	Banyuasin III	316.85	86,183	66,420	72,685	Pangkalan Balai	26 ^{(d)}	30953 ^{(e)}
16.07.17	Sembawa	215.46	^{(f)}	32,290	35,414	Sembawa	11	30953
16.07.10	Talang Kelapa	461.97	123,192	150,976	164,410	Sukajadi	19 ^{(g)}	30961
16.07.12	Tanjung Lago	822.60	35,687	40,460	45,425	Tanjung Lado	15	30960
16.07.01	Banyuasin I	213.92	69,860	54,380	61,610	Mariana	13 ^{(h)}	30963
16.07.19	Air Kumbang	347.99	^{(i)}	26,076	30,190	Cinta Manis Baru	16	30962
16.07.06	Rambutan	469.11	41,953	45,592	47,177	Rambutan	20 ^{(j)}	30967
16.07.07	Muara Padang	949.61	25,198	31,890	34,411	Muara Padang	15	30975
16.07.13	Muara Sugihan	724.74	36,971	38,210	42,193	Tirta Harja	22	30976
16.07.09	Makarti Jaya	328.09	32,819	25,450	25,919	Makarti Jaya	12 ^{(k)}	30972
16.07.14	Air Saleh	342.10	28,858	34,920	37,400	Saleh Mukti	14	30973
16.07.02	Banyuasin II	3,553.71	45,072	29,267	31,885	Sungsang I	10	30971
16.07.20	Karang Agung Ilir	139.59	^{(l)}	11,410	12,738	Jati Sari	7	30971
16.07.08	Muara Telang	367.42	52,783	37,580	40,758	Telang Jaya	16	30974
16.07.18	Sumber Marga Telang	205.89	^{(m)}	24,050	26,005	Muara Telang	10	30977
	Totals	12,258.59	749,107	836,914	910,632	Pangkalan Balai	313	

Notes: (a) includes 2 kelurahan (Betung and Rimba Asam).
(b) 2010 population included in figure for Betung and Banyuasin III Districts, from parts of which it was created in 2011.
(c) 2010 population included in figure for Pulau Rimau District, from part of which it was created.
(d) comprises 5 kelurahan and 21 desa. The kelurahan (with populations in 2025) are Pangkalan Balai (12,249), Kedondong Raye (9,462), Seterio (6,982), Kayuara Kuning (3,700) and Mulya Agung (2,314), while the most populous desa was Langkan (6,355).
(e) except for the villages of Pangkalan Balai (which has a postcode of 30911), Seterio (30912), Sukaraja Baru (30913), Mulya Agung (30914), Kayuara Kuning (30915) and Sukamulya (30916).
(f) 2010 population included in figure for Banyuasin III District, from part of which it was created in 2011.
(g) following re-organisation in 2022, now comprises 13 kelurahan (Sukajadi, Sukajadi Timur, Kenten, Sei Sedapat, Azhar Permai, Sukamoro, Rawamaju, Air Batu, Air Batu Jaya, Tanah Mas, Tanah Mas Indah, Talang Keramat and Keramat Jaya) and 7 desa. Of the kelurahan, Sukajadi had 18,113 inhabitants as at mid 2025, Sukamoro had 16,173, Sukajadi Timur had 15,214, Kenten had 14,964, Tanah Mas had 12,376, Air Batu had 10,074, Tanah Mas Indah had 8,369 and Talang Keramat had 4,465, while the most populous desa was Kenten Laut (with 11,054).
(h) includes 2 kelurahan (Mariana and Mariana Ilir).
(i) 2010 population included in figure for Banyuasin I and Rambutan Districts, from parts of which it was created in 2012.
(j) includes one kelurahan (Jakabaring Selatan). (k) includes one kelurahan (Makarti Jaya).
(l) 2010 population included in figure for Banyuasin II District, from part of which it was created.
(m) 2010 population included in figure for Muara Telang District, from part of which it was created in 2016.

The majority of the Regency lies within the Palembang metropolitan area, which is formally known as Patungraya Agung (an acronym of Palenbang - Betung - Indaralaya - Kayu Agung). Several of the above districts are immediately adjacent to Palembang City and contain suburbs of that city. While Banyuasin I and Banyuasin III form parts of the metropolitan area, and lie respectively to the northeast and northwest of the city (but separated by Sembawa District and Talang Kelapa District to the north of the city), the large but thinly-populated Banyuasin II District is remote from the city and forms the large northern extension of the regency, bordering on the coast.

Of the Regency's 25 kelurahan, 13 are in Talang Kelapa District, 5 in Banyuasin III District, 2 each in Betung District and Banyuasin I District, and 1 each in Rambutan District and Makarti Jaya District. Average land area of all 288 desa is 43.58 km^{2} (16.83 sq mi)
