= Musi Banyuasin Regency =

Regency in South Sumatra, Indonesia

Coordinates: 2°53′38″S 103°48′45″E

Musi Banyuasin Regency Kabupaten Musi Banyuasin
- Regency
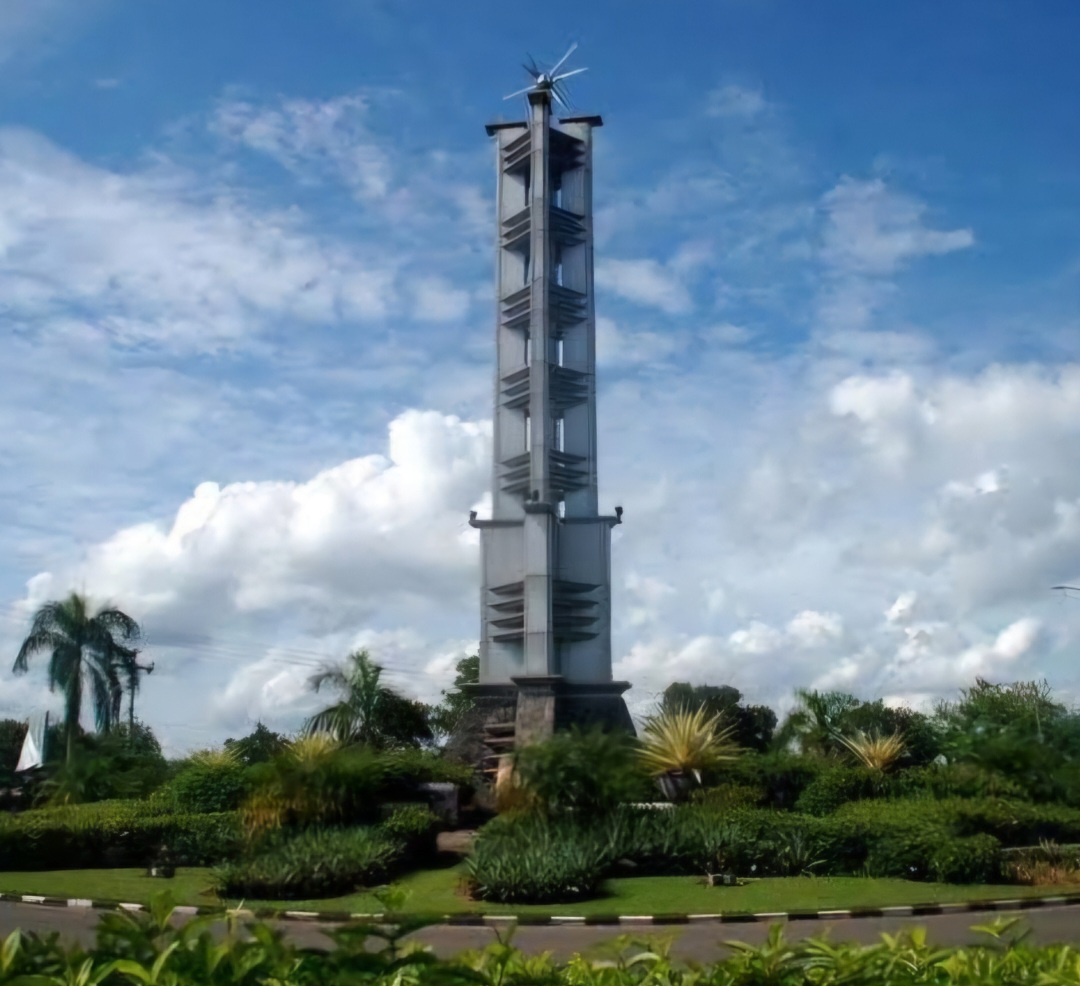
- Bintang Sekayu Monument

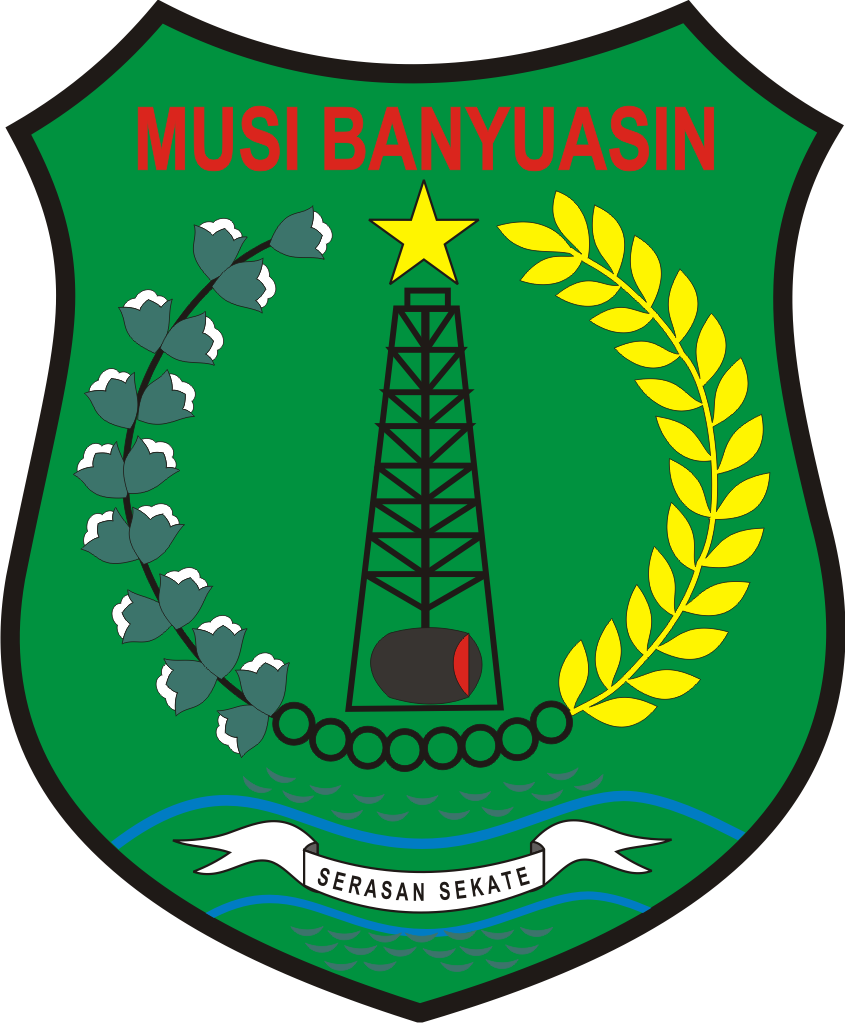
- Coat of arms
- Motto: Serasan Sekate
- Location in South Sumatra
- Country: Indonesia
- Province: South Sumatra
- Regency seat: Sekayu

Government
  - Regent: M. Toha Tohet
  - Vice Regent: Rohman

Area
  - Total: 14,265.96 km^{2} (5,508.12 sq mi)

Population (mid 2025 estimate)
  - Total: 758,223
  - Density: 53.1491/km^{2} (137.656/sq mi)
- Time zone: UTC+7 (WIB)

Musi Banyuasin Regency is a regency of South Sumatra province, in Indonesia. Originally much larger, it was reduced by about 45% of its former area on 10 April 2002 by the splitting off of most of its eastern and northeastern districts to form the new Banyuasin Regency. It now has a total area of 14,265.96 km^{2} (5,508 sq mi) and a population of 561,458 at the 2010 Census and 622,206 at the 2020 Census; the official estimate as at mid 2025 was 758,223 (comprising 389,345 males and 368,878 females).

The administrative centre of Musi Banyuasin Regency is the town of Sekayu.

== Geography ==
The regency, which covers fifteen percent of the area of South Sumatra Province, is located between 1.3° to 4° South latitude and from 103° to 104°40′ East longitude. It is bordered to the north by Jambi Province, to the south by the new Penukal Abab Lematang Ilir Regency, to the west by Musi Rawas Regency and North Musi Rawas Regency, and to the east by Banyuasin Regency.

== Administrative districts ==
As at 2010, Musi Banyuasin Regency was subdivided into eleven districts (kecamatan), but a further three districts were created in 2011 (Lawang Wetan, Babat Supat and Tungkal Jaya), and another one in 2017 (Jirak Jaya). These 15 are all listed below with their revised areas (in km^{2}) and their populations at the 2010 Census and the 2020 Census, together with the official estimates as at mid 2025. The table also includes the locations of the district administrative centres, the number of administrative villages in each district (totaling 227 rural desa and 13 urban kelurahan), and its post codes.

Kode Wilayah	Name of District (kecamatan)	Area in km^{2}	Pop'n Census 2010	Pop'n Census 2020	Pop'n Estimate mid 2025	Admin centre	No. of villages	Post code(s)
16.06.05	Sanga Desa	317.00	30,032	33,010	38,451	Ngulak	19 ^{(a)}	30759
16.06.06	Babat Toman	1,291.00	52,640	36,070	44,908	Babat	13 ^{(b)}	30752
16.06.04	Batanghari Leko	2,107.79	21,156	19,670	26,656	Tanah Abang	16	30755
16.06.10	Plakat Tinggi	247.00	22,043	26,740	31,411	Sido Rahayu	15	30758
16.06.13	Lawang Wetan	232.00	^{(c)}	25,080	30,718	Ulak Paceh	15	30753
16.06.03	Sungai Keruh	330.12	40,595	23,350	27,179	Tebing Bulang	10	30751
16.06.15	Jirak Jaya	298.88	^{(d)}	19,090	23,186	Jirak	12	30751
16.06.01	Sekayu	701.60	78,637	91,120	105,806	Serasan Jaya	14 ^{(e)}	30711
16.06.02	Lais	755.53	52,353	53,460	59,866	Lais	15	30757
16.06.07	Sungai Lilin (Lilin River)	374.26	85,745	61,820	72,529	Sungai Lilin	15 ^{(f)}	30750
16.06.08	Keluang	400.57	28,342	32,740	38,815	Keluang	14 ^{(g)}	30754
16.06.14	Babat Supat	511.02	^{(h)}	35,740	42,834	Babat Banyuasin	16	30755
16.06.09	Bayung Lencir	4,847.00	112,277	75,370	105,729	Bayung Lencir	23 ^{(i)}	30756
16.06.11	Lalan	1,031.00	37,638	39,300	47,158	Bandar Agung	27	30758
16.06.12	Tungkal Jaya	821.00	^{(j)}	49,660	62,977	Peninggalan	16	30756
	Totals	14,265.96	561,458	622,206	758,223	Sekayu	240	

Notes: (a) includes two kelurahan (Ngulak and Ngulak I). (b) includes two kelurahan (Babat and Mangun Jaya).
(c) the population of Lawang Wetan District in 2010 is included in the figure for Babat Toman District, from which it was cut in 2011.
(d) the population of Jirak Jaya District in 2010 is included in the figures for Sungai Keruh District, from which it was cut in 2017.
(e) includes four kelurahan (Balai Agung, Kayu Ara, Serasan Jaya and Soak Baru).
(f) includes 2 kelurahan (Sungai Lilin and Sungai Lilin Jaya). (g) includes one kelurahan (Keluang).
(h) the population of Babat Supat District in 2010 is included in the figure for Sungai Lilin District, from which it was cut in 2011.
(i) includes 2 kelurahan (Bayung Lencir and Bayung Lencir Indah).
(j) the population of Tungkal Jaya District in 2010 is included in the figure for Bayung Lencir District, from which it was cut in 2011.

== Soil ==
Musi Banyuasin Regency consists of 4 kinds of soil:

- Organosol: along the swamp and in the plain area
- Clay Loam: see Organosol
- Alluvial: along the Musi River
- Pudzolik: in the hilly area

== Climate ==
Musi Banyuasin Regency has tropic and wet season with variation of rainfall between 39.00 and 297.25 mm, for the year 2007 December has highest rank of rainfalls. Rain days in 2007 tend to vary between 2.75 and 15.25 days with January having highest rank of rain days.
