= List of governors of South Sumatra =

This article lists governors that have ruled the Indonesian province of South Sumatra.

No.	Photo	Governor	Took office	Left office	Vice Governor	R
1		Adnan Kapau Gani	17 May 1946	16 October 1946		
2		Mohammad Isa	16 October 1946	25 June 1948		
2		Mohammad Isa	25 June 1948	1 August 1954		
3		Winarno Danuatmodjo	1 August 1954	1957		
4		M. Husien	1957	1958		
5		Mochtar Prabu Mangkunegara	1958	1959		
6		Achmad Bastari	4 January 1960	November 1963		
—		M. Sorimuda Pohan	November 1963	1964		
—		R. Abdullah	November 1963	1964		
—		R. Sugiharto	November 1963	1964		
—		Ali Amin	November 1963	1964		
7		Abujazid Bustomi	1963	1966		
8		Ali Amin	1966	1967		
9		Asnawi Mangku Alam	10 January 1968	6 April 1973		
9		Asnawi Mangku Alam	6 April 1973	8 April 1978		
—		Asnawi Mangku Alam	8 April 1978	12 September 1978		
10		Sainan Sagiman	12 September 1978	12 September 1983		
10		Sainan Sagiman	12 September 1983	12 September 1988		
11		Ramli Hasan Basri	12 September 1988	11 September 1993		
11		Ramli Hasan Basri	11 September 1993	12 September 1998		
12		Rosihan Arsyad	12 September 1998	7 November 2003		
13		Syahrial Oesman	7 November 2003	11 July 2008		
14		Mahyuddin N. S.	11 July 2008	7 November 2008		
15		Alex Noerdin	7 November 2008	7 November 2013		
15		Alex Noerdin	7 November 2013	21 September 2018		
—		Hadi Prabowo	21 September 2018	1 October 2018		
16		Herman Deru	1 October 2018	1 October 2023		

== Bibliography ==
- Government of South Sumatra (1996), Sejarah perkembangan pemerintahan di daerah Sumatera Selatan
- Anugrah, Sapta; Pramasto, Arafah (2017), drg. M. Isa dalam Perjuangan Kemerdekaan Sumatera Selatan
- Ministry of Information (1954), Kami Perkenalkan [We Introduce] (PDF) (in Indonesian), Jakarta: Archipel Printers & Editors
