= List of incumbent regional heads and deputy regional heads in South Sumatra =

The following is an article about the list of Regional Heads and Deputy Regional Heads in 17 regencies/cities in South Sumatra who are currently still serving.

== List ==
Regency/ City	Photo of the Regent/ Mayor	Regent/ Mayor	Photo of Deputy Regent/ Mayor	Deputy Regent/ Mayor	Taking Office	End of Office (Planned)	Ref.
Banyuasin; Regency List of Regents/Deputy Regents		Askolani Jasi		Netta Indian	20 February 2025	20 February 2030	
Empat Lawang; Regency List of Regents/Deputy Regents	pus	Joncik Muhammad	pus	Arifa'i	16 June 2025	16 June 2030	
Lahat; Regency List of Regents/Deputy Regents	pus	Bursah Zarnubi	pus	Widia Ningsih	20 February 2025	20 February 2030	
Muara Enim; Regency List of Regents/Deputy Regents	pus	Sumarni (Acting Officer)			10 June 2026	20 February 2030	
Musi Banyuasin; Regency List of Regents/Deputy Regents	pus	M. Toha Tohet	pus	Rohman	20 February 2025	20 February 2030	
Musi Rawas; Regency List of Regents/Deputy Regents	pus	Ratna Machmud	pus	Suprayitno	20 February 2025	20 February 2030	
North Musi Rawas; Regency List of Regents/Deputy Regents	pus	Devi Suhartoni	pus	Junius Wahyudi	20 February 2025	20 February 2030	
Ogan Ilir; Regency List of Regents/Deputy Regents	pus	Panca Wijaya Akbar	pus	Ardani	20 February 2025	20 February 2030	
Ogan Komering Ilir; Regency List of Regents/Deputy Regents	pus	Muchendi Mahzareki	pus	Supriyanto	20 February 2025	20 February 2030	
Ogan Komering Ulu; Regency List of Regents/Deputy Regents	pus	Teddy Meilwansyah	pus	Marjito Bachri	20 February 2025	20 February 2030	
South Ogan Komering Ulu; Regency List of Regents/Deputy Regents	pus	Abusama	pus	Misnadi	20 February 2025	20 February 2030	
East Ogan Komering Ulu; Regency List of Regents/Deputy Regents	pus	Lanosin Hamzah	pus	Adi Nugraha Purna Yudha	20 February 2025	20 February 2030	
Penukal Abab Lematang Ilir; Regency List of Regents/Deputy Regents	pus	Asgianto	pus	Iwan Tuaji	20 February 2025	20 February 2030	
Lubuk Linggau; City List of Mayors/Deputy mayors	pus	Rachmat Hidayat	pus	Rustam Effendi	20 February 2025	20 February 2030	
Pagar Alam; City List of Mayors/Deputy mayors	pus	Ludi Oliansyah	pus	Bertha Edhar	20 February 2025	20 February 2030	
Palembang; City List of Mayors/Deputy mayors	pus	Ratu Dewa	pus	Prima Salam	20 February 2025	20 February 2030	
Prabumulih; City List of Mayors/Deputy mayors	pus	Arlan	pus	Franky Nasril	20 February 2025	20 February 2030	

Notes

- "Commencement of office" is the inauguration date at the beginning or during the current term of office. For acting regents/mayors, it is the date of appointment or extension as acting regent/mayor.
- Based on the Constitutional Court decision Number 27/PUU-XXII/2024, the Governor and Deputy Governor, Regent and Deputy Regent, and Mayor and Deputy Mayor elected in 2020 shall serve until the inauguration of the Governor and Deputy Governor, Regent and Deputy Regent, and Mayor and Deputy Mayor elected in the 2024 national simultaneous elections as long as the term of office does not exceed 5 (five) years.

== See also ==
- South Sumatra
