= Mayor of Palembang =

Political post in Indonesia

- Wali Kota Palembang
- Coat of arms of Palembang

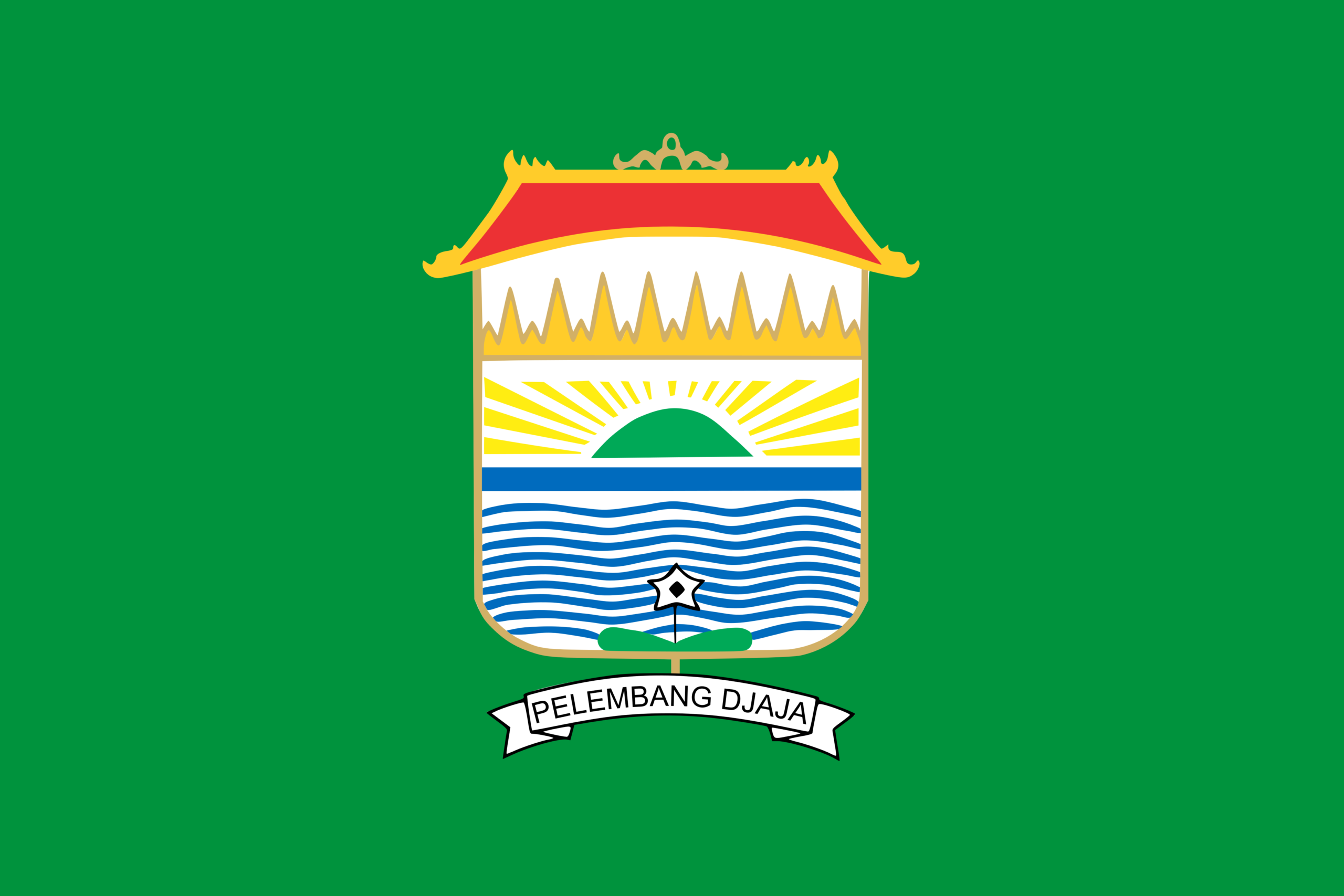
- 120px

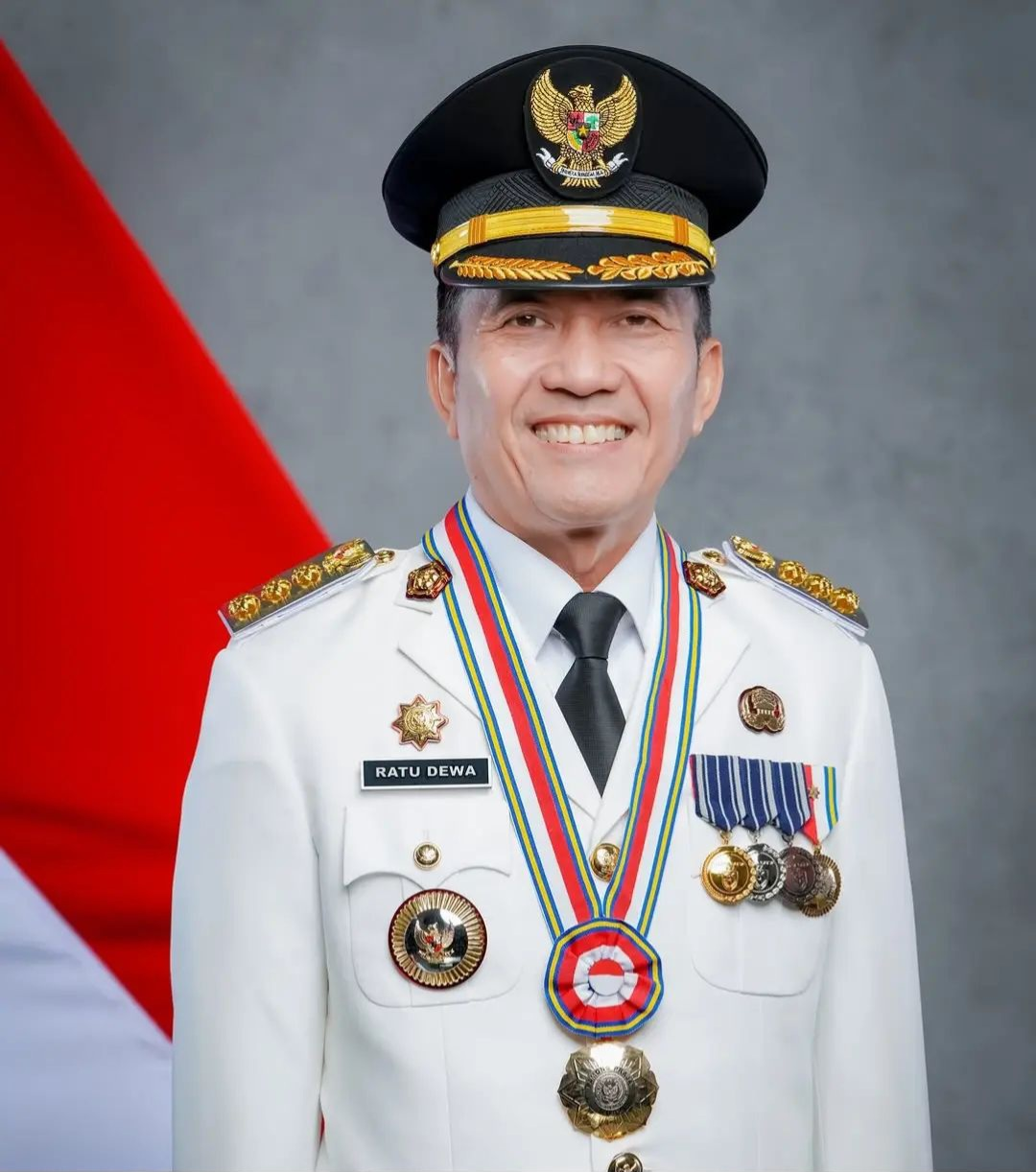
- Incumbent; Ratu Dewa since 20 February 2025
- Term length: 5 years
- Inaugural holder: Pieter Egbert Eduard Johan le Cocq d'Armandville (Dutch East Indies, 1920); Raden Hanan (Indonesia, 1945)
- Formation: 1920; 106 years ago
- Website: Official website

Palembang, the capital of South Sumatra province , has a leadership structure that begins with the mayor. In 1920, the position of assistant resident, who previously led the Palembang government, was finally changed to mayor. The first mayor was Pieter Egbert Eduard Johan le Cocq d'Armandville, a Dutch descendant . Initially, a mayor could also serve as chairman of the city council, assisted by an assistant mayor elected by popular vote.

== List ==
The following is a definitive list of Mayors of Palembang since 1920 during the Dutch East Indies era until now under the Government of the Republic of Indonesia.

Burgemeester van Palembang
Num.	Mayor (Birth–Death)	Portrait	Party	Beginning	End	Term of office	Period	Vice Mayor	Ref.
1	Pieter Egbert d'Armandville (?–)		Non Party	1920	1929	8–9 years	1	N/A	
2	Richard Carl van Lissa (?–)		Non Party	1929	2 Februari 1932	2–3 years	2	N/A	
3	Frits Coenraad van Lier (1882–1933)		Non Party	2 Februari 1932	17 December 1932	319 days	3	N/A	
(2)	Richard Carl van Lissa (?–)		Non Party	17 December 1932	1934	1–2 years	2	N/A	
4	Frederik Hendrik van de Wetering (?–)		Non Party	1934	1938	3–4 years	4	N/A	
5	L. van Dijk (?–)		Non Party	1938	1941	2–3 years	5	N/A	
6	P. H. M. Hildebrand (?–)		Non Party	1941	1942	0–1 years	6	N/A	
Mayor of Palembang
Num.	Mayor (Birth–Death)	Portrait	Party	Beginning	End	Term of office	Period	Vice Mayor	Ref.
1	Raden Hanan (1898–1979)		PIR	1945	1947	1–2 years	6	N/A	
2	Sudarman Ganda Subrata (?–)		Non Party	1950	1954	3–4 years	7	N/A	
3	Muhammad Ali Amin (1915–2012)		Non Party	1955	1960	4–5 years	8	N/A	
4	Abdullah Kadir (?–)		ABRI–Polri	1962	1968	5–6 years	9	N/A	
5	Muhammad Rasyad Nawawi (?–)		Non Party	1968	1970	1–2 years	10	N/A	
6	RHA. A. Rifai Tjek Yan (?–)		Non Party	1970	1978	7–8 years	11	N/A	
7	A. Dahlan (?–)		Non Party	1978	1983	4–5 years	12	N/A	
8	Kholil Aziz (?–)		Non Party	1983	1988	9–10 years	13	N/A	
8	Kholil Aziz (?–)		Non Party	1988	1993	4–5 years	14	N/A	
9	Husni (1936–2022)		Non Party	1993	2003	9–10 years	15	N/A	
9	Husni (1936–2022)		Non Party	1993	2003	9–10 years	16	N/A	
10	Eddy Santana Putra (born 1957)		PDI-P	2003	2008	4–5 years	17	Tolhah Hasan	
10	Eddy Santana Putra (born 1957)		PDI-P	21 July 2008	21 July 2013	5 years, 0 days	18 (2008)	Romi Herton	
11	Romi Herton (1965–2017)		PDI-P	21 July 2013	9 December 2014	1 year, 141 days	19 (2013)	Harnojoyo	
12	Harnojoyo (born 1967)		Demokrat	10 September 2015	21 July 2018	2 years, 314 days	19 (2013)	Fitrianti Agustinda 2016-2023	
12	Harnojoyo (born 1967)		Demokrat	18 September 2018	18 September 2023	5 years, 0 days	20 (2018)	Fitrianti Agustinda 2016-2023	
13	Ratu Dewa (born 1969)		Golkar	20 February 2025	Incumbent	1 year, 199 days	21 (2024)	Prima Salam	

== Temporary replacement ==
In the government stack, a regional head who submits himself to leave or temporarily resigns from his position to the central government, then the Minister of Home Affairs prepares a replacement who is a bureaucrat in the regional government or even a vice mayor, including when the mayor's position is in a transition period.

Portrait	Mayor	Party	Beginning	End	Duration	Period	Definitive	Ref.
	Baay Salim (?–) (Temporary office)	Non Party	16 March 1950	1950	0 years	–	Transition (1950)	
	R. A. Abusamah (?–) (Temporary office)	Non Party	1950	1954	3–4 years	7	Sudarman Ganda Subrata	
	Mgs H. A. Rachman (?–) (Temporary office)	Non Party	1960	1962	1–2 years	8	M. Ali Hamin	
	Harnojoyo (born 1967) (Acting Officer)	Demokrat	9 December 2014	10 September 2015	275 days	19 (2013)	Romi Herton	
	Harobin Mustofa (?–) (Daily executor)	Non Party	21 July 2018	6 August 2018	16 days	19 (2013)	Harnojoyo	
	Akhmad Najib (?–) (Acting)	Non Party	6 August 2018	18 September 2018	43 days	–	Transition (2018)	
	Ratu Dewa (born 1969) (Acting)	Non Party	18 September 2023	19 June 2024	275 days	–	Transition (2023-2023)	(Note: Ratu Dewa resigned due to participating in the 2024 Palembang mayoral election.)
	Ucok Abdul Rauf Damenta (?–) (Acting)	Non Party	19 June 2024	29 November 2024	133 days	–	Transition (2024)	
	Cheka Virgowansyah (born 1979) (Acting)	Non Party	29 November 2024	20 February 2025	83 days	–	Transition (2024-2025)	

== See also ==
- Palembang
- List of incumbent regional heads and deputy regional heads in South Sumatra
