= Ridho Yahya =

Indonesian politician (born 1962)

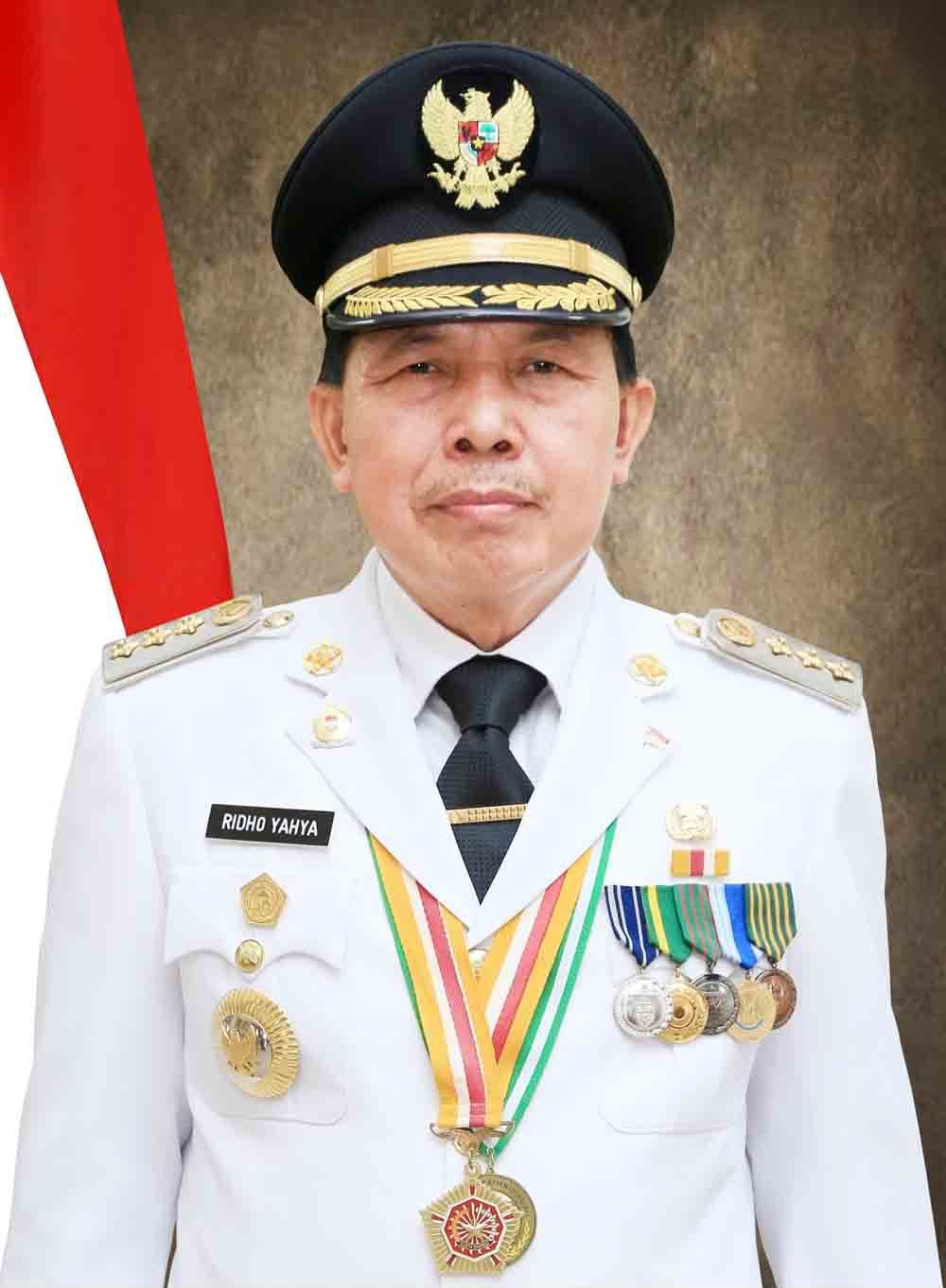

2nd Mayor of Prabumulih
- In office 18 September 2018 – 18 September 2023
- In office 14 May 2013 – 14 May 2018
- Preceded by: Rachman Djalili
- Succeeded by: Elman (act.); Arlan

Personal details
- Born: 3 January 1962 (age 63) Ogan Ilir, South Sumatra, Indonesia
- Political party: Golkar

Ridho Yahya (born 3 January 1962) is an Indonesian politician of the Golkar party. He served two terms of the mayor of Prabumulih, South Sumatra between 2013 and 2023.

== Early life ==
Ridho Yahya was born on 3 January 1962 in the village of Sukaraja, within Ogan Ilir Regency of South Sumatra. He is a graduate of the Bogor Agricultural Institute.

== Career ==
In 2008, Yahya ran in Prabumulih's mayoral election as a vice-mayoral candidate of Rachman Djalili, and was elected with 36.5 percent of votes. Yahya would run as a mayoral candidate in 2013 with Andriansyah Fikri, also a vice-mayoral candidate in 2008, and they were elected with 40.65 percent of votes.

As mayor, Yahya began a pilot program to connect Prabumulih's households to a municipal piped gas network, which by 2019 had reached 86 percent of households in the city. He also organized funds collection from municipal civil servants to fund the renovation of shabby homes in the city without using the city's budget, and promoted products such as pineapple fiber from the city's pineapple processing industry. Yahya and Fikri were reelected in 2018 in an uncontested election, winning 79 percent of votes against the blank box option. During the 2018 local election, he received a warning letter from his party Golkar for opposing the candidacy of the party's candidate in South Sumatra's gubernatorial election.

Yahya opposed the construction of the Palembang–Indralaya Toll Road, citing its negative impact on small businesses especially in Prabumulih. He remarked that the toll road will divert traffic heading to Ogan Komering Ulu Regency away from the city. After the end of his tenure as mayor on 18 September 2023, he considered running in South Sumatra's 2024 gubernatorial election, but ultimately did not run. He also opposed coal mining activities within the city, which led him to receive a Kalpataru Award in 2015.

== Personal life ==
He is married to Suryanti Ngesti Rahayu. Yahya and Rahayu's daughter along with Rahayu herself registered to run in Prabumulih's 2024 mayoral election, with Rahayu eventually becoming PDI-P's candidate. She was defeated by Arlan in the election. Ridho's older brother, Mawardi Yahya, served as Vice Governor of South Sumatra from 2018 to 2023.
