= Rachman Djalili =

Indonesian politician (1948–2022)

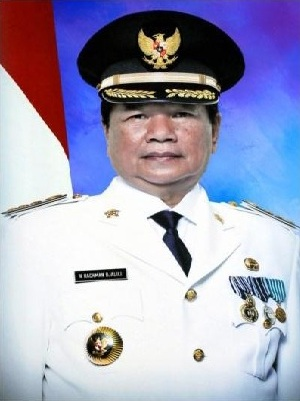

1st Mayor of Prabumulih
- In office 13 May 2003 – 13 May 2013
- Preceded by: Sudjadi (act.)
- Succeeded by: Ridho Yahya

Member of South Sumatra DPRD
- In office 25 September 2014 – 25 September 2019

Personal details
- Born: 7 August 1948 Muara Enim, South Sumatra, Indonesia
- Died: 2 July 2022 (aged 73) Palembang, South Sumatra, Indonesia

Rachman Djalili (7 August 1948 – 2 July 2022) was an Indonesian politician. He was the first mayor of Prabumulih, serving from 2003 to 2013, and later served a term in South Sumatra's Regional House of Representatives from 2014 to 2019.

== Biography ==
Djalili was born on 7 August 1948 at the village of Tambangan Kelekar, in Muara Enim Regency of South Sumatra.

=== Prabumulih ===
The city of Prabumulih was split off from Muara Enim Regency in 2001, with Sudjiadi as acting mayor. Following a vote by the new Regional House of Representatives (DPRD), Djalili was elected mayor and was sworn in on 13 May 2003 with Yuri Gagarin as his vice mayor.

In 2003, the city government acquired some land for the construction of new offices and a hospital. Djalili then was head of a committee for the land procurement, and in 2006 he was made a suspect in a corruption investigation related to this land purchase. He was accused of having caused state losses amounting to Rp 3.39 billion by marking up the land price. This investigation led to Djalili being deactivated as mayor. On two occasions, he was ordered to be arrested, but he fainted on both occasions and the arrests were shelved. Djalili was acquitted by the Muara Enim District Court on 22 November 2006.

Djalili was elected for a second term in the city's 2008 mayoral election, with Ridho Yahya as his running mate after winning 36.53 percent of votes. Nearing the end of his second term, Djalili ran as the vice-regent candidate of Asri AG in Muara Enim's 2013 regency election, but the pair was defeated.

=== Later politics ===
After his tenure as mayor, Djalili ran and was elected as a PDI-P candidate for South Sumatra DPRD in the 2014 Indonesian legislative election from the 6th district (Prabumulih and Muara Enim). He ran again from the same district in 2019, but failed to win a second term.

== Personal life ==
He was married to Herawati, who was elected into Prabumulih's DPRD in the 2014–2019 term (as a PDI-P member) and in 2024–2029 (as a Golkar member). One of their children, Aditya Askari, unsuccessfully ran for a seat in Prabumulih's DPRD in the 2024 election.

Djalili died on 2 July 2022 at the M Hoesin Hospital in Palembang while receiving treatment for an illness. He was buried later that day in the Kebun Bunga public cemetery in Palembang.
