= Eddy Santana Putra =

Indonesian politician (born 1957)

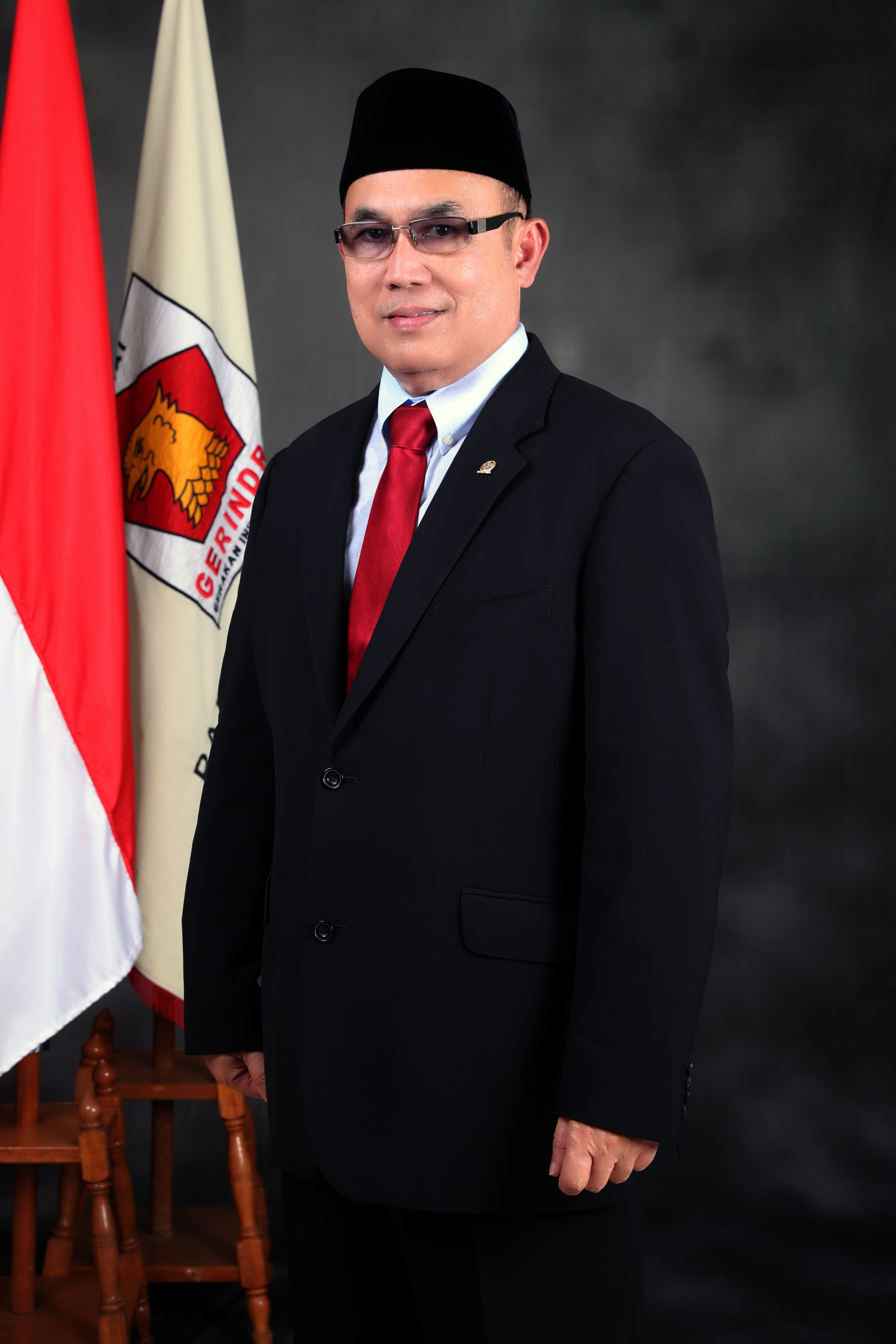

Member of People's Representative Council
- In office 1 October 2019 – 1 October 2024
- Constituency: South Sumatra I

15th Mayor of Palembang
- In office 21 July 2003 – 21 July 2013
- Preceded by: Husni
- Succeeded by: Romi Herton

Personal details
- Born: 20 January 1957 (age 68); Pangkal Pinang, South Sumatra, Indonesia
- Political party: Gerindra (since 2018); PDI-P (until 2018)

Eddy Santana Putra (born 20 January 1957) is an Indonesian politician who served as a member of the House of Representatives from 2019 to 2024, and was the mayor of Palembang between 2003 and 2013. He was a member of PDI-P until 2018, when he moved to Gerindra. Originating from Pangkal Pinang, he was elected as mayor of Palembang through both a city council vote and direct popular vote.

== Background ==
Eddy Santana Putra was born in Pangkal Pinang, South Sumatra (today Bangka Belitung Islands) on 20 January 1957. After completing high school at Xaverius 1 High School, he went to Sriwijaya University, from which he earned a bachelors of civil engineering and a masters of engineering.

== Career ==
Before entering politics, Eddy was a civil servant at South Sumatra provincial government's public works department.

=== Mayor ===
Eddy first became the mayor of Palembang following a vote by the city council in 2003. In Palembang's first direct mayoral election in 2008, Eddy ran for a second term with PDI-P's support and Romi Herton as his running mate, winning with 335,591 votes (51%).

In addition, he ran as a candidate for PDI-P's provincial leadership in the party's 2005 South Sumatra congress, despite then being a member of Golkar. He eventually served two terms in that position.

During his tenure as mayor, he established the Trans Musi, a bus rapid transit system operating in the city. ASEAN gave the city a "Clean Land for Big Cities" recognition during its 2nd Environmentally Sustainable Cities Award in November 2011.

His second term expired on 21 July 2013, and he was succeeded by Romi Herton. He ran for governorship of South Sumatra in the 2013 gubernatorial election, but placed third behind incumbent governor Alex Noerdin and East Ogan Komering Ulu regent Herman Deru.

=== Post-mayorship ===
In the 2018 mayoral election for Palembang, Eddy opposed the incumbent candidate Harnojoyo against his party PDI-P's position. He later quit the party and joined Gerindra, running in the 2019 legislative election as a People's Representative Council candidate from South Sumatra's 1st electoral district. He won 64,397 votes - the most in the district - and secured a seat. He ran for a second term in the 2024 election but was not reelected. He ran in South Sumatra's gubernatorial election in 2024, but was defeated by Herman Deru.

== Personal life ==
He was married to Srimaya Hariyanti until 2011, when divorce proceedings were filed and the case was brought up to the Supreme Court of Indonesia. Eddy later remarried Eva Ajeng, a model. Eddy and Srimaya had two children.
