= Syahrial Oesman =

Indonesian politician (born 1955)

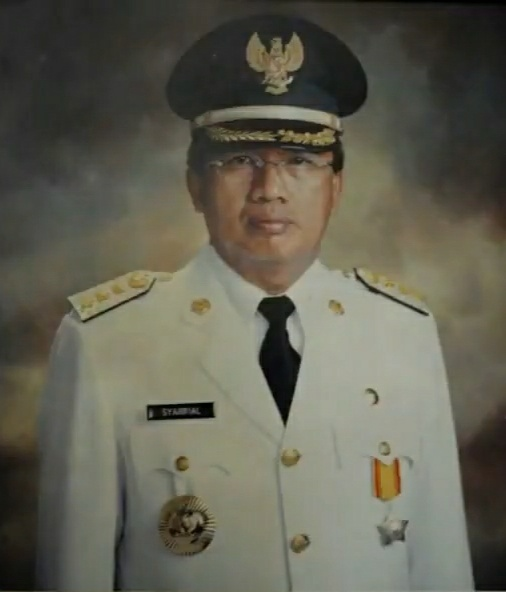

Governor of South Sumatra
- In office 7 November 2003 – 19 June 2008
- Preceded by: Rosihan Arsyad
- Succeeded by: Mahyuddin N. S.

Regent of Ogam Komering Ulu
- In office 2000–2003
- Preceded by: Amiruddin Ibrahim
- Succeeded by: Eddy Yusuf

Personal details
- Born: 25 May 1955 (age 71)
- Party: NasDem Party

Syahrial Oesman (born 25 May 1955) is an Indonesian politician currently of the NasDem Party who served as the governor of South Sumatra between 2003 and 2008 and previously as regent of Ogan Komering Ulu Regency between 2000 and 2003. After his gubernatorial term ended, he was convicted of bribery and was imprisoned for three years.

== Early life and education ==
Oesman was born on 25 May 1955. His father left the family when Oesman was a child, and he was raised by his mother Zaleha Oesman. Oesman later enrolled at Sriwijaya University, studying engineering.

== Career ==
After his graduation, Oesman began to work as a civil servant. He began to participate in politics following the fall of Suharto, defeating Herman Deru by just one vote at the local legislature's vote and becoming elected as regent of Ogan Komering Ulu Regency in 1999. Prior to the expiration of his term there, he ran as governor of South Sumatra in 2003, again defeating the incumbent Rosihan Arsyad, again with a single vote's margin. He was a member of Golkar until 2004, when he moved to PDI-P.

As governor, Oesman promoted investment in the energy sector, attracting investors to the province. He was the first governor to establish direct transfers from the regional budget to villages, and he also lobbied the national government to develop the Port of Tanjung Api-Api, designed as an international seaport. However, he was defeated by Alex Noerdin in the 2008 gubernatorial election. He had resigned early from his gubernatorial post, on 19 June 2008, for this reelection bid. In 2009, he was convicted of bribery related to land acquisition for Tanjung Api-Api's development, and was sentenced to one year's imprisonment by Jakarta's Corruption Court. Upon appeal to the Supreme Court of Indonesia, Syahrial's sentence was increased to three years.

Following his release, Oesman became a member of the NasDem Party and became its provincial chairman in South Sumatra. He declared his intent to run again for the position of governor in the 2018 gubernatorial election, but withdrew his bid in favor of Herman Deru.
