= 2024 Palembang mayoral election =

- 27 November 2024
- Turnout: 64.08%
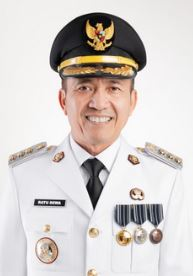

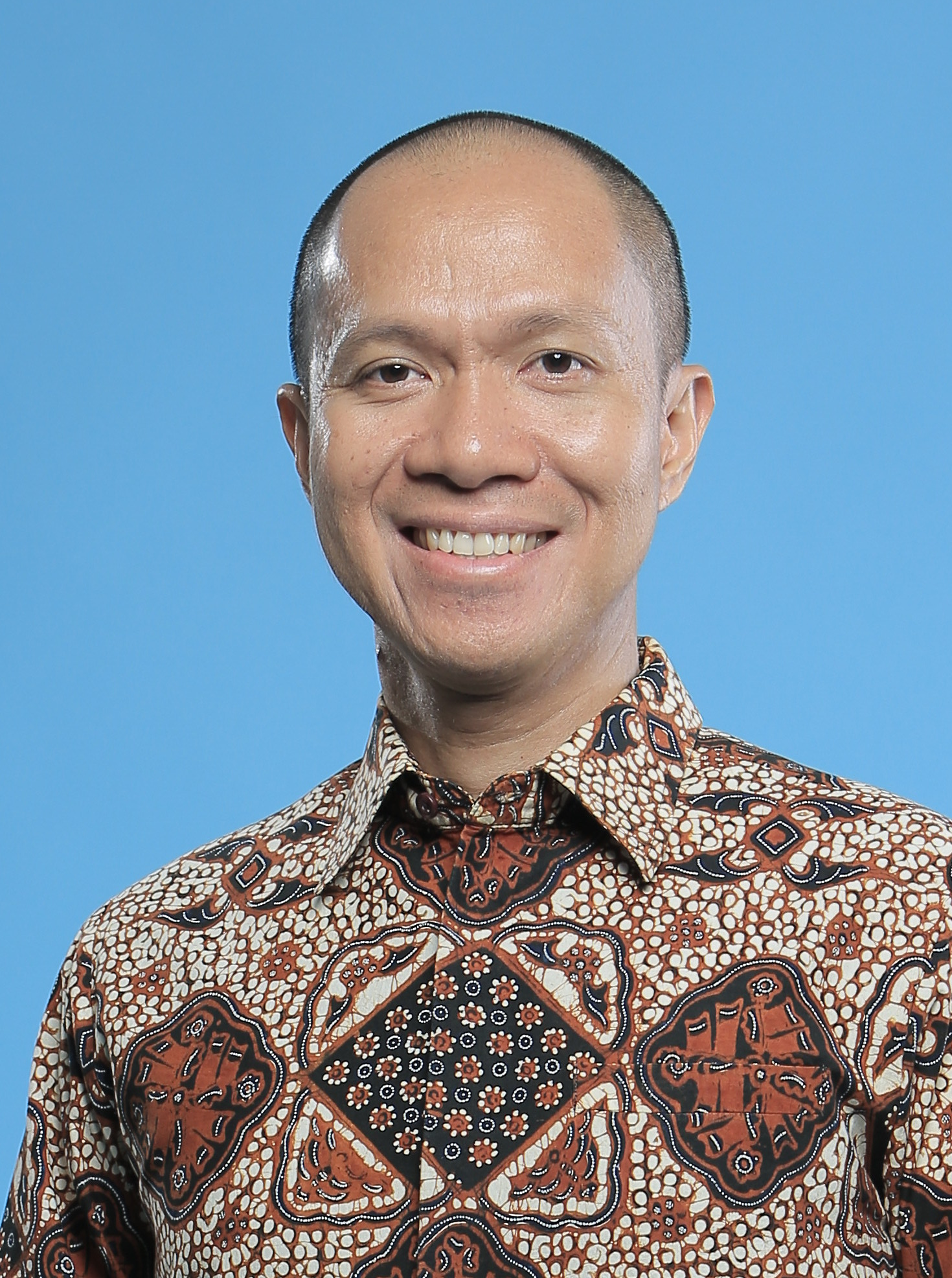

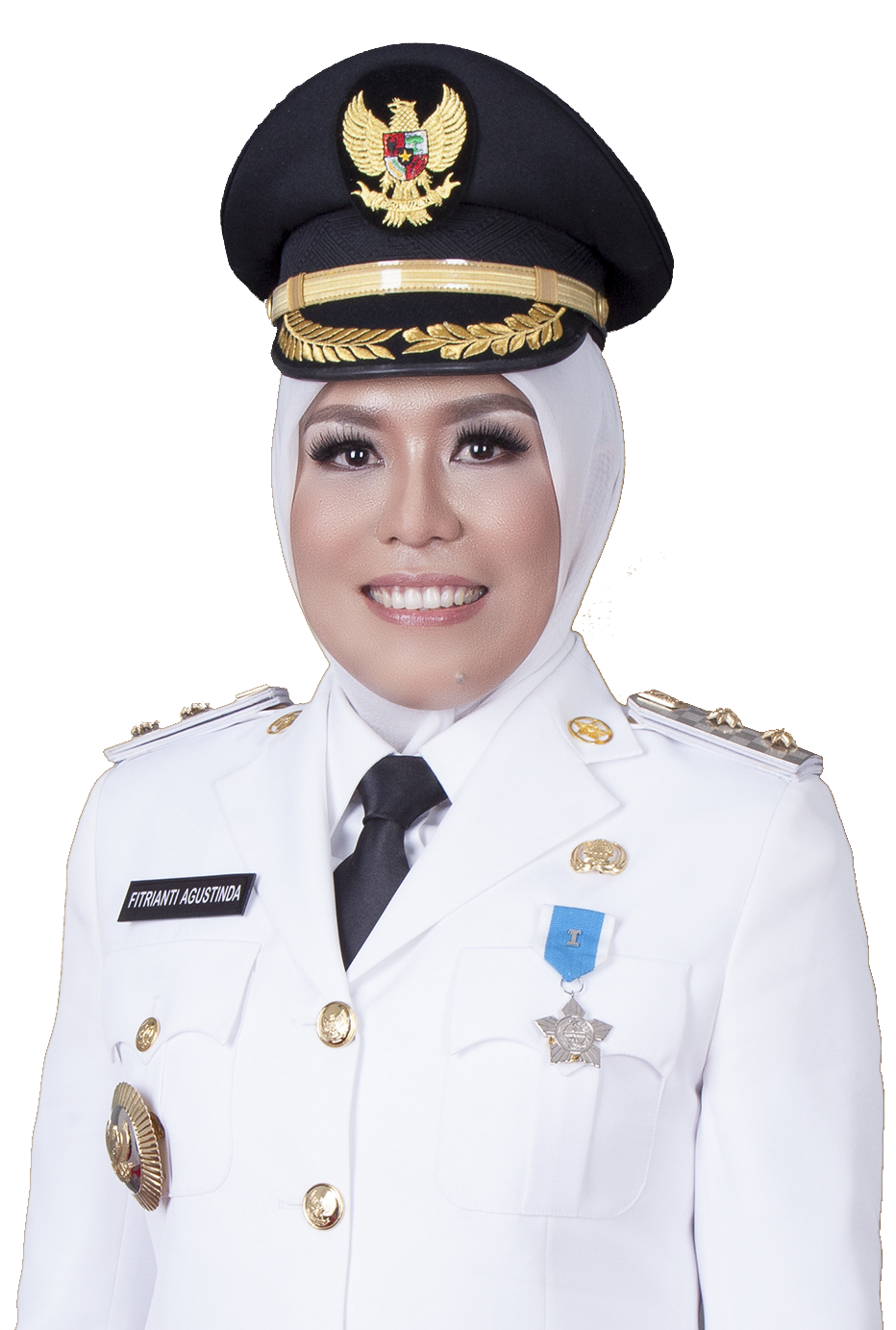
Candidate	Ratu Dewa	Yudha Pratomo	Fitrianti Agustinda
Party	Gerindra	Demokrat	NasDem
Running mate	Prima Salam	Baharudin	Nandriani Octarina
Popular vote	352,696	229,895	175,495
Percentage	46.52%	30.33%	23.15%
- Results by district and subdistrict (Interactive version)
Mayor before election
Cheka Virgowansyah (acting)
Independent
Elected mayor
Ratu Dewa
Gerindra

Mayoral elections were held in Palembang on 27 November 2024 as part of nationwide local elections to elect the mayor and vice mayor for a five-year term. The previous election was held in 2018. Ratu Dewa, a former acting mayor, won the election with 46% of the vote. Yudha Pratomo placed second with 30%, followed by former Vice Mayor Fitrianti Agustinda of the NasDem Party, who received 23%.

== Electoral system ==
The election, like other local elections in 2024, follow the first-past-the-post system where the candidate with the most votes wins the election, even if they do not win a majority. It is possible for a candidate to run uncontested, in which case the candidate is still required to win a majority of votes "against" an "empty box" option. Should the candidate fail to do so, the election will be repeated on a later date.

== Candidates ==
According to electoral regulations, in order to qualify for the election, candidates were required to secure support from a political party or a coalition of parties controlling 10 seats in the Palembang City Regional House of Representatives (DPRD). As no parties won 10 seats or more in the 2024 legislative election, parties are required to form coalitions to nominate a candidate. Candidates may alternatively demonstrate support in form of photocopies of identity cards, which in Palembang's case corresponds to 79,661 copies. Three pairs of candidates registered to the General Elections Commission through this process, although none managed to submit sufficient proofs of support before the provided deadline.

The previous mayor, Harnojoyo, had served two terms and was therefore ineligible to run in the mayoral election.

=== Potential ===
The following are individuals who have either been publicly mentioned as a potential candidate by a political party in the DPRD, publicly declared their candidacy with press coverage, or considered as a potential candidate by media outlets:

- Ratu Dewa, former acting mayor.
- Fitrianti Agustinda (NasDem), former vice mayor of Palembang and chairman of NasDem's Palembang branch.
- Akbar Alfaro (Gerindra), chair of Gerindra's parliamentary group in Palembang DPRD.
- Rasyid Rajasa (PAN), son of senior PAN politician Hatta Rajasa.

== Political map ==
Following the 2024 Indonesian legislative election, nine political parties are represented in the Palembang DPRD:

Political parties	Seat count
NasDem Party	9 / 50
Party of Functional Groups (Golkar)	8 / 50
Great Indonesia Movement Party (Gerindra)	8 / 50
Democratic Party (Demokrat)	6 / 50
Indonesian Democratic Party of Struggle (PDI-P)	5 / 50
National Mandate Party (PAN)	5 / 50
Prosperous Justice Party (PKS)	5 / 50
National Awakening Party (PKB)	4 / 50

== Results ==
Candidate	Running mate	Party	Votes	%
Ratu Dewa	Prima Salam	Gerindra Party	352,696	46.52
Yudha Pratomo	Baharudin	Democratic Party	229,895	30.33
Fitrianti Agustinda	Nandriani Octarina	NasDem Party	175,495	23.15
Total			758,086	100.00
Valid votes			758,086	95.31
Invalid/blank votes			37,278	4.69
Total votes			795,364	100.00
Registered voters/turnout			1,241,196	64.08
Source: KPU

Candidate vote share by district and subdistrict
Fitrianti–Nandriani

Ratu Dewa–Prima

Yudha–Baharudin
