= Eddy Yusuf =

Indonesian politician (1955–2022)

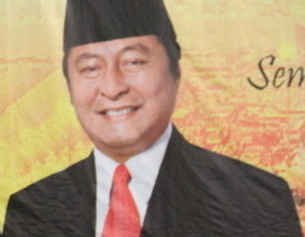

Deputy Governor of South Sumatra
- In office 7 November 2008 – 7 November 2013
- Preceded by: Mahyuddin N. S.
- Succeeded by: Ishak Mekki

Regent of Ogan Komering Ulu
- In office 2003–2008
- Preceded by: Syahrial Oesman
- Succeeded by: Yulius Nawawi

Deputy Regent of Ogan Komering Ulu
- In office 2000–2003
- Preceded by: position established
- Succeeded by: Yulius Nawawi

Personal details
- Born: 4 December 1955 Baturaja, South Sumatra, Indonesia
- Died: 8 March 2022 (aged 66) Baturaja, South Sumatra, Indonesia
- Party: Democratic Party (until 2013); People's Conscience Party (since 2013)
- Education: Sriwijaya University

Eddy Yusuf (4 December 1955 – 8 March 2022) was an Indonesian politician. A member of the Democratic Party and later the People's Conscience Party, he served as Deputy Governor of South Sumatra from 2008 to 2013 and Regent of Ogan Komering Ulu from 2003 to 2008. He died in Baturaja on 8 March 2022, at the age of 66.
