= 2018 South Sumatra gubernatorial election =

2018 Elections in Sumatra

← 2013	27 June 2018	2024 →
- Turnout: 69.2%
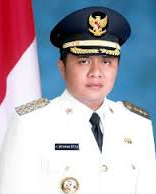

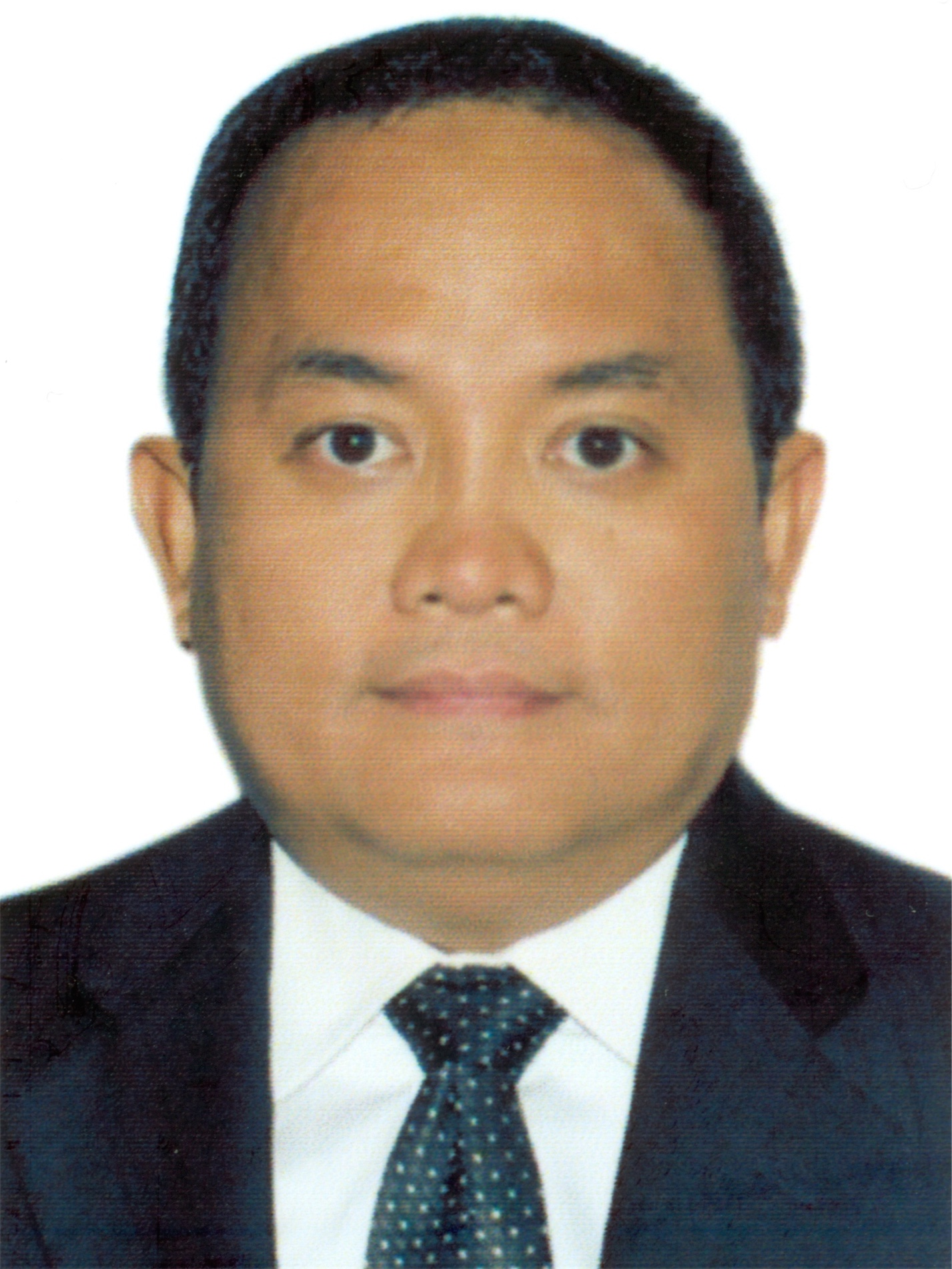

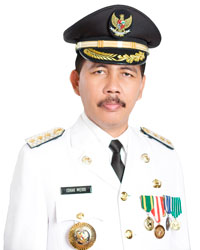

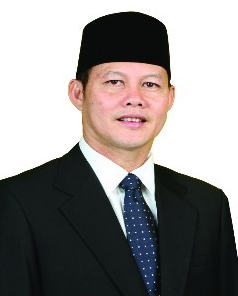
Nominee	Herman Deru	Dodi Reza Alex Noerdin
Party	NasDem	Golkar
Running mate	Mawardi Yahya	Giri Ramanda Kiemas
Popular vote	1,394,438	1,200,625
Percentage	35.96%	30.96%
Nominee	Ishak Mekki	Aswari Rivai
Party	Demokrat	Gerindra
Running mate	Yudha Pratomo	Muhammad Irwansyah
Popular vote	839,743	442,820
Percentage	21.66%	11.42%
- Results map by city and regency
Governor before election
Alex Noerdin
Golkar
Elected Governor
Herman Deru
NasDem

The 2018 South Sumatra gubernatorial election took place on 27 June 2018 as part of the simultaneous local elections. It was held to elect the governor of South Sumatra along with their deputy, whilst members of the provincial council (Dewan Perwakilan Rakyat Daerah) was re-elected in 2019.

Incumbent governor Alex Noerdin was barred from participating due to constitutional term limits. Four pairs of candidates contested the election, including incumbent vice governor Ishak Mekki. Other candidates are regents of regencies within the province: Herman Deru from East Ogan Komering Ulu, Aswari Rivai from Lahat and Dodi Reza Alex Noerdin from Musi Banyuasin.

Herman Deru would proceed to win the election, winning around 36 percent of the votes, ahead of Noerdin who placed second with 31 percent.

== Timeline ==
Registration for party-backed candidates were opened between 8 and 10 January 2018, while independent candidates were required to register between 22 and 26 November 2017. The candidates were assigned their ballot numbers on 13 February 2018. The campaigning period would commence between 15 February and 24 June, with a three-day election silence before voting on 27 June.

== Candidates ==
Under regulations, candidates are required to secure the support of a political party or a coalition thereof comprising at least 20 percent of the seats in the regional house. Alternatively, independent candidates may run provided they are capable of securing support from 7.5 percent of the total voter population (~503 thousand voters) in form of photocopied ID cards subject to verification by the local committee although no candidates expressing interest managed to do this.

#	Candidate	Position	Running mate	Parties
1	Herman Deru	Regent of East Ogan Komering Ulu	Mawardi Yahya	PAN; Nasdem; Hanura; Total: 16 seats
2	Aswari Rivai	Regent of Lahat	Muhammad Irwansyah	Gerindra; PKS; Total: 15 seats
3	Ishak Mekki	Incumbent vice governor	Yudha Pratomo	Demokrat; PKB; PPP; Total: 19 seats
4	Dodi Reza Alex Noerdin	Regent of Musi Banyuasin	Giri Ramanda Kiemas	PDI-P; Golkar; Total: 23 seats

Herman Deru, who served as the regent of East Ogan Komering Ulu Regency for two terms between 2005 and 2015, ran with fellow two-term regent of Ogan Ilir Regency Mawardi Yahya as his running mate. The ticket secured support from PAN (6 seats), Nasdem (5) and Hanura (5), totaling 16 seats in the provincial council.

Aswari Rivai, who was the leader of South Sumatra's Gerindra and also two-term regent of Lahat Regency, paired up with 2013-2018 mayor of Pangkal Pinang Muhammad Irwansyah. The pair had support from Gerindra (10 seats) and PKS (5 seats).

Ishak Mekki, in addition to being the incumbent vice governor, was another former two-term regent contesting the gubernatorial election, having governed as the regent of Ogan Komering Ilir between 2004 and 2013. He had also served as the leader of South Sumatra's Demokrat. His running mate Yudha Pratomo was an academician. The ticket was supported by Demokrat (11 seats), PPP (2 seats) and PKB (6 seats).

Dodi Reza Alex Noerdin, was the son of incumbent Alex Noerdin and also regent of Musi Banyuasin since 2017 in addition to being a former member of the People's Representative Council between 2009 and 2016. He also served as deputy secretary general in Golkar. His running mate Giri Ramanda Kiemas is the nephew of the late PDI-P figure Taufiq Kiemas, who was also leader of the South Sumatra PDI-P. Golkar and PDI-P had 10 and 13 seats in the provincial assembly, respectively, for a total of 23.

== Polling ==
=== After nominations ===
Pollster	Date	Sample size	Herman-Yahya	Rivai-Irwansyah	Ishak-Yudha	Noerdin-Kiemas
Puskaptis	6–12 June 2018	1200	30.06	5.20	15.25	36.25
LSI	1–5 June 2018	1000	23.2	8.6	18.4	27.7
LSPN	7–17 May 2018	1000	22.05	8.10	27.60	25.43
Populi Center	15–22 January 2018	800	41.4	9.0	16.4	21.3

=== Before nominations ===
Pollster	Date	Sample size	Results
Populi Center	26 November-6 December 2017	800	Herman Deru (22.1%), Dodi Reza Alex Noerdin (14.8%), Ishak Mekki (12.3%)
INES	19–30 October 2017	1667	Ishak Mekki (24.7%), Herman Deru (17.8%), Dodi Reza Alex Noerdin (12.5%)

== Results ==
=== Quick count ===
Pollster	Herman-Yahya	Rivai-Irwansyah	Ishak-Yudha	Noerdin-Kiemas
Populi Center	36.68	11.12	21.52	30.68
LSI	35.33	11.69	21.03	31.94
Charta Politika	35.19	12.74	20.73	31.33
