= Percha Leanpuri =

Indonesian politician (1986–2021)

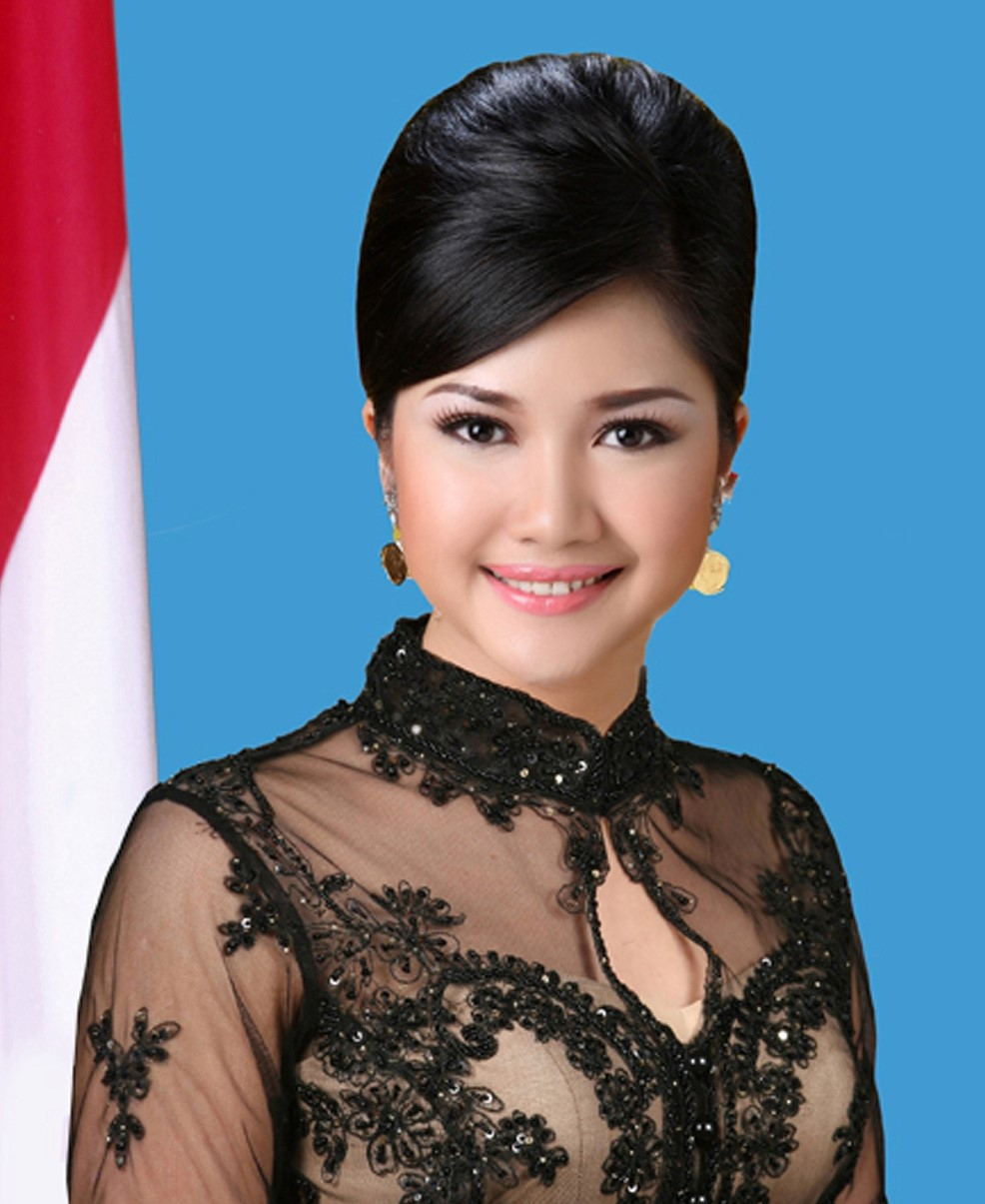
- Leanpuri in 2014

Member of the People's Representative Council of Indonesia
- In office 1 October 2019 – 19 August 2021
- Constituency: South Sumatra II

Member of the Regional Representative Council of Indonesia
- In office 1 October 2009 – 24 August 2015
- Constituency: South Sumatra

Literacy Ambassador of South Sumatra
- In office 27 November 2018 – 19 August 2021

Personal details
- Born: 24 June 1986 Belitang, South Sumatra, Indonesia
- Died: 19 August 2021 (aged 35) Palembang, Indonesia
- Party: NasDem Party

Percha Leanpuri (24 June 1986 – 19 August 2021) was an Indonesian politician. A member of the NasDem Party, she served on the People's Representative Council from 2019 to 2021 and the Regional Representative Council from 2009 to 2015. She was the daughter of Governor of South Sumatra Herman Deru.

Additionally, Leanpuri was Chairman of the Indonesian Bowling Association from 2019 to 2021.

== Biography ==
Her name is an acronym for Lematang, Ogan, Way Umpu, Komering Mix (Percampuran Lemarang, Ogan, Way Umpu, Komering). Leanpuri was the wife of Syamsuddin Isaac Suryamanggala. At the age of 23, she was elected to represent South Sumatra in the Regional Representative Council following her graduation from Sunway College. She served from 1 October 2009 to 24 August 2015. In 2019, Leanpuri was elected to represent the South Sumatra II district in the People's Representative Council.

In addition to her political career, Leanpuri owned a taxi company, Star Cab, based in Palembang and Lubuklinggau.

Percha Leanpuri died of complications from childbirth in Palembang on 19 August 2021 at the age of 35.
