= Edy Suandi Hamid =

Indonesian academic

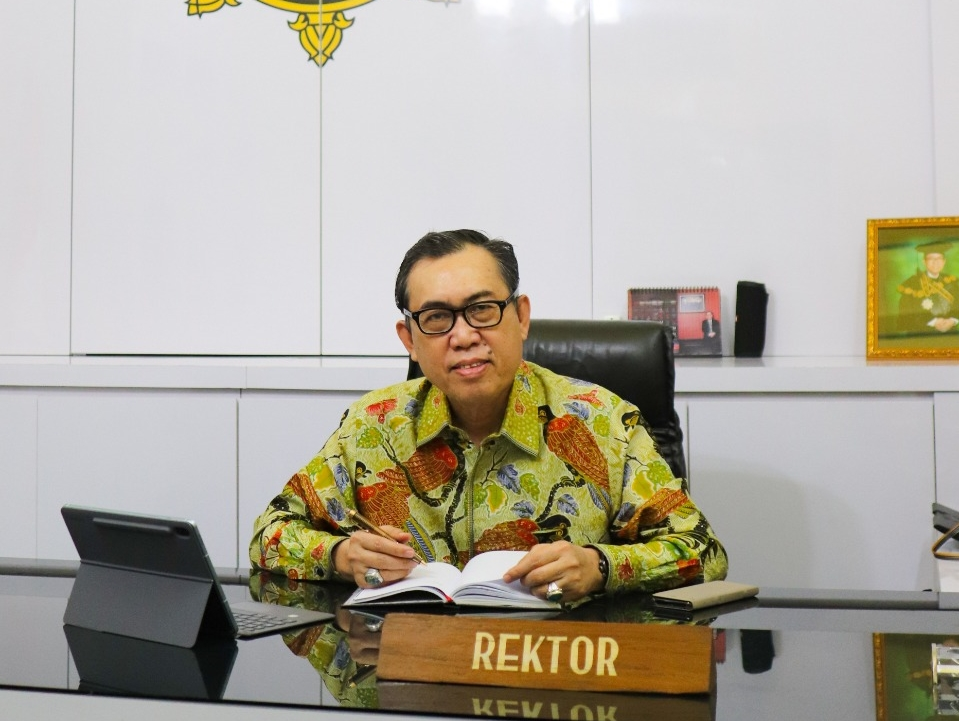

13th Rector of Universitas Islam Indonesia
- In office 2006–2014
- Preceded by: Dr. Ir. Luthfi Hasan, MS
- Succeeded by: Dr. Ir. Harsoyo, M.Sc.

Personal details
- Born: 1957 (age 68–69) Muara Enim Regency, Indonesia
- Spouse: Emy Rohayati
- Children: Dian Vita Alpha Suandi, Aprilia Beta Suandi, Paramitha Gama Suandi, Ulfa Ramadhani Delta Suandi, Muhammad Fauzan Hamid

Edy Suandi Hamid was the rector of the Islamic University of Indonesia between 2006 and 2014 and is a professor of economics at the Faculty of Economics, Islamic University of Indonesia, Yogyakarta. He studied at the Faculty of Economics, University of Gadjah Mada (Drs.), Faculty of Economics (M.Ec.) Thammasat University, Bangkok, Thailand and earned his doctorate degree at UGM. Edy Suandi Hamid was also researcher at the Centre for Rural and Regional Development UGM (1983–1995), researcher at Leknas-LIPI (1984) and the Centre for Economic Democracy Studies UGM, editor at the daily newspaper Kedaulatan Rakyat, Yogyakarta, and also a visiting scholar at Monash University (Melbourne, 1998). He has worked at the Faculty of Economics UII since 1985.

== Career ==
In his professional career, Hamid has been elected to and held positions in both government and private organizations which mainly focus in educational activities. He became a special commission member of Pancasila Economics Studies at Directorate General of Higher Education, Ministry of Education and Culture, Head of Research and Scientific Publication at the Indonesian Economists Association (ISEI 2000-2004), Chairman of Indonesian Economists Association (ISEI) Yogyakarta Branch and Vice Chairman of the Executive Committee of the Indonesian Economists Association (ISEI) Central Jakarta (2006-2009, 2009-2013), Vice Chairman of the Higher Education Council, Central Executive Board of Muhammadiyah (2005-2010, 2010-2015), Chairman of the Working Group Economics Affairs Indonesian Rector Forum (2006-2007), Executive Secretary of the Indonesian Rector Forum (2006-2007), Member of the Advisory Council of Indonesian Rector Forum (2008-2009), Chairman of Indonesian Rector Forum (2008-2009), Chairman of Advisory Council Indonesian Rector Forum (2009).

Edy Suandi Hamid also play active role in various organizations. In 2011, he was elected as the Chairman of Indonesian Private Universities Association (APTISI) for the period 2011-2015, the Head of HMI Alumni Foundation (YAHMI) Yogyakarta (currently), Member of National Consumer Protection Agency (BPKN) RI (2009-2012), Member of the Expert Council for Indonesian Shar’I Economic Society (2009-2011), Active Member in the Forum of National Defense Board (WANTANAS), and the Chairman of the Cooperation Board of Indonesian Islamic Private Universities (BKS-PTIS) 2009-2014/11.

Furthermore, under his leadership, Edy urged the necessity to manage the university as well as its study programs with advance information technology and good governance certified under ISO 9001:2008 issued by the Certification Board of TUV Rheinland Germany since 2009 onward. UII also put a lot of concern to establish its internal quality assurance system which according to site visitation conducted by DIKTI in 2008, placed the university as the number one in the field of internal quality assurance. In addition, UII also achieved “A” grade for institutional accreditation in 2013 based on SK BAN-PT No. 065/SK/BAN-PT/AK-IV/PT/II/2013. UII's score surpassed other private universities which achieved similar accreditation.

In his academic career, Edy had written at least 25 books, published by several Indonesian universities such as University of Islam Indonesia, University of Gadjah Mada, and Universitas Terbuka. The books particularly discussed his field of interest in economic science. Notable books which he wrote, for example “Economic Development in Indonesia: From Centralization to Decentralization”, “Vertical Fiscal Inequity and Alternative Formula for Public Allocation Fund”, and “Professionalism in the Economic and Business Perspective and the Challenge in Indonesia”.
