= Ratu Dewa =

Indonesian politician

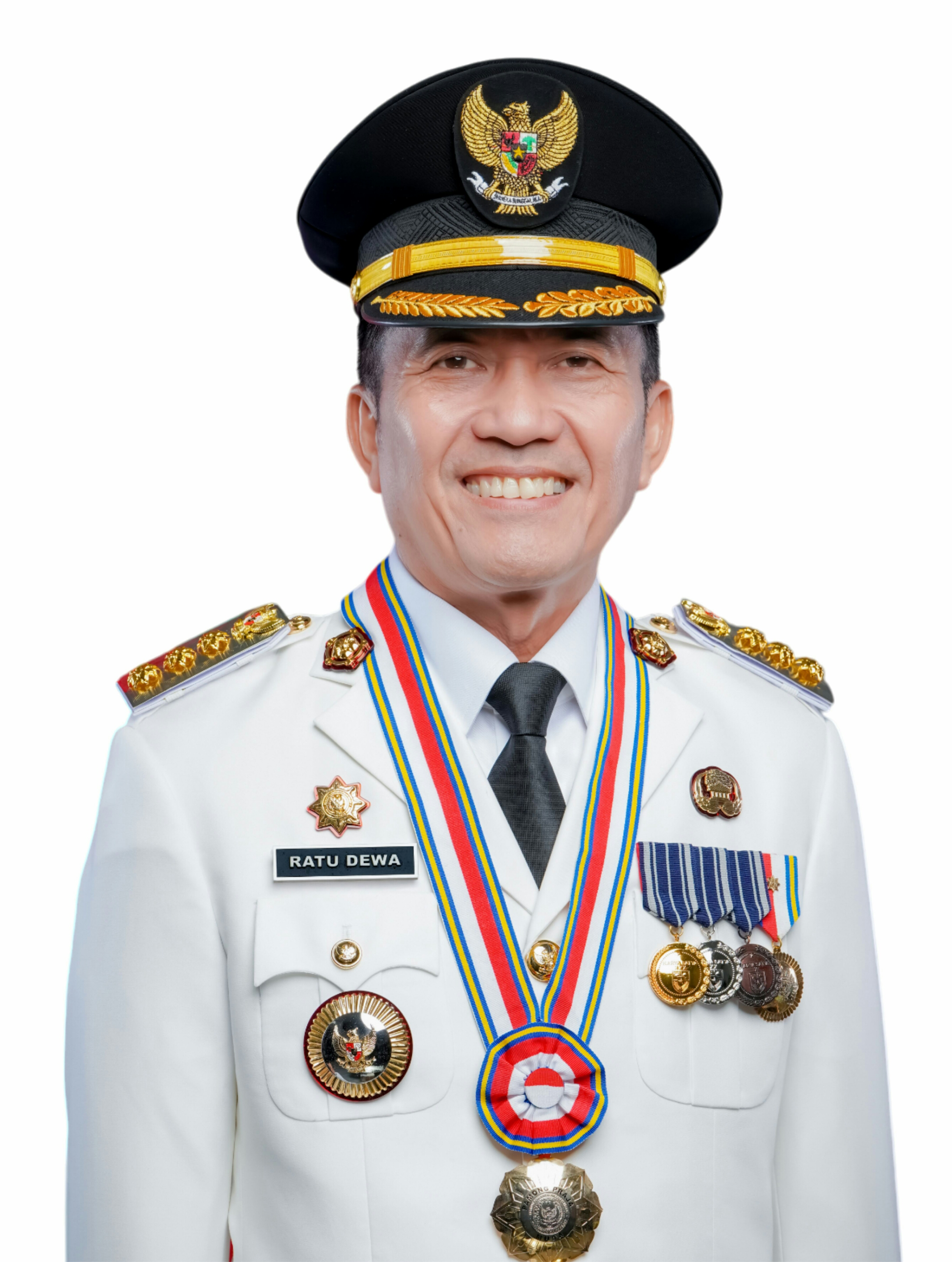

13th Mayor of Palembang
- Incumbent
- Assumed office 20 February 2025
- President: Prabowo Subianto
- Governor: Herman Deru
- Lieutenant: Prima Salam
- Preceded by: Cheka Virgowansyah (acting)
- Acting
- In office 18 September 2023 – 19 June 2024
- President: Joko Widodo
- Governor: Herman Deru; Agus Fatoni (acting)
- Preceded by: Harnojoyo
- Succeeded by: Ucok Abdulrauf Damenta (Acting)

Personal details
- Born: August 17, 1969 (age 57) Muara Kuang, Ogan Ilir, South Sumatra
- Party: Gerindra
- Spouse: Dewi Sastrani
- Education: IAIN Raden Fatah (Drs.); Sriwijaya University (M.Si.)

Ratu Dewa (born 17 August 1969) is an Indonesian politician from the Gerindra Party and a former bureaucrat who is currently the incumbent mayor of Palembang, South Sumatra serving in the position since 2025. Ratu had previously held the position temporarily in his capacity as the city's secretary from 2023 to 2024. He also held multiple prominent offices within the city's government, such as the secretary of the city's electoral commission and chief of public relations. He is also the leader of Gerindra in Palembang.

== Early life ==
Ratu Dewa was born on 17 August 1969 in the village of Rantau Sialang, located in the Muara Kuang district of Ogan Ilir Regency, South Sumatra as the eighth child of Cik Den Tambun, a teacher, and Zalipah, a farmer. He began his formal education at Negeri Rantau Sialang elementary school from 1975 to 1981 before moving to Palembang to attend Gajah Mada Middle School and Gaja Mada High School, completing his secondary education in 1987. Although he initially aspired of becoming an agricultural engineer, he studied Islamic fundamentals at the Raden Fatah State Islamic Institute in Palembang and graduated in 1992. During the graduation ceremony, the city's secretary delivered a speech, which prompted his mother to express her wish for Dewa to one day hold that same office.

== Bureaucratic career ==
Dewa’s career began in 1993 as a civil servant at the South Sumatra information office. Over the next decade, he held various positions within the provincial government, including serving as a special staff member to the South Sumatra's information chief and later as the chief of operations within the office. After the information office was dissolved, Dewa was reassigned to serve directly under governor Rosihan Arsyad and served as his administrative staff. He later served a number of public relations and secretarial roles within the provincial government. By 2006, Dewa was assigned to the province's transportation service, which allowed him to undertook master's studies in public policy at the Sriwijaya University. He graduated from the university in 2008.

By 2010, Dewa was appointed as the secretary of the city's electoral commission, where he oversaw preparations for the city's mayoral elections in 2013. He was then appointed as the chief of public relations and protocol on 30 April 2014. He consecutively served as the city's chief of investment and integrated services in 2015 and chief of personnel and human resources development in 2016. As human resources chief, Dewa defended the mayor's instruction to make Fajr prayers mandatory for the city's civil servant, stating that it allows them to engage with the populace and to regulate their behavior.

On 1 April 2019, Ratu was appointed as the city's secretary by mayor Harnojoyo after passing a selection process that involved two other senior bureaucrats within the city government. During his tenure, which was marred by the COVID-19 pandemic, he banned civil servants from returning to their hometown in order to contain the virus and appealed to parents in the city not to bring their child to the movies. Following the expiry of Harnojoyo's mayoral term, on 18 September 2023 Ratu Dewa was installed as the city's acting mayor. As acting mayor, Ratu oversaw the establishment of a 24-hour security post near Kuto Besak fortress, the city's major tourist site, to address thuggery in the area.

== Mayor of Palembang ==
As early as 2023, Ratu had been named as a prospective candidate to run in the city's mayoral election. His candidacy was confirmed following his resignation from his acting mayoralty in June 2024 and as the city's secretary a month later. A survey conducted by Indonesian Survey Agency named Ratu as the most popular mayoral candidate, receiving support from 55% to 70% of the total sample. Ratu picked Prima Salam from the Gerindra Party as his running mate and the pair declared their candidacy on 29 August 2024, with promises on ensuring clean water access to Palembang residents and tackling areas prone to flood. The pair was supported by three major parties: Gerindra, PDIP, and Golkar, as well as 11 non-parliamentary parties. At the election held on 27 November 2024, Ratu won with 352,696 votes, or 46.52% of the total vote. The constitutional court rejected attempts by his electoral opponents to dispute the results, leaving the results unchanged. Ratu was installed as the city's mayor alongside with other regional chiefs from all over Indonesia on 20 February 2025. In February 2026, Ratu was named as the chair of the party's branch in Palembang, succeeding his deputy mayor who was slated as the treasurer of the party's provincial branch in South Sumatra. The change was part of the party's post-electoral reorganization in South Sumatra.
