= Romi Herton =

Indonesian politician and businessman

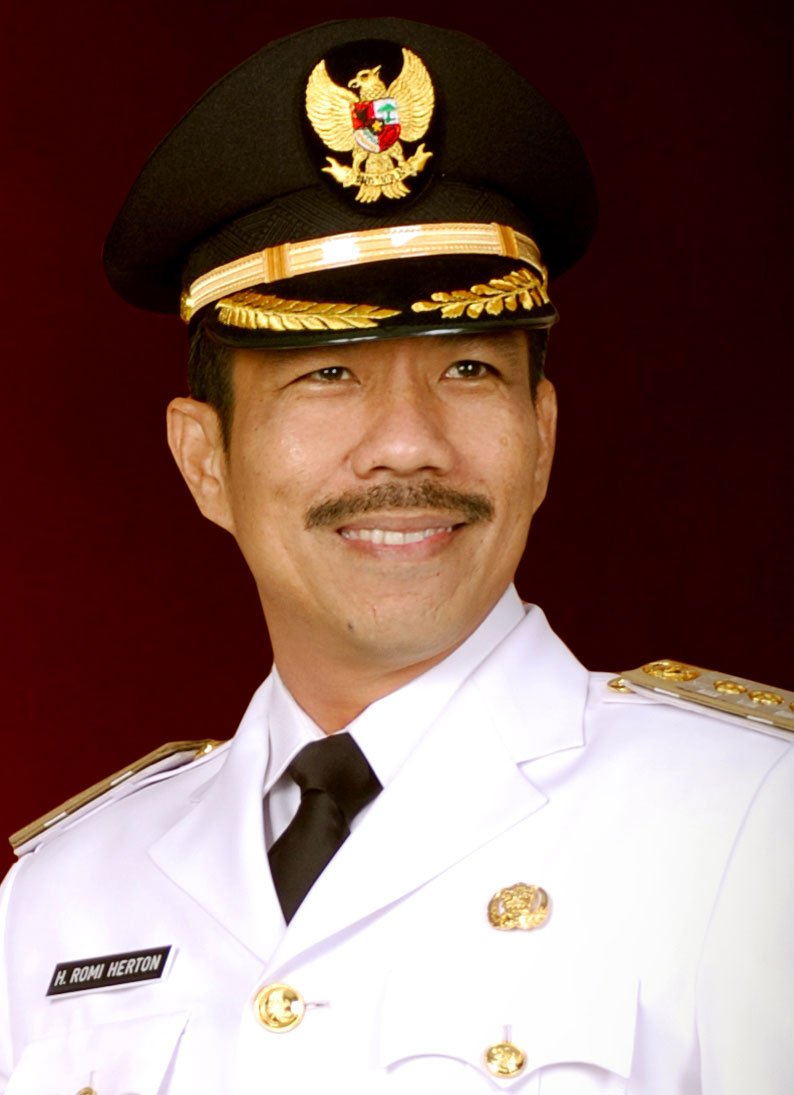

16th Mayor of Palembang
- In office 21 July 2013 – 4 August 2015
- Preceded by: Eddy Santana Putra
- Succeeded by: Harnojoyo

Vice Mayor of Palembang
- In office 2008–2013
- Mayor: Eddy Santana Putra
- Preceded by: Tolhah Hasan
- Succeeded by: Harnojoyo

Personal details
- Born: 19 April 1965; Metro, Lampung, Indonesia
- Died: 28 September 2017 (aged 52); South Tangerang, Banten, Indonesia

Romi Herton (19 April 1965 – 28 September 2017) was an Indonesian politician and businessman who served as the mayor of Palembang. He served actively between 2013 and 2014, and remained formally a mayor until 2015 when he was removed from his post. Before becoming mayor, he had been the deputy mayor for five years.

Born in Lampung, Herton was a member of PDI-P. In 2015, he was sentenced to six years in prison for bribing Akil Mochtar in an electoral dispute. He died due to a heart attack during his sentence.

== Background ==
Romi Herton was born in the city of Metro in Lampung on 19 April 1965. He is married to Masyito, and the couple has four children. After Herton's tenure, his sister Fitrianti Agustinda would become the deputy mayor of Palembang.

== Career ==
Herton started his career as a civil servant for the South Sumatra provincial government. He later resigned and became a businessman, operating fuel stations among other businesses. Entering politics in 2008, he ran as the running mate to Eddy Santana Putra in Palembang's 2008 mayoral election, winning the four-candidate race.

After five years, he ran as mayor in the 2013 election with Harnojoyo as his running mate. Following the election, the General Elections Commission declared his opponent Sarimuda the winner with him having won 316,923 votes to Herton's 316,915. Herton then went to the Constitutional Court, which ruled in his favor, with Herton ending up with an advantage of 23 votes. Herton was eventually sworn in as mayor by governor Alex Noerdin on 21 July 2013.

Herton was also the head of PDI-P's branch in Palembang.

He was made a suspect by the Corruption Eradication Commission along with his wife in June 2014 for bribing Constitutional Court judge Akil Mochtar in order to rule in his favor in the electoral dispute. He was sentenced to six years in prison on 9 March 2015, while his wife received a four-year sentence.

Due to the investigation, he was initially deactivated from his position with his deputy Harnojoyo becoming acting mayor. Following his conviction, he was officially removed from his post in August 2015.

== Prison and death ==
Herton was initially imprisoned in Bandung, but in 2017 he was moved to a prison in Bogor. On early morning, 28 September, he experienced breathing difficulties and was rushed to a hospital in South Tangerang, but he was declared dead upon arrival due to heart attack. He was buried the following day in Palembang.
