= Riezky Aprilia =

Indonesian politician (born 1982)

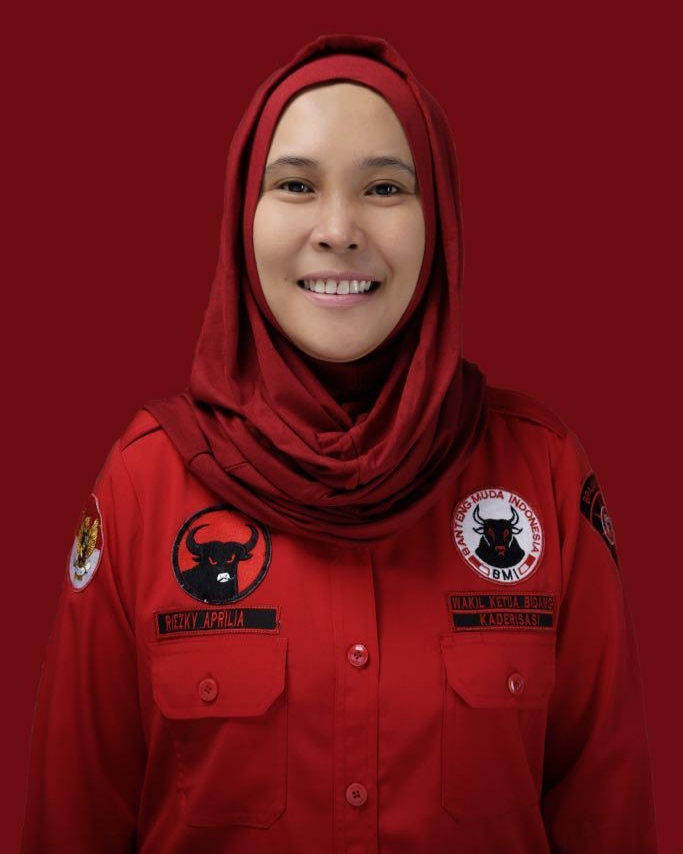
- Riezky in 2019

Member of People's Representative Council
- In office 1 October 2019 – 1 October 2024
- Constituency: South Sumatra I

Personal details
- Born: Riezky Aprilia; 18 April 1982 (age 44) Palembang, South Sumatra, Indonesia
- Party: Indonesian Democratic Party of Struggle
- Spouse: Giovanni Battista Monsafor
- Education: Padjadjaran University
- Occupation: Politician

Riezky Aprilia (born 18 April 1982), nicknamed Kiki, is an Indonesian politician who became a member of the 2019–2024 House of Representatives (DPR) of the Republic of Indonesia (RI).

== Education ==
Riezky went to study at Xaverius Maria Palembang Junior High School from 1973 to 1996; SD Kartika 2 Palembang from 1987 to 1993; SMA Negeri 2 Palembang from 1996 to 1999; S1 Bandung College of Law from 2004 to 2008; and obtained her master's degree at the S2 University of Padjadjaran from 2009 to 2011.

== Career ==
=== Early career ===
Hetifah began her career as the owner of Green Hill Muay Thai Sports Camp in South Jakarta in 2014; the owner of Kamo Housing Jakarta in 2009; the owner of Fabi Housing Bandung in 2007; and commissioner of PT. Telaga Indonas Gas in 2007; staff at Ardan Radio MindWork from 2004 to 2005; owner of Villa Ravi Housing Bandung in 2003; and financial consultant Astra CMG Life Bandung from 2002 to 2003.

Additionally, she also served as the deputy treasurer of the National Committee of Indonesian Youth (KNPI) West Java Province from 2007 to 2010; the head of Nasdem Youth Guard DKI Jakarta from 2011 to 2013; and Ormas Perindo Declarator from 2013 to 2014.

=== Political career ===
In the Indonesian Democratic Party of Struggle (DPI-P) for the first South Sumatran Electoral District in the 2019 Election, Riezky received the second-highest number of votes. Nazarudin Kiemas was the first PDI-P candidate to receive the most votes in the electoral district. However, the General Elections Commission (KPU) appointed her as a member of the elected DPR 2019–2024 because Nazarudin passed away. In 2018, she was also listed as a candidate for deputy mayor of Lubuklinggau, South Sumatra, before filing for the DPR RI, but was unsuccessful.

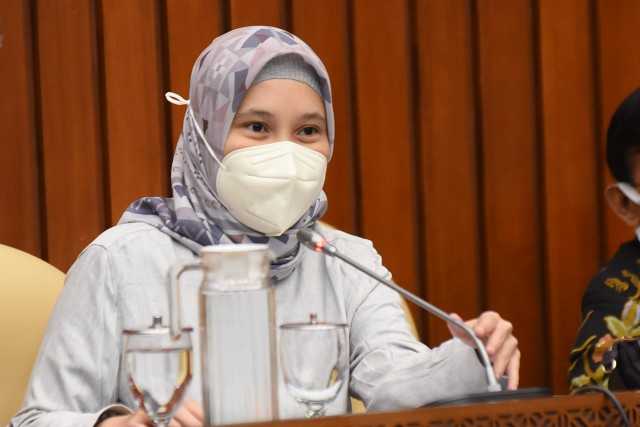
Riezky drawing attention to the problem of inadequate waste management in 2021

Riezky said that Saeful Bahri had urged her to step down from consideration for the 2019–2024 DPR RI. When she was called as a witness for defendant Saeful on 2 April 2020, in the Corruption Court in Central Jakarta, she acknowledged this. According to the prosecutor, the funds were provided so that Wahyu Setiawan may petition the KPU to grant Riezky's request for an inter-time change (PAW) to Harun Masiku. With 44,402 votes, Riezky was qualified to hold office and be a part of the DPR RI.

On 2 August 2022, Riezky evaluated that Puan Maharani's political safari represented a portion of the message conveyed by PDI-P Megawati Sukarnoputri, the general chairman. Among other things, to initiate contact with political parties. She underlined that the battle to develop Indonesia in the future is the reason for the early visit to different locations; hearing the people is crucial to honing understanding at the same rate.

Riezky was referred to the Honorary Court of the DPR (MKD) on 2 September 2022, for the "wrong medicine" comment that she had given to Syahrul Yasin Limpo, the Minister of Agriculture, during a work meeting. She said that by criticising her work partner, she was merely following the law. She then gave Yasin Limpo an explanation of her comments, with acknowledgment that the only rhetorical devices she employed to express her disapproval of Yasin Limpo were linguistic ones.

== Personal life ==
On 18 April 1982, Riezky was born in Palembang. She is the daughter of Riduan Effendi Sulaiman, the former mayor of Lubuklinggau for two terms. At the moment, she is wed to Giovanni Battista Monsafor, and together they have four kids.

== Electoral history ==
Election	Legislative institution	Constituency	Political party	Votes	Results
2019	People's Representative Council of the Republic of Indonesia	South Sumatra I	Indonesian Democratic Party of Struggle	44,402	Elected
