= Arlan (Indonesian politician) =

Indonesian businessman and politician

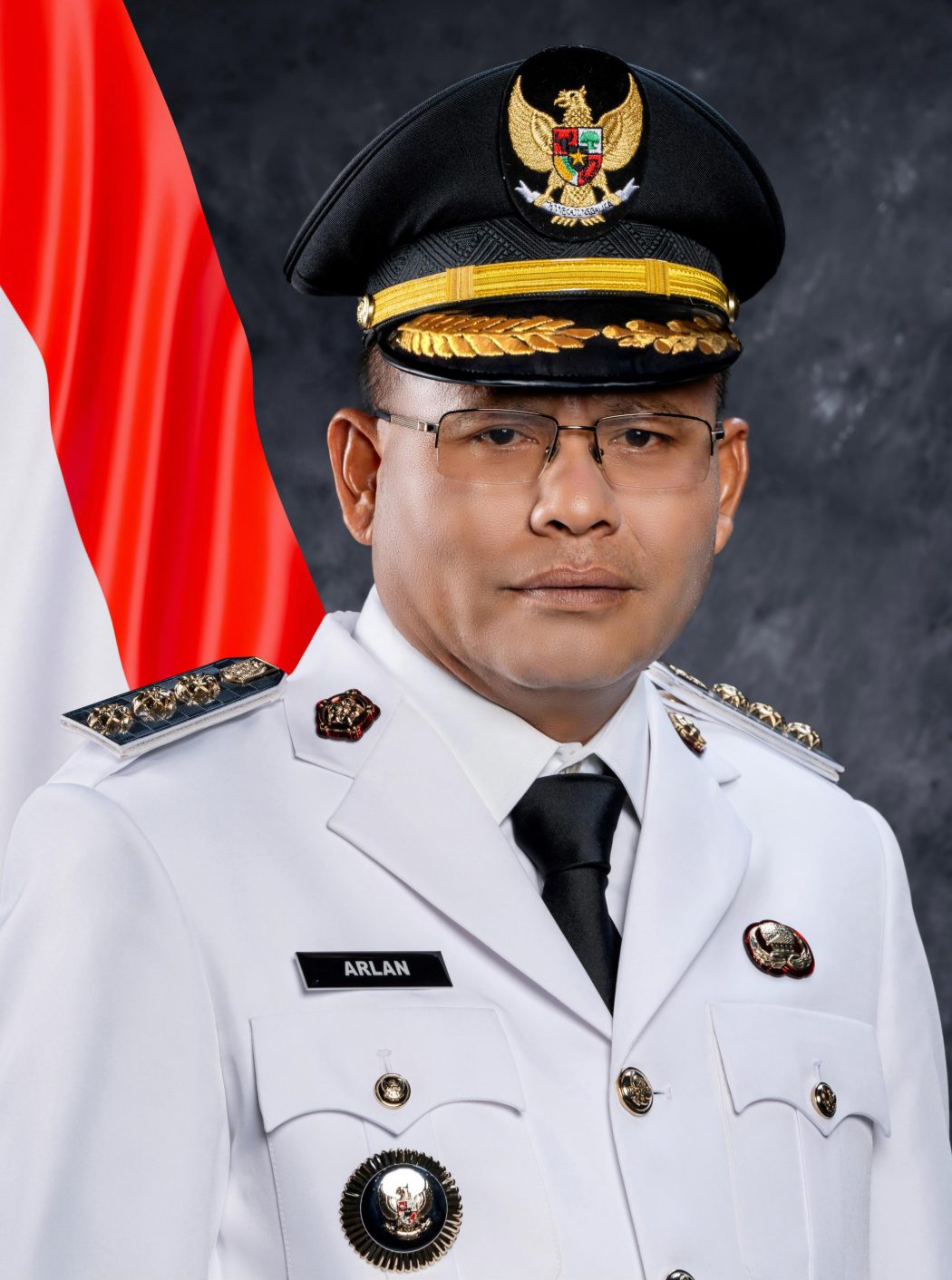
- Portrait as mayor, 2025

3rd Mayor of Prabumulih
- Incumbent
- Assumed office 20 February 2025
- Preceded by: Ridho Yahya; Elman (act.)

Personal details
- Born: 30 March 1975 (age 50) Ogan Komering Ulu, South Sumatra, Indonesia
- Political party: Gerindra

Arlan (born 30 March 1975) is an Indonesian businessman and politician of the Gerindra Party who has served as the mayor of Prabumulih, South Sumatra, since February 2025. Prior to becoming mayor, he engaged in natural rubber trading.

== Early life ==
Arlan was born on 30 March 1975 in the village of Bandar Jaya, in Ogan Komering Ulu Regency of South Sumatra. He was the third of seven children of Basri and Husiah. He completed elementary and middle school in Ogan Komering Ulu before he moved to Prabumulih where he completed high school.

== Career ==
Arlan initially entered the natural rubber trading business, but his initial attempt failed and he went bankrupt in 1997. He spent some time working for others in the rubber business before restarting his own business in 2003 with more success. His business would have several hundred employees, purchasing rubber from several thousand farmers. He also started a construction company.

Politically, Arlan had joined the Gerindra Party shortly after the party was founded.

=== Mayor ===
In 2024, Arlan ran as mayor of Prabumulih with the backing of ten parties led by Gerindra, with Hanura politician Franky Nasril as his running mate. Arlan and Nasril won the three-way race with 59,492 votes (53.3%), and they were sworn in on 20 February 2025.

As mayor, Arlan designated 800 hectares of land within the city as agricultural land, which could be used by farmers at no charge. He also announced an increase in payments and benefits to community security officers in Prabumulih.

On 5 September 2025, a car carrying Arlan's daughter was stopped from entering his school at Prabumulih's State Middle School No. 1 (SMPN 1 Prabumulih). Shortly thereafter, the school's headmaster Roni Ardiansyah and the involved security guard, Ageng Winoto, were transferred away from the school. A farewell ceremony for Ardiansyah went viral on social media, and the transfer was soon reversed. Following an investigation, the Ministry of Home Affairs announced that Arlan had been at fault due to bypassing procedures in removing Ardiansyah, and issued a written warning. Arlan's daughter later moved to another middle school in Prabumulih.

== Personal life ==
Arlan is in a polygamous relationship, with four wives whom he introduced to the public during his 2024 mayoral campaign. His eldest daughter from his first wife Linda Apriliana, Leoni Ayu Pratiwi, was elected into Prabumulih's Regional House of Representatives in the 2024 legislative election.
