= 2024 South Sumatra gubernatorial election =

- 27 November 2024
- Turnout: 72.44% (▲3.24pp)
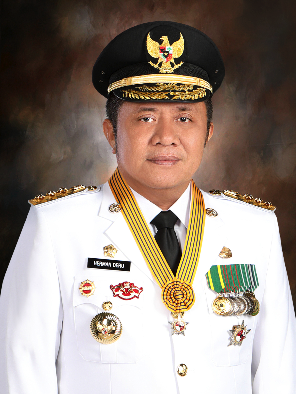

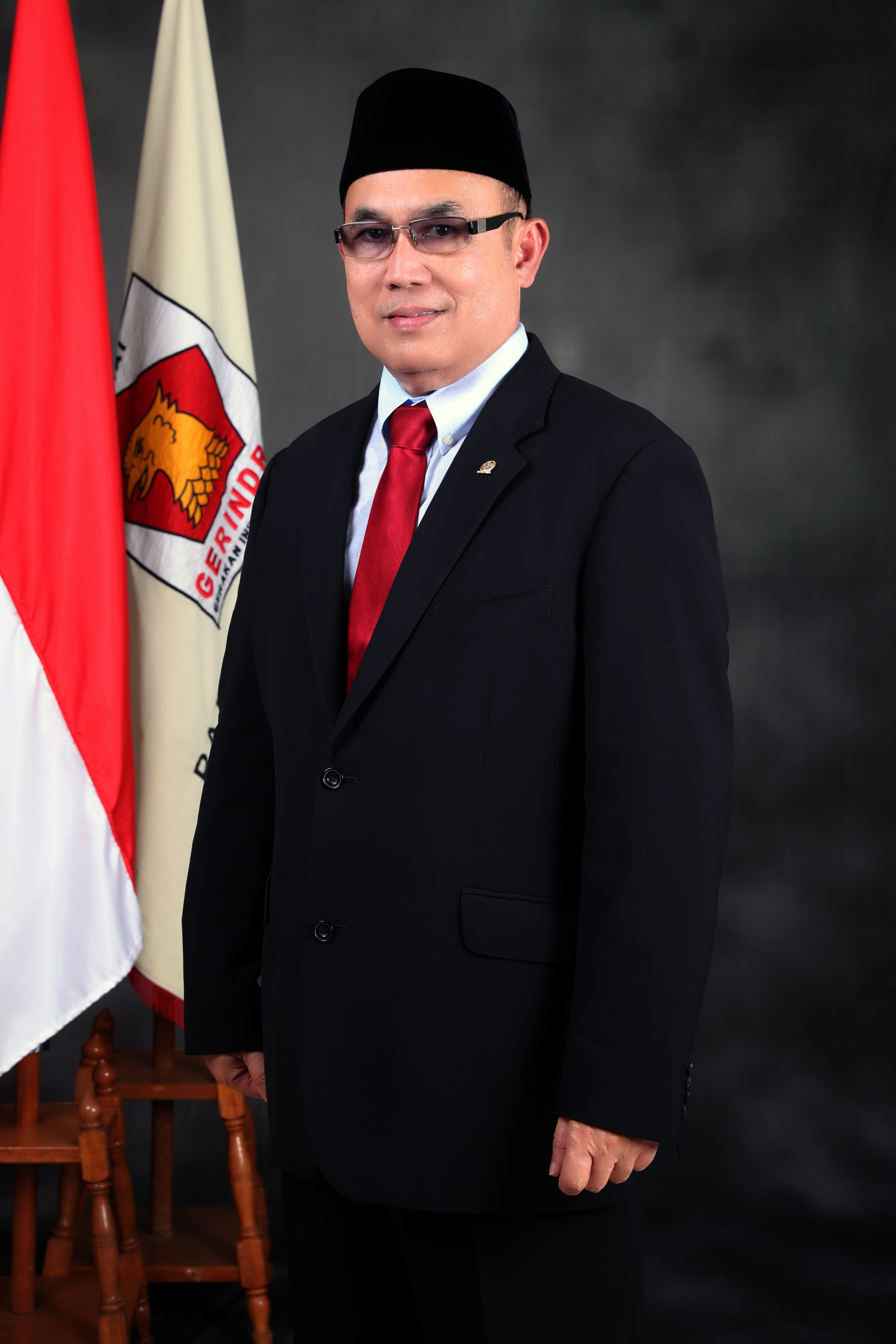

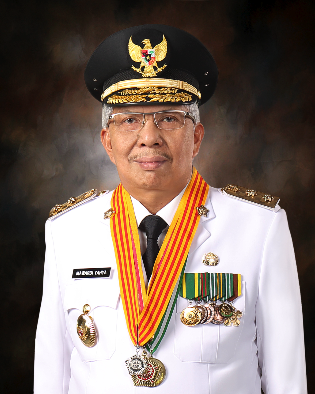
Candidate	Herman Deru	Eddy Santana Putra	Mawardi Yahya
Party	NasDem	Gerindra (Note: Despite Eddy being a member of Gerindra, the party instead backed Mawardi. Eddy was nominated by the PDI-P.)	Gerindra
Alliance	–	–	KIM Plus
Running mate	Cik Ujang	Riezky Aprilia	Anita Noeringhati
Popular vote	2,220,437	1,082,241	999,141
Percentage	51.61%	25.16%	23.23%
- Results map by district
Governor before election
Elen Setiadi (acting)
Independent
Elected Governor
Herman Deru
NasDem

The 2024 South Sumatra gubernatorial election was held on 27 November 2024 as part of nationwide local elections to elect the governor and vice governor of South Sumatra for a five-year term. The previous election was held in 2018. Former Governor Herman Deru of the NasDem Party won the election with 51% of the vote. Former Palembang Mayor Eddy Santana Putra, a member of the Gerindra Party who was nominated by the Indonesian Democratic Party of Struggle (PDI-P), received 25%. Gerindra's Mawardi Yahya, a former vice governor, placed third with 23%.

== Electoral system ==
The election, like other local elections in 2024, follow the first-past-the-post system where the candidate with the most votes wins the election, even if they do not win a majority. It is possible for a candidate to run uncontested, in which case the candidate is still required to win a majority of votes "against" an "empty box" option. Should the candidate fail to do so, the election will be repeated on a later date.

== Candidates ==
According to electoral regulations, in order to qualify for the election, candidates were required to secure support from a political party or a coalition of parties controlling 15 seats in the South Sumatra Regional House of Representatives (DPRD). As no parties won 15 or more seats, parties will be required to form coalitions to nominate a candidate. Candidates may alternatively demonstrate support in form of photocopies of identity cards, which in South Sumatra's case corresponds to 474,477 copies. No candidates registered in this method within the deadline given by the General Elections Commission.

=== Potential ===
The following are individuals who have either been publicly mentioned as a potential candidate by a political party in the DPRD, publicly declared their candidacy with press coverage, or considered as a potential candidate by media outlets:

- Herman Deru (NasDem), previous governor.
- Mawardi Yahya (Gerindra), previous vice governor.

- Harnojoyo (Demokrat), former mayor of Palembang (as running mate).

- Heri Amalindo (PDI-P), regent of Penukal Abab Lematang Ilir.

- Popo Ali Martopo (Golkar), regent of South Ogan Komering Ulu (as running mate).

- Eddy Santana Putra (Gerindra), member of the House of Representatives and former mayor of Palembang.
- Holda (Demokrat), member of the South Sumatra DPRD.

== Political map ==
Following the 2024 Indonesian general election, twelve political parties are represented in the South Sumatra DPRD:

Political parties	Seat count
Party of Functional Groups (Golkar)	12 / 75
Great Indonesia Movement Party (Gerindra)	11 / 75
NasDem Party	10 / 75
Indonesian Democratic Party of Struggle (PDI-P)	9 / 75
Democratic Party (Demokrat)	8 / 75
National Awakening Party (PKB)	7 / 75
Prosperous Justice Party (PKS)	7 / 75
National Mandate Party (PAN)	6 / 75
United Development Party (PPP)	2 / 75
Perindo Party	1 / 75
People's Conscience Party (Hanura)	1 / 75
Nusantara Awakening Party (PKN)	1 / 75

== Results ==
Candidate	Running mate	Party	Votes	%
Herman Deru	Cik Ujang	NasDem Party	2,220,437	51.62
Eddy Santana Putra	Riezky Aprilia	Gerindra Party	1,082,241	25.16
Mawardi Yahya	Anita Noeringhati	Gerindra Party	999,141	23.23
Total			4,301,819	100.00
Valid votes			4,301,819	93.04
Invalid votes			322,037	6.96
Total votes			4,623,856	100.00
Registered voters/turnout			6,382,739	72.44
Source: KPU Sumatera Selatan

Candidate vote share by district
Herman–Ujang

Eddy–Riezky

Mawardi–Anita
