= Mahyuddin N. S. =

Indonesian politician and academic (1947–2021)

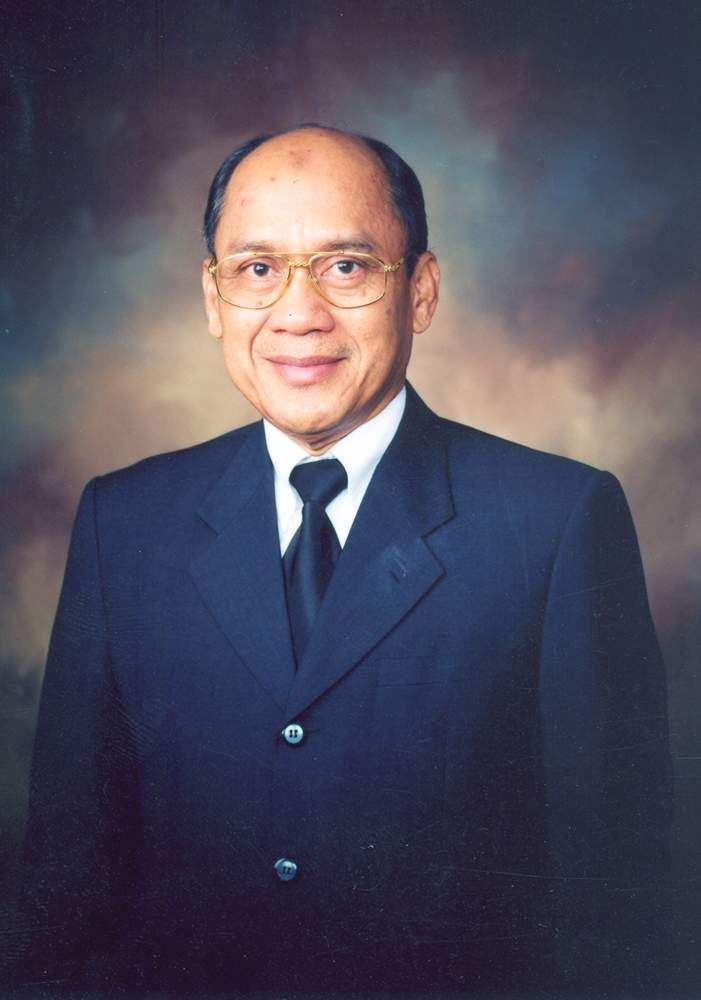
- Mahyuddin in 2003

Member of the People's Representative Council
- In office 1 October 2009 – 1 October 2014
- President: Susilo Bambang Yudhoyono
- Parliamentary group: Democratic Party
- Constituency: South Sumatra I
- Majority: 75,695

Governor of South Sumatra
- In office 19 June 2008 – 7 November 2008; Acting until 11 July 2008
- President: Susilo Bambang Yudhoyono
- Preceded by: Syahrial Oesman
- Succeeded by: Alex Noerdin

Vice Governor of South Sumatra
- In office 7 November 2003 – 19 June 2008
- President: Megawati Soekarnoputri; Susilo Bambang Yudhoyono
- Preceded by: Thobroni Hs
- Succeeded by: Eddy Yusuf

Personal details
- Born: 14 September 1947 Lahat Regency, South Sumatra, Indonesia
- Died: 8 April 2021 (aged 73) Palembang, South Sumatra
- Party: Democratic Party
- Spouse: Halipah
- Children: Muhammad Taufik Roseno; Yudha Pratomo; Anggia Primasari
- Parents: Natimbul (father); Same'a (mother)
- Profession: Politician; academic

Mahyuddin Natimbul Same'a (14 September 1947 – 8 April 2021) was an Indonesian politician and academic who served as the vice governor of South Sumatra from 2003 to 2008 and as governor of South Sumatra in 2008. Following his five-month tenure as governor, Mahyuddin later served as a member of the People's Representative Council from 2009 to 2014.

== Early life ==
Mahyuddin was born on 14 September 1947 as the fourth son of the seven children of Natimbul and Same'a in the village of Tanjungkurung, located in the Lahat Regency. He began his studies at a local People's School at the age of seven and he later graduated from his elementary school in 1960. During his high school years, he worked in a local market. In 1963, he graduated from his junior high school and in 1967 he graduated from the Xaverius High School. He graduated from the Sriwijaya University in 1975 with a medical degree.

== Academic career ==
Mahyuddin started his career as a staff member at the biology faculty in Sriwijaya University. After attending specialized education on obstetrics and gynaecology at Airlangga University in 1984, Mahyuddin became a lecturer at Sriwijaya University. Later on, he was also appointed a director for family planning in the Palembang Central Hospital.

After five years teaching in the university, Mahyuddin was appointed the secretary for the medical faculty in the university. He was later promoted to assistant dean in 1996 and as assistant rector in 1999. He ended his career in the university after being elected as vice governor in 2003.

== Political career ==
=== Vice Governor ===
Mahyuddin entered politics shortly before the 2003 South Sumatra election, in which he ran with Syahrial Oesman. They placed first, winning 38 votes, one vote more than then-incumbent governor, Rosihan Arsyad, who also ran in the election. A political scandal occurred after the election, when fifteen MPs from the Indonesian Democratic Party of Struggle (PDI-P) endorsed Syahrial instead of party-approved Rosihan. Megawati Soekarnoputri, the president of Indonesia at that time who was the chairwoman of the PDI-P delayed the confirmation of the results due to this scandal. Mahyuddin and Syahrial were eventually inaugurated on 7 November 2003.

=== Governor ===
Then-governor of South Sumatra, Syahrial Oesman, resigned from the post on 19 June 2008 to run in the upcoming gubernatorial election. Mahyuddin assumed office after he resigned and was later inaugurated on 11 July 2008. His term ended on 7 November 2008. During his governorship, Mahyuddin enacted a decree which legally banned the existence of Ahmadiyya in South Sumatra.

=== Member of the People's Representative Council ===
Mahyuddin was elected into the People's Representative Council after gaining 75,695 votes from the South Sumatra I electoral district. He was assigned to the Commission X of the People's Representative Council, which handles education, youth affairs, sports, tourism, art and culture. Mahyuddin became the chairman of the commission on 21 October 2009. Mahyuddin handed over his office as chairman to Agus Hermanto after a three-year tenure.

He later ran again as a member of the People's Representative Council from the same party and constituency in 2014. He did not obtain enough votes for a parliamentary seat.

== Death ==
Mahyuddin died on 8 April 2021, reportedly around 23:45 in Palembang. He died due to COVID-19. A proper gubernatorial funeral for him could not be held due to his cause of death.
