= Muara Enim Regency =

Regency in South Sumatra, Indonesia

Coordinates: 4.2327°S 103.6141°E

Muara Enim Regency Kabupaten Muara Enim
- Regency
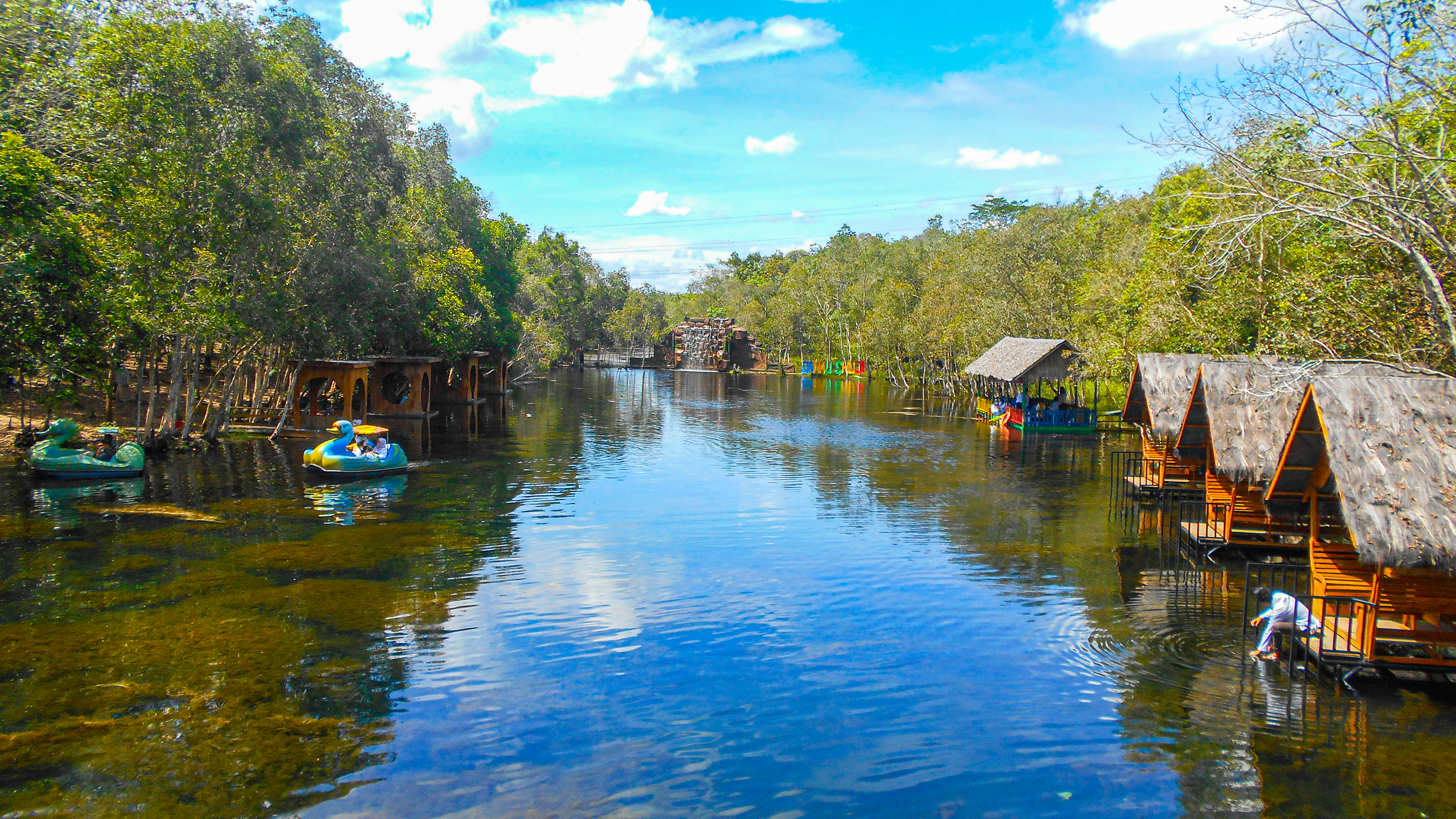
- Lake Shuji in Lembak

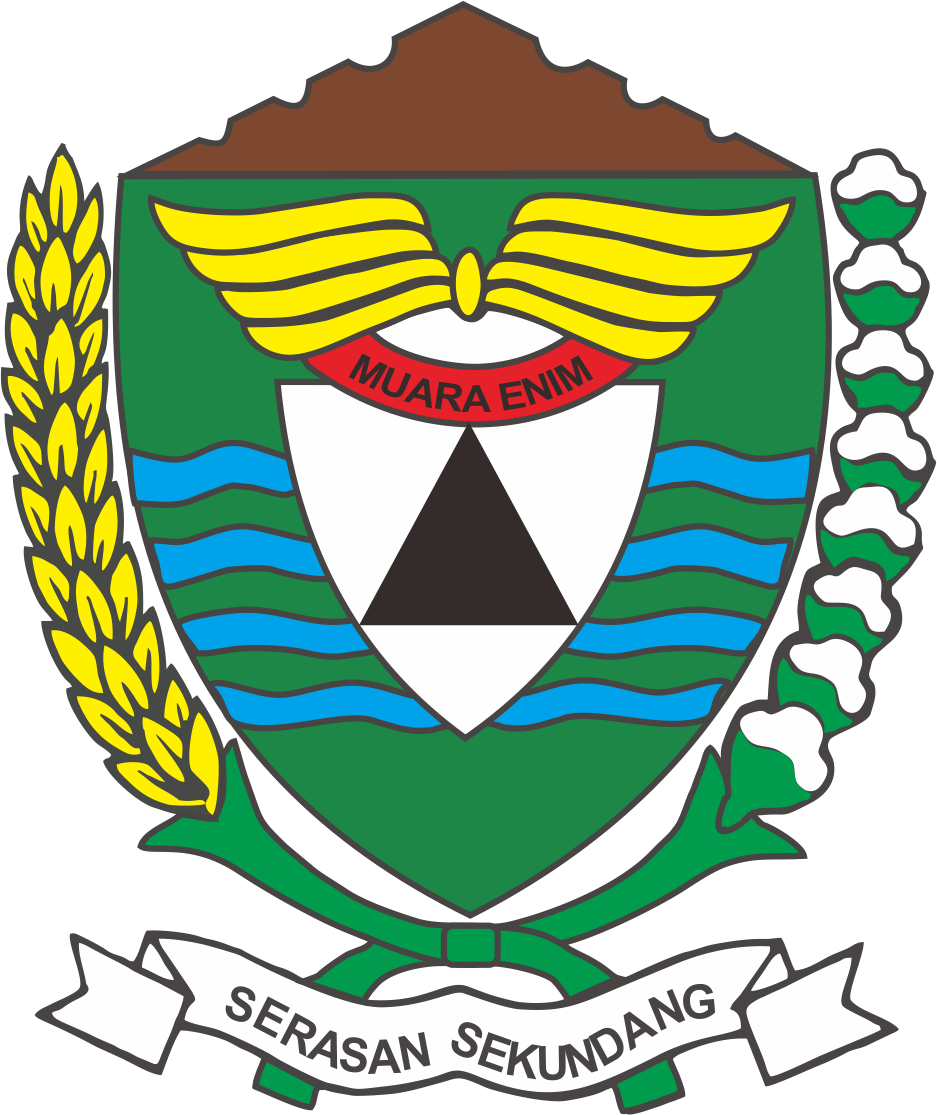
- Coat of arms
- Motto: Serasan Sekundang
- Location of Muara Enim Regency (in red) in South Sumatra, following the separation off of Penukal Abab Lematang Ilir Regency in 2012; this old map is before the late 2022 adjustments.
- Country: Indonesia
- Province: South Sumatra
- Regency seat: Muara Enim

Government
  - Regent: Edison
  - Vice Regent: Sumarni

Area
  - Total: 7,482.86 km^{2} (2,889.15 sq mi)

Population (mid 2025 estimate)
  - Total: 667,083
  - Density: 89.1481/km^{2} (230.893/sq mi)
- Time zone: UTC+7 (WIB)

Muara Enim Regency is a regency of South Sumatra Province, Indonesia. The regency seat is the town of Muara Enim. The city of Prabumulih is an administrative body separating the main part of Muara Enim to the south of the city from a smaller part to its north. The regency until late 2012 covered an area of 8,587.94 km² and had a population of 717,717 at the 2010 Census; however, on 14 December 2012 five districts from the Muara Enim Regency were split off to form the new Penukal Abab Lematang Ilir Regency.

As a result of this creation, the residual regency was left with two physically separate units, together covering 7,482.86 km.^{2} Within its reduced area it had a population of 551,202 at the 2010 Census and 612,900 at the 2020 Census, the latter comprising 312,953 males and 299,947 females; the official estimate as at mid 2025 was 667,083 (comprising 340,368 males and 326,715 females).

In late 2022 it was stated that another six districts were to be separated out to form a new Rambang Lubai Lematang Regency, which would have consisted of the six districts of Rambang, Lubai, Lubai Ulu, Belimbing, Rambang Niru and Empat Petulai Dangku, in the east-central part of the regency. These 6 districts in all comprised 70 villages (desa) with an area of 2,307.90 km^{2} and 179,259 people as at mid 2025. However, in view of the moratorium instituted since 2013 by the Indonesian Government on the creation of new provinces and regencies, this proposal has not been carried out as at 2026.

Mining and agricultural activities are abundant in the regency and it is also a producer of oil. Notable crops include rice and coconuts.

== Location ==
Bumi Serasan Sekundang is located in the heart of South Sumatra Province. The boundaries are:

North	Penukal Abab Lematang Ilir Regency, Banyuasin Regency, Palembang City
South	South Ogan Komering Ulu Regency, Kaur Regency (Bengkulu Province)
West	Musi Rawas Regency, Lahat Regency, Pagar Alam City
East	Ogan Komering Ulu Regency, Rambang Lubai Lematang Regency, Prabumulih City

== Administrative districts ==
Muara Enim Regency was divided as at 2000 into twenty-eight districts (kecamatan); however, six of these districts - Rambang Kapak Tengah (Central Rambang Kapak), Prabumulih Timur (East Prabumulih), Prabumulih Selatan (South Prabumulih), Prabumulih Barat (West Prabumulih), Prabumulih Utara (North Prabumulih) and Cambai - were separated from the regency on 21 June 2001 to create the independent city (kota) of Prabumulih, and another five of these districts - Talang Ubi, Penukal, Tanah Abang, Penukal Utara and Abab - were separated out from the regency on 14 December 2012 to form the new Penukal Abab Lematang Ilir Regency. Subsequently, four additional districts (Panang Enim, Lubai Ulu, Belimbing and Belida Darat) were created by the division of existing districts, while the former Rambang Dangku was split into two new districts (Rambang Nuru and Empat Petulai Dangku).

The resulting twenty-two districts (including the six intended to form the new Rambang Lubai Lematang Regency) are listed below with their areas and their populations at the 2010 Census and the 2020 Census, together with the official estimates as at mid 2025. The table also includes the locations of the district administrative centres, together with the number of villages in each district (comprising 245 rural desa and 10 urban kelurahan), and their post code(s). The topography of the regency comprises a southern group of five districts with an altitude of over 100 metres above sea level in the Bukit Barisan mountain chain, a west-central group of five districts, an east-central group of six districts (those intended to be split off), and finally a northern group of six districts of mainly swamp area facing directly with the Musi River basin, which (since the creation of the Penukal Abab Lematang Ilir Regency in December 2012) are physically separated from the rest of the Muara Enim Regency by the city of Prabumulih.

Kode Wilayah	Name of District (kecamatan)	Area in km^{2}	Pop'n Census 2010	Pop'n Census 2020	Pop'n Estimate mid 2025	Admin centre	No. of villages	Post code
16.03.08	Semende Darat Laut	269.14	12,895	14,740	16,256	Pulau Panggung	10	31358
16.03.10	Semende Darat Ulu	426.64	15,805	16,800	19,425	Aremantai	10	31355
16.03.09	Semende Darat Tengah	302.24	9,635	10,970	11,828	Seri Tanjung	12	31359
16.03.01	Tanjung Agung	517.10	37,516	29,020	30,981	Tanjung Agung	14	31354
16.03.27	Panang Enim	192.94	^{(a)}	13,370	13,492	Lebak Budi	12	31354
	Southern group	1,708.06	75,851	84,900	91,982		58	
16.03.15	Rambang	378.07	27,479	28,050	29,675	Sugih Waras	13	31175
16.03.14	Lubai	529.32	52,773	25,810	28,622	Beringin	10	31173
16.03.25	Lubai Ulu	478.49	^{(b)}	32,800	36,121	Karang Agung	11	31174
16.03.23	Belimbing	148.69	^{(c)}	25,550	27,533	Cinta Kasih	10	31352
16.03.03	Rambang Niru	634.98	^{(d)}	33,560	36,383	Tebat Agung	16	31172
16.03.26	Empat Petulai Dangku	138.35	^{(d)}	19,980	20,925	Dangku	10	31172
	East-Central group	2,307.90	n/a	165,750	179,259		70	
16.03.07	Lawang Kidul	287.26	62,887	72,120	79,550	Keban Agung	7 ^{(e)}	31711 -31713
16.03.02	Muara Enim (town)	187.08	61,585	73,550	84,879	Muara Enim	16 ^{(f)}	31311 -31315
16.03.11	Ujan Mas	311.13	23,214	26,750	27,648	Ujan Mas Baru	9	31351
16.03.04	Gunung Megang	471.36	56,405	35,310	36,924	Gunung Megang Dalam	13	31353
16.03.19	Benakat	451.96	8,764	9,640	11,079	Padang Bindu	6	31626
	West-Central group	1,708.79	n/a	217,370	240,080		51	
16.03.06	Gelumbang	705.57	53,829	61,320	66,224	Gelumbang	23 ^{(g)}	31170
16.03.17	Lembak	101.44	30,940	19,700	20,367	Lembak	10	31177
16.03.16	Sungai Rotan	344.14	29,995	31,930	34,655	Sukarami	19	31357
16.03.22	Muara Belida	204.67	7,594	7,940	8,559	Patra Tani	8	31178
16.03.21	Kelekar	138.03	9,381	11,020	12,113	Menanti	7	31176
16.03.24	Belida Darat	264.26	^{(h)}	12,990	13,844	Tanjung Bunut	10	31171
	Northern group	1,758.11	131,739	144,900	155,762		77	
	Totals	7,482.86	551,202	612,900	667,083	Muara Enim	255	

Notes:
(a) the 2010 population of the new Panang Enim District was included in the 2010 total for Tanjung Agung District, from which it was cut out.
(b) the 2010 population of the new Lubai Ulu District was included in the 2010 total for Lubai District, from which it was cut out.
(c) the 2010 population of the new Belimbing District was included in the 2010 total for Gunung Megang District, from which it was cut out.
(d) the 2010 populations of the new Rambang Niru and Empat Petulai Dangku Districts are included in the figure of 50,455 which was the total of the former Rambang Dangku District, which was divided to form the new districts.
(e) including three kelurahan (Pasar Tanjung Enim, Tanjung Enim and Tanjung Enim Selatan).
(f) including six kelurahan (Air Lintang, Muara Enim, Pasar I, Pasar II, Pasar III and Tungkal). (g) including one kelurahan (Gelumbang).
(h) the 2010 population of the new Belide Darat District was included in the 2010 total for Lembak District, from which it was cut out.

== Notable people ==
- Edy Suandi Hamid, academic
