= Harnojoyo =

Indonesian politician

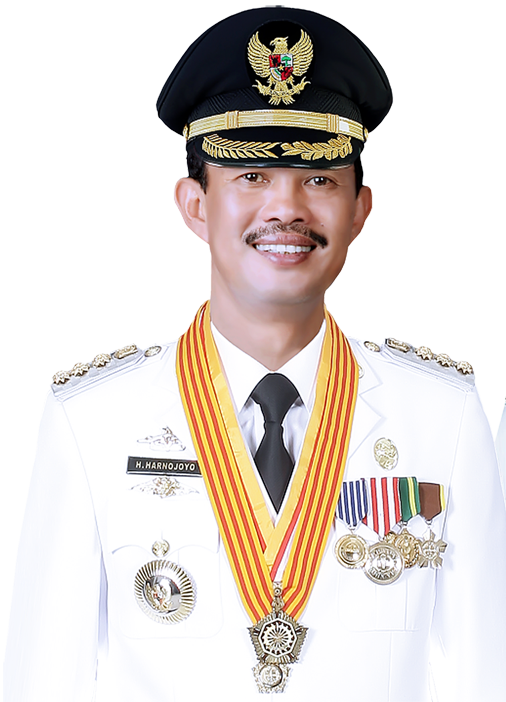

17th Mayor of Palembang
- In office 18 September 2018 – 18 September 2023
- Governor: Herman Deru
- Deputy: Fitrianti Agustinda
- Preceded by: Harobin (act.)
- Succeeded by: Ratu Alam (act.)
- In office 10 September 2015 – 21 July 2018 (acting since 9 December 2014)
- Governor: Alex Noerdin
- Deputy: Fitrianti Agustinda
- Preceded by: Romi Herton
- Succeeded by: Harobin (act.)

Vice Mayor of Palembang
- In office 21 July 2013 – 9 December 2014
- Mayor: Romi Herton
- Succeeded by: Fitrianti Agustinda

Speaker of Palembang City Council
- In office 2009–2013

Member of Palembang City Council
- In office 2004–2013

Personal details
- Born: 18 September 1967 (age 59) Lahat, South Sumatra, Indonesia
- Party: Democratic Party
- Spouse: Selviana Harnojoyo
- Children: 3
- Education: Bandar Lampung University

Harnojoyo (mononymic; born September 18, 1967) is an Indonesian politician of the Democratic Party who served as the mayor of Palembang, South Sumatra between 2014 and 2023. He was elevated into office following the arrest of his predecessor Romi Herton for bribery. He was initially elected as deputy with Herton as his running mate during the city's 2013 local elections. He ran in the simultaneous local elections of 2018, and was reelected.

== Personal life ==
He was born on 18 September 1967 in a village of Lahat from parents Sapril and Ruhinah. After completing his junior high school studies (SMP), he moved to the neighboring province of Lampung, working in Bali Bank and an assortment of other jobs before starting his university studies in Bandar Lampung University, majoring in Public Administration. He moved back to South Sumatra in 1997, living in its capital Palembang.

=== Family ===
He married Selviana in 1994 at the age of 27, and the couple's first children was born in 1996. They have three children.

== Career ==
He continued to work at Bali Bank following his move, now at its branch in Palembang. In 1998, he left to start his own business in poultry sales before he entered politics. He became a member of the then-nascent Democratic Party in 2003, before the election of its chairman Susilo Bambang Yudhoyono into presidency. In the 2004 elections, he became a member of the Palembang City Council and he was chosen as chairman following his re-election in the 2009-2014 tenure, coming from the city's 5th electoral district. He was first elected as the local chairman of the party in 2010, and remained an incumbent following his re-election in April 2017.

In 2013, he ran with Romi Herton in the city's mayoral elections. Initial results from the KPU showed a loss of the pair to Sarimuda-Nelly Rosiana. However, the two candidate pairs were separated by only 8 votes (316,923 to 316,915). Almost immediately, the pair brought a case to the Constitutional Court. Following a bribe of Rp 19.5 billion (US$2.01 million) to then-chief justice Akil Mochtar, their case was granted and the pair was declared winners of the election. Not long after starting office, Romi was investigated by the Corruption Eradication Commission and was found guilty, being sentenced to 6 years of prison in March 2015. Harnojoyo was not prosecuted, and was made mayor on 10 September 2015. He selected his former running mate's younger sister Fitrianti Agustinda as his deputy.

In 2017, he received an award from the Ministry of Administrative and Bureaucratic Reform. He dubbed his program in the city "Palembang EMAS" (Golden Palembang), where EMAS is the abbreviation for Elok, Madani, Aman dan Sejahtera (Beautiful, Civil, Safe and Prosperous). He has registered to run in the 2018 elections with his current deputy. His first term expired on 21 July 2018 with an acting mayor being appointed, but he was sworn back into office on 18 September 2018.

His term ended on 18 September 2023, and city secretary Ratu Dewa was appointed to replace him in an acting capacity. He has declared that he will run in the 2024 South Sumatra gubernatorial election as the vice-gubernatorial candidate of former vice governor Mawardi Yahya.
