= Prabumulih =

City in South Sumatra, Indonesia

- City
- City of Prabumulih; Kota Prabumulih
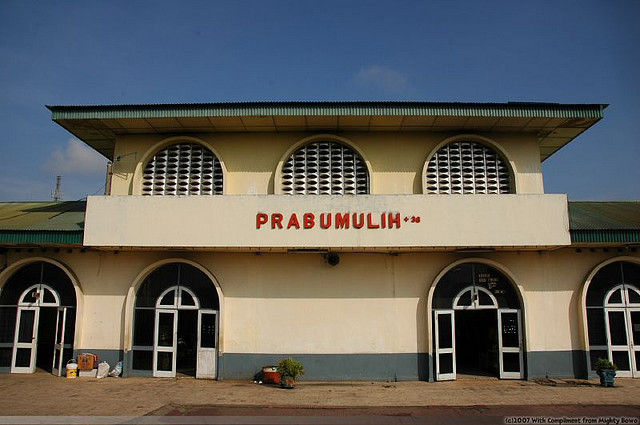
- A railway station in the city of Prabumulih, South Sumatra

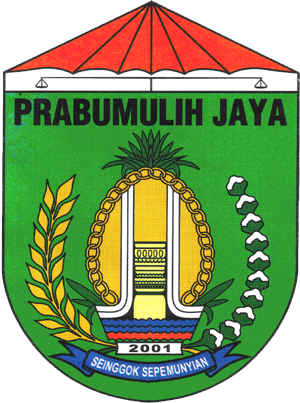
- Coat of arms
- Nickname: Kota Nanas (Indonesian : Pineapple City)
- Motto: Seinggok Sepemunyian
- Location within South Sumatra

- Location in Sumatra and Indonesia Prabumulih (Indonesia)
- Coordinates: 3°25′58″S 104°14′8″E
- Country: Indonesia
- Province: South Sumatra

Government
  - Mayor: Arlan
  - Vice Mayor: Franky Nasril

Area
  - Total: 447.31 km^{2} (172.71 sq mi)

Population (mid 2025 estimate)
  - Total: 214,821
  - Density: 480.25/km^{2} (1,243.8/sq mi)
- Time zone: UTC7 (Indonesia Western Time)
- Area code: (+62) 713
- Website: kotaprabumulih.go.id

Prabumulih is a city in South Sumatra, Indonesia. It was originally part of Muara Enim Regency, from which it was separated to become an independent city on 21 June 2001. It has an area of 447.31 km² and had a population of 161,814 at the 2010 Census and 193,196 at the 2020 Census; the official estimate as at mid 2025 was 214,821 (comprising 108,178 males and 106,643 females). Geographically, this city is located at 3°25′58″ South and 104°14′8″ East in the heart of the province, and it is surrounded on all sides by Muara Enim Regency, apart from a short stretch bordering Penukal Abab Lematang Ilir Regency.

== City borders ==
North	Lembak District, Muara Enim Regency and Tanah Abang District, Penukal Abab Lematang Ilir Regency
South	Rambang Lubai District, Muara Enim Regency
West	Rambang Dangku District, Muara Enim Regency
East	Lembak District and Gelumbang District, Muara Enim Regency

== Administrative districts ==
Prabumulih is administratively divided into six districts (kecamatan), tabulated below with their areas and their populations at the 2010 Census and the 2020 Census, together with the official estimates as at mid 2025. The table also includes the location of the district administrative centres, the number of administrative villages in each district (a total of 12 classed as rural desa and 25 as urban kelurahan), and its postal codes.

Kode Wilayah	Name of District (kecamatan)	Area in km^{2}	Pop'n Census 2010	Pop'n Census 2020	Pop'n Estimate mid 2025	Admin centre	Density per km^{2} (2025)	No. of kelu- rahan	No. of desa	Post codes
16.74.04	Rambang Kapak Tengah	125.56	10,881	12,805	14,755	Tanjung Rambang	117.51	1	8	31131 - 31135
16.74.02	Prabumulih Timur (East Prabumulih)	70.07	57,044	78,032	88,563	Prabujaya	1,263.92	8	-	31111 - 31117
16.74.06	Prabumulih Selatan (South Prabumulih)	48.69	17,014	21,136	23,528	Tanjung Raman	483.22	3	1	31112 - 31134
16.74.01	Prabumulih Barat (West Prabumulih)	125.32	29,569	30,588	32,673	Patih Galung	260.72	5	1	31121 - 31123
16.74.05	Prabumulih Utara (North Prabumulih)	10.95	31,524	31,673	33,402	Wonosari	3,050.41	5	-	31121 - 31126
16.74.03	Cambai	66.72	15,952	18,962	21,900	Cambai	328.24	3	2	31141 - 31145
	Totals	447.31	161,984	193,196	214,821		480.25	25	12	

== Economy ==
Prabumulih is one of main producers of crude oil and natural gas in South Sumatra, with oil production going back to the 1920s. The city is known as "kota nanas" (Pineapple City) as it is a center for pineapple production in the region.

== Airports ==
There used to be an airport in Prabumulih, which is no longer active.
