= Herman Deru =

Indonesian politician

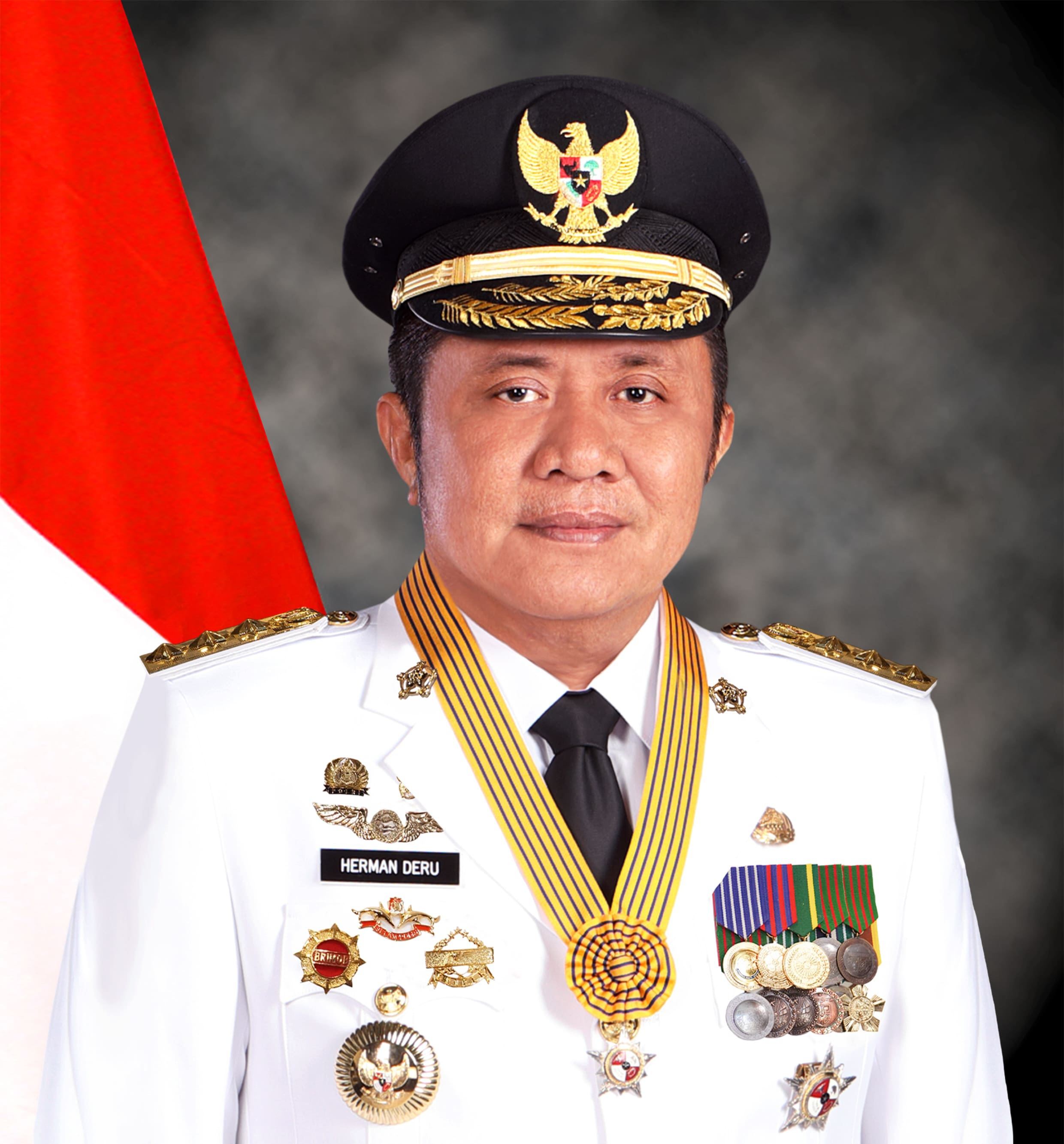

16th Governor of South Sumatra
- Incumbent
- Assumed office 20 February 2025
- Deputy: Cik Ujang
- Preceded by: Elen Setiadi (acting)
- In office 1 October 2018 – 1 October 2023
- Deputy: Mawardi Yahya
- Preceded by: Alex Noerdin
- Succeeded by: Agus Fatoni (acting)

Regent of East Ogan Komering Ulu
- In office 23 August 2005 – 23 August 2015
- Deputy: Kholid Mawardi
- Preceded by: Sujiadi
- Succeeded by: Kholid Mawardi

Personal details
- Born: 17 November 1967 (age 58) Belitang, South Sumatra
- Spouse: Febrita Lusita
- Children: 4, including Percha Leanpuri
- Education: Sjahyakirti University; STIE Trisna Negara Belitang
- Website: hermanderu.id

Herman Deru (born 17 November 1967) is an Indonesian politician who is the governor of South Sumatra, serving since February 2025 after his first term in 2018–2023. He was formerly Regent of East Ogan Komering Ulu between 2005 and 2015.

He worked as a civil servant for 11 years before entering politics, becoming a two-term regent for his home regency. He then went on to win the 2018 gubernatorial election and was reelected in 2024.

== Early life and education ==
Herman Deru is part of the Komering clan, which is native to areas of South Sumatra. He was born in the town of Belitang in East Ogan Komering Ulu Regency on 17 November 1967. Completing his primary (1979) and junior high school (1982) there, he would later graduate from Palembang State Senior High School 3 (SMA Negeri 3 Palembang) in 1985.

Later, as he worked, he would continue to study law in Sjahyakirti University in Palembang, getting his bachelor's degree in 1995. After he became regent, he would continue to study for his masters as well, obtaining a master's degree in management from Trisna Negara Belitang Economic Institute (STIE Trisna Negara Belitang) in 2008.

== Career ==
After completing his high school, he was briefly self-employed before he became a civil servant in 1987. He would work for the provincial government for 11 years, before he resigned in 1998 and returned to his business.

=== Regent (2005-2015) ===
In 2005, he participated in East OKU's first regent election and won. He was sworn in on 23 August 2005. In his first year of tenure, the poverty level was reduced from 12.81 to 10 percent. He was reelected in 2010, winning 94.86 percent of the votes and breaking the national record for the biggest victory in a local election.

During his second term, he tried to run for governor, challenging incumbent Alex Noerdin in the 2013 election. The initial results were challenged and a revote was held. However, he would lose to Noerdin, winning 1,389,169 votes to Noerdin's 1,447,799. His second term ended on 23 August 2015. Within his tenure, he received a total of 29 awards including the Satyalencana Wirakarya medal.

=== Governor ===
In 2018, Deru decided to run once more for governorship, with Alex Noerdin ineligible for a third term. Backed by PAN, Nasdem and Hanura, he and his running mate Mawardi Yahya won 1,394,438 votes (35.96%), defeating 3 other pairs. He was sworn in on 1 October 2018.

In 2024, Deru and his running mate Cik Ujang ran for re-election, winning 2,220,437 votes (51.62%) against two other candidates.

== Personal life and family ==
He married Febrita Lustia in 1985, at the age of 17 as he graduated from high school. Febrita's father, Husni, had served as Mayor of Palembang between 1993 and 2003. The couple has four children. Deru's daughter, Ratu Tenny Leriva, was elected as a senator in the 2024 election representing South Sumatra. His younger brother Bertu Merlas has been elected as a member of the national House of Representatives in 2014, 2019, and 2024.

== Honours ==
- Bintang Jasa Pratama (Star of Service, 2nd Class) - (2009)
- Satyalencana Wira Karya (Medal for Providing an Example of Meritorious Personality) - (2009)
- Satyalancana Pembangunan (Medal for Contributing in the National Development) - (2007)
- Manggala Karya Kencana (Medal of National Population and Family Planning) - (2007)
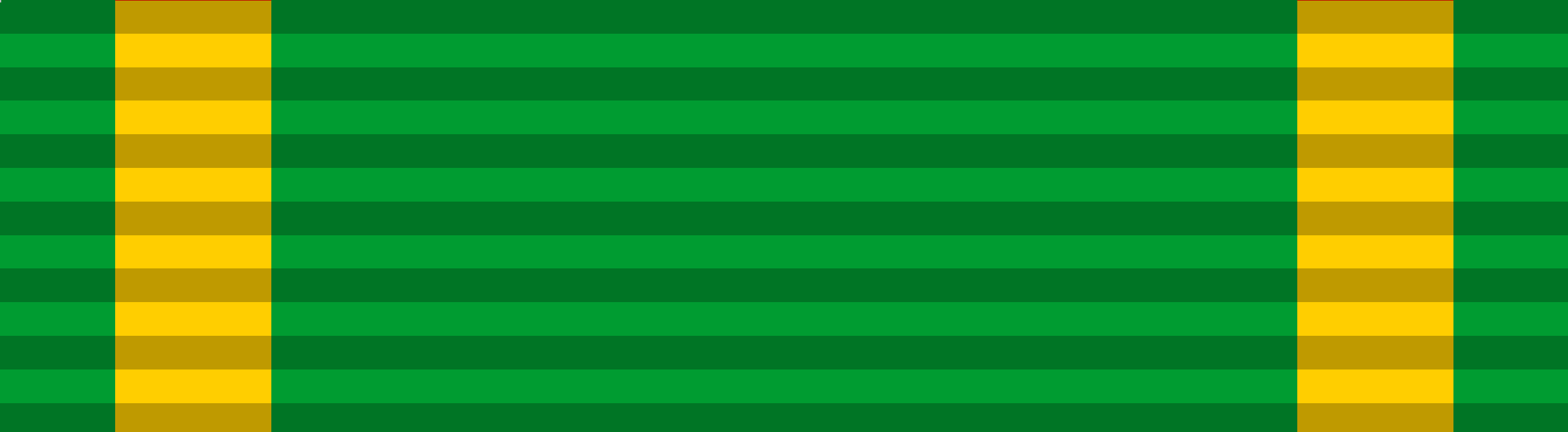
- Lencana Emas Jasa Bakti Koperasi dan Usaha Kecil dan Menengah (Gold Badge of Service for Cooperatives and Small and Medium Enterprises)
- Lencana Karya Bakti Satuan Polisi Pamong Praja (Medal of the Community Service of the Civil Service Police Unit) - (2019)
- Lencana Melati (Badge of Melati)
- Lencana Darma Bakti (Badge of Darma Melati) - (2019)
