= Alex Noerdin =

Indonesian politician (1950–2026)

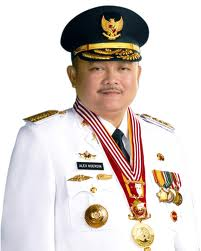

15th Governor of South Sumatra
- In office 7 November 2008 – 21 September 2018
- Preceded by: Mahyuddin N. S.
- Succeeded by: Herman Deru

Personal details
- Born: 9 September 1950 Palembang, South Sumatra, Indonesia
- Died: 25 February 2026 (aged 75) Jakarta, Indonesia
- Party: Golkar
- Spouse: Eliza Alex
- Children: 3

Alex Noerdin (9 September 1950 – 25 February 2026) was an Indonesian politician who was Governor of South Sumatra between 2008 and 2018.

Noerdin was born in Palembang, South Sumatra on 9 September 1950. He served as regent in Banyuasin for two consecutive terms (2001–2006 and 2007–2012). On 14 June 2008, in the second term, he resigned to be a candidate to be governor of South Sumatra in the local elections for the 2008 to 2013 period.

He became governor on 7 November 2008. His second term ended slightly earlier than scheduled on 21 September 2018, and he was replaced by Herman Deru.

== Corruption case ==
On 16 September 2021, Alex Noerdin was named a suspect for his involvement in purchasing of natural gas by Perusahaan Daerah Pertambangan dan Energi (PD PDE) Sumatera Selatan from 2010 to 2019. The loss caused to the state is approximately 30 million US dollars.

A week later on 22 September 2021, Alex Noerdin was named a suspect in a corruption case for the construction of Palembang Sriwijaya Mosque. The losses caused by the corruption amount to 130 billion rupiah. Alex Noerdin was named a suspect in two corruption cases when he was appointed a DPR member for the 2019–2024 term.

On 25 May 2022, Alex was given the maximum prison time amounting to 20 years in prison and fined 1 billion rupiah. This was reduced on 16 June 2022 from 20 years to 12 years in prison.

The sentence was further reduced into becoming 9 years of prison in September 2022.

== Death ==
Noerdin died on 25 February 2026, at the age of 75.

== Honours ==
=== National ===
- Indonesia:
  - Star of Mahaputera, 3rd Class (Bintang Mahaputera Utama)(11 August 2014)

=== Foreign ===
- Malaysia
  - Malacca
    - Grand Commander of the Exalted Order of Malacca (DGSM) – Datuk Seri (2012)
