= Indonesian Toll Road System =

Indonesian Toll Road System Sistem Jalan Tol Indonesia
- Toll road sign (left) and number shield example (right)

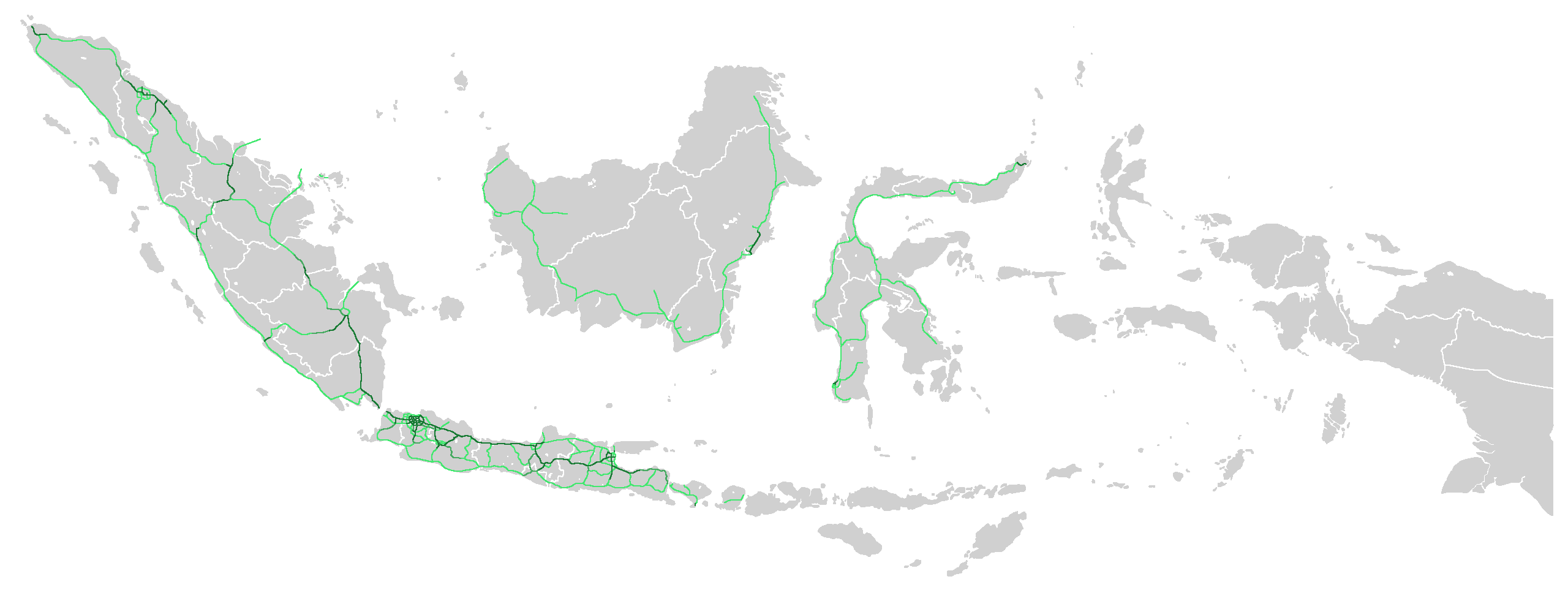

System information
- Maintained by various companies under concession from the Ministry of Public Works
- Length: 3,115 km (1,936 mi)
- Formed: 1978

Highway names
- Sumatra: Trans-Sumatra Toll Road
- Java: Trans-Java Toll Road
- Bali: Bali Mandara Toll Road
- Kalimantan: Balikpapan-Samarinda Toll Road
- Sulawesi: Manado-Bitung Toll Road; Makassar toll roads

System links
- Transport in Indonesia

The Indonesian Toll Road System (Indonesian: Sistem Jalan Tol Indonesia) is a network of controlled-access highways that forms a key component of the country's national road infrastructure. Managed under a combination of public and private sector arrangements, the system facilitates faster and more efficient travel across major islands, particularly Java and Sumatra.

Toll roads in Indonesia are overseen by the Toll Road Regulatory Agency (Badan Pengatur Jalan Tol or BPJT), under the Ministry of Public Works and Housing (Kementerian Pekerjaan Umum), and are primarily operated by state-owned enterprises, mainly Jasa Marga, Hutama Karya, Waskita Toll Road, and various private companies like Citra Marga Nusaphala Persada and Astra Infra.

During the presidency of Joko Widodo from 2014 to 2024, Indonesia experienced a substantial expansion of its toll road network. Infrastructure development was a prominent focus of his administration, and by the end of his tenure, 72.7% of the country's operational toll roads had been constructed during this period. The expansion was part of a broader effort to enhance national connectivity and support economic development.

== Lists ==
This is a list of toll roads in Indonesia grouped per province. Partially opened, under-construction, and proposed toll roads are listed in italics.

Island	Province	Toll Road name	Length (km)	Operator
Sumatra Trans-Sumatra Toll Road	Aceh	Sigli–Banda Aceh Toll Road	49.8 (operational), 74 (total)	Hutama Karya
Sumatra Trans-Sumatra Toll Road	North Sumatra	Medan–Binjai Toll Road	16.8	Hutama Karya
Sumatra Trans-Sumatra Toll Road	North Sumatra	Binjai–Langsa Toll Road	11.8 (operational), 130.9 (total)	Hutama Karya
Sumatra Trans-Sumatra Toll Road	North Sumatra	Belawan–Tanjung Morawa Toll Road	34.4	Jasa Marga
Sumatra Trans-Sumatra Toll Road	North Sumatra	Medan–Kuala Namu–Tebing Tinggi Toll Road	61.8	Jasamarga Kualanamu Tol
Sumatra Trans-Sumatra Toll Road	Riau	Pekanbaru–Dumai Toll Road	131.5	Hutama Karya
Sumatra Trans-Sumatra Toll Road	West Sumatra	Padang–Pekanbaru Toll Road	38 (operational), 255 (total)	Hutama Karya
Sumatra Trans-Sumatra Toll Road	Bengkulu	Bengkulu–Lubuk Linggau Toll Road	18 (operational), 95 (total)	Hutama Karya
Sumatra Trans-Sumatra Toll Road	South Sumatra	Kayu Agung–Palembang–Betung Toll Road	42.5 (operational), 111.7 (total)	Waskita Sriwijaya Tol
Sumatra Trans-Sumatra Toll Road	South Sumatra	Palembang–Indralaya Toll Road	22.0	Hutama Karya
Sumatra Trans-Sumatra Toll Road	Lampung	Bakauheni–Terbanggi Besar Toll Road	140.9	Hutama Karya
Sumatra Trans-Sumatra Toll Road	Lampung	Terbanggi Besar–Pematang Panggang–Kayuagung Toll Road	189	Hutama Karya
Java Trans-Java Toll Road	Greater Jakarta	Prof. Dr. Ir. Soedijatmo Toll Road	14	Jasa Marga
Java Trans-Java Toll Road	Greater Jakarta	Jakarta–Tangerang Toll Road	27	Jasa Marga
Java Trans-Java Toll Road	Greater Jakarta	Jakarta–Serpong Toll Road	12	Jasa Marga (Ulujami–Pondok Aren) Bintaro Serpong Damai (Ulujami–Pondok Aren)
Java Trans-Java Toll Road	Greater Jakarta	Depok–Antasari Toll Road	15.7 (operational), 23 (total)	Citra Waspphutowa
Java Trans-Java Toll Road	Greater Jakarta	Jakarta–Bogor–Ciawi Toll Road	47	Jasa Marga
Java Trans-Java Toll Road	Greater Jakarta	Jakarta–Cikampek Toll Road	72	Jasa Marga
Java Trans-Java Toll Road	Greater Jakarta	Jakarta Inner Ring Road	46	Jasa Marga (Pluit–Cawang) Citra Marga Nusaphala Persada (Cawang–Tanjung Priok–Pluit)
Java Trans-Java Toll Road	Greater Jakarta	Jakarta Outer Ring Road	65	Jakarta Lingkar Barat Satu (Penjaringan–Kembangan) (W1) Marga Lingkar Jakarta (Kembangan–Ulujami) (W2) Jasa Marga (Ulujami–Pondok Pinang) (W3) Hutama Karya (Ciputat–TMII) (S) Jasa Marga (TMII–Cikunir–Cilincing) (E1–E2–E3) Hutama Karya (Tanjung Priok Access Toll Road) (N)
Java Trans-Java Toll Road	Greater Jakarta	Jakarta Inner Ring Road 2 (6 Inner City Toll Roads)	9.44 (operational), 69.77 (total)	Jakarta Toll Road Development (Sunter–Kelapa Gading–Pulogebang) (Semanan–Grogol–Sunter) (Duri Pulo–Kampung Melayu) (Kampung Melayu–Kemayoran) (Ulujami–Tanah Abang) (Pasar Minggu–Casablanca Toll Road)
Java Trans-Java Toll Road	Greater Jakarta	Jakarta Outer Ring Road 2	110.4	Jasamarga Kunciran Cengkareng (Cengkareng–Kunciran) Marga Trans Nusantara (Kunciran–Serpong) Cinere Serpong Jaya (Serpong–Pamulang) Translingkar Kita Jaya (Cinere–Jagorawi) Cimanggis Cibitung Tollways (Cimanggis–Cibitung) Cibitung Tanjung Priok Port Tollways (Cibitung–Cilincing)
Java Trans-Java Toll Road	Greater Jakarta	Jakarta Outer Ring Road 3	283.71 (estimation)	Duta Graha Karya (Kamal–Teluk Naga–Rajeg) Djarum (Semanan–Balaraja) Trans Bumi Serbaraja (Serpong–Balaraja) tba (Serpong–Bitung–Batu Ceper) Persada Utama Infra (Bogor–Serpong via Parung) Marga Sarana Jabar [BORR (Bogor Outer Ring Road)] Persada Utama Infra (Sentul–Karawang Barat) tba (Karawang Barat–Babelan) tba (Babelan–Pulogebang)
Java Trans-Java Toll Road	Greater Jakarta	Bekasi–Cawang–Kampung Melayu Toll Road	21.49 (operational), 33,89 (total)	Kresna Kusuma Dyandra Marga
Java Trans-Java Toll Road	Greater Jakarta	Jakarta–Cikampek Elevated Toll Road	36.4	Jasamarga Jalan layang Cikampek
Java Trans-Java Toll Road	Greater Jakarta	Jakarta Harbour Road 2 (Tanjung Priok–Ancol Timur–Pluit) Toll Road	9.60 (under construction)	Citra Marga Nusaphala Persada
Java Trans-Java Toll Road	Greater Jakarta	Jakarta–Cikampek 2 South Toll Road	62 (under construction)	Jasamarga Japek Selatan
Java Trans-Java Toll Road	Greater Jakarta	Bogor Ring Road Toll Road	8.5 (operational), 13 (total)	Marga Sarana Jabar
Java Trans-Java Toll Road	Banten	Tangerang–Merak Toll Road	73	Marga Mandala Sakti
Java Trans-Java Toll Road	Banten	Serang–Panimbang Toll Road	26.5 (operational), 83.5 (total)	Wijaya Karya Serang Panimbang
Java Trans-Java Toll Road	West Java (exclude Bogor, Depok, and Bekasi)	Cikampek–Purwakarta–Padalarang Toll Road	58.3	Jasa Marga
Java Trans-Java Toll Road	West Java (exclude Bogor, Depok, and Bekasi)	Padalarang–Cileunyi Toll Road	36	Jasa Marga
Java Trans-Java Toll Road	West Java (exclude Bogor, Depok, and Bekasi)	Cileunyi–Sumedang–Dawuan Toll Road	62.6	Citra Karya Jabar
Java Trans-Java Toll Road	West Java (exclude Bogor, Depok, and Bekasi)	Soreang–Pasir Koja Toll Road	10.6	Citra Marga Lintas Jabar
Java Trans-Java Toll Road	West Java (exclude Bogor, Depok, and Bekasi)	Cikopo–Palimanan Toll Road	116.75	Lintas Marga Sedaya
Java Trans-Java Toll Road	West Java (exclude Bogor, Depok, and Bekasi)	Palimanan–Kanci Toll Road	26	Jasa Marga
Java Trans-Java Toll Road	West Java (exclude Bogor, Depok, and Bekasi)	Kanci–Pejagan Toll Road	35	Semesta Marga Raya
Java Trans-Java Toll Road	West Java (exclude Bogor, Depok, and Bekasi)	Ciawi–Sukabumi	27.3 (operational), 53.6 (total)	Trans Jabar Tol
Java Trans-Java Toll Road	West Java (exclude Bogor, Depok, and Bekasi)	Gedebage–Tasikmalaya–Cilacap	206.65 (in preparation)	tba
Java Trans-Java Toll Road	Central Java & Yogyakarta	Pejagan-Pemalang Toll Road	57.5	Pejagan Pemalang Toll Road
Java Trans-Java Toll Road	Central Java & Yogyakarta	Pemalang-Batang Toll Road	39	Pemalang Batang Toll Road
Java Trans-Java Toll Road	Central Java & Yogyakarta	Batang-Semarang Toll Road	75	Jasamarga Semarang Batang
Java Trans-Java Toll Road	Central Java & Yogyakarta	Semarang ABC Toll Road	25	Jasa Marga
Java Trans-Java Toll Road	Central Java & Yogyakarta	Semarang–Demak Toll Road	16,01 (operational) 24.74 (total)	PP Semarang Demak
Java Trans-Java Toll Road	Central Java & Yogyakarta	Demak–Tuban Toll Road	176.99 (in preparation)	tba
Java Trans-Java Toll Road	Central Java & Yogyakarta	Harbour Toll Road Semarang (Semarang–Kendal)	20,86 (in preparation)	tba
Java Trans-Java Toll Road	Central Java & Yogyakarta	Semarang–Solo Toll Road	72.68	Trans Marga Jateng
Java Trans-Java Toll Road	Central Java & Yogyakarta	Solo–Ngawi Toll Road	90.43	Jasamarga Solo Ngawi
Java Trans-Java Toll Road	Central Java & Yogyakarta	Yogyakarta–Solo Toll Road	58.01 (under construction)	Jasamarga Jogja Solo
Java Trans-Java Toll Road	Central Java & Yogyakarta	Yogyakarta–Sleman–YIA Kulonprogo Toll Road	35.74 (in preparation)	Jasamarga Jogja Solo
Java Trans-Java Toll Road	Central Java & Yogyakarta	Yogyakarta–Bawen Toll Road	75.82 (under construction)	Jasa Marga Jogja Bawen
Java Trans-Java Toll Road	Central Java & Yogyakarta	Pejagan/Tegal–Cilacap Toll Road	141 (in preparation)	tba
Java Trans-Java Toll Road	Central Java & Yogyakarta	Cilacap–Yogyakarta Toll Road	167.07 (in preparation)	tba
Java Trans-Java Toll Road	East Java	Krian–Legundi–Bunder–Manyar Toll Road	29 (operational), 38 (total)	Waskita Bumi Wira
Java Trans-Java Toll Road	East Java	Waru-Juanda Toll Road	13	Citra Margatama Surabaya
Java Trans-Java Toll Road	East Java	Surabaya–Mojokerto Toll Road	36.27	Jasamarga Surabaya Mojokerto
Java Trans-Java Toll Road	East Java	Jombang–Mojokerto Toll Road	40.5	Astra Tol Nusantara
Java Trans-Java Toll Road	East Java	Ngawi–Kertosono Toll Road	87	Jasamarga Ngawi Kertosono Kediri
Java Trans-Java Toll Road	East Java	Surabaya–Gresik Toll Road	21	Margabumi Matraraya
Java Trans-Java Toll Road	East Java	Surabaya–Gempol Toll Road	43	Jasa Marga
Java Trans-Java Toll Road	East Java	Gempol–Pandaan Toll Road	14	Jasa Marga Pandaan Tol
Java Trans-Java Toll Road	East Java	Pandaan-Malang Toll Road	38.5	Jasamarga Pandaan Malang
Java Trans-Java Toll Road	East Java	Gempol–Pasuruan Toll Road	34.15	Jasamarga Gempol Pasuruan
Java Trans-Java Toll Road	East Java	Pasuruan–Probolinggo Toll Road	39.85	Trans-Jawa Paspro Jalan Tol
Java Trans-Java Toll Road	East Java	Probolinggo–Banyuwangi Toll Road	176.4 (under construction)	Jasamarga Probolinggo Banyuwangi (JPB)
Bali	Bali	Bali Mandara Toll Road	10	Jasamarga Bali Tol
Bali	Bali	Gilimanuk–Mengwi Toll Road	96,84 (in preparation)	tba
Kalimantan	East Kalimantan	Balikpapan–Samarinda Toll Road	99.3	Jasa Marga
Sulawesi	North Sulawesi	Manado–Bitung Toll Road	40	Jasamarga Manado Bitung
Sulawesi	South Sulawesi	Ir. Sutami Toll Road	12	Jalan Tol Seksi Empat
Sulawesi	South Sulawesi	Reformasi Toll Road	6	Bosowa Marga Nusantara
Sulawesi	South Sulawesi	Pettarani Elevated Toll Road	4.3	Bosowa Marga Nusantara

Source : BUJT

== Gallery ==
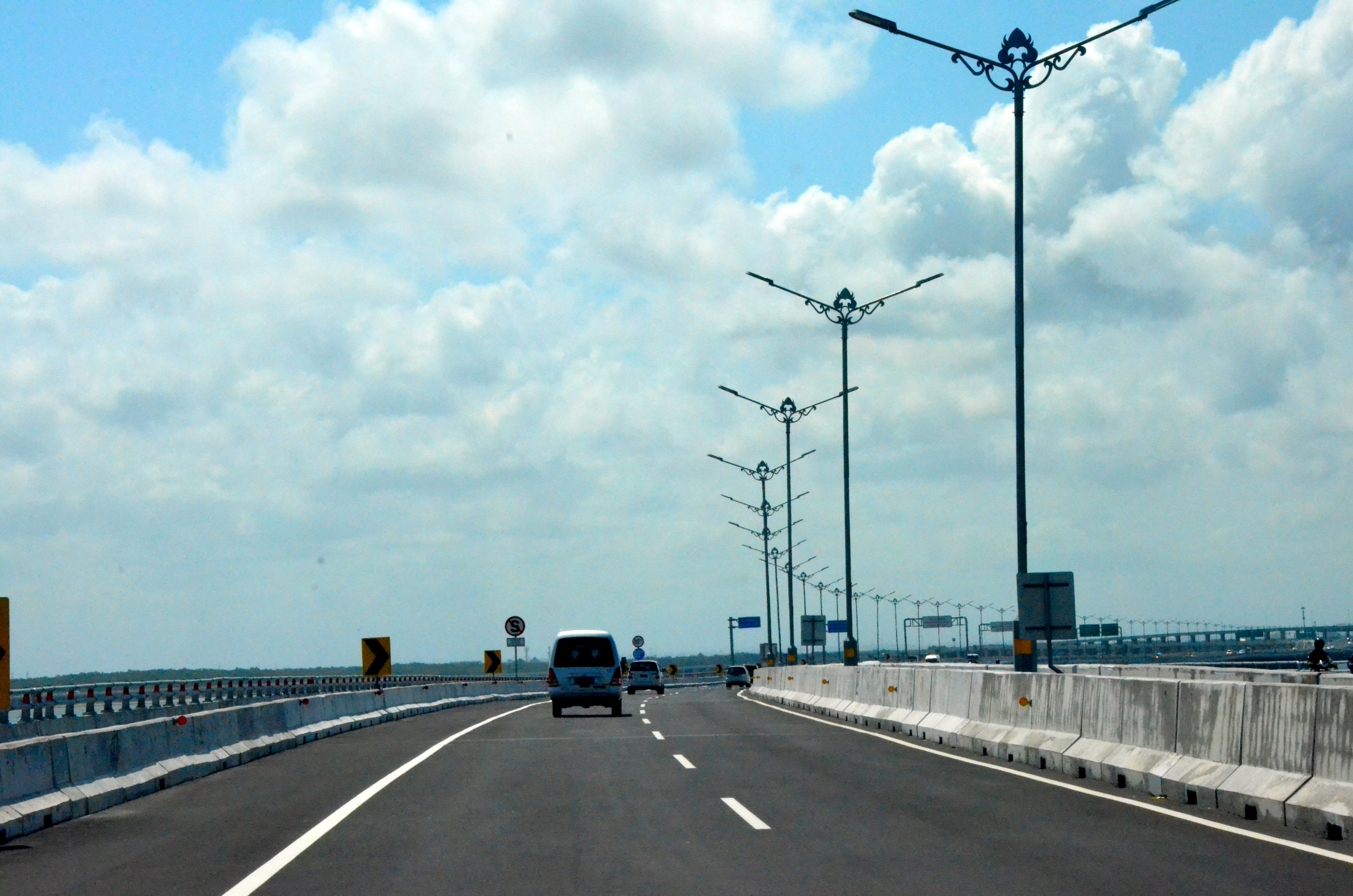
Bali Mandara Toll Road

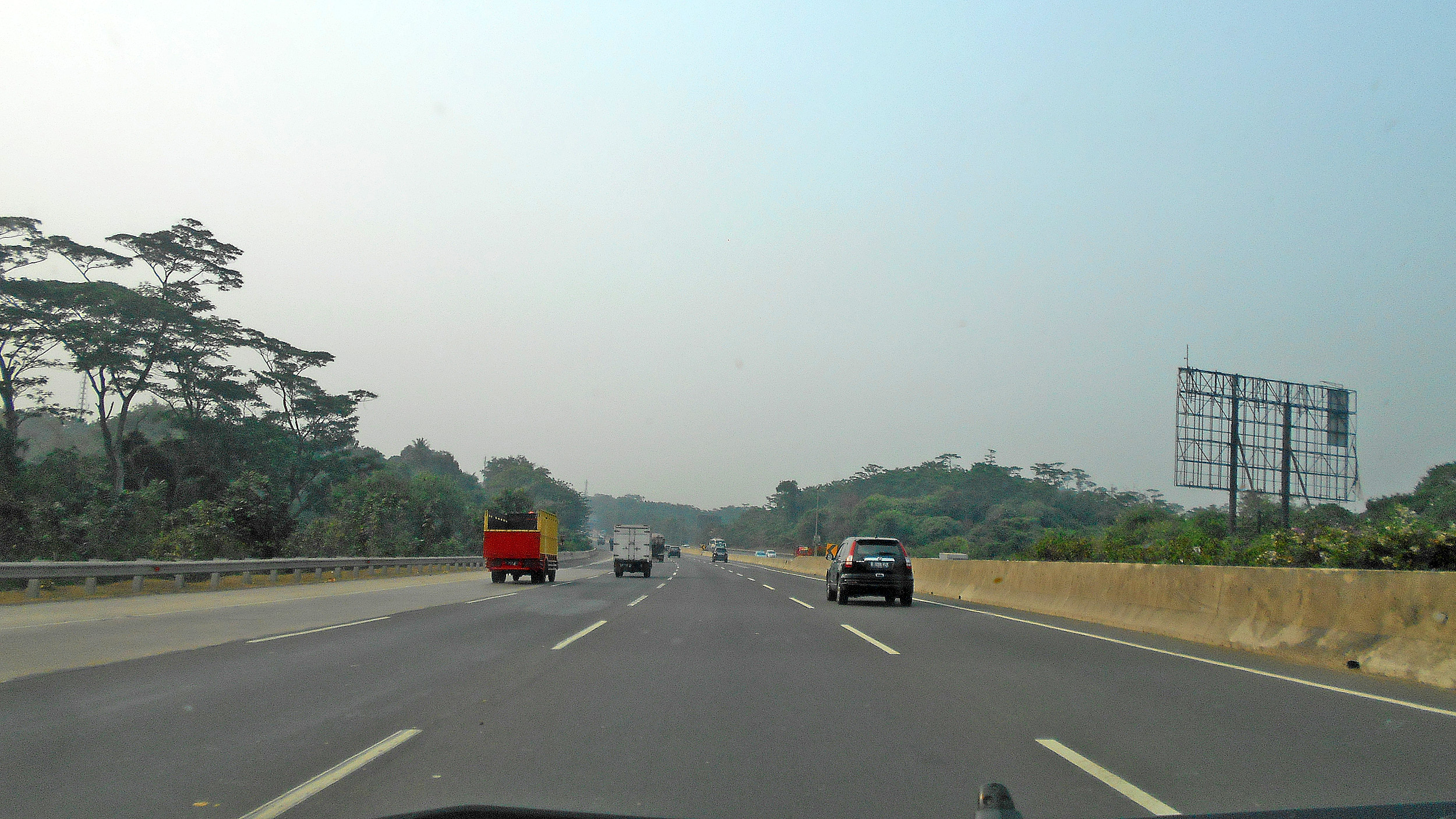
Jagorawi Toll Road

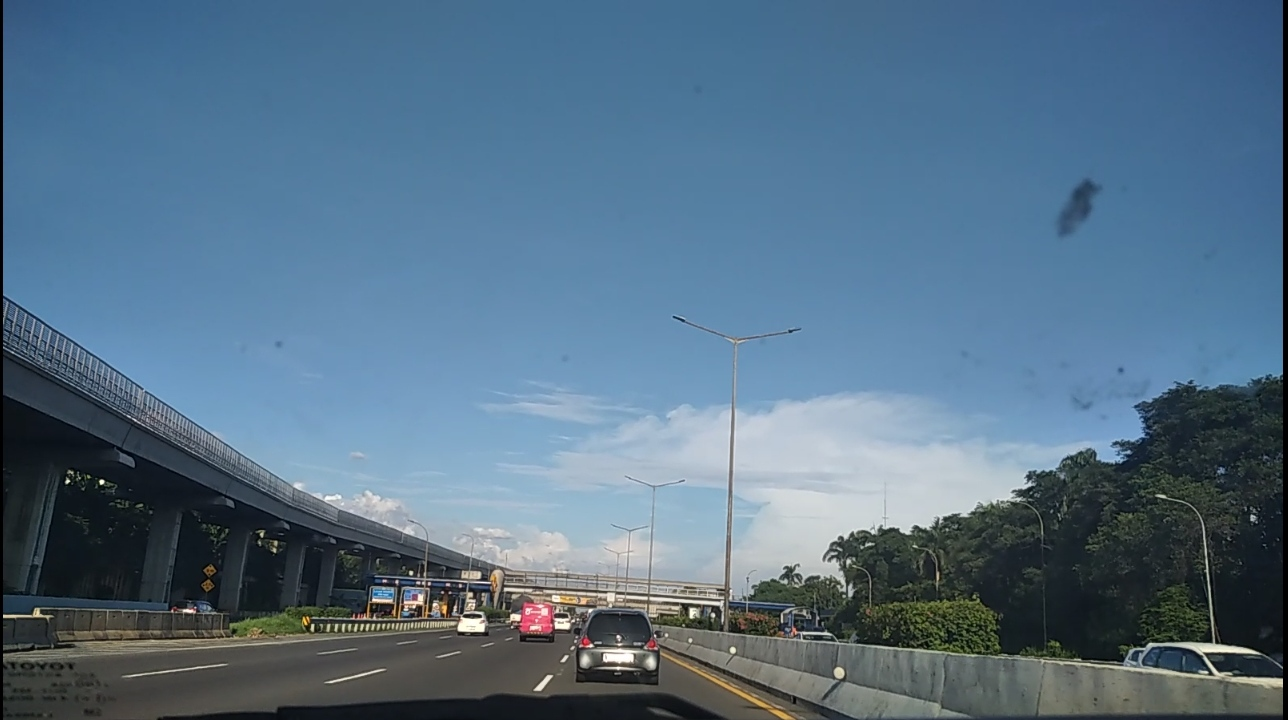
Jakarta-Cikampek toll road

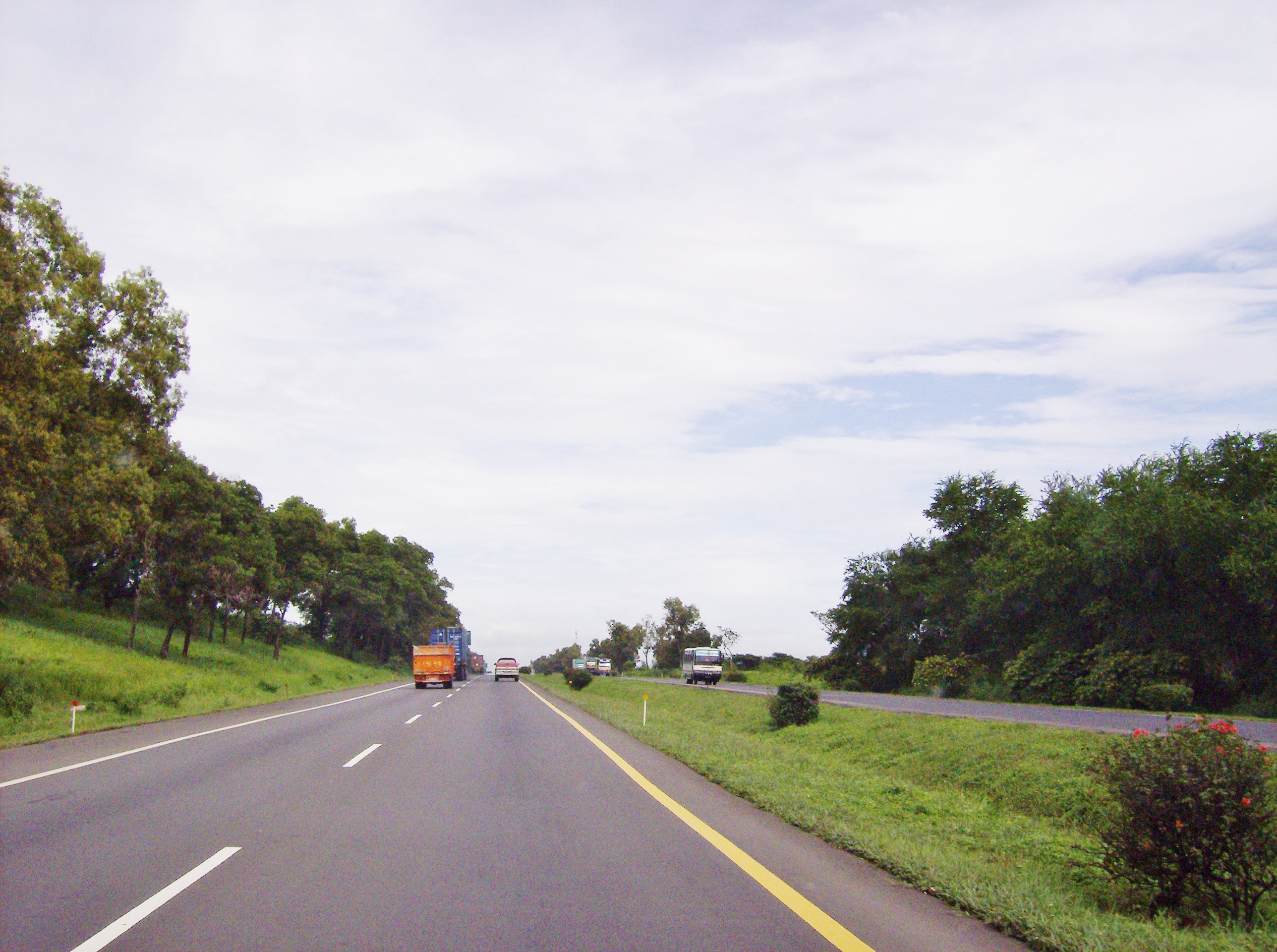
Jakarta-Cikampek toll road, before widening

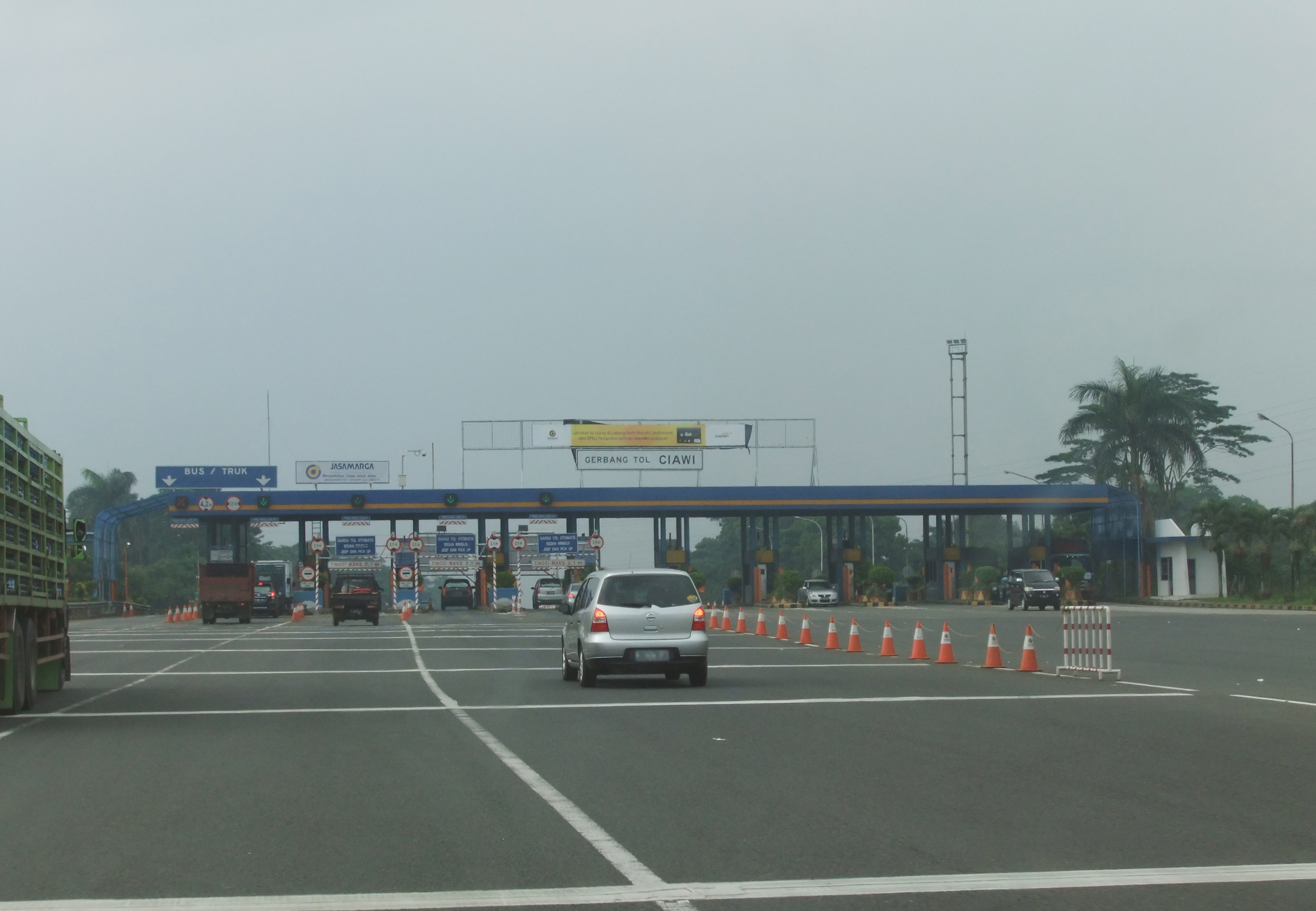
Ciawi toll plaza

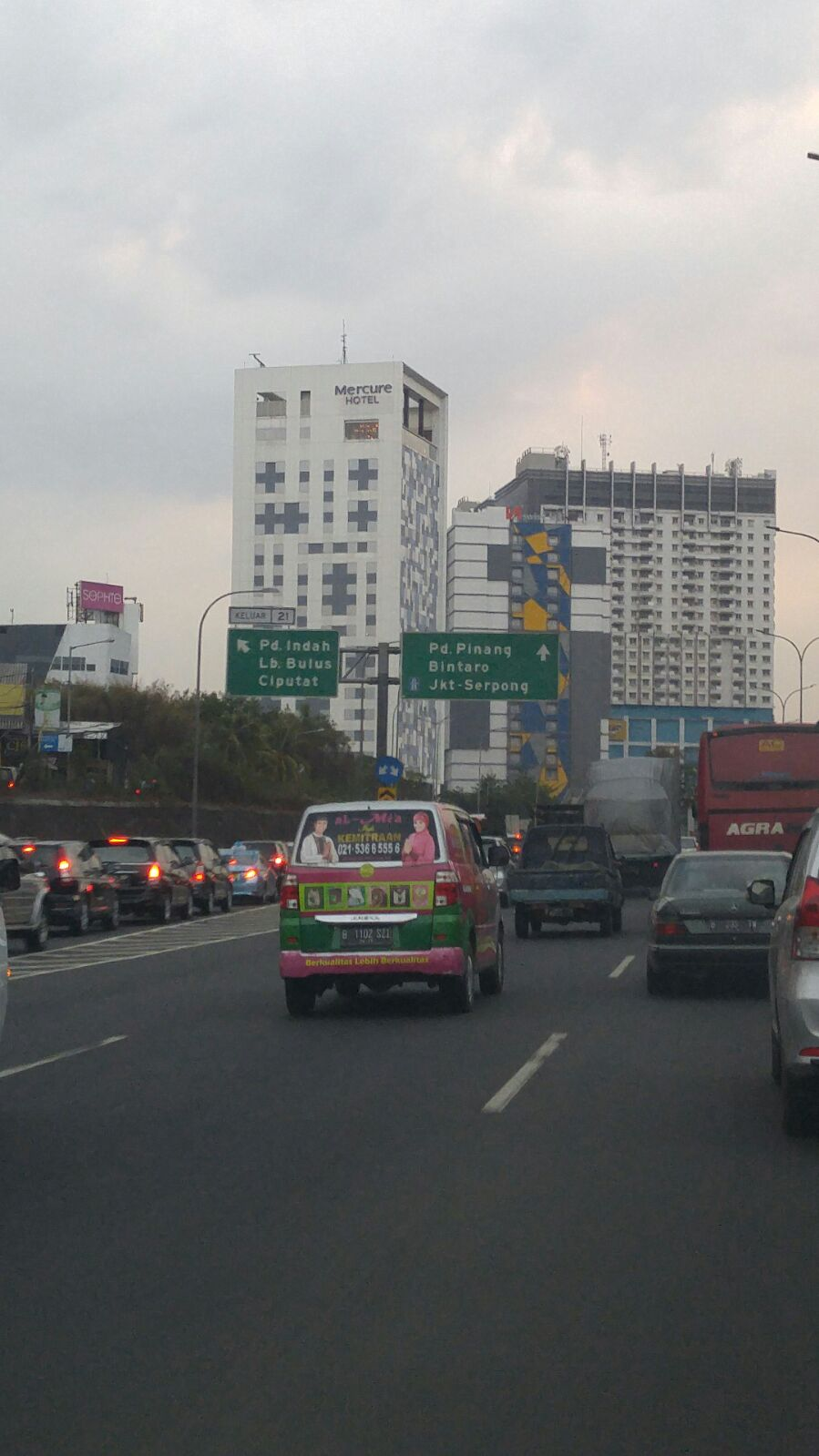
Jakarta Outer Ring Road

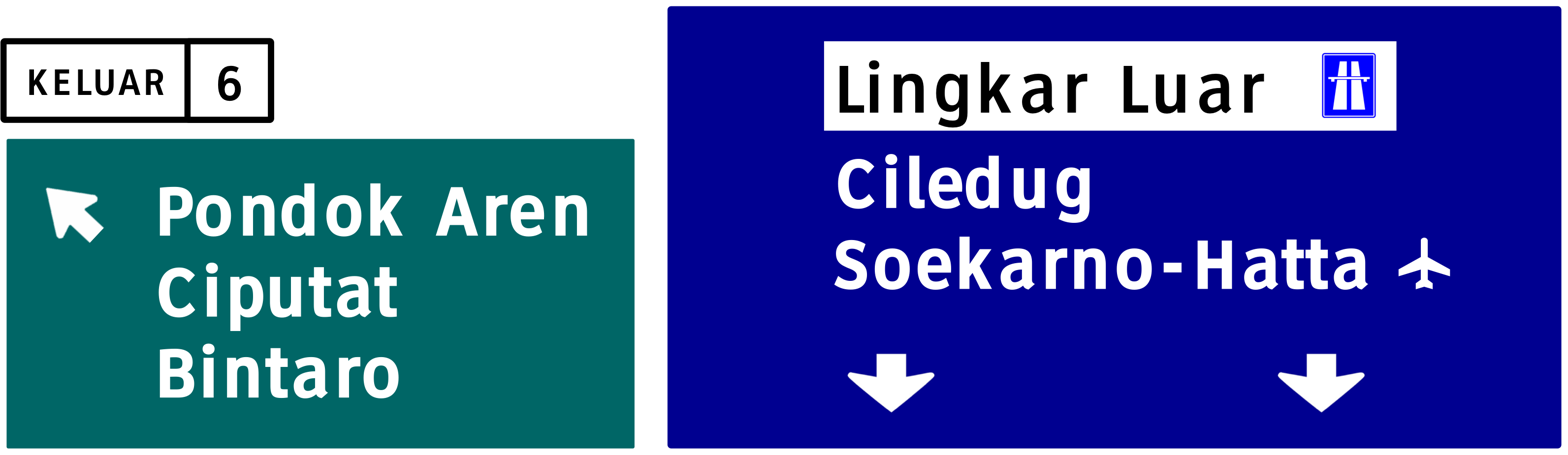
Toll road exit sign

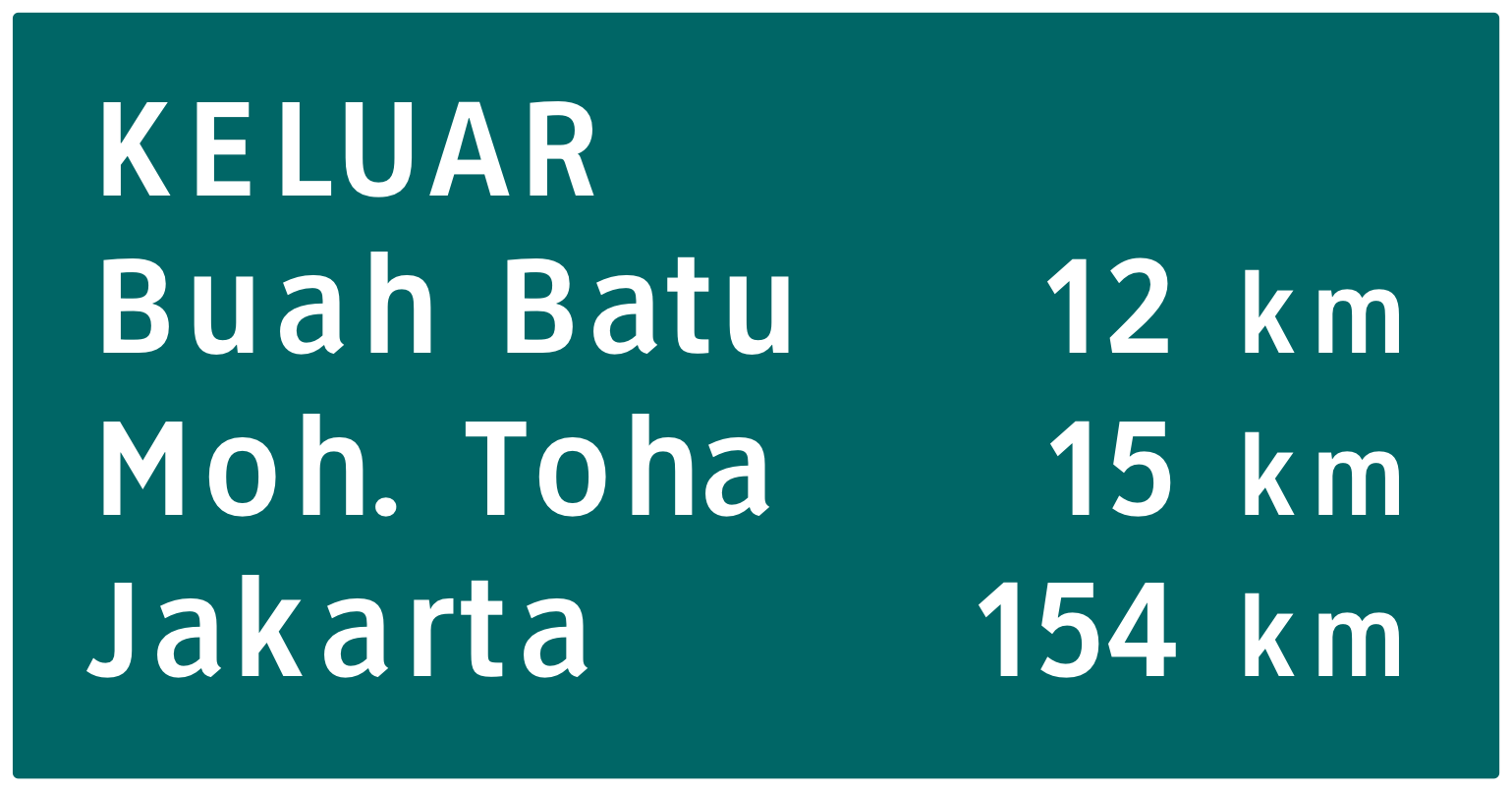
Toll road distance sign

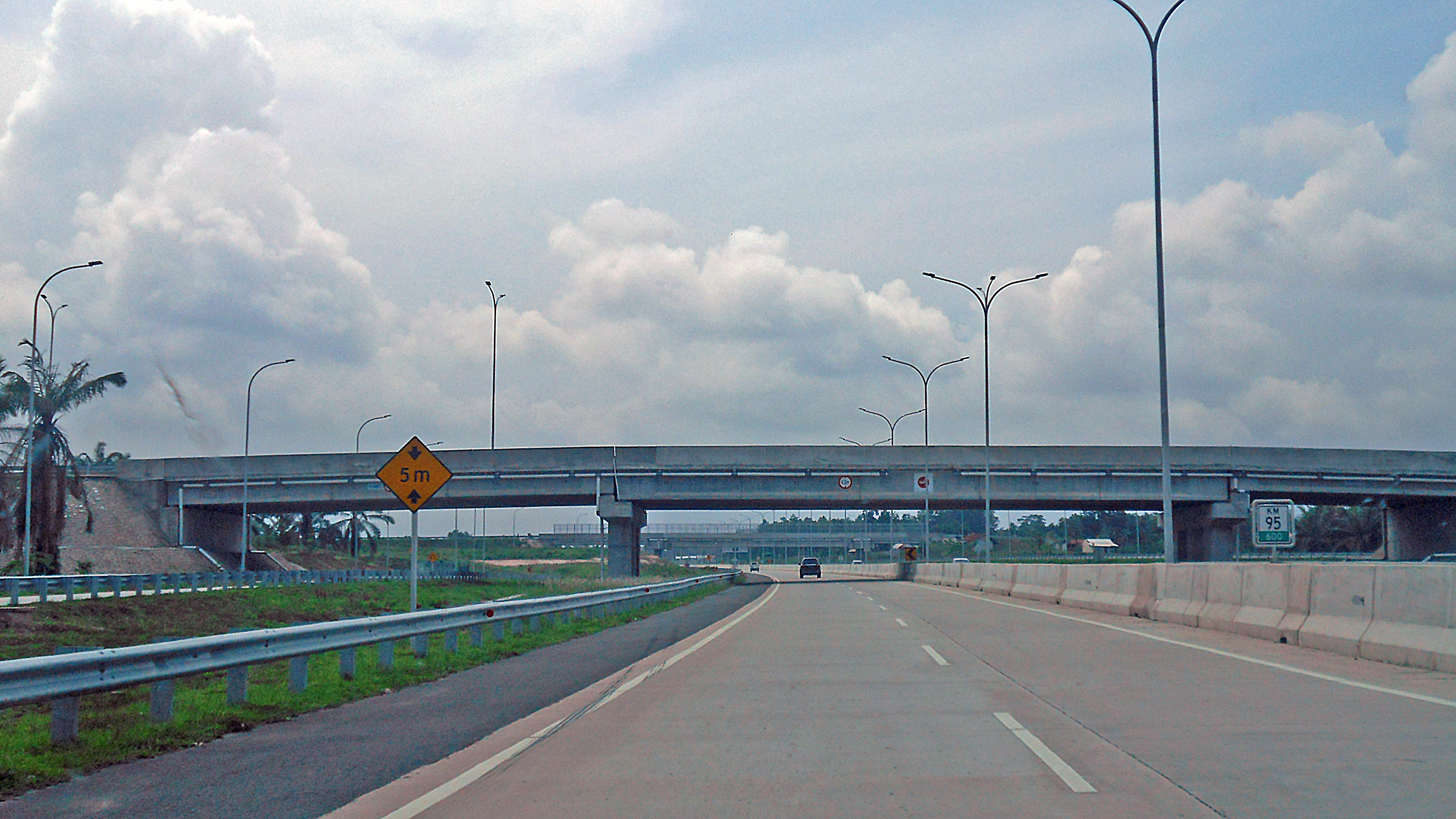
Bakauheni - Terbanggi Besar Toll Road

== See also ==
- Trans-Java Toll Road
- Trans-Sumatra Toll Road
