= Pematang Panggang–Kayuagung Toll Road =

Toll Road in Indonesia

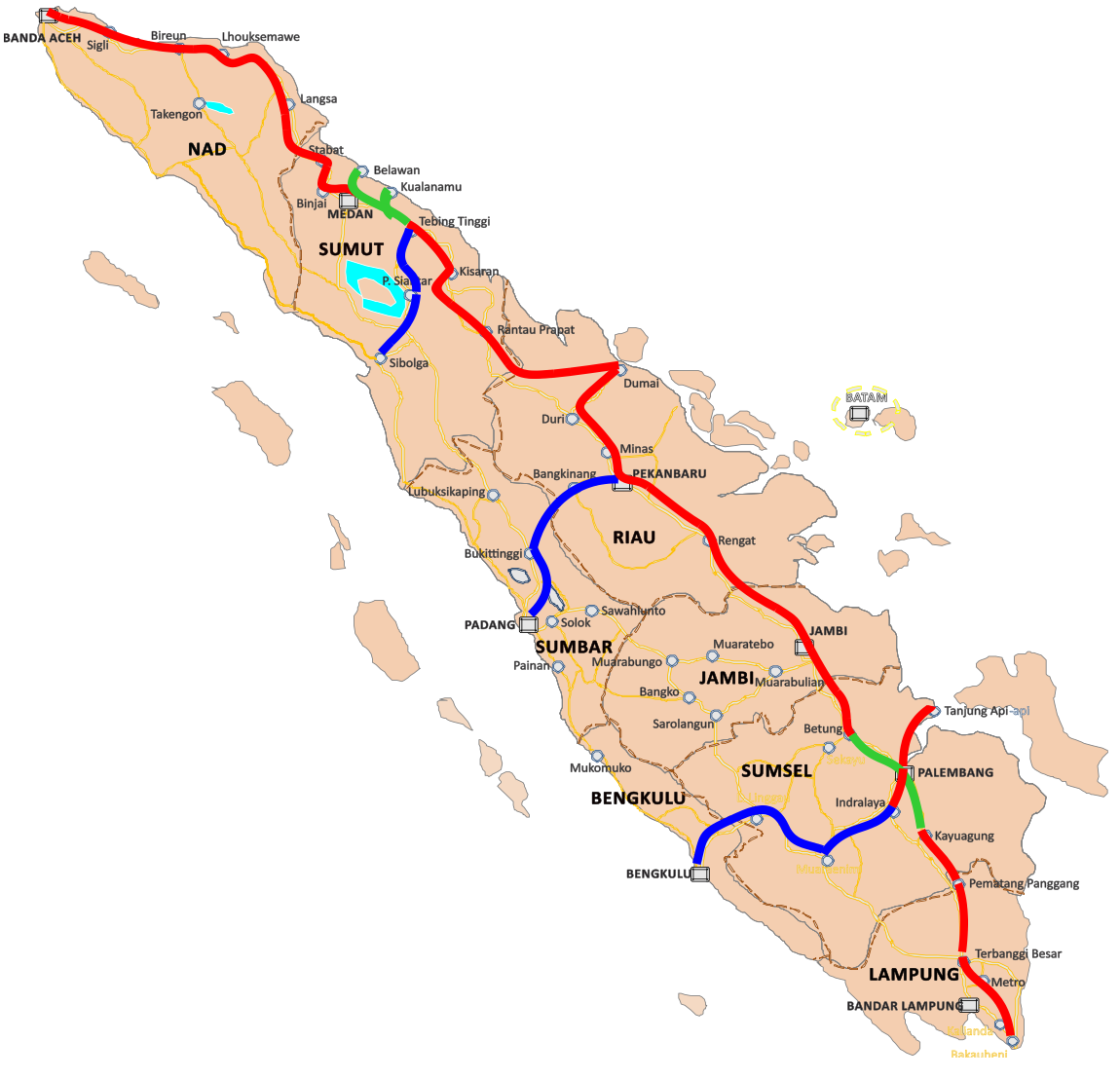

Route information
- Part of AH25
- Maintained by PT Hutama Karya (Persero)
- Length: 87 km (54 mi)
- Existed: 2019–present

Major junctions
- South end: Simpang Pematang
- Terbanggi Besar–Pematang Panggang Toll Road; Kayu Agung–Palembang–Betung Toll Road
- North end: Kayu Agung

Location
- Country: Indonesia
- Provinces: Lampung; South Sumatra
- Major cities: Mesuji Regency; Ogan Komering Ilir Regency

Highway system
- Transport in Indonesia

Pematang Panggang–Kayuagung Toll Road is an 87-kilometre-long (54 mi) toll road that connects Pematang Panggang to Kayuagung in the island of Sumatra, Indonesia. This toll road is part of a network of Trans-Sumatra Toll Road, and is a continuation of the Terbanggi Besar–Pematang Panggang Toll Road and it is connected to the Kayu Agung–Palembang–Betung Toll Road.

== Exits ==
Province	Location	km	mi	Exit	Name	Destinations	Notes
Lampung	Simpang Pematang, Mesuji Regency	239.6	148.9	Terbanggi Besar–Pematang Panggang Toll Road			
Lampung	Simpang Pematang, Mesuji Regency	240.2	149.3	239	Simpang Pematang Toll Gate	Simpang Pematang; Pematang Panggang; Mesuji	Southern terminus
South Sumatra	Kayu Agung, Ogan Komering Ilir Regency	329.1	204.5	329	Kayuagung Toll Gate	Kayu Agung; Indralaya	Northern terminus
South Sumatra	Kayu Agung, Ogan Komering Ilir Regency	330.0	205.1	Kayuagung Utama Toll Gate			
South Sumatra	Kayu Agung, Ogan Komering Ilir Regency	330.2	205.2	Kayu Agung–Palembang–Betung Toll Road			
1.000 mi = 1.609 km; 1.000 km = 0.621 mi: Electronic toll collection; Route transition
