= Terbanggi Besar–Pematang Panggang Toll Road =

Toll road in Indonesia

Terbanggi Besar–Pematang Panggang–Kayu Agung Toll Road
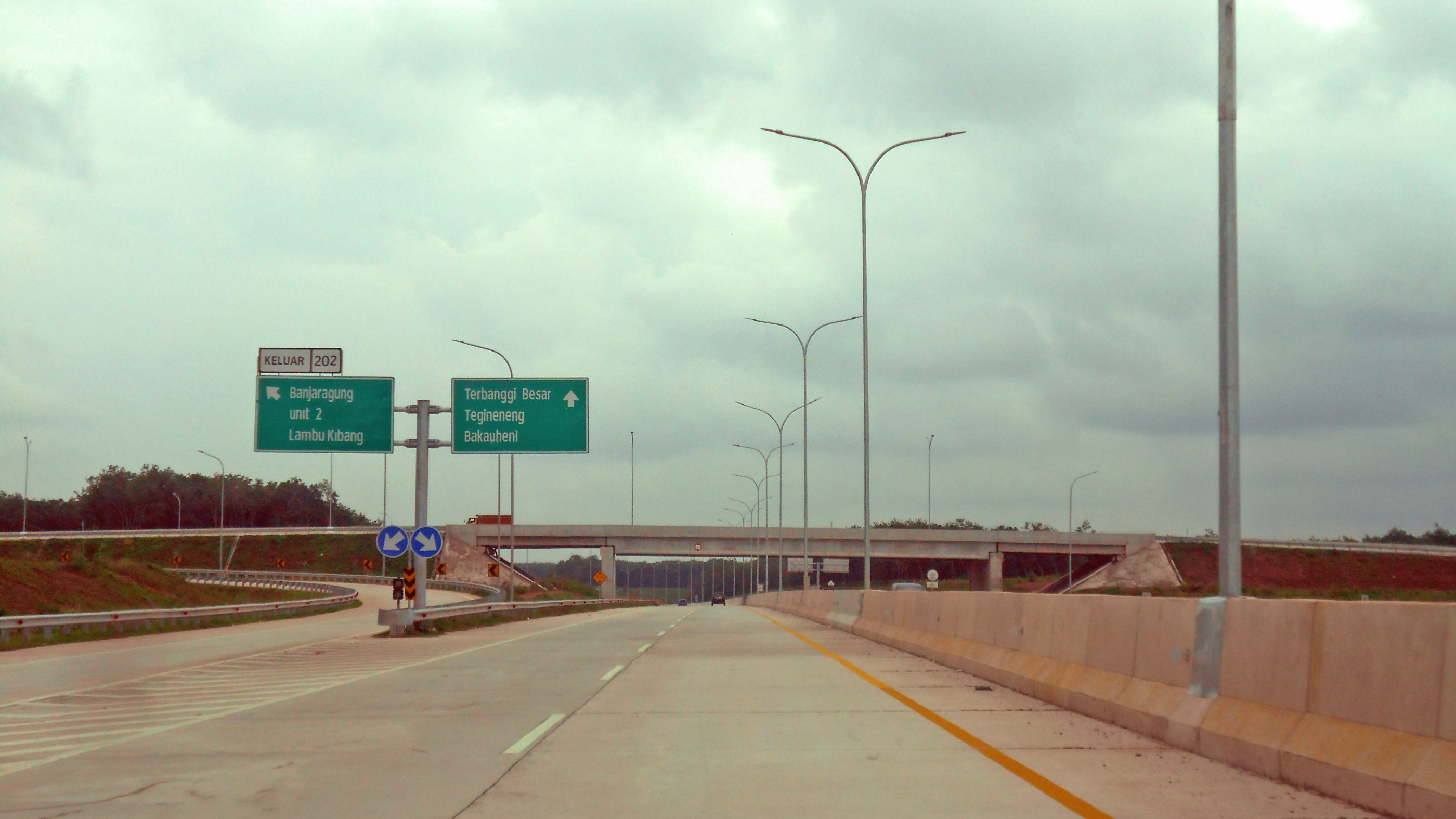
- Lambu Kibang interchange at Terpeka Toll Road

Route information
- Part of AH25
- Maintained by PT Hutama Karya (Persero)
- Length: 100 km (62 mi)
- Existed: 2019–present

Major junctions
- South end: Terbanggi Besar
- Bakauheni-Terbanggi Besar Toll Road; Pematang Panggang–Kayuagung Toll Road
- North end: Pematang Panggang

Location
- Country: Indonesia
- Provinces: Lampung
- Major cities: Central Lampung Regency; Tulang Bawang Regency; West Tulang Bawang Regency; Mesuji Regency

Highway system
- Transport in Indonesia

Terbanggi Besar–Pematang Panggang–Kayu Agung Toll Road, often abbreviated as Terpeka is a 189.2-kilometre-long (117.6 mi) controlled-access toll road that connects Terbanggi Besar, Pematang Panggang, and Kayu Agung in the island of Sumatra, Indonesia. This toll road is a network of Trans-Sumatra Toll Road, and connected to Bakauheni-Terbanggi Besar Toll Road and Kayu Agung–Palembang–Betung Toll Road.

== Exits ==
Province	Location	km	mi	Exit	Name	Destinations	Notes
Lampung	Terbanggi Besar, Central Lampung Regency	140.0	87.0	Bakauheni–Terbanggi Besar Toll Road			
Lampung	Terbanggi Besar, Central Lampung Regency	140.8	87.5	140	Terbanggi Besar Toll Gate	Terbanggi Besar; Bandar Jaya; Kotabumi	Southern terminus
Lampung	Terusan Nunyai, Central Lampung Regency	167.4	104.0	166	Gunung Batin Toll Gate	Gunung Batin	
Lampung	Menggala, Tulang Bawang Regency	183.7	114.1	184	Menggala Toll Gate	Panarangan; Menggala	
Lampung	Lambu Kibang, West Tulang Bawang Regency	201.8	125.4	202	Lambu Kibang Toll Gate	Banjaragung; Unit 2; Lambu Kibang	
Lampung	Way Serdang, West Tulang Bawang Regency	218.4	135.7	218	Way Kenanga Toll Gate	Way Kenanga; Way Serdang; Sp Asahan	
Lampung	Simpang Pematang, Mesuji Regency	239.6	148.9	239	Simpang Pematang Toll Gate	Pematang Panggang; Simpang Pematang; Mesuji	Northern terminus
Lampung	Simpang Pematang, Mesuji Regency	240.6	149.5	Pematang Panggang–Kayuagung Toll Road			
1.000 mi = 1.609 km; 1.000 km = 0.621 mi: Route transition

== See also ==
- Trans-Sumatra Toll Road
