= Bakauheni–Terbanggi Besar Toll Road =

Toll road in Indonesia

Bakauheni–Terbanggi Besar Toll Road Drs. H. M. Adeham M.Pd. Memorial Lampung Toll Road
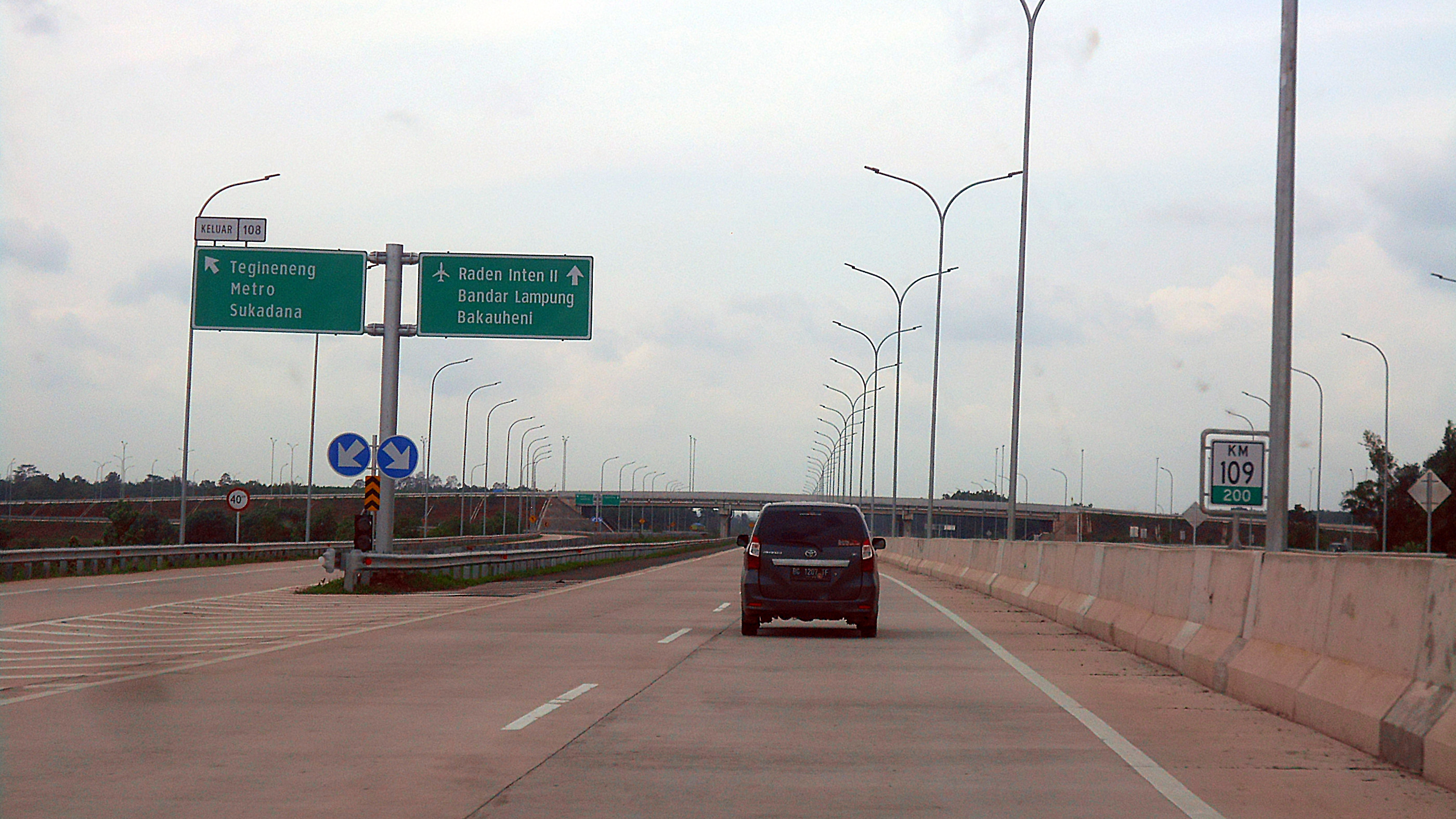
- Bakauheni–Terbanggi Besar Toll Road in December 2019

Route information
- Part of AH25
- Maintained by PT Hutama Karya (Persero) as part of a government-granted monopoly on the Trans-Sumatra Toll Road system
- Length: 140.98 km (87.60 mi)
- Existed: 2018–present

Major junctions
- South end: Port of Bakauheni
- Terbanggi Besar–Pematang Panggang Toll Road
- North end: Terbanggi Besar

Location
- Country: Indonesia
- Provinces: Lampung
- Major cities: South Lampung Regency; Pesawaran Regency; Central Lampung Regency

Highway system
- Transport in Indonesia

Bakauheni-Bandar Lampung-Terbanggi Besar Toll Road or Bakter Toll Road is a 140.9 kilometers long controlled-access toll road that connects Bakauheni Port to Terbanggi Besar in Lampung, Indonesia. This toll road is part of a Trans-Sumatra Toll Road. The inauguration of the construction of the toll road was carried out on 30 April 2015 by President of Indonesia Joko Widodo. This toll road consists of two lanes in each direction, which has nine interchanges.

== Sections ==
- Section 1: Bakauheni-Sidomulyo (39 km)
- Section 2: Sidomulyo-Kotabaru (40 km)
- Section 3: Kotabaru-Metro (30 km)
- Section 4: Metro-Terbanggi Besar

== Progress ==
- Bakauheni–Terbanggi Besar, on January 5, 2018, predicted daily traffic is 16,097 vehicles/day:
  - Section 1: Bakauheni-Sidomulyo, 39.4 kilometers length, on January 21, 2018, 9 kilometers from Port to Bakauheni Interchange has been operated
  - Section 2: Sidomulyo-Kotabaru, 40.6 kilometers length, on January 21, 2018, 5 kilometers from Lematang Interchange to Kota Baru Interchange has been operated. The rest of Section 2, Section 3 and Section 4 have been operated on March 8, 2019.
  - Section 3: Kotabaru-Metro, 29.0 kilometers length.
  - Section 4: Metro-Terbanggi Besar, 31.9 kilometers length.

== Toll gates ==
This toll road consists of several toll gates:

- Bakauheni Selatan (Port): 5 Booths
- Bakauheni Utara (Penengahan): 4 Booths
- Kalianda: 4 Booths
- Sidomulyo: 4 Booths
- Lematang: 6 Booths
- Kotabaru: 4 Booths
- Natar: 6 Booths
- Tegineneng Barat (Masgar): 4 Booths
- Tegineneng Timur (Metro): 4 Booths
- Gunung Sugih: 4 Booths
- Terbanggi Besar: 4 Booths

Province	Location	km	mi	Exit	Name	Destinations	Notes
Lampung	Bakauheni, South Lampung Regency	0.0	0.0	0	Port of Bakauheni	Port of Bakauheni; Trans-Sumatra Highway (Eastern side)	Southern terminus
Lampung	Bakauheni, South Lampung Regency	2.4	1.5	Bakauheni Selatan Toll Gate			
Lampung	Bakauheni, South Lampung Regency	8.4	5.2	8	Bakauheni Utara Toll Gate	Penengahan; Bakauheni	
Lampung	Kalianda, South Lampung Regency	26.8	16.7	27	Kalianda Toll Gate	Kalianda	
Lampung	Sidomulyo, South Lampung Regency	38.6	24.0	38	Sidomulyo Toll Gate	Sidomulyo	
Lampung	Tanjung Bintang, South Lampung Regency	74.0	46.0	74	Lematang Toll Gate	Tanjung Bintang Industrial Complex; Panjang	
Lampung	Tanjung Bintang, South Lampung Regency	78.6	48.8	79	Itera Kotabaru Toll Gate	Kota Baru; Kedaton; Bandar Lampung	
Lampung	Natar, South Lampung Regency	94.9	59.0	95	Natar Toll Gate	Natar; Radin Inten II International Airport	
Lampung	Tegineneng, Pesawaran Regency	108.0	67.1	108	Tegineneng Barat Toll Gate; Tegineneng Timur Toll Gate	Tegineneng; Metro; Sukadana	
Lampung	Gunung Sugih, Central Lampung Regency	131.2	81.5	131	Gunung Sugih Toll Gate	Gunung Sugih; Bandar Jaya	
Lampung	Terbanggi Besar, Central Lampung Regency	140.1	87.1	140	Terbanggi Besar Toll Gate	Terbanggi Besar; Bandar Jaya; Kotabumi	Northern terminus
Lampung	Terbanggi Besar, Central Lampung Regency	140.8	87.5	Terbanggi Besar–Pematang Panggang Toll Road			
1.000 mi = 1.609 km; 1.000 km = 0.621 mi: Concurrency terminus; Electronic toll collection; Route transition

== See also ==
- Trans-Sumatra Toll Road
