= Bogor Ring Road =

Toll road in Indonesia

BORR Bogor Outer Ring Road
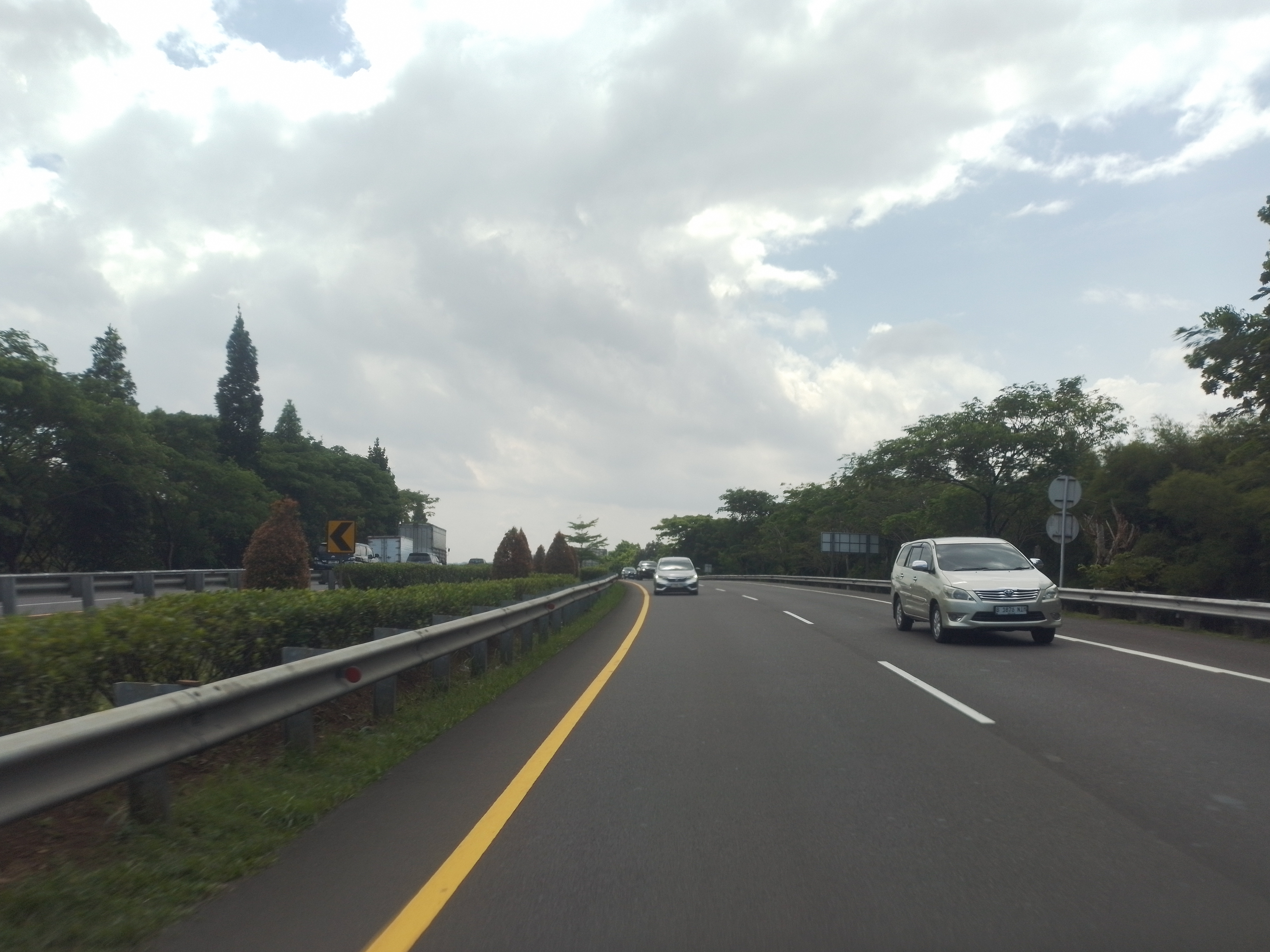

Route information
- Maintained by PT Marga Sarana Jabar (MSJ)
- Length: 11 km (6.8 mi)
- Existed: 2009–present

Major junctions
- East end: Sentul Selatan IC
- Jagorawi Toll Road
- West end: Salabenda

Location
- Country: Indonesia
- Major cities: Bogor

Highway system
- Transport in Indonesia

Bogor Ring Road, sometimes called BRR or BORR, is a controlled-access toll road which surrounds the city of Bogor in West Java, Indonesia.

== History ==
The construction of the first section was finished in 2009 and inaugurated by Minister of Public Works, Djoko Kirmanto on 23 November 2009.

== Sections ==
BRR is divided into 3 sections, it is planned to cross 11 villages in Bogor and 1 village in Bogor Regency.

Section	Segment	Status
I	Sentul Selatan-Kedunghalang	Opened
II	Kedunghalang-Simpang Yasmin	Opened
III	Simpang Yasmin-Simpang Salabenda	Partially opened

== Exits ==
KM	Location	Toll Gate/Interchange	Destination	Notes
00	Bogor Regency	Sentul Selatan Interchange	Sentul Selatan; Babakan Madang	Eastern terminus
00	Bogor Regency	Sentul Selatan Interchange	Jagorawi Toll Road	Eastern terminus
00	Bogor Regency	Sentul Barat Toll Gate	Main entry from/to Sentul Selatan	
02	Bogor	Tanah Baru Exit	Tanah Baru	Westbound exit only, Eastbound entry only
03	Bogor	Kedunghalang Exit	Kedunghalang; Cibinong; Jambu Dua; Bogor	Westbound exit only, Eastbound entry only
05	Bogor	Kedungbadak Exit	Kedungbadak	Westbound exit only, Eastbound entry only
06	Bogor	Yasmin Exit	Simpang Yasmin; Dramaga	Westbound exit only, Eastbound exit and entry only
08	Bogor	Yasmin Exit	Simpang Yasmin; Dramaga	Westbound exit only, Eastbound exit and entry only
10	Bogor	Kayu Manis Toll Gate	Simpang Semplak; Kayu Manis	Westbound exit only, Eastbound entry only

== Fee ==
Group I	Group II	Group III	Group IV	Group V
Rp 5,500	Rp 8,000	Rp 8,000	Rp 11,000	Rp 11,000

== See also ==
- Transport in Indonesia
- Trans-Java Toll Road
- List of toll roads in Indonesia
