= Palembang–Indralaya Toll Road =

Toll Road in Indonesia

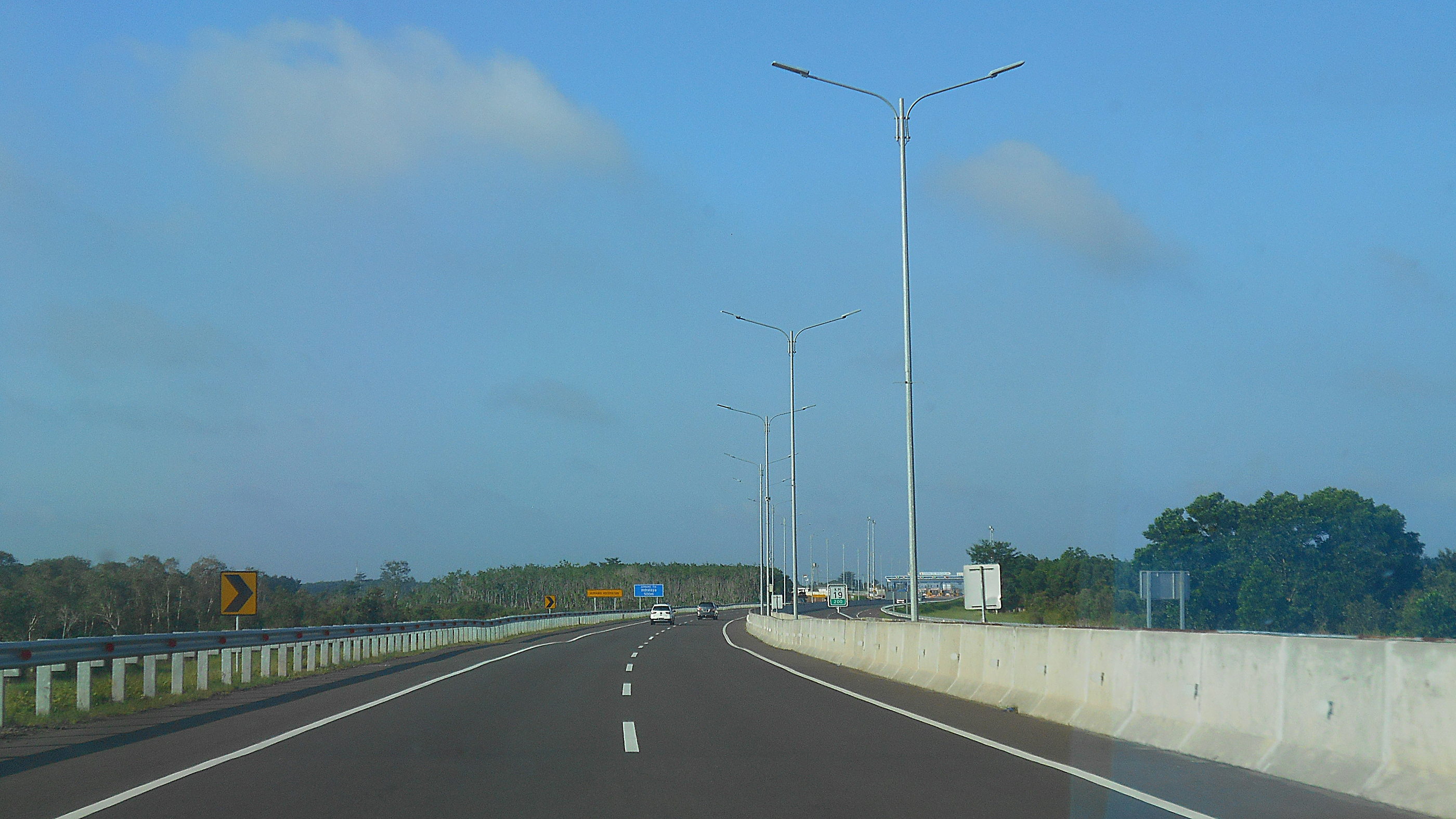
- Palembang–Indralaya Toll Road in 2020.

Route information
- Maintained by PT Hutama Karya Tbk
- Length: 22 km (14 mi)
- Existed: 2017–present

Major junctions
- Northeast end: Palembang
- Kayu Agung–Palembang–Betung Toll Road; Indralaya–Muara Enim Toll Road (Planned)
- Southwest end: Indralaya

Location
- Country: Indonesia
- Provinces: South Sumatra
- Major cities: Ogan Ilir Regency

Highway system
- Transport in Indonesia

Palembang–Indralaya Toll Road (shortened to Palindra Toll Road) is a controlled-access toll road in South Sumatra Province, Indonesia. This toll road is part of Trans-Sumatra Toll Road network.

== History ==
Section I of this toll road (Palembang-Pemulutan) was inaugurated by President Joko Widodo on 12 October 2017.

The Minister of Public Works and Housing, Basuki Hadimuljono, said that the construction of the toll road will be integrated with the development of the Merak-Bakauheni port. The road from the port will be connected with Palembang to the Tanjung Api-Api (TAA) port as part of President Joko Widodo's Sea Toll Program.

The construction of Palindra Toll Road is dominated by swampy lands with heavy terrain which requires a special construction technique using Vacuum Consolidation Method (VCM). The planned lane on this toll road is 100 kilometres per hour (62 mph) with 2x2 lanes in the early stages and 2x3 in the final stages.

The toll road was free since its inauguration until the end of 2017.

== Sections ==
Section	Segment	Length
I	Palembang-Pemulutan	7 kilometres (4.3 mi)
II	Pemulutan-KTM Rambutan	5 kilometres (3.1 mi)
III	KTM Rambutan-Indralaya	10 kilometres (6.2 mi)

== Exits ==
Province	Location	km	mi	Exit	Name	Destinations	Notes
South Sumatra	Pemulutan, Ogan Ilir Regency	0.0	0.0	0	Palembang Ramp	Palembang; Jakabaring Sports City; Sultan Mahmud Badaruddin II International Airport	Northeastern terminus
South Sumatra	Pemulutan, Ogan Ilir Regency	1.0	0.62	Palembang Toll Gate			
South Sumatra	Pemulutan, Ogan Ilir Regency	1.9	1.2	2	Pemulutan Interchange	Kayu Agung–Palembang–Betung Toll Road; West-bound; Kramasan; Sungai Rengas; Jambi; East-bound; Jejawi; Kayu Agung; Lampung	Unbuilt as of 2022
South Sumatra	Pemulutan, Ogan Ilir Regency	6.8	4.2	7	Pemulutan Toll Gate	Pemulutuan	
South Sumatra	West Pemulutan, Ogan Ilir Regency	11.8	7.3	12	KTM Rambutan Toll Gate	KTM Rambutan	
South Sumatra	Indralaya, Ogan Ilir Regency	20.0	12.4	Indralaya Toll Gate			
South Sumatra	Indralaya, Ogan Ilir Regency	18.2	11.3	18	Indralaya Ramp	Indralaya; Prabumulih; Muara Enim	Southwestern terminus
1.000 mi = 1.609 km; 1.000 km = 0.621 mi: Electronic toll collection; Incomplete access; Route transition; Unopened

== See also ==
- Trans-Sumatra Toll Road
