= Kayu Agung–Palembang–Betung Toll Road =

Toll Road in Indonesia

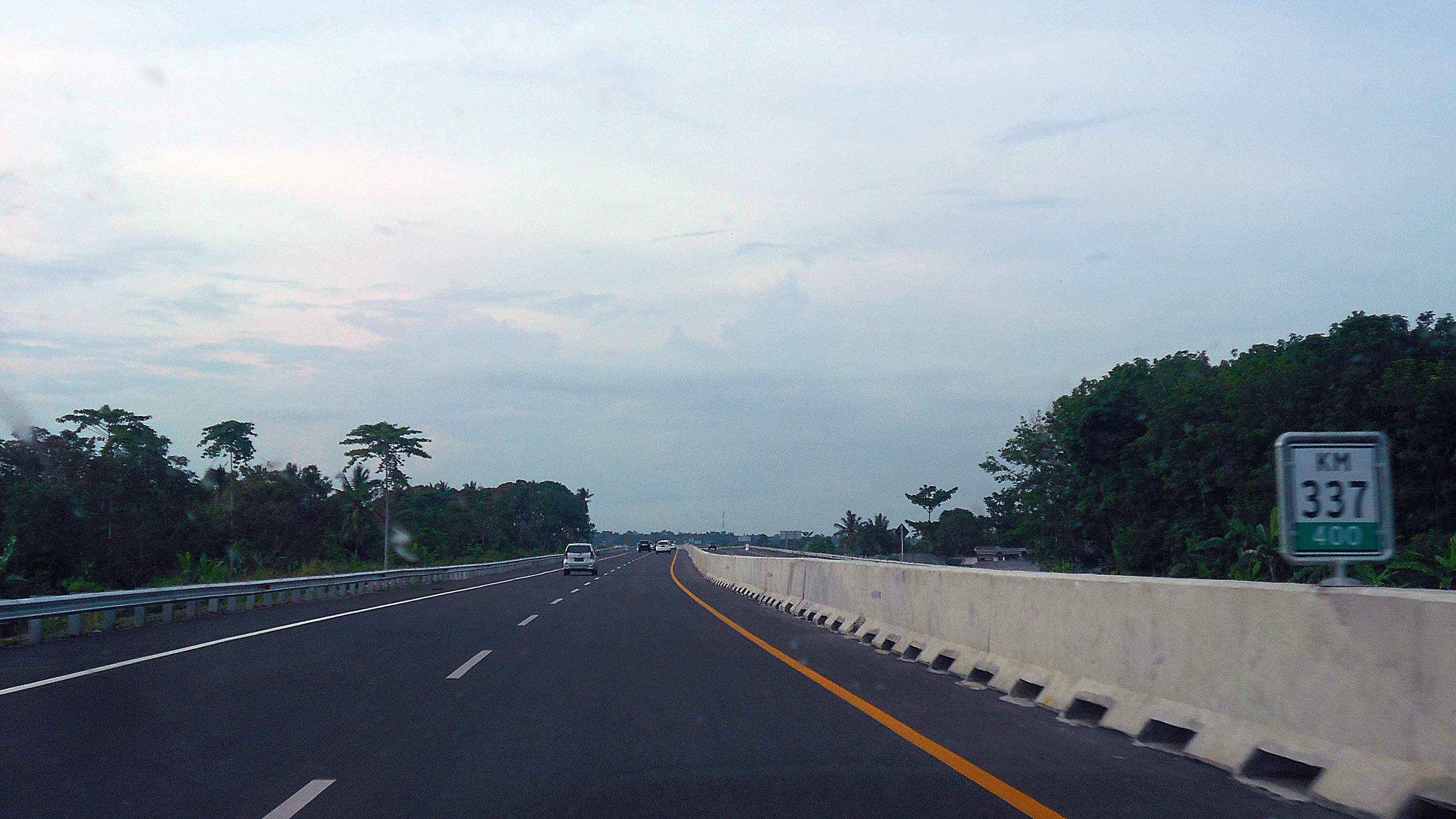
- Kapalbetung Toll Road kilometer 337 in Ogan Komering Ilir Regency, South Sumatra

Route information
- Part of AH25
- Maintained by PT Sriwijaya Waskita Tol
- Length: 111.7 km (69.4 mi)

Major junctions
- South end: Kayu Agung
- Pematang Panggang–Kayuagung Toll Road; Palembang–Indralaya Toll Road; Betung–Jambi Toll Road
- North end: Betung

Location
- Country: Indonesia
- Provinces: South Sumatra
- Major cities: Ogan Komering Ilir Regency; Ogan Ilir Regency; Palembang; Banyuasin Regency

Highway system
- Transport in Indonesia
- Trans-Sumatra Toll Road

Kayu Agung–Palembang–Betung Toll Road or Kapal Betung/Kapalbetung Toll Road is a 111.7-kilometre-long (69.4 mi) controlled-access toll road, which is part of Trans-Sumatra Toll Road. The toll road is managed by PT Waskita Sriwijaya Tol stretching from the township of Kayu Agung, passing through the major city of Palembang, and terminating at the township of Betung. The toll road connects Lampung–Palembang corridor with the Palembang–Jambi corridor of Trans-Sumatra Toll Road network.

== History ==
The first section of the toll road was inaugurated by President Joko Widodo on 26 January 2021. The President stated that the inauguration of the toll road has cut travel time from Bakauheni to Palembang from 12 hours road trip to only around 3.5 hours of road trip. The second section of the toll road is scheduled to be inaugurated in August 2023.

== Sections ==
This toll road is divided into three sections:

Sections	Destinations	Length
Section I	Kayu Agung-Jakabaring	33.5 km
Section II	Jakabaring-Musilandas	33.9 km
Section III	Musilandas-Betung	44.29 km

Section I opened on April 1, 2020, with a temporary exit to Jakabaring.

== Exits ==
There are 5 planned exits in this toll road:

- Kayu Agung (km 329)
- Jejawi (km 347)
- Kramasan (km 371)
- Pangkalan Balai (km 415)
- Betung (km 433)

Currently a temporary exit to Jakabaring is constructed in Section I as other Sections are awaiting completion.

Province	Location	km	mi	Exit	Name	Destinations	Notes
South Sumatra	Kayu Agung, Ogan Komering Ilir Regency	329.0	204.4	Pematang Panggang–Kayuagung Toll Road			
South Sumatra	Kayu Agung, Ogan Komering Ilir Regency	329.8	204.9	329	Kayuagung Toll Gate	Kayu Agung; Indralaya	Southern terminus
South Sumatra	Kayu Agung, Ogan Komering Ilir Regency	330.0	205.1	Kayuagung Utama Toll Gate			
South Sumatra	Jejawi, Ogan Komering Ilir Regency	347.4	215.9	347	Jejawi Toll Gate	Lingkis; Muara Batun; Karang Agung	
South Sumatra	Pemulutan, Ogan Ilir Regency	360.4	223.9	360	Jakabaring Ramp	Jakabaring Sports City	Temporary exit, south-bound only
South Sumatra	Pemulutan, Ogan Ilir Regency	367.5	228.4	367	Kramasan Toll Gate	Pemulutan; Palembang; Kertapati	
South Sumatra	Banyuasin Regency				Sungai Rengas Toll Gate		
South Sumatra	Banyuasin Regency				Pulau Rimau Toll Gate		
South Sumatra	Banyuasin Regency				Pangkalan Balai Toll Gate		
South Sumatra	Banyuasin Regency			Betung–Tempino–Jambi Toll Road (Planned)			
1.000 mi = 1.609 km; 1.000 km = 0.621 mi: Electronic toll collection; Incomplete access; Route transition	Banyuasin Regency						
