= Pekanbaru–Dumai Toll Road =

Road in Indonesia

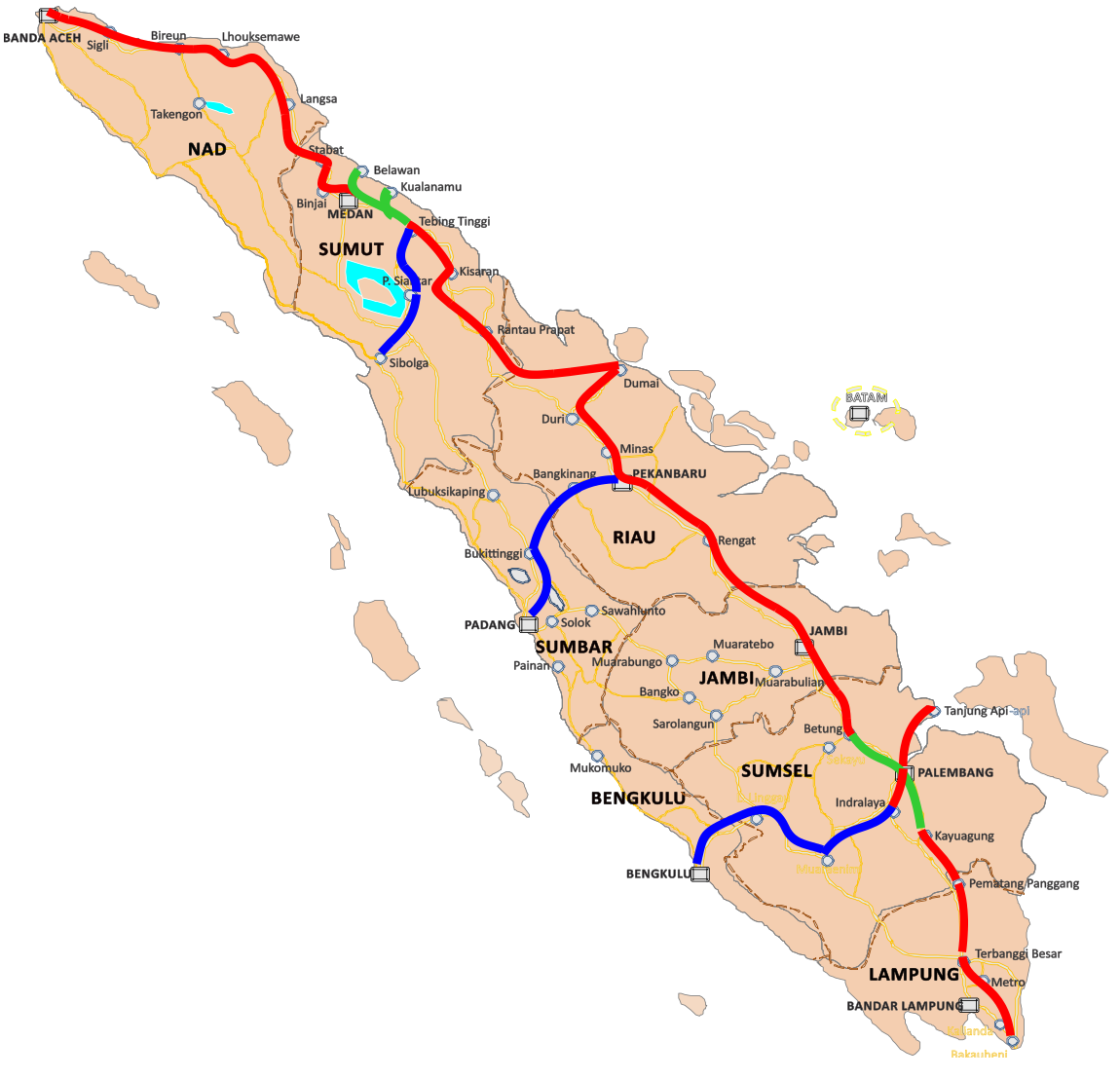

Route information
- Part of AH25
- Maintained by PT Hutama Karya (Persero)
- Length: 140 km (87 mi)
- Existed: 2019–present

Major junctions
- South end: Pekanbaru
- North end: Dumai

Location
- Country: Indonesia
- Provinces: Riau
- Major cities: Pekanbaru; Siak Regency; Bengkalis Regency; Dumai

Highway system
- Transport in Indonesia

Pekanbaru–Dumai Toll Road is a controlled-access toll road linked from Pekanbaru to Dumai in Riau, Indonesia. This toll road is part of Trans-Sumatra Toll Road network.

== Project ==
Groundbreaking of construction of this toll road was done in 2013. State owned Hutama Karya constructed the toll road. The road was originally expected to be operational by the end of 2019. but was only inaugurated by Indonesian President Joko Widodo on 25 September 2020.

== Exits ==
Province	Location	km	mi	Exit	Name	Destinations	Notes
Riau	Rumbai, Pekanbaru	0	0.0	0	Pekanbaru Ramp	Pekanbaru; Sultan Syarif Kasim II International Airport	Southern terminus
Riau	Rumbai, Pekanbaru	0.8	0.50	Pekanbaru Toll Gate			
Riau	Minas, Siak Regency			8	Minas Toll Gate	Minas	
Riau	Kandis, Siak Regency	33.2	20.6	33	Kandis Selatan Toll Gate	South Kandis	
Riau	Kandis, Siak Regency	49.8	30.9	49	Kandis Utara Toll Gate	North Kandis	
Riau	Pinggir, Bengkalis Regency	76.3	47.4	76	Pinggir Toll Gate	Pinggir; Duri	
Riau	Mandau, Bengkalis Regency	97.0	60.3	97	Bumbung Interchange	Dumai–Mandau Link; Dumai	
Riau	Mandau, Bengkalis Regency	104.2	64.7	104	Bathin Solapan Toll Gate	Bathin Solapan; Simpang Bangko	
1.000 mi = 1.609 km; 1.000 km = 0.621 mi: Electronic toll collection; Route transition; Unopened

=== Dumai–Mandau Link ===
Province	Location	km	mi	Exit	Name	Destinations	Notes
Riau	Bukit Kapur, Dumai	0.0	0.0	0	Dumai Ramp	Dumai; Pinang Kampai Airport	
Riau	Bukit Kapur, Dumai	1.0	0.62	Dumai Toll Gate			
Riau	Mandau, Bengkalis Regency	24.7	15.3	24	Bumbung Interchange	Pekanbaru–Dumai Toll Road; Northbound; Bathin Solapan; Rantau Prapat; Southbound; Kandis; Pekanbaru	
1.000 mi = 1.609 km; 1.000 km = 0.621 mi: Electronic toll collection; Route transition
