= Sumatra Institute of Technology =

Indonesian technology-focused public university

Sumatera Institute of Technology
- Institut Teknologi Sumatera
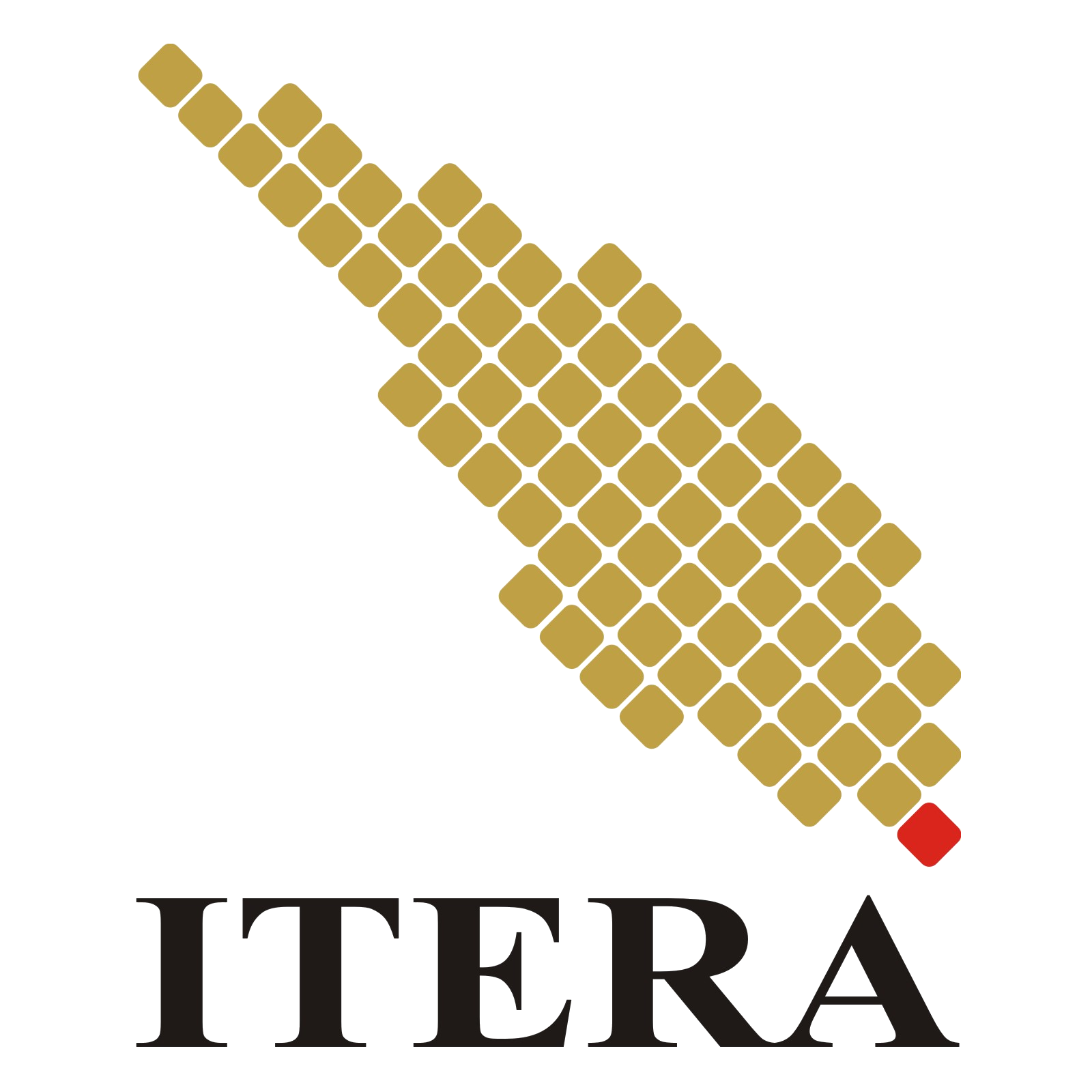
- Motto: Smart, Friendly, and Forest Campus
- Type: Public university
- Established: October 6, 2014; 11 years ago
- Affiliations: Bandung Institute of Technology
- Rector: Prof. Dr. I Nyoman Pugeg Aryantha
- Location: Jalan Terusan Ryacudu, Way Hui, Jati Agung, South Lampung Regency, Lampung, Indonesia
- Campus: Suburban, 285 ha (700 acres)
- Colors: Black
- Website: www.itera.ac.id

Sumatera Institute of Technology (Indonesian: Institut Teknologi Sumatera, abbreviated as ITERA) is a public university in South Lampung, Lampung, Indonesia.

ITERA has three faculties and 40 undergraduate programs, with 1 postgraduate program in physics.

== History ==
ITERA was founded in 2014 as part of the implementation of the Master Plan for Acceleration and Expansion on Indonesia's Economic Development (Indonesian: Masterplan Percepatan dan Perluasan Pembangunan Ekonomi Indonesia) or MP3EI.

ITERA was created to increase the number of Indonesian STEM graduates. To ensure the quality of its program, ITERA had also entered a 10-year partnership with Bandung Institute of Technology.

== Academics ==
=== Faculty ===
The following are the programs available in ITERA:

==== Faculty of Infrastructure and Territorial Technology ====
- Urban and Regional Planning
- Civil Engineering
- Geomatics Engineering
- Architecture
- Environmental Engineering
- Ocean Engineering
- Landscape Architecture
- Visual Communication Design
- Railway Engineering
- Tourism

==== Faculty of Science ====
- Mathematics
- Physics
- Chemistry
- Biology
- Atmospheric and Planetary Science
- Pharmacy
- Actuarial Science
- Data Science
- Marine Environmental Science

==== Faculty of Industrial Technology ====
- Electrical Engineering
- Geophysics Engineering
- Informatics Engineering
- Mechanical Engineering
- Industrial Engineering
- Geological Engineering
- Energy Systems Engineering
- Chemical Engineering
- Physics Engineering
- Material Engineering
- Telecommunications Engineering
- Mining Engineering
- Food Technology
- Agricultural Industry Technology
- Biosystem Engineering
- Forestry Engineering
- Biomedical Engineering
- Oil and Gas Engineering
- Instrumentation and Automation Engineering
- Cosmetic Engineering
- Sports Engineering

=== Ranking ===
ITERA was ranked as the 134th best university in Indonesia according to Webometrics’ 2021 report.
