= Sigli–Banda Aceh Toll Road =

Toll road in Indonesia

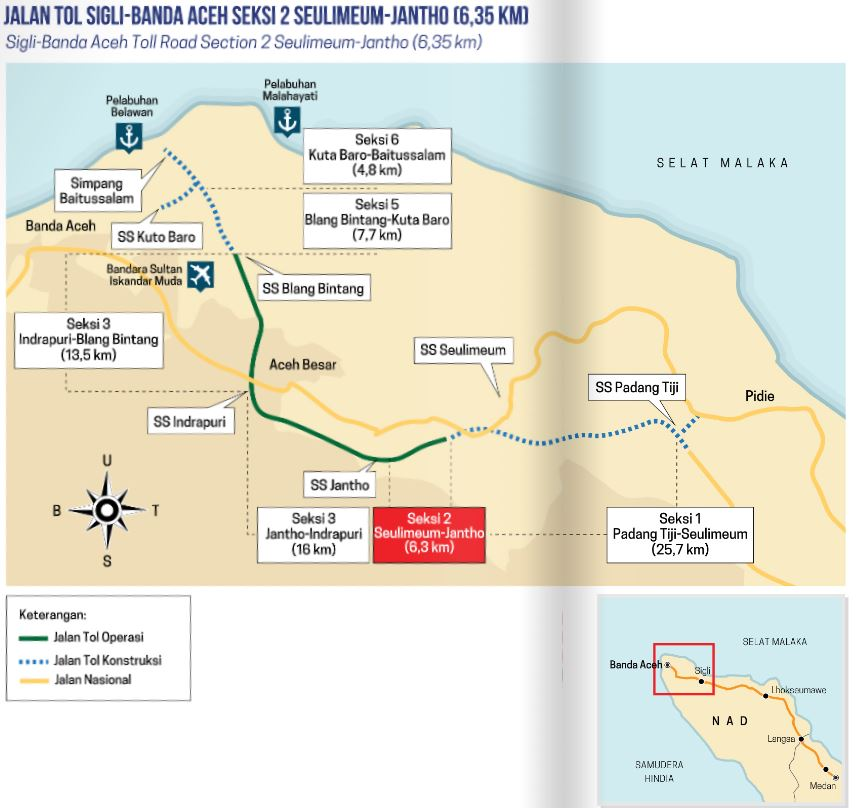

Route information
- Part of AH25
- Maintained by PT Hutama Karya (Persero) as part of a government-granted monopoly on the Trans-Sumatra Toll Road system
- Length: 74.1 km (46.0 mi)
- Existed: 2020–present

Major junctions
- From: Banda Aceh
- To: Sigli

Location
- Country: Indonesia
- Major cities: Banda Aceh, Sigli, Indrapuri

Highway system
- Transport in Indonesia

Sigli–Banda Aceh Toll Road is a controlled-access toll road that connects Banda Aceh to Sigli in Aceh, Indonesia. The Sigli-Banda Aceh toll road project began in 2018. This toll road is the northern stage of the Banda Aceh-Medan corridor of the Trans-Sumatra Toll Road network.

== Sections ==
The toll road spans 74.1 km and is divided into six sections. The entire Sigli-Banda Aceh toll road is expected to operate fully by December 2021. The Indrapuri-Blang Bintang section (13.5 kilometers) was inaugurated in August, 2020. It is the first ever toll road in Aceh province.

- Section 1 extending along Padang Tiji to Seulimeum, spanning a distance of 24.3 kilometers;
- Section 2, from Seulimeum to Jantho, 7. 6 kilometer s long;
- Section 3, Jantho-Indrapuri totaling 16 kilometers;
- Section 4 that stretches from Indrapuri to Blang Bintang for 13.5 kilometers;
- Section 5 Blang Bintang-Kuto Baro, with a length of 7.7 kilometers; and
- Section 6 Kuto Baro-Baitussalam that stretches for five kilometers.

== Interchanges ==
Section IV has two interchanges namely the Indrapuri Interchange and the Blang Bintang interchange.

== Toll gates ==
The Banda Aceh - Sigli toll road would have six intersections, seven toll gates, and two rest area facilities.
