= Trans-Sumatra Toll Road =

Highway network in Indonesia

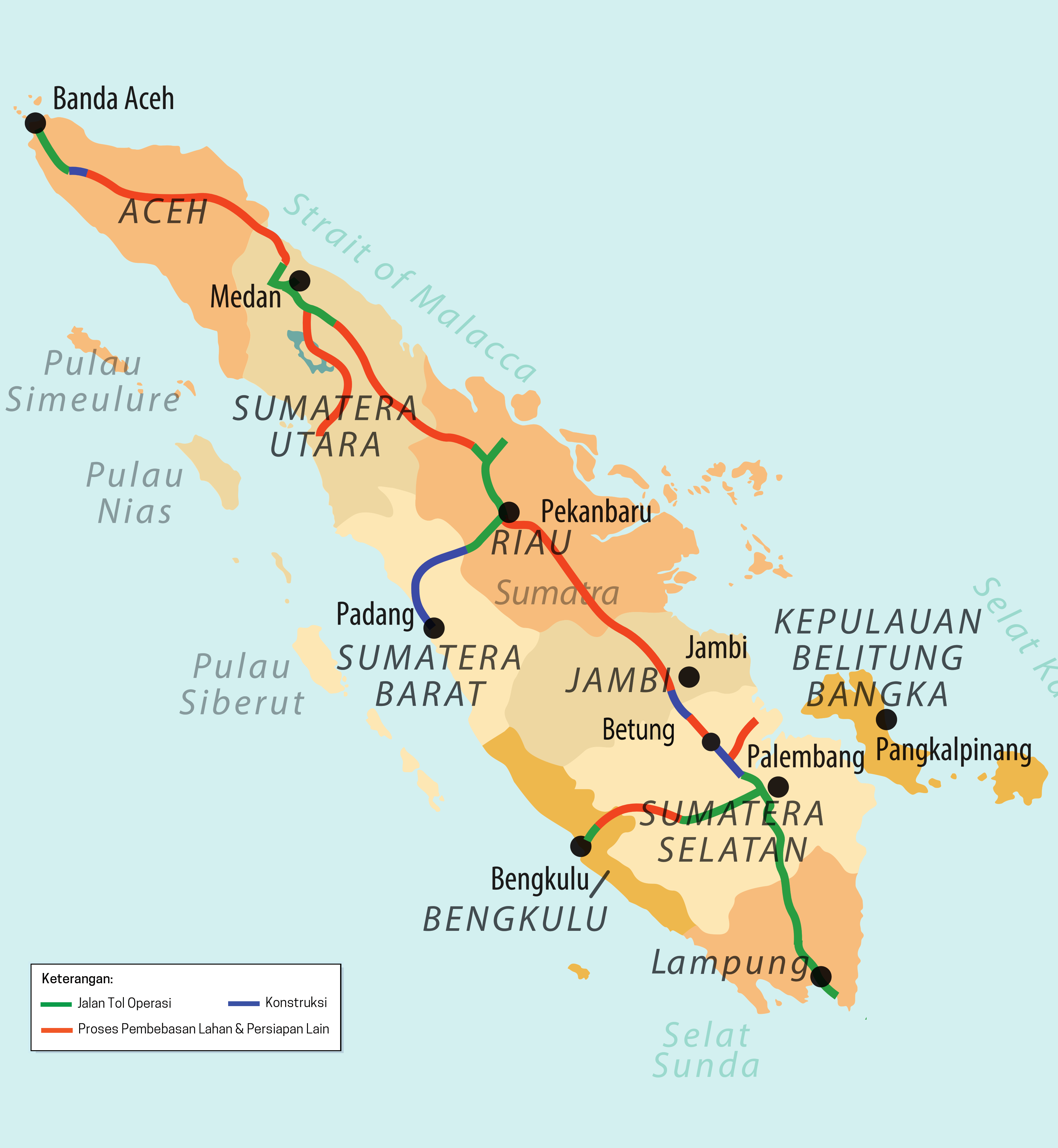
- Planned routes of the Trans-Sumatra Toll Road as of 2023. Green: operated Blue: Under construction Red: Planned

System information
- Maintained by PT Hutama Karya (Persero) (Note: Nationalized from Hollandsche Beton Maatschappij, which becomes Hollandsche Beton Groep nv (HBG), later acquired by Royal BAM Group) by order of the President of Indonesia

Highway names

The Trans-Sumatra Toll Road is an under-construction tolled expressway stretching across Sumatra Island in Indonesia from the northern tip of Banda Aceh to the southern tip of Bakauheni. This toll road was originally planned to connect to the established toll road system of Java through the now cancelled Sunda Strait Bridge. The toll road is to include supporting corridors connecting the cities of Padang, Bengkulu, and Sibolga on the western coast of the island to the main corridors stretching across the more populated eastern coast. State construction company Hutama Karya has been given a government-granted monopoly to operate the network.

The road's entire length of 2,818 km (1,751 mi) will cost an estimated Rp476 trillion (US$33.2 billion) and consist of seventeen main segments and seven supporting segments. The toll road is expected to be completed by 2024. As of October 2024, 1,235 km (767 mi) of the road were completed and operational.

== Main corridors ==
Total length of the main corridors are estimated to be 2,048 km (1,273 mi), consisting of:

- Banda Aceh–Medan (460 km (286 mi)).
- Medan–Pekanbaru (548 km (341 mi)).
- Pekanbaru–Palembang (610 km).
- Palembang–Lampung (358 km (222 mi)).

=== List of completed and under-construction segments ===
1. Bakauheni–Terbanggi Besar (140.9 km (88 mi)). Formally opened on March 8, 2019.

2. Terbanggi Besar–Pematang Panggang–Kayu Agung (189.2 km). Currently the longest toll road in Indonesia. Formally opened on November 15, 2019.

3. Kayu Agung–Palembang–Betung Toll Road (111.7 km (69 mi)). Section I, which is 33.5 km in length is operational since April 1, 2020. The remaining sections are under-construction.

4. Pekanbaru–Dumai (131.5 km (81.7 mi) Completed on 25 September 2020.

5. Kuala Tanjung–Tebing Tinggi–Pematang Siantar–Parapat (125.45 km (77.95 mi)).

6. Medan–Kualanamu–Tebing Tinggi (61.7 km (38.3 mi)) Formally opened on March 24, 2019.

7. Medan–Binjai (16.72 km (10.39 mi)) Section II and III started operation on October 13, 2017.

8. Sigli–Banda Aceh Toll Road (74 km (46 mi)) Section IV was inaugurated in August 2020. Section III in December 2020. Section I, II, V, and VI in 2021.

=== List of planned segments ===
1.Betung–Jambi (168 km).

2.Jambi-Rengat (198.74 km (123.49 mi)).

3.Rengat–Pekanbaru (173 km (107 mi)).

4.Dumai–Rantau Prapat (176.1 km (109.4 mi)).

5.Rantau Prapat–Kisaran (110 km (68 mi)).

6.Kisaran-Indrapura (47.55 km (29.55 mi)).

7.Binjai–Langsa (130 km (81 mi)).

8.Langsa–Lhokseumawe (135 km (84 mi)).

9.Lhokseumawe–Sigli (135 km (84 mi)).

== Supporting corridors ==
Total length of the supporting corridors are 770 km, consisting of:

- Palembang–Bengkulu (303 km (188 mi)).
- Pekanbaru–Padang (242 km (150 mi)).
- Medan–Sibolga (175 km (109 mi)).

=== List of completed and under-construction segments ===
1. Palembang–Indralaya Toll Road (22 km (14 mi)). All Sections are operational in 2018, followed by KTM exit in 2019.

2. Lubuk Linggau–Curup–Bengkulu (95.8 km (59.5 mi)).

3. Padang–Bukittinggi–Pekanbaru (242 km (150 mi)).

4. Indralaya–Muara Enim (119 km (74 mi))

=== List of planned segments ===
1. Muara Enim–Lubuk Linggau (106 km (66 mi))

2. Sibolga–Parapat (103 km (64 mi))

== Progress and completion ==
Ground-breaking of the toll road was held on October 10, 2014. As of March 2020, a total of 500 km (310 mi) from all corridors are operational. These include Bakauheni–Terbanggi Besar (140.7 km (87.4 mi)), Terbanggi Besar–Pematang Panggang–Kayu Agung (189.2 km (117.6 mi)), Palembang–Indralaya (21.93 km (13.63 mi)), Medan–Kualanamu–Tebing Tinggi (61.7 km (38.3 mi)), Medan–Binjai Section 2 and 3 (10.46 km (6.50 mi)), and Belawan–Medan–Tanjung Morawa (42.7 km (26.5 mi)). While the functional segment is Kayu Agung–Palembang–Betung Section I (33.5 km (20.8 mi))

=== Progress table ===
Overall Progress of Trans-Sumatra Toll Roads (December 2023)
Segments	Sections	Progress	Scheduled Operation
Bakauheni–Terbanggi Besar (140.7 km)	Section I (39.4 km)	100%	January 2018
Bakauheni–Terbanggi Besar (140.7 km)	Section II (40.6 km)	100%	January 2019
Bakauheni–Terbanggi Besar (140.7 km)	Section III (29 km)	100%	January 2019
Bakauheni–Terbanggi Besar (140.7 km)	Section IV (31.93 km)	100%	January 2019
Terbanggi Besar–Pematang Panggang–Kayu Agung (189.2 km)	Section I (112.2 km)	100%	November 2019
Terbanggi Besar–Pematang Panggang–Kayu Agung (189.2 km)	Section II (77 km)	100%	November 2019
Kayu Agung–Palembang–Betung (111.7 km)	Section I (33.5 km)	100%	March 2020
Kayu Agung–Palembang–Betung (111.7 km)	Section IIA (9 km)	100%	January 2020
Kayu Agung–Palembang–Betung (111.7 km)	Section IIB (24.9 km)	77.9%	2026
Kayu Agung–Palembang–Betung (111.7 km)	Section III (44.9 km)	53.8%	2026
Palembang–Indralaya (21.93 km)	Section I (7 km)	100%	October 2017
Palembang–Indralaya (21.93 km)	Section II (5.65 km)	100%	September 2018
Palembang–Indralaya (21.93 km)	Section III (9.28 km)	100%	September 2018
Pekanbaru–Dumai (131.5 km)	Section I (9.5 km)	100%	January 2020
Pekanbaru–Dumai (131.5 km)	Section II (24.1 km)	100%	January 2020
Pekanbaru–Dumai (131.5 km)	Section III (16.9 km)	100%	July 2020
Pekanbaru–Dumai (131.5 km)	Section IV (26.25 km)	100%	July 2020
Pekanbaru–Dumai (131.5 km)	Section V (29.4 km)	100%	July 2020
Pekanbaru–Dumai (131.5 km)	Section VI (25.44 km)	100%	July 2020
Medan–Kualanamu–Tebing Tinggi (61.7 km)	Section IA (3.25 km)	100%	April 2018
Medan–Kualanamu–Tebing Tinggi (61.7 km)	Section IB (7.5 km)	100%	April 2018
Medan–Kualanamu–Tebing Tinggi (61.7 km)	Section II (7.05 km)	100%	October 13, 2017
Medan–Kualanamu–Tebing Tinggi (61.7 km)	Section III (4.4 km)	100%	October 13, 2017
Medan–Kualanamu–Tebing Tinggi (61.7 km)	Section IVA (6.6 km)	100%	October 13, 2017
Medan–Kualanamu–Tebing Tinggi (61.7 km)	Section IVB (6.22 km)	100%	October 13, 2017
Medan–Kualanamu–Tebing Tinggi (61.7 km)	Section V (9.6 km)	100%	October 13, 2017
Medan–Kualanamu–Tebing Tinggi (61.7 km)	Section VI (7.8 km)	100%	October 13, 2017
Medan–Kualanamu–Tebing Tinggi (61.7 km)	Section VIIA (4.49 km)	100%	January 2019
Medan–Kualanamu–Tebing Tinggi (61.7 km)	Section VIIB (4.81 km)	100%	January 2019
Medan–Binjai (16.72 km)	Section I (6.27 km):	100%	
Medan–Binjai (16.72 km)	Section IA	100%	April 2019
Medan–Binjai (16.72 km)	Section IB	100%	January 2021
Medan–Binjai (16.72 km)	Section IC	100%	January 2021
Medan–Binjai (16.72 km)	Section ID	100%	January 2021
Medan–Binjai (16.72 km)	Section II (6.18 km)	100%	October 13, 2017
Medan–Binjai (16.72 km)	Section III (4.28 km)	100%	October 13, 2017
Kuala Tanjung–Tebing Tinggi–Pematang Siantar–Parapat (125.45 km)	Section I (20.4 km)	100%	2024
Kuala Tanjung–Tebing Tinggi–Pematang Siantar–Parapat (125.45 km)	Section II (18.05 km)	100%	2024
Kuala Tanjung–Tebing Tinggi–Pematang Siantar–Parapat (125.45 km)	Section III (30 km)	100%	2024
Kuala Tanjung–Tebing Tinggi–Pematang Siantar–Parapat (125.45 km)	Section IV (28 km)	85%	2024
Kuala Tanjung–Tebing Tinggi–Pematang Siantar–Parapat (125.45 km)	Section V (22.3 km)	0%	-
Kuala Tanjung–Tebing Tinggi–Pematang Siantar–Parapat (125.45 km)	Section VI (16.7 km)	0%	-
Sigli–Banda Aceh (74 km)	Section I (25.7 km)	89%	February 2025
Sigli–Banda Aceh (74 km)	Section II (6.3 km)	100%	December 2021
Sigli–Banda Aceh (74 km)	Section III (16 km)	100%	December 2020
Sigli–Banda Aceh (74 km)	Section IV (13.5 km)	100%	July 2020
Sigli–Banda Aceh (74 km)	Section V (7.7 km)	100%	June 2023
Sigli–Banda Aceh (74 km)	Section VI (4.8 km)	100%	June 2023
Indrapura–Kisaran (47.55 km)	Section I (15.60 km)	100%	December 2023
Indrapura–Kisaran (47.55 km)	Section II (32.15 km)	100%	2024
Pekanbaru–Padang (255 km)	Section I (36 km)	82%	January 2025
Pekanbaru–Padang (255 km)	Section II (41 km)	0%	>2024
Pekanbaru–Padang (255 km)	Section III (36 km)	0%	>2024
Pekanbaru–Padang (255 km)	Section IV (43 km)	0%	>2024
Pekanbaru–Padang (255 km)	Section V (Phase 1) (24.7 km)	100%	2024
Pekanbaru–Padang (255 km)	Section V (Phase 2) (13.60 km)	0%	>2024
Pekanbaru–Padang (255 km)	Section V (Phase 3) (22.70 km)	0%	>2024
Pekanbaru–Padang (255 km)	Section VI (38 km)	100%	2022
Simpang Indralaya–Muara Enim (119 km)	Section I (64.5 km)	100%	October 2023
Simpang Indralaya–Muara Enim (119 km)	Section II (54.6 km)	8.69%	>2024
Lubuk Linggau–Curup–Bengkulu (95.8 km)	Section I (54.5 km)	0%	-
Lubuk Linggau–Curup–Bengkulu (95.8 km)	Section II (23.7 km)	0%	-
Lubuk Linggau–Curup–Bengkulu (95.8 km)	Section III (17.6 km)	100%	2023
Betung-Tempino-Jambi (169.3 km)	Section I (61.55 km)	9%	2026
Betung-Tempino-Jambi (169.3 km)	Section II (55.73 km)	0%	2026
Betung-Tempino-Jambi (169.3 km)	Section III (33.04 km)	100%	November 2024
Betung-Tempino-Jambi (169.3 km)	Section IV (18.97 km)	37%	2025
Binjai–Langsa (130.91 km)	Section I (12.30 km)	100%	December 2022
Binjai–Langsa (130.91 km)	Section II (26.2 km)	100%	2024

Construction progress sourced from BPJT

== See also ==
- Trans-Java Toll Road (Java)
