= Central Lampung Regency =

Regency in Lampung, Indonesia

Central Lampung Regency Kabupaten Lampung Tengah
- Regency
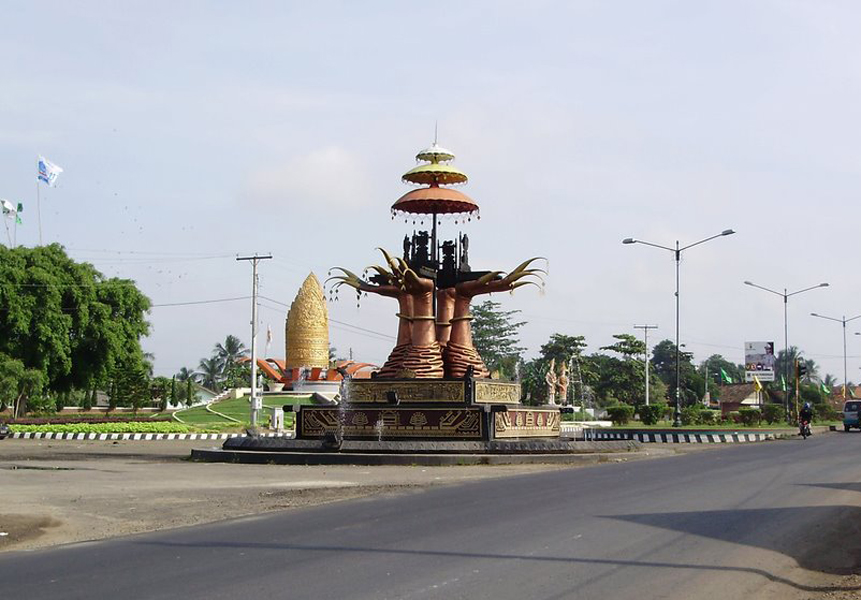
- Monument in Gunung Sugih, capital of Central Lampung

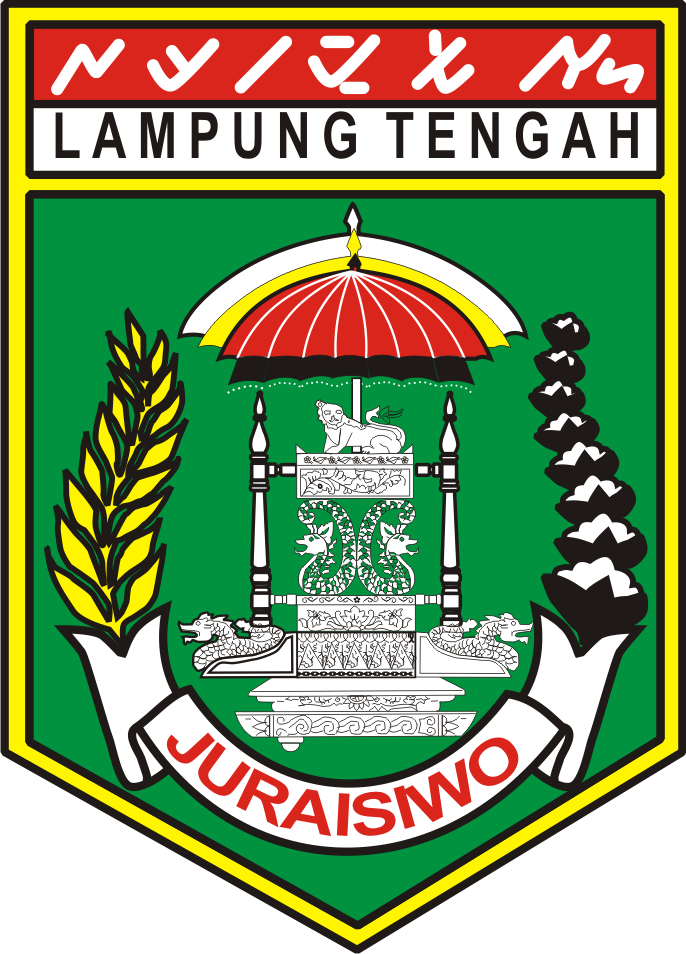
- Coat of arms
- Motto: Jurai Siwo (Nine clans)
- Location within Lampung

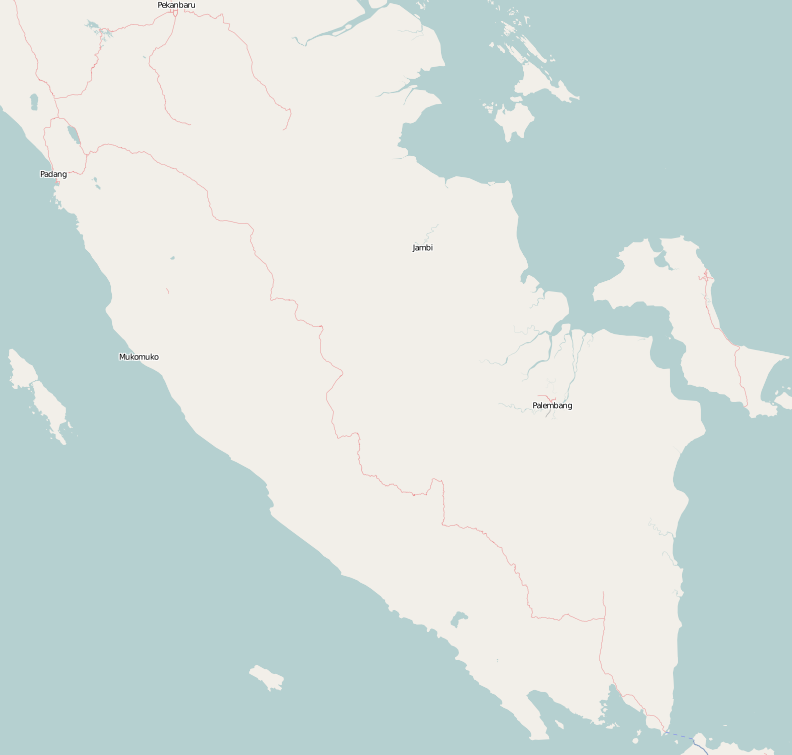
- Location in Southern Sumatra, Sumatra and Indonesia Central Lampung Regency (Sumatra) Central Lampung Regency (Indonesia)
- Coordinates: 4.8667°S 105.2667°E
- Country: Indonesia
- Province: Lampung
- Regency seat: Gunung Sugih

Government
  - Regent: Ardito Wijaya
  - Vice Regent: I Komang Koheri

Area
  - Total: 4,559.57 km^{2} (1,760.46 sq mi)

Population (mid 2025 estimate)
  - Total: 1,408,803
  - Density: 308.977/km^{2} (800.247/sq mi)
- Time zone: UTC+7 (IWST)
- Area code: (+62) 725
- Website: lampungtengahkab.go.id

Central Lampung Regency is a regency of the province of Lampung, on Sumatra, Indonesia. On 20 April 1999, two areas were separated from the original regency - the southeastern portion was split off to form a separate East Lampung Regency (including all of the regency's former sea coast), while the town of Metro was created as an independent city. The reduced regency, now landlocked, has an area of 4,559.57 km^{2} and had a population of 1,170,048 people at the 2010 census and 1,460,045 at the 2020 census; the official estimate as of mid 2025 was 1,408,803 (comprising 717,830 males and 690,973 females), indicating a population decline since 2020. The regency seat is the town of Gunung Sugih.

== Administrative districts ==
Central Lampung Regency consists of twenty-eight districts (kecamatan), tabulated below with their areas and their populations at the 2010 census and 2020 census, together with the official estimates as of mid 2025. For ease of location, they are grouped below into three geographical sectors (which have no administrative function). The table also includes the locations of the district administrative centres, the number of villages in each district (totaling 301 rural desa or kampung, and 10 urban kelurahan), and its post code.

Kode Wilayah	Name of District (kecamatan)	Area in km^{2}	Pop'n 2010 census	Pop'n 2020 census	Pop'n mid 2025 estimate	Admin centre	No. of villages	Post code
18.02.03	Padang Ratu	164.13	47,457	62,716	57,757	Haduyang Ratu	15	34175
18.02.20	Selagai Lingga	272.62	31,253	39,956	36,675	Negri Katon	14	34177
18.02.19	Pubian	187.77	40,514	53,854	49,343	Negri Kepayungan	20	34176
18.02.21	Anak Tuha	162.81	35,314	48,028	44,806	Negara Aji Tua	12	34161
18.02.27	Anak Ratu Aji	70.28	15,370	19,927	19,135	Gedung Sari	6	35513
18.02.01	Kalirejo	110.35	62,808	76,884	76,731	Kalirejo	17	34174
18.02.22	Sendang Agung	99.46	36,006	45,996	44,042	Sendang Agung	9	34178
18.02.02	Bangun Rejo	104.97	55,232	70,242	69,311	Bangun Rejo	17	34173
18.02.15	Bekri	94.21	25,077	31,370	30,664	Kusumadadi	8	34162
Sub-totals for	Western Sector	1,266.60	349,031	449,973	428,464		118	
18.02.04	Gunung Sugih	164.14	62,043	78,030	76,707	Gunung Sugih	15 ^{(a)}	34165
18.02.14	Bumi Ratu Nuban	63.75	28,419	35,533	35,150	Bulusari	10	34160
18.02.05	Trimurjo	64.88	48,829	58,570	56,226	Simbar Waringin	14 ^{(b)}	34171 & 34172
18.02.06	Punggur	60.74	35,920	42,068	42,297	Tanggul Angin	9	34152
18.02.23	Kota Gajah	46.93	31,600	37,064	36,123	Kota Gajah	7	34153
18.02.08	Seputih Raman	130.10	45,800	54,030	52,986	Rukti Harjo	14	34155
18.02.07	Terbanggi Besar	217.32	107,389	129,482	125,880	Terbanggi Besar	10 ^{(c)}	34163
18.02.16	Seputih Agung	107.05	45,925	57,479	57,846	Dono Arum	10	34166
18.02.17	Way Pengubuan	214.65	36,851	48,099	47,027	Tanjung Ratu Ilir	8	35213
18.02.13	Terusan Nunyai	300.08	44,362	58,850	52,264	Gunung Batin Ilir	7	34167
18.02.11	Seputih Mataram	116.05	45,638	55,956	56,595	Kurnia Mataram	12	34164
Sub-totals for	Central Sector	1,485.69	532,776	655,261	639,101		116	
18.02.18	Bandar Mataram	1,018.62	72,190	84,621	75,330	Jati Datar	9	34169
18.02.10	Seputih Banyak	136.72	41,627	53,453	51,390	Tanjung Harapan	13	34156
18.02.25	Way Seputih	62.39	16,877	20,744	20,908	Suko Binangun	6	34179
18.02.09	Rumbia	118.47	33,501	41,305	41,367	Reno Basuki	9	34154
18.02.24	Bumi Nabung	97.82	30,734	38,112	37,616	Bumi Nabung Ilir	7	34160
18.02.28	Putra Rumbia	93.45	17,243	22,562	22,304	Binakarya Utama	10	34157
18.02.12	Seputih Surabaya	141.64	44,267	53,600	52,125	Gaya Baru Satu	13	34158
18.02.26	Bandar Surabaya	138.17	32,471	41,514	40,198	Surabaya Ilir	10	34159
Sub-totals for	Eastern Sector	1,807.28	288,910	355,911	341,238		77	
Totals for	Regency	4,559.57	1,170,048	1,460,045	1,408,803	Gunung Sugih	311	

Note: (a) includes the 4 urban villages (kelurahan) of Gunung Sugih (with 7,125 inhabitants as at mid 2024), Gunung Sugih Raya (4,453), Komering Agung (6,588) and Seputih Jaya (6,005).
(b) includes the 3 urban villages (kelurahan) of Adipuro (with 6,442 inhabitants as at mid 2024), Simbar Waringin (5,571) and Trimurjo (3,854).
(c) includes the 3 urban villages (kelurahan) of Bandar Jaya Barat (with 20,204 inhabitants as at mid 2024), Bandar Jaya Timur (16,055) and Yukum Jaya (7,903), all located to the north of Gunung Sugih;
the towns of Terbanggi Besar itself (26,805) and Adi Jaya (14,589) have desa status.

== History ==
In August 2009, a former senior regency official - Herman Hazbullah, former head of the Revenue and Financial Management Agency - was arrested for graft.
