= Mesuji Regency =

Regency in Lampung, Indonesia

Mesuji Regency Kabupaten Mesuji
- Regency
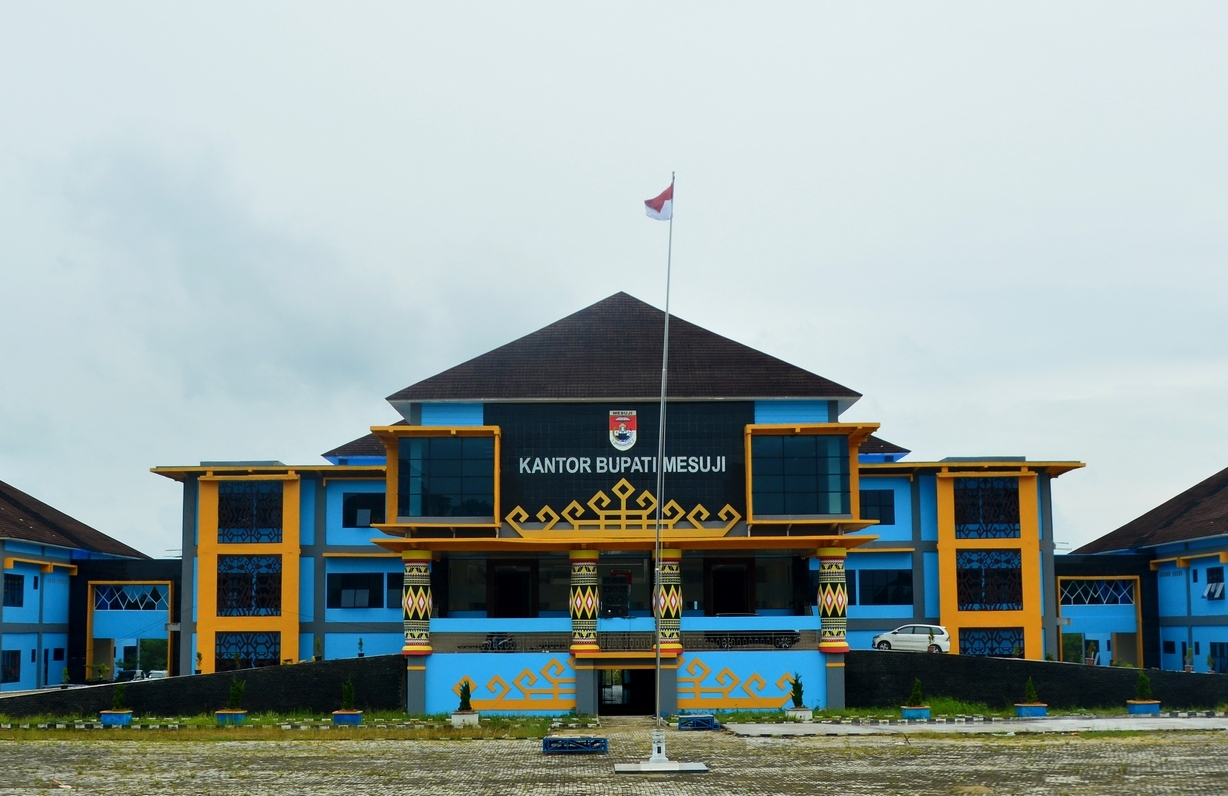
- Regent's office of Mesuji

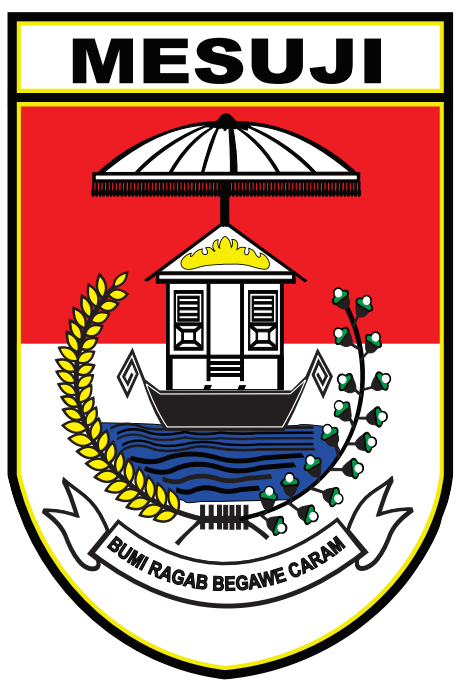
- Coat of arms
- Motto(s): Bumi Ragab Begawe Caram (Land of hard work and mutual cooperation)
- Location within Lampung

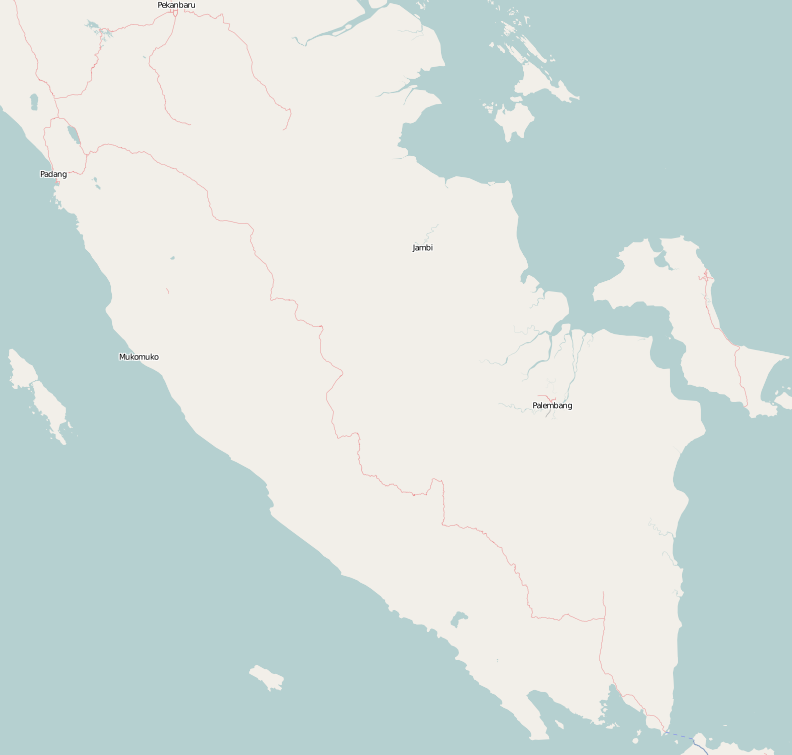
- Location in Southern Sumatra, Sumatra and Indonesia Mesuji Regency (Sumatra) Mesuji Regency (Indonesia)
- Coordinates: 4.0439°S 105.4013°E
- Country: Indonesia
- Province: Lampung
- Regency seat: Wiralaga Mulya

Government
  - Regent: Elfianah Khamamik
  - Vice Regent: Yugi Wicaksono

Area
  - Total: 2,200.51 km^{2} (849.62 sq mi)

Population (mid 2025 estimate)
  - Total: 244,784
  - Density: 111.240/km^{2} (288.109/sq mi)
- Time zone: UTC+7 (IWST)
- Area code: (+62) 726
- Website: mesujikab.go.id

Mesuji Regency is a regency (kabupaten) of Lampung Province, on Sumatra island, Indonesia. It was created on 29 October 2008 from what were previously the most northern districts of Tulang Bawang Regency. It has an area of 2,200.51 km^{2} and a population of 187,286 people at the 2010 census and 227,518 at the 2020 census; the official estimate as of mid 2025 was 244,784 (comprising 125,946 males and 118,838 females). A significant proportion of the inhabitants are Komering people, who are related to the Lampung people. The administrative headquarters of the regency are in the town of Mesuji, situated on the river of the same name.

== Administrative divisions ==
Administratively the regency is divided into seven districts (kecamatan), tabulated below with their areas and their populations at the 2010 census and 2020 census, together with the official estimates as of mid 2025. The table also includes the locations of the district administrative centres, the number of administrative villages in each district (all classed as rural desa), and its post code.

Kode Wilayah	Name of District (kecamatan)	Area in km^{2}	Pop'n 2010 census	Pop'n 2020 census	Pop'n mid 2025 estimate	Admin centre	No. of villages	Post code
18.11.04	Way Serdang	304.03	40,928	45,536	50,071	Bukoposo	20	34694
18.11.05	Simpang Pematang	166.38	23,175	28,995	34,168	Simpang Pematang	13	34699
18.11.06	Panca Jaya	96.27	15,355	18,633	20,934	Adi Luhur	7	34698
18.11.07	Tanjung Raya	357.00	33,949	43,428	49,183	Brabasan	21	34692
18.11.01	Mesuji	267.38	20,036	23,523	24,692	Wiralaga Mulya	11	34697
18.11.02	Mesuji Timur (East Mesuji)	735.29	29,751	39,896	38,430	Tanjung Mas Makmur	20	34695
18.11.03	Rawa Jitu Utara (North Rawa Jitu)	273.76	24,213	27,507	27,306	Panggung Jaya	13	34696
	Totals	2,200.51	187,407	227,518	244,784	Mesuji	105	

== History ==
In November 2010, four people were killed in a cock fight bust-up in the village of Wirabinangun.
