= Kayu Agung, South Sumatra =

Kayu Agung
- Location in South Sumatra and Indonesia Kayu Agung (Indonesia)
- Coordinates: 3°22′34.98″S 104°49′38.72″E
- Country: Indonesia
- Province: South Sumatra
- Regency: Ogan Komering Ilir Regency
- District: Kota Kayu Agung District

Area
  - Total: 86.26 sq mi (223.41 km^{2})
- Elevation: 56 ft (17 m)

Population (mid 2023 estimate)
  - Total: 80,380
  - Density: 931.8/sq mi (359.8/km^{2})
- Time zone: UTC+7 (Indonesia Western Standard Time)

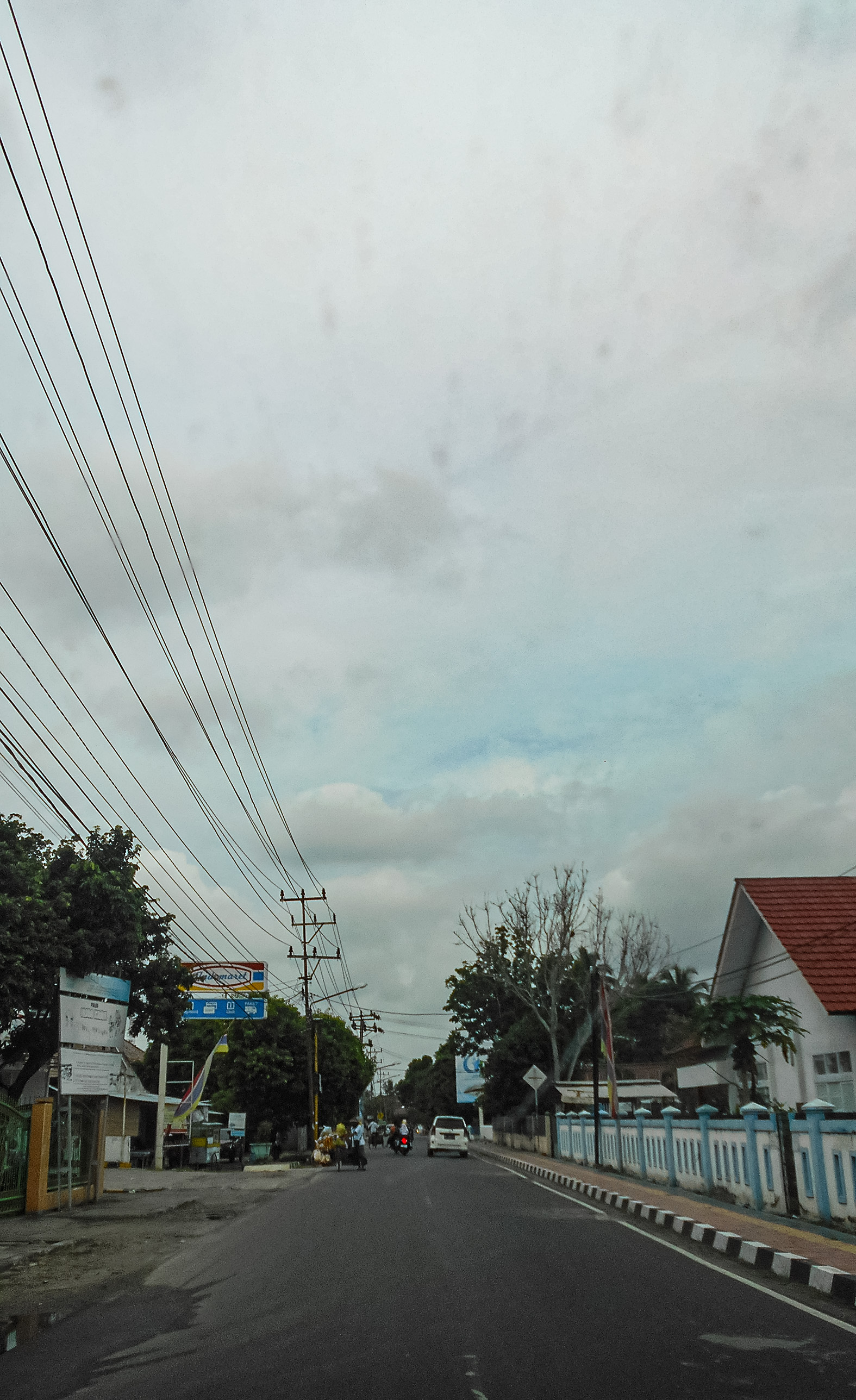
Kapten H. Teguh, a road in the town

Kayu Agung is a town and the capital of Ogan Komering Ilir Regency in South Sumatra province of Indonesia. Its population was 62,694 at the 2010 Census and 75,976 at the 2020 Census; the official estimate as at mid 2024 was 80,380.

== Climate ==
Kayu Agung has a tropical rainforest climate (Af) with moderate rainfall from June to September and heavy to very heavy rainfall from October to May.

Climate data for Kayu Agung
Month	Jan	Feb	Mar	Apr	May	Jun	Jul	Aug	Sep	Oct	Nov	Dec	Year
Mean daily maximum °C (°F)	30.5 (86.9)	30.9 (87.6)	31.3 (88.3)	31.9 (89.4)	32.1 (89.8)	31.7 (89.1)	31.6 (88.9)	32.1 (89.8)	32.3 (90.1)	32.6 (90.7)	31.9 (89.4)	31.1 (88.0)	31.7 (89.0)
Daily mean °C (°F)	26.6 (79.9)	26.8 (80.2)	27.1 (80.8)	27.6 (81.7)	27.7 (81.9)	27.2 (81.0)	26.9 (80.4)	27.2 (81.0)	27.3 (81.1)	27.8 (82.0)	27.4 (81.3)	27.0 (80.6)	27.2 (81.0)
Mean daily minimum °C (°F)	22.8 (73.0)	22.8 (73.0)	22.9 (73.2)	23.3 (73.9)	23.4 (74.1)	22.7 (72.9)	22.2 (72.0)	22.3 (72.1)	22.4 (72.3)	23.0 (73.4)	23.0 (73.4)	22.9 (73.2)	22.8 (73.0)
Average precipitation mm (inches)	336 (13.2)	309 (12.2)	429 (16.9)	276 (10.9)	212 (8.3)	119 (4.7)	104 (4.1)	122 (4.8)	115 (4.5)	177 (7.0)	280 (11.0)	405 (15.9)	2,884 (113.5)
Source: Climate-Data.org
