= Palembangese =

Palembangese may refer to:

- Palembangese people, from Palembang, Indonesia
- Palembangese language, their Austronesian language
- Palembangese cuisine

== See also ==
- Palembang
