= Palembang (disambiguation) =

Palembang is the capital city of the Indonesian province of South Sumatra.

Palembang may also refer to:

- Palembang language, also known as Palembang Malay or Musi, a Malayic language primarily spoken in South Sumatra
- Palembang people, a sub-ethnic group of Malays that inhabit the interior parts of South Sumatra
- Palembang Sultanate, a princely state of Indonesia the southern part of the Indonesian island of Sumatra
- Palembang LRT, light rail transit system of Indonesia
- SS Palembang, Dutch ship sunk during WWI in 1916.

== See also ==
- Palimbang, a municipality in the province of Sultan Kudarat in the Philippines
