= Rupit, South Sumatra =

Coordinates: 2.8016219°S 102.8888574°E

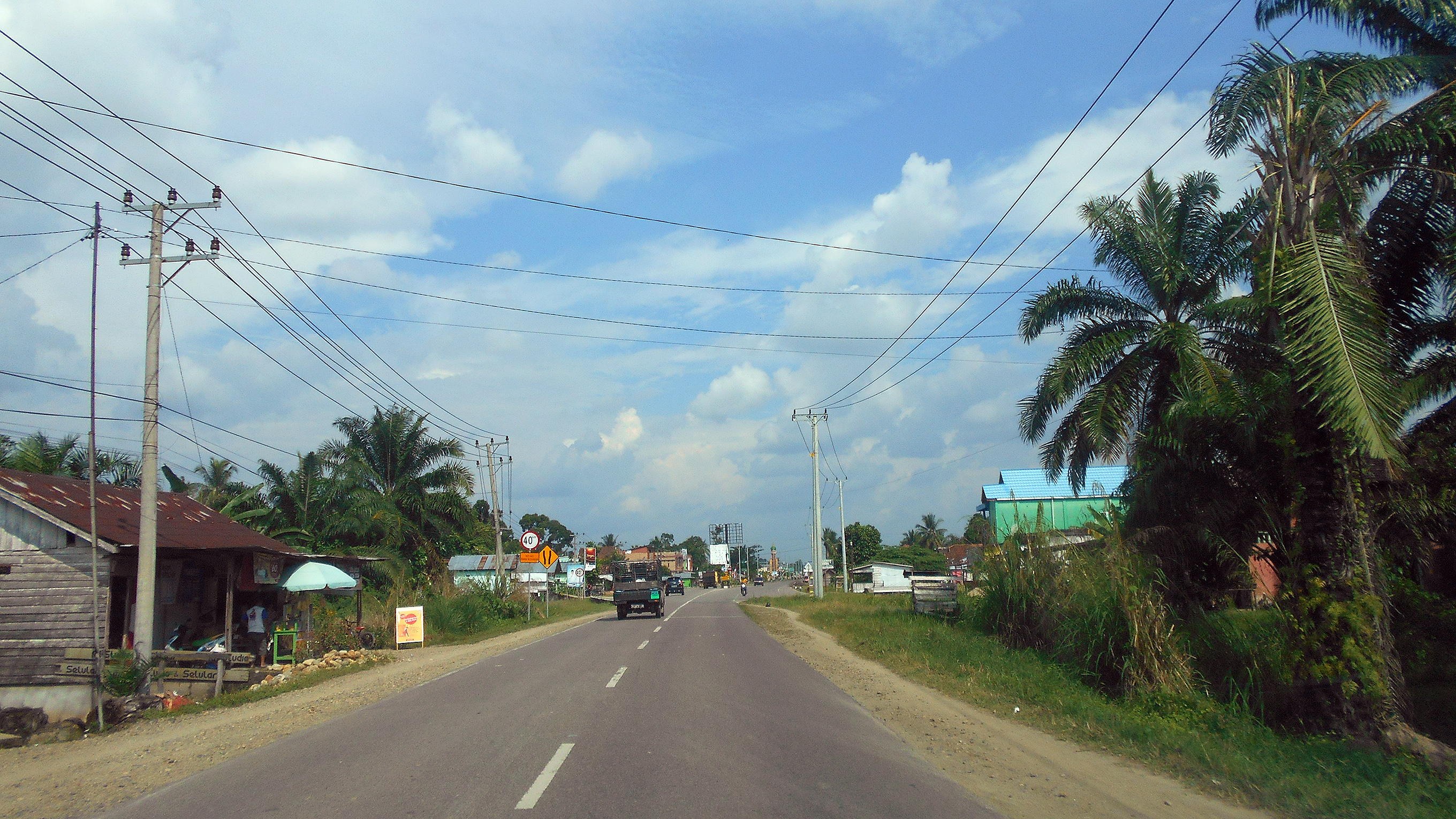
Trans-Sumatran Central Highway in Rupit

Rupit is a town and administrative district (kecamatan) in North Musi Rawas Regency, of South Sumatra province of Indonesia and it is the seat (capital) of North Musi Rawas Regency. The district covers 409.76 km^{2} and had a population of 39,431 according to the official estimates for mid 2024.
