= Tebing Tinggi, South Sumatra =

Tebing Tinggi
- District
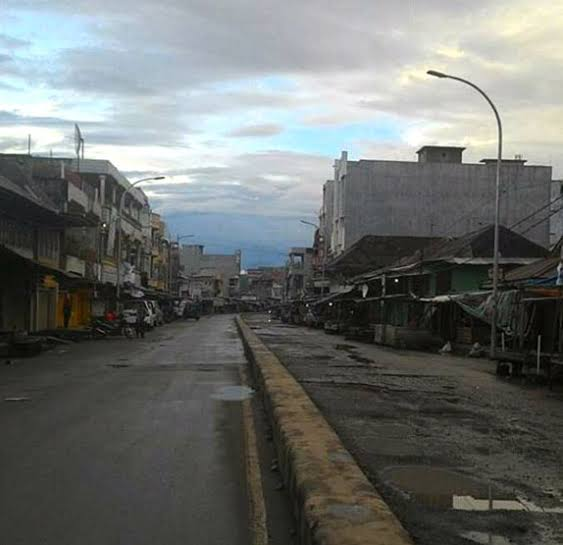
- Traditional Market in Tebing Tinggi

- Location in Sumatra and Indonesia Tebing Tinggi (Indonesia)
- Coordinates: 3.60988°S 103.09911°E
- Country: Indonesia
- Province: South Sumatra
- Regency: Empat Lawang

Government
  - Head of District: Noperman Subhi, S.IP., M.Si

Area
  - Total: 419.17 km^{2} (161.84 sq mi)

Population (mid 2024)
  - Total: 71,735
  - Density: 171.14/km^{2} (443.24/sq mi)
- Time zone: UTC7 (Indonesia Western Time)
- Area code: (+62) 702
- Villages: 26

Tebing Tinggi is a town and administrative district (kecamatan) in Empat Lawang Regency, of South Sumatra province of Indonesia and it is the seat (capital) of Empat Lawang Regency. The total area of Tebing Tinggi District is 419.17 km^{2} (161.84 sq mi). and it had a population of 71,735 according to the official estimate as at mid 2024.
