= Sedekah Rame =

Sedekah Rame is a traditional religious ceremony of the Lahat ethnic group, who settled in the area of South Sumatra. The ceremony is mainly held by farmers in the context of agricultural activities, ranging from paddy weeding, seeding, and planting to harvest.
