= Empat Lawang Regency =

Regency in South Sumatra, Indonesia

Coordinates: 3.2267°N 99.0926°E

Empat Lawang Regency Kabupaten Empat Lawang
- Regency
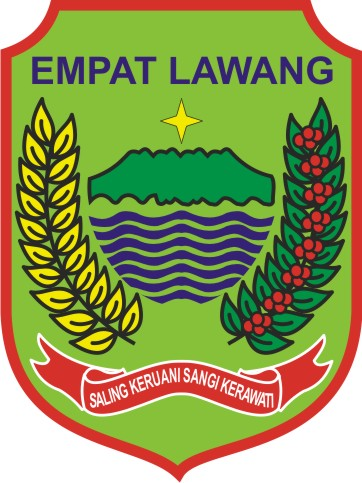
- Coat of arms
- Motto: Saling Keruani Sangi Kerawati
- Location in South Sumatra
- Country: Indonesia
- Province: South Sumatra
- Regency seat: Tebing Tinggi

Government
  - Regent: Joncik Muhammad
  - Vice Regent: Arifa'i

Area
  - Total: 2,256.44 km^{2} (871.22 sq mi)

Population (mid 2025 estimate)
  - Total: 338,444
  - Density: 149.990/km^{2} (388.473/sq mi)
- Time zone: UTC+7 (WIB)

Empat Lawang Regency is a regency of South Sumatra Province, Indonesia. It was created on 2 January 2007 from what had been formerly the western districts of Lahat Regency. It covers an area of 2,256.44 km² and had a population of 221,176 at the 2010 Census and 333,622 at the 2020 Census; the official estimate as at mid 2025 was 338,444 (comprising 174,851 males and 163,593 females). The regency seat is at the town of Tebing Tinggi (not to be confused with towns of the same name elsewhere in Indonesia).

== Administrative districts ==
This Regency when formed was administratively composed of seven districts (kecamatan). Since 2010 three additional districts have been created - Pendopo Barat (from part of Pendopo District), Sikap Dalam (from part of Ulu Musi District) and Saling (from part of Tebing Tinggi District). The ten districts are listed below with their areas (in km^{2}) and their populations at the 2010 Census and 2020 Census, together with the official estimates as at mid 2025. The table also includes the locations of the district administrative centres, the number of administrative villages in each district (totaling 147 rural desa and 9 urban kelurahan), and their post codes.

Kode Wilayah	Name of District (kecamatan)	Area in km^{2}	Pop'n Census 2010	Pop'n Census 2020	Pop'n Estimate mid 2025	Admin centre	No. of villages	Post code
16.11.01	Muara Pinang	193.72	29,285	43,101	43,401	Muara Pinang Baru	22	31592
16.11.05	Lintang Kanan	264.55	23,868	35,334	35,927	Babatan	16	31593
16.11.02	Pendopo	192.86	47,639	54,692	54,883	Pendopo	19 ^{(a)}	31598
16.11.10	Pendopo Barat (West Pendopo)	95.20	^{(b)}	18,266	18,128	Lingge	10	31599
16.11.07	Pasemah Air Keruh	217.90	19,578	30,014	29,694	Nanjungan	15	31595
16.11.03	Ulu Musi	329.62	33,552	25,685	25,175	Padang Tepong	14	31597
16.11.08	Sikap Dalam	230.76	^{(c)}	22,431	21,838	Karang Gede	11	31594
16.11.06	Talang Padang	140.90	11,615	17,782	18,478	Lampar Baru	13	31596
16.11.04	Tebing Tinggi	352.93	55,639	68,484	72,583	Pasar Tebing Tinggi	26 ^{(d)}	31456
16.11.09	Saling	228.00	^{(e)}	17,833	18,337	Suka Kaya	10	31457
	Totals	2,256.44	221,176	333,622	338,444	Tebing Tinggi	156	

Notes: (a) includes 3 kelurahan - Pendopo, Beruge Ilir and Pagar Tengah.
(b) The 2010 population of Pendopo Barat (West Pendopo) District is included in the figure for Pendopo District, from which it was later cut out.
(c) The 2010 population of Sikap Dalam District is included in the figure for Ulu Musi District, from which it was later cut out.
(d) includes six kelurahan - Jayaloka, Kelumpang Jaya, Pancur Mas, Pasar Tebing Tinggi, Tanjung Kupang and Tanjung Makmur.
(e) The 2010 population of Saling District is included in the figure for Tebing Tinggi District, from which it was later cut out.
