= Musi languages =

Group of Malayic languages

Musi
- Native to: Indonesia
- Region: Bengkulu; South Sumatra
- Native speakers: 4,008,000 (2020)
- Language family: Austronesian: Malayo-Polynesian; Malayo-Chamic; Malayic; Musi
- Dialects: Palembang-Lowland; Belide; Palembang; Palembang Lama; Palembang Pasar; Pesisir; Penesak; Lematang Ilir; Upper Musi; Col/Lembak; Musi; Pegagan; Rawas

Language codes
- ISO 639-3: mui
- Glottolog: musi1243
- The distribution of Musi lects across southern Sumatra.

The Musi languages consists of a collection of closely related Malayic varieties spoken in the eastern and northern regions of South Sumatra, as well as parts of Bengkulu. The Musi languages has a relatively high degree of mutual intelligibility, despite its speakers not sharing a unified ethnic identity. Generally, speakers of Malayic varieties in this area refer to their variety (in Indonesian) as bahasa 'language' + [name of region/river/ethnic group], regardless of whether it is classified linguistically as an independent language or a dialect.

== Classification ==
McDowell & Anderbeck (2020) classify the Musi varieties into two main dialect clusters: (1) Upper Musi and (2) Palembang–Lowland, which are further divided into subclusters and dialects, each with its own distinct characteristics. This classification is not purely based on the comparative method, which seeks to reconstruct the direct ancestor of these varieties, but rather on a synchronic dialectological approach. This includes lexicostatistical analysis, the distribution of phonological innovations, and mutual intelligibility testing The classification of the varieties is as follows:

- Palembang–Lowland
  - Palembang
    - Palembang Lama
    - Palembang Pasar
    - Pesisir
  - Lowland
    - Belide
    - Penesak
    - Lematang Ilir
- Upper Musi
  - Col/Lembak
  - Musi
  - Pegagan
  - Rawas

This classification has been adopted with modifications by Glottolog in its latest version (4.8). All ISO 639-3 language codes for Musi varieties were merged into [mui] in 2007 by the Summer Institute of Linguistics, except for the code [liw] for Col. The old codes for Musi language varieties ([plm], [lmt], [pen], [rws]) are no longer actively used but still retain their assigned meanings as defined in the Standard.

== Bibliography ==
- McDowell, Jonathan; Anderbeck, Karl (2020). The Malay Lects of Southern Sumatra. JSEALS Special Publication. Vol. 7. University of Hawai'i Press. hdl:10524/52473.
