= North Musi Rawas Regency =

Regency in South Sumatra, Indonesia

North Musi Rawas Regency Kabupaten Musi Rawas Utara Muratara
- Regency
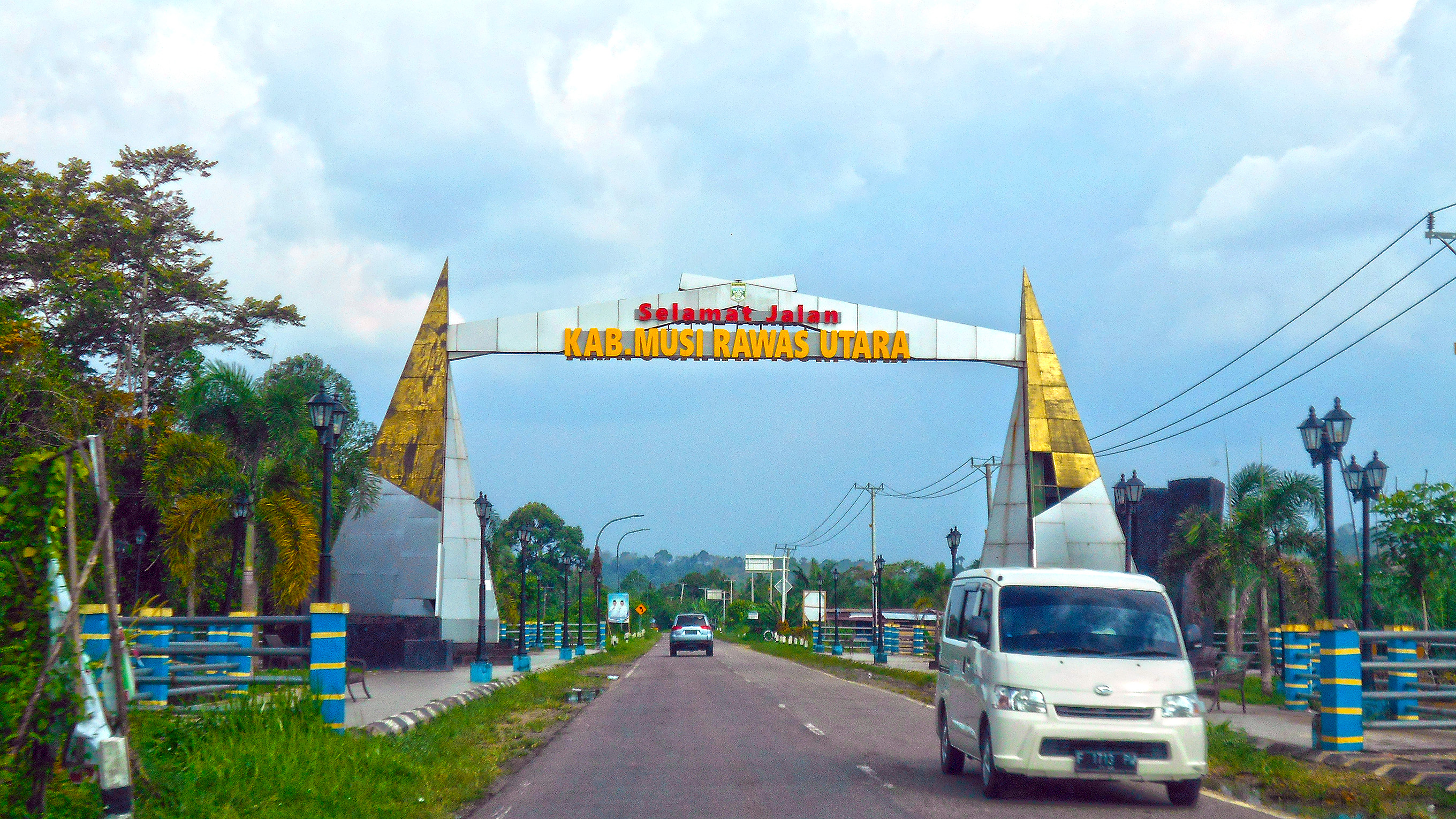
- North Musi Rawas regency border gate

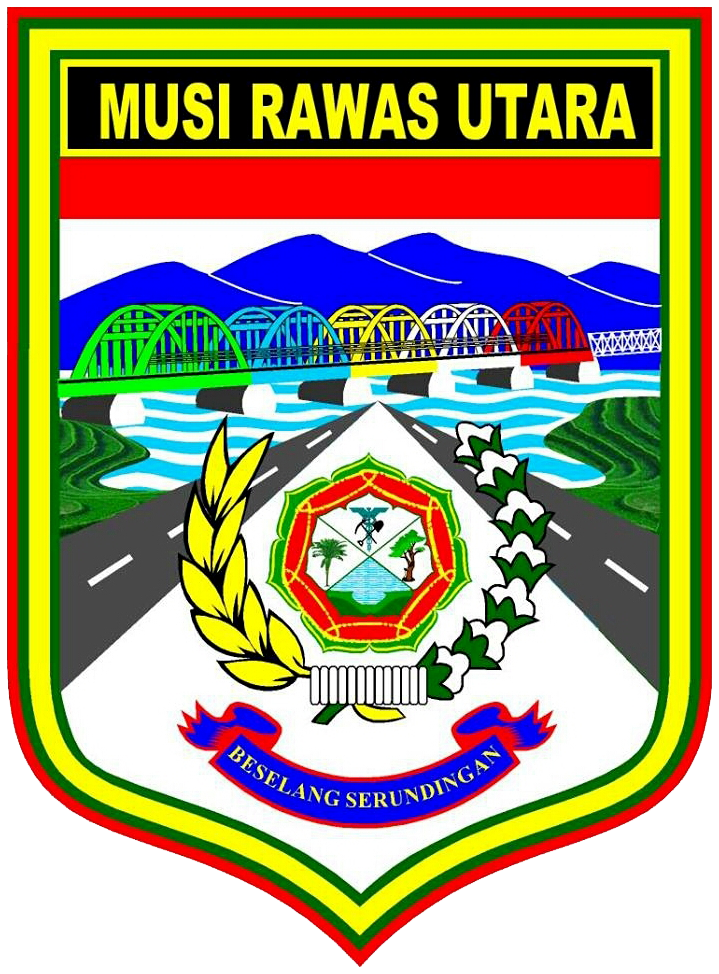
- Coat of arms
- Nickname: Muratara
- Motto: Malay: Berselang Serundingan; Indonesian: Kebersamaan Kesepakatan; English: Togetherness in the one Consensus
- Location of North Musi Rawas Regency in red

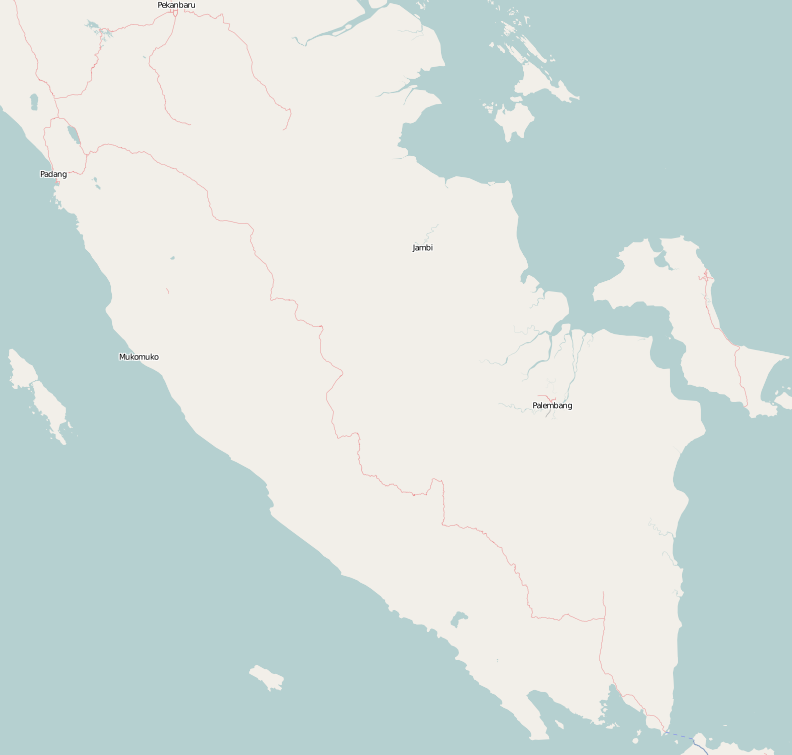
- Location in Southern Sumatra, Sumatra and Indonesia North Musi Rawas Regency (Sumatra) North Musi Rawas Regency (Indonesia)
- Coordinates: 2.4853°S 103.2935°E
- Country: Indonesia
- Province: South Sumatra
- Established: 2013; 13 years ago
- Founded by: Government of Indonesia
- Regency seat: Rupit

Government
  - Type: Regency Government
  - Regent: Devi Suhartoni
  - Vice Regent: Junius Wahyudi

Area
  - Total: 6,008.66 km^{2} (2,319.96 sq mi)

Population (mid 2025 estimate)
  - Total: 205,366
  - Density: 34.1783/km^{2} (88.5215/sq mi)
  - Ethnicity: Malay and Others
- Time zone: UTC+7 (Indonesia Western Standard Time)
- Postcode: 316xx
- Area code: (+62) 733
- Website: muratarakab.go.id/

North Musi Rawas Regency (Indonesian: Kabupaten Musi Rawas Utara, abbreviation Muratara) is a regency of South Sumatra Province, Indonesia. It takes its name from the two main rivers which drain that area, Musi River and Rawas River. This regency was created on 10 June 2013 by splitting off the seven northernmost districts of Musi Rawas Regency.

The new regency borders Jambi province to the north, Musi Banyuasin Regency to the east, Musi Rawas Regency to the south, and Bengkulu province to the west. It covers an area of 6,008.66 km^{2} and had a population of 169,432 at the 2010 Census and 188,861 at the 2020 Census; the official estimate as at mid 2025 was 205,366 (comprising 104,437 males and 100,929 females). The administrative centre is the town of Rupit.

== Administrative districts ==
The new Regency comprises seven of the districts (kecamatan) which were previously part of Musi Rawas Regency. These seven districts are listed below with their areas and their populations at the 2010 Census and 2020 Census, together with the official estimates as at mid 2025. The table also includes the locations of the district administrative centres, the number of administrative villages in each district (a total of 82 rural desa and 7 urban kelurahan), and its post code.

Kode Wilayah	Name of District (kecamatan)	Area in km^{2}	Pop'n Census 2010	Pop'n Census 2020	Pop'n Estimate mid 2025	Admin centre	No. of villages	Post code
16.13.07	Ulu Rawas	1,452.88	10,772	12,034	13,119	Muara Kulam	7	31669
16.13.06	Karang Jaya	1,408.03	27,855	30,191	33,591	Karang Jaya	15	31654
16.13.02	Rawas Ulu	498.17	31,037	33,945	36,015	Pasar Surulangun	17	31656
16.13.01	Rupit	409.76	31,602	37,862	39,729	Muara Rupit	17	31653
16.13.05	Karang Dapo	548.76	17,720	20,302	22,571	Karang Dapo I	9	31658
16.13.04	Rawas Ilir	1,088.13	28,178	28,454	31,218	Bingin Teluk	13	31655
16.13.03	Nibung	602.93	22,268	26,073	29,123	Karya Makmur	11	31667
	Total Regency	6,008.66	169,432	188,861	205,366	Rupit	89	

Note the 7 kelurahan are the seven administrative centres of the districts as shown above. The average area of all 82 villages is 73.26 km^{2} (28.29 sq mi)
