= South Sumatra =

Province in Sumatra, Indonesia

South Sumatra Sumatera Selatan
- Province
- Province of South Sumatra; Provinsi Sumatera Selatan
- Coat of arms
- Nickname: Bumi Sriwijaya "Land of Srivijaya"
- Motto: Bersatu Teguh "Stand Together"
- South Sumatra in Indonesia
- Interactive map of South Sumatra
- Coordinates: 2°45′S 103°50′E
- Country: Indonesia
- Region: Sumatra (Western Indonesia)
- Established: 15 May 1946
- Capital and largest city: Palembang

Government
  - Body: South Sumatran Provincial Government
  - Governor: Herman Deru (NasDem)
  - Vice Governor: Cik Ujang
  - Legislature: South Sumatra Regional House of Representatives (DPRD)

Area
  - Total: 86,771.92 km^{2} (33,502.83 sq mi)
  - Rank: 6th in Indonesia
- Highest elevation (Mount Dempo): 3,173 m (10,410 ft)

Population (mid 2025 estimate)
  - Total: 8,929,515
  - Rank: 9th in Indonesia
  - Density: 102.9079/km^{2} (266.5302/sq mi)

Demographics
  - Ethnic groups (2010): 63.41% Malays; 36.59% others
  - Religion (2024): 96.89% Islam; 1.54% Christianity; 0.97% Protestantism; 0.57% Catholicism; 0.80% Buddhism; 0.77% Hinduism and other
  - Languages and dialects: Official; Indonesian; Regional; Malays (majority) —Palembang Malay —Musi Malay —Belida Malay —Besemah Malay —Col Malay —Enim Malay —Lematang Malay —Lintang Malay —Ogan Malay —Pegagan Malay —Penesak Malay —Rambang Malay —Rawas Malay; Komering; Kubu; Haji
- Time zone: UTC+7 (Indonesia Western Time)
- ISO 3166 code: ID-SS
- Vehicle registration: BG
- GDP (nominal): 2022
- Total: Rp 591.6 trillion (10th); US$ 39.8 billion Int$ 121.5 billion (PPP)
- Per capita: Rp 68.3 million (10th); US$ 4,602; Int$ 14,361 (PPP)
- Growth: ▲5.23%
- HDI (2024): ▲0.738 (21st) – high
- Website: sumselprov.go.id

South Sumatra (Indonesian: Sumatera Selatan, Surat Ulu: ꤼꥈꤸꤳꥎꤽꤼꥎꤾꤳꥐ, Jawi: سومترا سلاتن) is a province of Indonesia, located in the southeast of the island of Sumatra. Notwithstanding the name, it is not the most southern of the provinces on Sumatra island (Lampung is to its south). The capital and largest city of the province is the city of Palembang, and the province covers territory historically administered by the Palembang Sultanate. The province borders the provinces of Jambi to the north, Bengkulu to the west and Lampung to the south, as well having a maritime border with the Bangka Belitung Islands to the east. It is the largest province in the island of Sumatra, and it is slightly smaller than Portugal, the department of Boquerón in Paraguay, the Altai Republic in Russia or the U.S. state of Maine. The Bangka Strait in the east separates South Sumatra and the island of Bangka, which is part of the Bangka Belitung Islands province.

The province has an area of 86,771.92 km^{2} (33,503 sq mi) and had a population of 8,467,432 at the 2020 census; the official estimate as at mid 2025 was 8,837,301 (comprising 4,542,623 males and 4,385,892 females), which was projected to rise to 9,017,142 at mid 2026. The province is rich in natural resources, such as petroleum, natural gas and coal. The province is inhabited by many different Malay sub ethnic groups, with Palembangese being largest ethnic group. Most speak the Palembang language, which is mutually intelligible to both Indonesian and local Palembang Malay. Other ethnic groups include the Javanese, Sundanese, Minangkabau and Chinese. Most are concentrated in urban areas and are largely immigrants from other parts of Indonesia.

== History ==
=== Pre-history ===
South Sumatra has been settled by humans since the Palaeolithic era. The evidence of those settlements is proven by discoveries of Palaeolithic tools in the riverbed of Saling and Kikim rivers in Bungamas Village, Lahat Regency, along with Seventy-eight skeletons dating back to 3,000–14,000 years ago, presumably of Austronesian and Austromelanesoid origins was excavated from the site of Harimau Cave in Padang Bindu Village, Ogan Komering Ulu Regency. Relics of seven stone chambers believed to be about 2,500 years old were found near a coffee plantation in Kotaraya Lembak, Lahat Regency.

=== Srivijaya ===
Expansion of the territory of the Srivijaya Empire

Around 7th century AD, an ancient Buddhist kingdom of Srivijaya was established in an area that's now Palembang. This kingdom became the center of trade and was a maritime power, but this kingdom did not expand its power outside the islands of Southeast Asia, with the exception of contributing to the population of Madagascar as far as 3,300 miles west. Some experts are still debating the area that was the center of the Srivijaya Kingdom. It was likely that the kingdom used to move its administrative center, but the capital remained directly governed by the authorities, while the supporting areas were governed by the local datuk.

In the 7th century, the Chinese noted that there were two kingdoms namely Malayu and Kedah that were part of the Srivijaya empire.

The Srivijaya empire had existed since 671 according to the notes of the Chinese Buddhist monk Yijing. From the Kedukan Bukit inscription in 682, this empire became known under the leadership of Dapunta Hyang. That he departed on the siddhayatra holy journey to "take blessings", and led 20,000 soldiers and 312 people on board with 1,312 soldiers on foot from Minanga Tamwan to Jambi and Palembang. The Kedukan Bukit Inscription is reputed to be the oldest inscription written in Malay. Experts argue that the writer of this inscription adapted Indian orthography.

Based on the Kota Kapur Inscription dated from 686 CE that is found on the island of Bangka, this empire has dominated the southern part of Sumatra, the islands of Bangka and Belitung, to Lampung. This inscription also mentions that Emperor Sri Jayanasa launched a military expedition to punish the Bhumi Jawa kingdom who were not loyal to Srivijaya, this event coincided with the collapse of Tarumanagara in West Java and Holing (Kalingga) in Central Java, which was most likely due to Sriwijaya's attack. It is also possible that the Bhumi Jawa kingdom mentioned in the inscription is referring to the Kingdom of Tarumanegara. Srivijaya continued to grow and succeeded in controlling the maritime trade routes in the Straits of Malacca, the Sunda Strait, the South China Sea, the Java Sea and the Karimata Strait.

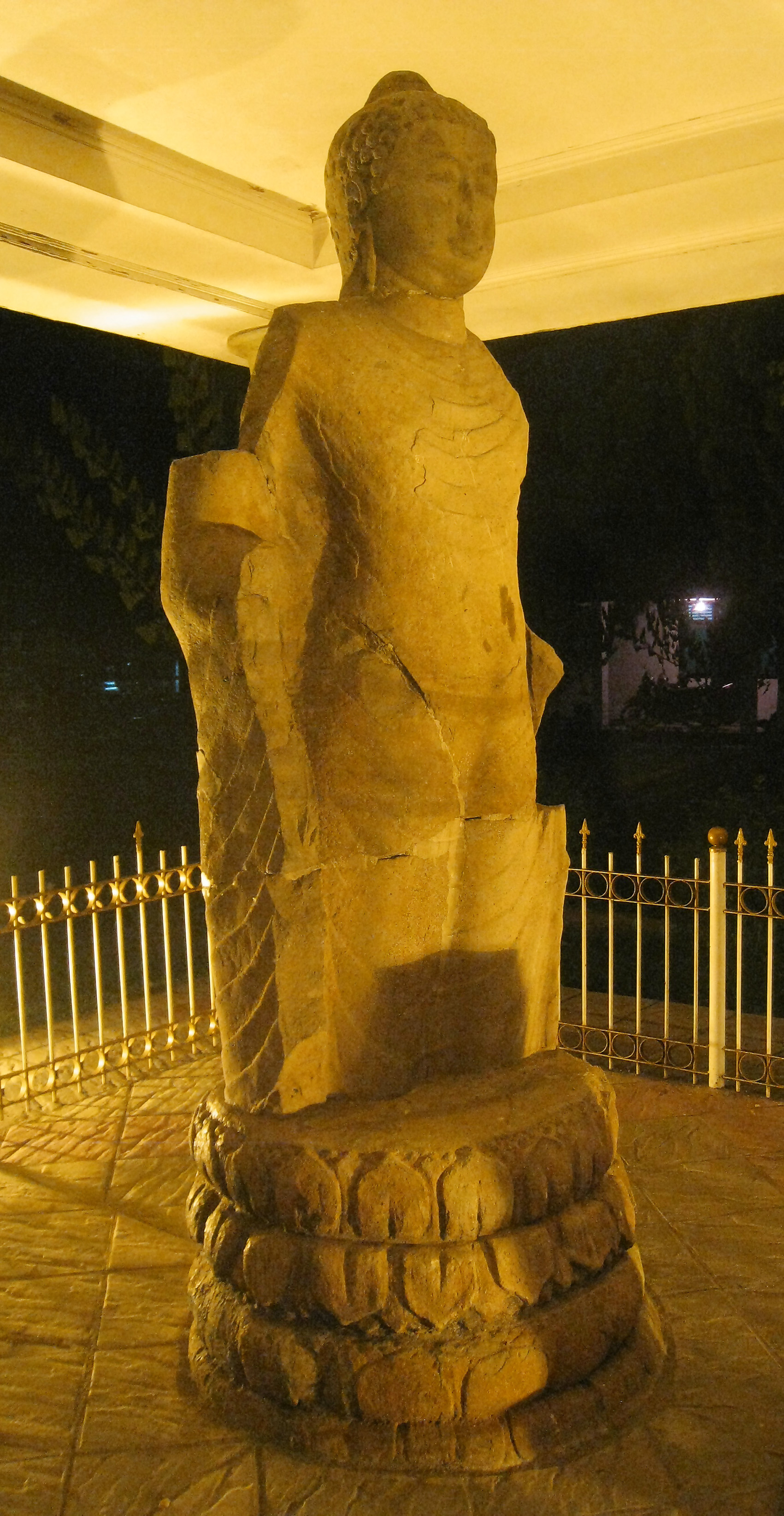
An Amaravati style Buddha statue displayed in Sultan Mahmud Badaruddin II Museum in Palembang, possibly dating from the Srivijaya era

The expansion of this kingdom into Java and the Malay Peninsula, allowed Srivijaya to control the main trade routes in Southeast Asia. Archeologist found the ruins of Srivijaya temples as far as Thailand and Cambodia. In the 7th century, the port of Champa in eastern Indochina began to divert traders from Srivijaya. To prevent this, Maharaja Dharmasetu launched several attacks on coastal cities in Indochina. The city of Indrapura on the banks of the Mekong river was captured by Srivijaya in the early 8th century. Srivijaya continued its domination of Cambodia, until the Khmer king Jayawarman II, founder of the Khmer Empire, severed ties with Srivijaya in the same century. At the end of the 8th century some kingdoms in Java, including Tarumanegara and Holing, were under the rule of Srivijaya. According to records, during this period the Sailendra people migrated to Central Java and ruled there. In the same century, the Langkasuka kingdom in the Malay peninsula became part of the kingdom. In the following period, Pan Pan and Trambralinga, located north of Langkasuka, were also under the influence of Srivijaya.

Based on historical records from Arabia, Srivijaya was called Sribuza. In 955 CE, Al Masudi, a traveler and classical Arab historian wrote about Srivijaya, describing it as a large kingdom that was rich, with many soldiers. Srivijaya's produced camphor, agarwood, cloves, sandalwood, nutmeg, cardamom and gambier. Another note from a Persian expert named Abu Zaid Hasan who received information from Sujaimana, an Arab trader, that the empire was well-advanced in the field of agriculture. Abu Zaid wrote that the kingdom of Zabaj (another Arabic name for Srivijaya) had fertile land and extensive power to the other side of the sea.

Srivijaya controlled the maritime trade route in Southeast Asia throughout the 10th century, but at the end of the century the Kingdom of Medang in East Java grew into a new maritime force and began to challenge the dominance of Srivijaya. The Chinese news from the Song dynasty called the Srivijaya Kingdom in Sumatra the name San-fo-tsi, while the Kingdom of Medang in Java by the name She-po. It is said that San-fo-tsi and She-po were involved in competition for control of Southeast Asia. Both countries sent ambassadors to each other to China. The San-fo-tsi ambassador who departed in 988 was held in Canton when he returned, because his country was attacked by Javanese troops. This attack from Java allegedly took place around the 990s, between 988 and 992 during the reign of Sri Cudamani Warmadewa.

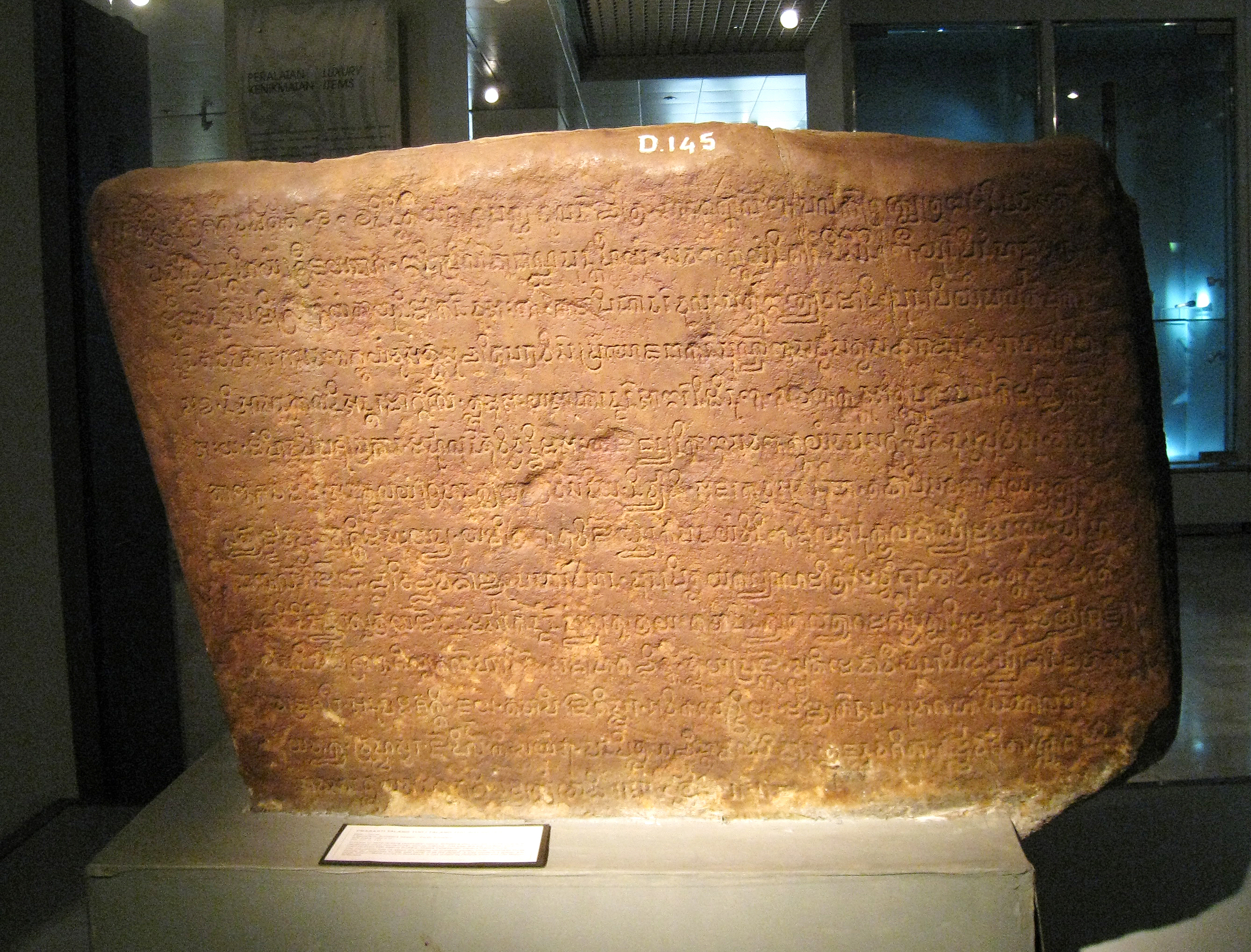
The Talang Tuo inscription dating from the 7th century AD

The kingdom of Medang succeeded in capturing Palembang in 992 for a while, but later the Medang forces were successfully repelled by Srivijaya forces. The Hujung Langit inscription of 997 mentions a Javanese attack on Sumatra. This series of attacks from Java ultimately failed because Java failed to establish a foothold in Sumatra. Capturing the capital city of Palembang was not enough because the Sriwijaya spread itself in several port cities in the Malacca Strait. The Srivijaya emperor, Sri Cudamani Warmadewa, escaped out of the capital and traveled around regaining its strength and reinforcements from his allies and subordinate kings and succeeded in repelling the Javanese navy.

In 1025, the empire was defeated by the Chola Empire (during the period of Emperor Rajendra Chola I) of southern India. The Chola Empire had conquered the Srivijaya colonies, such as the Nicobar Islands region and at the same time succeeded in capturing the ruling Srivijaya king Sangrama Vijayottunggavarman. During the following decades, the entire Sriwijaya empire was under the influence of the Chola dynasty. Rajendra Chola I gave the opportunity to the kings he conquered to remain in power while remaining subservient to him. Srivijaya's capital eventually moved northward to Jambi. This can be attributed to the news of the San-fo-ts'i delegation to China in 1028. Another factor in Sriwijaya's decline was natural factors. Because of the sedimentation of mud on the Musi River and several other tributaries, the merchant ships arriving in Palembang diminished. As a result, the city of Palembang is getting away from the sea and not being strategic. As a result of the coming of the merchant ship, the tax decreased and weakened the economy and position of Sriwijaya.

According to the Chinese Song dynasty book Zhu Fan Zhi, written around 1225 by Zhao Rugua, the two most powerful and richest kingdoms in the Southeast Asian archipelago were Srivijaya and Java (Kediri), with the western part (Sumatra, the Malay peninsula, and western Java/Sunda) under Srivijaya's rule and the eastern part under Kediri's domination. It said that the people in Java followed two religions, Buddhism and the religion of Brahmins (Hinduism), while the people of Srivijaya followed Buddhism. The book described the people of Java as being brave, short-tempered and willing to fight. It also noted their favourite pastimes as cockfighting and pig fighting. The coin used as the currency were made from a mixture of copper, silver, and tin.

Srivijaya remained a formidable sea power until the 13th century. According to George Cœdès, at the end of the 13th century, the empire "had ceased to exist... caused by the simultaneous pressure on its two flanks of Siam and Java." However, there was a power vacuum in the region since there was no prominent power to hold the region except for the waning Majapahit Empire, centered on Java island. The vacuum allowed pirates to flourish in the region.

After being conquered by the Majapahit in 1375 AD, the Palembang region was made a vassal of the Majapahit Empire, under the leadership of Hayam Wuruk. The government in Palembang was handed over to a regent who was appointed directly by the Majapahit. However, internal problems in the Majapahit Empire distracted them from the conquered territories, causing the Palembang region to be controlled by traders from China until the Majapahit regained control of Palembang after sending a commander named Arya Damar.

=== Palembang Sultanate ===
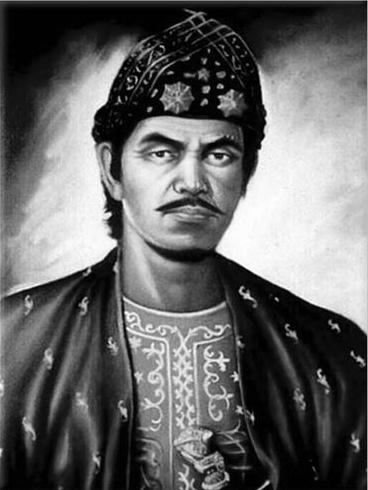
Sultan Mahmud Badaruddin II of Palembang led a revolt against the Dutch in the 19th century. Ultimately, he was defeated and exiled to the Moluccas. Today he is commemorated as the national hero of Indonesia.

By the late 15th century, Islam has spread throughout the region, replacing Buddhism and Hinduism as the dominant religion. Around the early 16th century, Tomé Pires, an adventurer from Portugal, said that Palembang had been led by an appointed patih (regent) from Java who was later referred to the Demak Sultanate and participated in attacking Malacca, which at that time had been controlled by the Portuguese. In 1659, Sri Susuhunan Abdurrahman proclaimed the establishment of the Palembang Sultanate. The Sultanate of Palembang stood for almost two centuries, from 1659 to 1825. Sultan Ratu Abdurrahman Kholifatul Mukminin Sayidul Iman, or Sunan Cinde Walang, was the first king of the Sultanate of Palembang.

The reign of Sultan Muhammad Bahauddin (1776–1803) was known as the golden era of the Palembang Sultanate, the sultanate's economy increased sharply because of trade, including with the VOC. The VOC was upset with Sultan Bahauddin's trade monopoly which caused their contracts to be rejected often. Sultan Bahauddin preferred to trade with Britain, China and Malay people in Riau. The impact of the policy generated enormous wealth for the empire. The Palembang Sultanate was strategically located in conducting trade relations, especially spices with outside parties. The Palembang Sultanate also ruled over the Bangka-Belitung islands which had a tin mine and had been traded since the 18th century.

As the Dutch East India Company increased its influence in the region, the Sultanate started to decline and lost its power. During Napoleonic Wars in 1812, the sultan at the time, Mahmud Badaruddin II rejected British claims to suzerainty. The British, under Stamford Raffles responded by attacking Palembang, sacking the court, and installing sultan's more cooperative younger brother, Najamuddin to the throne. The Dutch attempted to recover their influence at the court in 1816, but Sultan Najamuddin was uncooperative with them. An expedition launched by the Dutch in 1818 and captured Sultan Najamudin and exiled him to Batavia. A Dutch garrison was established in 1821, but sultan attempted an attack and a mass poisoning to the garrison, which were intervened by the Dutch. Mahmud Badaruddin II was exiled to Ternate, and his palace was burned to the ground. The Sultanate was later abolished by the Dutch and direct colonial rule was established.

=== Japanese occupation and independence ===
Southern Sumatra was occupied by the Japanese on January 15, 1942, after the Battle of Palembang in World War II. After the Proclamation of Indonesian Independence, South Sumatra became a part of Sumatra Province as a residency with Adnan Kapau Gani as the resident. On 1 January 1947, the Dutch tried to regain its sovereignty over South Sumatra by invading Palembang and fighting ensued across South Sumatra until Indonesia's independence was recognized by the Dutch on 27 December 1949. The area occupied by the Netherlands in South Sumatra was incorporated into State of South Sumatra under the United States of Indonesia until the disbandment of the union and the founding of the republic.

=== Post-independence division of the province ===
On 12 September 1950, South Sumatra province was established with a territory much larger than it is today, as it encompassed the southern third of Sumatra island covering areas that were eventually formed into separate provinces: Lampung was carved from the southern part of the province on 18 March 1964, Bengkulu from the coastal western part of the province on 18 November 1968, and Bangka Belitung on 4 December 2000.

== Geography ==
South Sumatra has an area of 86,771.92 square kilometres (33,502.83 sq mi) and is located on the island of Sumatra, western Indonesia which lies south of the equator at 1–4 degrees south and 102–108 degrees east. The province is bordered by Jambi to the north, Lampung to the south and Bengkulu to the west, while in the east the Bangka Strait separates the province and the island-province of Bangka Belitung Islands.

On the east coast the land consists of swamps and brackets which are affected by tides. Its vegetation is in the form of palmate plants and mangrove. A little more western is a vast lowland. Far to the west near the border of Bengkulu and Jambi lies the Bukit Barisan mountains, which divides South Sumatra and is a mountainous area with an altitude of 900 to 1,200 metres (3,000 to 3,900 ft) above sea level. Barisan Hill consists of the summit of Mount Seminung (1,964 metres or 6,444 feet asl), Mount Dempo (3,159 metres or 10,364 feet asl), Mount Patah (1,107 metres or 3,632 feet asl), and Mount Bungkuk (2,125 metres or 6,972 feet asl). To the west of Bukit Barisan is a slope. In the Bukit Barisan valley there are areas of rubber, oil palm, and agriculture plantations, especially coffee, tea and vegetables. Mount Dempo is the highest point in the province.

South Sumatra has large rivers that can be navigated, but currently, because of the silting process, cannot be navigated by large ships. Most of the rivers have flows from the Bukit Barisan mountains, except the Mesuji, Lalan and Banyuasin River. Most water from the South Sumatra section of Bukit Barisan mountains flows eastwards into Bangka Strait as Musi River, with Ogan, Komering, Lematang, Kelingi, Lakitan, Rupit River and Rawas River are its major tributaries. A few rivers in South Sumatra flow westwards into Indian Ocean, for example Manna River in Pagaralam and Tanjung Sakti.

In January 2020, two islands in South Sumatra, Betet Island and Gundul Island, were submerged as a result of climate change, and four other islands were close to being submerged.

The province is home to several nature reserves, including Isau-Isau Wildlife Reserve.

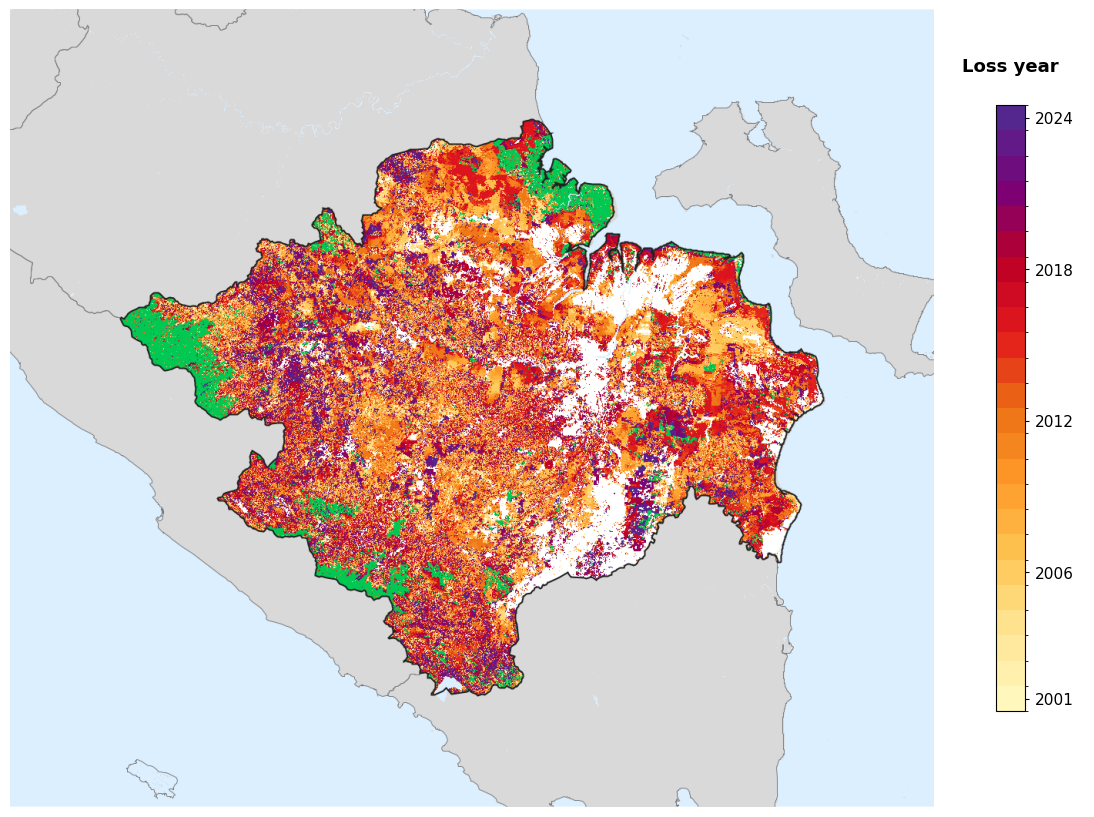
Tree-cover loss year in South Sumatra, 2001-2024, from the Global Forest Change dataset.

As in most other province of Indonesia, South Sumatra has a tropical rainforest climate (Köppen climate classification Af) bordering on a tropical monsoon climate. The climate is very much dictated by the surrounding sea and the prevailing wind system. It has high average temperature and high average rainfall. Throughout the year the province is only affected by two seasons, namely the rainy season and the dry season. The air temperature varies from 24.7 to 32.9 degrees Celsius with air humidity levels ranging from 82% to 88%. The relative rainy season falls from October to April. Variation in rainfall ranges from 2,100 to 3,264 millimetres (83 to 129 in). December is the month with the most rainfall while the drier season usually occurs from June to September.

The climate in South Sumatra is similar to other regions in Indonesia, only known for two seasons, namely the dry season and the rainy season. From June to September southeast winds flow from Australia with relatively less water vapor, resulting in a drier season. Conversely in December to March many wind currents contain water vapor from Asia and the Pacific Ocean during the rainy season. Such conditions occur every half year after passing the transition periods in between April–May and October–November.

== Government and administrative divisions ==
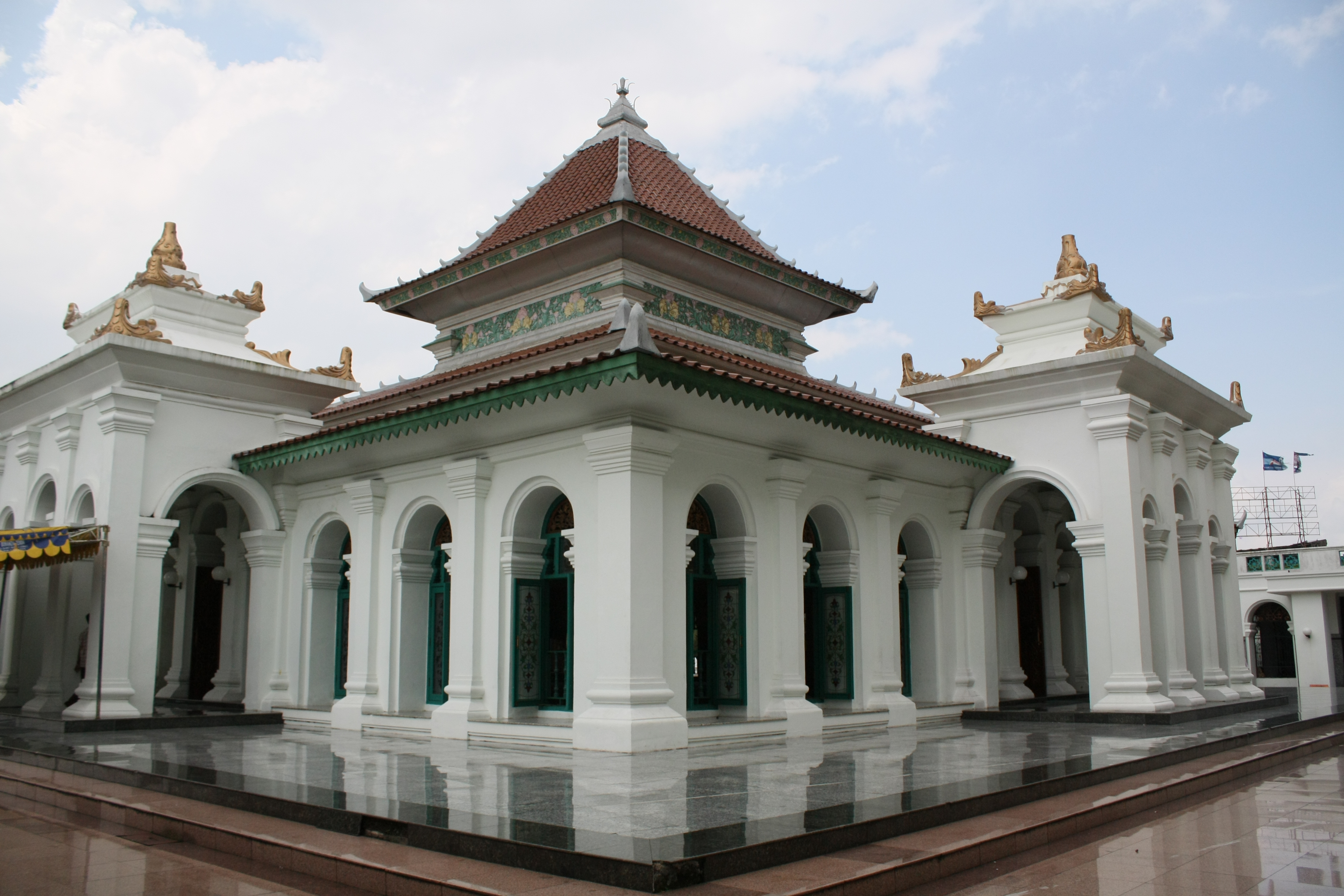
Great Mosque of Palembang. Once the seat of the Srivijaya Empire and the Palembang Sultanate, Palembang remains the capital and economic center of the province.

The capital of South Sumatra province is the city of Palembang. As at 2000 this province was divided into six regencies (kabupaten) - Lahat, Muara Enim, Musi Banyuasin, Musi Rawas, Ogan Komering Ilir and Ogan Komering Ulu - plus the autonomous city (kota) of Palembang. On 21 June 2001 three new autonomous cities were created - Lubuk Linggau from part of Musi Rawas Regency, Pagar Alam from part of Lahat Regency, and Prabumulih from part of Muara Enim Regency. A seventh regency - Banyuasin - was formed on 10 April 2002 from part of Musi Banyuasin Regency; and three further regencies were created on 18 December 2003 - Ogan Ilir from part of Ogan Komering Ilir, and South Ogan Komering Ulu and East Ogan Komering Ulu from parts of Ogan Komering Ulu Regency.

An eleventh Regency - Empat Lawang - was formed on 2 January 2007 from part of Lahat Regency. Two new regencies have subsequently been created by the splitting of existing ones—Penukal Abab Lematang Ilir from part of Muara Enim Regency on 14 December 2012, and North Musi Rawas from part of Musi Rawas Regency on 10 June 2013. All thirteen regencies and the four cities are listed below with their areas and their populations at the 2010 census and 2020 census, together with the official estimates as at mid 2025. It was announced in 2022 that the east-central part of Muara Enim Regency was to be split off to form a fourteenth regency - Rambang Lubai Lematang; however, this has not been enacted by 2026, because of the moratorium maintained since 2013 by the Indonesian Government on the creation of new regencies and cities, so no statistics relating to this latest division are yet available.

Kode Wilayah	Name of City or Regency	Area in km^{2}	Pop'n census 2010	Pop'n census 2020	Pop'n Estimate mid 2025	Capital	HDI 2014 Estimates
16.01	Ogan Komering Ulu Regency	3,774.50	324,045	367,603	386,816	Baturaja	0.662 (Medium)
16.02	Ogan Komering Ilir Regency	17,075.71	727,376	769,348	816,515	Kayu Agung	0.638 (Medium)
16.03	Muara Enim Regency	6,763.91	551,202	612,900	647,936	Muara Enim	0.650 (Medium)
16.04	Lahat Regency	4,333.07	369,974	430,071	455,581	Lahat	0.645 (Medium)
16.05	Musi Rawas Regency	6,122.59	356,076	395,570	415,744	Muara Beliti	0.631 (Medium)
16.06	Musi Banyuasin Regency	14,550.79	561,458	622,206	659,302	Sekayu	0.649 (Medium)
16.07	Banyuasin Regency	12,258.59	750,110	836,914	897,425	Pangkalan Balai	0.632 (Medium)
16.09	South Ogan Komering Ulu Regency (Ogan Komering Ulu Selatan)	3,412.72	318,428	408,981	434,789	Muaradua	0.619 (Medium)
16.08	East Ogan Komering Ulu Regency (Ogan Komering Ulu Timur)	4,369.25	609,982	649,853	680,094	Martapura	0.667 (Medium)
16.10	Ogan Ilir Regency	2,302.86	380,904	416,549	441,183	Indralaya	0.644 (Medium)
16.11	Empat Lawang Regency	2,234.10	221,176	333,622	348,974	Tebing Tinggi	0.631 (Medium)
16.12	Penukal Abab Lematang Ilir Regency	1,842.56	165,474	194,900	208,032	Talang Ubi	0.598 (Low)
16.13	North Musi Rawas Regency (Musi Rawas Utara)	5,937.80	169,432	188,861	200,799	Rupit	0.613 (Medium)
16.71	Palembang City	352.52	1,455,284	1,668,848	1,729,843	Palembang	0.760 (High)
16.74	Prabumulih City	447.31	161,984	193,196	205,905	Prabumulih	0.722 (High)
16.72	Pagar Alam City	625.91	126,181	143,844	150,533	Pagaralam	0.647 (Medium)
16.73	Lubuk Linggau City	367.73	201,308	234,166	249,054	Lubuklinggau	0.728 (High)

The province comprises two of Indonesia's 84 national electoral districts to elect members to the People's Representative Council. The South Sumatra I Electoral District consists of 4 of the regencies in the province (Musi Rawas, Musi Banyuasin, Banyuasin and North Musi Rawas), together with the cities of Palembang and Lubuk Linggau, and elects 8 members to the People's Representative Council. The South Sumatra II Electoral District consists of the remaining 9 regencies (Ogan Komering Ulu, Ogan Komering Ilir, Muara Enim, Lahat, East Ogan Komering Ulu, South Ogan Komering Ulu, Ogan Ilir, Empat Lawang and Penukal Abab Lematang Ilir), together with the cities of Pagar Alam and Prabumulih, and elects 9 members to the People's Representative Council.

== Demographics ==
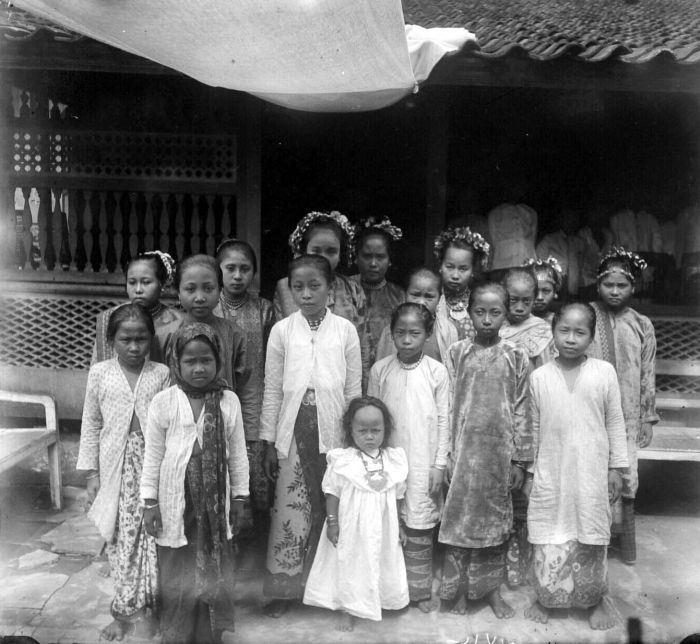
Musi girl with traditional clothes during the colonial era

=== Ethnic groups ===
The province has no clear ethnic dominance, though the indigenous Musi-speaking Palembang have a plurality, followed by the Javanese, most of whom have been recent migrants from Java as part of the government-sanctioned transmigration project created to balance the population, especially from the highly overpopulated Java island; as a result, Javanese is also widely spoken and understood, especially in areas with a high population of transmigrants, for example Belitang. Forming the next largest group is the other Malayic-speaking populations as well as the Komering, a distinct Malayo-Polynesian people related to the native Lampungese from neighboring Lampung Province. Minangkabau, Chinese, and Sundanese also form minorities in the province.

The Palembang people are the majority in this province, divided into two groups: Wong Jeroo is a descendant of nobility and is slightly lower than the courtiers from the past kingdom based in Palembang, and Wong Jabo is a commoner. The Palembang people were the descendants of Malays, Arabs, Chinese, Javanese and other ethnic groups in Indonesia. The Palembang people themselves have two different languages, namely Baso Palembang Alus and Baso Palembang Sari-Sari. Many of the Palembang people still live in houses built over water. The architectural model of the Palembang house which is most typical is the rumah limas which is mostly erected on stilts on the water to protect from flooding that continues to occur until now. In the Musi river area, Palembang people often offer their wares on boats.

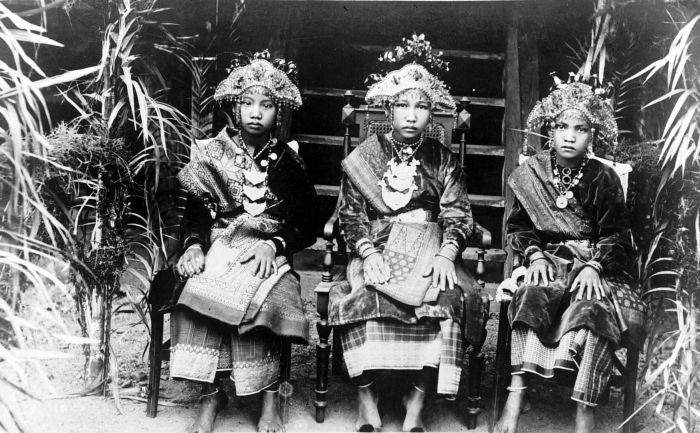
Three Komering girls in 1929

The Komering are another of the major cultural groups in South Sumatra, located along the Komering River. Like other ethnic groups in South Sumatra, the characteristic of the Komering is that of explorers so that their spread is quite extensive, reaching as far as Lampung. The Komering people are divided into two major groups: Komering Ilir who lives around Kayu Agung and Komering Ulu who live around the city of Baturaja. The Komering people are divided into several clans, including the Paku Sengkunyit clan, Sosoh Buay Rayap clan, Peliyung Pemuka Buay clan, Bu Madang clan, and the Semendawai clan. The area of Komering culture is the most extensive area compared to the cultural areas of other tribes in South Sumatra. In addition, when viewed from the character of the people, the Komering people are known to have a high and hard temper. Based on folklore in the Komering community, the ancestor of the Komering people and the ancestor of the Batak people in North Sumatra, are said to be still brothers. The brothers who came from across the country. After arriving in Sumatra, they separated. The older brother went south to become the ancestor of the Komering people, and the younger brother to the north became ancestor of the Batak people.

The Semendo people live in the Semendo District of Muara Enim Regency. Historically, the Semendo people came from the descendants of the Bantenese people who, in the past few centuries, traveled from Java to the island of Sumatra, and later settled and gave birth to children in the Semendo area. Nearly 100% of the Semendo population depend on agricultural products, which are still processed in traditional ways. Agricultural land in this area is quite fertile, because it is approximately 900 meters above sea level. There are two main commodities from this area: Robusta coffee with a total production of 300 tons per year, and rice, where this area is one of the rice barns for the area of South Sumatra. Customs and culture of this region are strongly influenced by the strong Islamic breath. Starting from tambourine music, folk songs and dances are strongly influenced by the Malay culture and Islamic culture. The language used in everyday life is the Semendo language.

=== Language ===
While Indonesian is the official language in the province, most of the Malays speak a dialect of the Malay language called the Palembang Malay or Musi. Currently, Palembang Malay has become the lingua franca in the region. Palembang Malay originated from the Old Malay language which blends with Javanese and is pronounced according to the accent of the Palembang people. Moreover, this language has absorbed words from Arabic, Urdu, Persian, Chinese, Portuguese, English and Dutch, because Palembang was once a large trading city, attracting various kinds of merchants from various places. In the past, Palembang Malay was written with the Jawi script, a modified version of the Arabic script. Nowadays, the user of the Jawi script is diminishing and being replaced by the Latin script.

Palembang Malay consists of two register, first is the everyday language that is used almost by everyone in the city or also called the bahasa pasar (market language). Secondly is the polite and formal style (Bebaso), which is used by limited circles, such as sultans and nobility. Usually spoken by and for people who are respected or who are older. As used by children to parents, daughter-in-law to parents-in-law, students to teachers, or between speakers of the same age as the purpose of mutual respect, because Bebaso means to speak politely and subtly.

However, migrants often use their local language as a daily language, such as Komering, Rawas, Musi and Lahat. Migrants from outside South Sumatra sometimes also use their local language as a daily language in their families or regional communities. However, to communicate with other Palembang residents, residents generally use the Palembang Malay as their daily language of instruction. In addition to the indigenous people, in Palembang there are also migrants and descendants, such as from Java, Minangkabau, Madura, Bugis and Banjar. Many descendants living in Palembang are Chinese, Arabs and Indian.

Indonesian is generally used as a second language and also as the language of education and for official purposes.

=== Religion ===
The people of the province, as with other parts of Sumatra with the exception of Bangka Belitung and North Sumatra provinces, overwhelmingly follow the Shafi'i school of law of Sunni Islam. The religion is mainly adopted by the ethnic Malays, Javanese, Minangkabau, and Sundanese. Other minority religions are also practiced; the Chinese primarily follow Mahayana Buddhism and Christianity.

As of 2022, Islam is the largest religion in South Sumatra, being practised by 97.59% of the population. Minority religions are Christianity (Protestant and Roman Catholic) with 2.34%, Buddhism 0.06%, and others (including Folk religion, Hinduism and Confucianism) 0.01% of the population.

== Culture ==
Like most other provincial cultures on the island of Sumatra, the culture of the province of South Sumatra is largely influenced by Malay culture. In addition, there are some cultures that are influenced by Islam, and some are influenced by the greatness of the Srivijaya kingdom. South Sumatra's cultural wealth includes traditional houses, traditional clothing, various types of dances, religious ceremonies such as Sedekah Rame, as well as typical food from the area. The cultural wealth of South Sumatra is not only popular within the South Sumatra region itself.

In all corners of Indonesia, various South Sumatran cultures are well-known, even popular with many people. An example is the rumah limas traditional house, this house has been adopted by many people in various regions because the construction is not complicated. In addition, songket weaving is also a distinctive fabric favored by many people. The South Sumatran signature food, Pempek, can not only be found in the city of Palembang and the surrounding area, but also has spread throughout Indonesia as well as neighbouring countries such as Singapore and Malaysia.

=== Traditional house ===
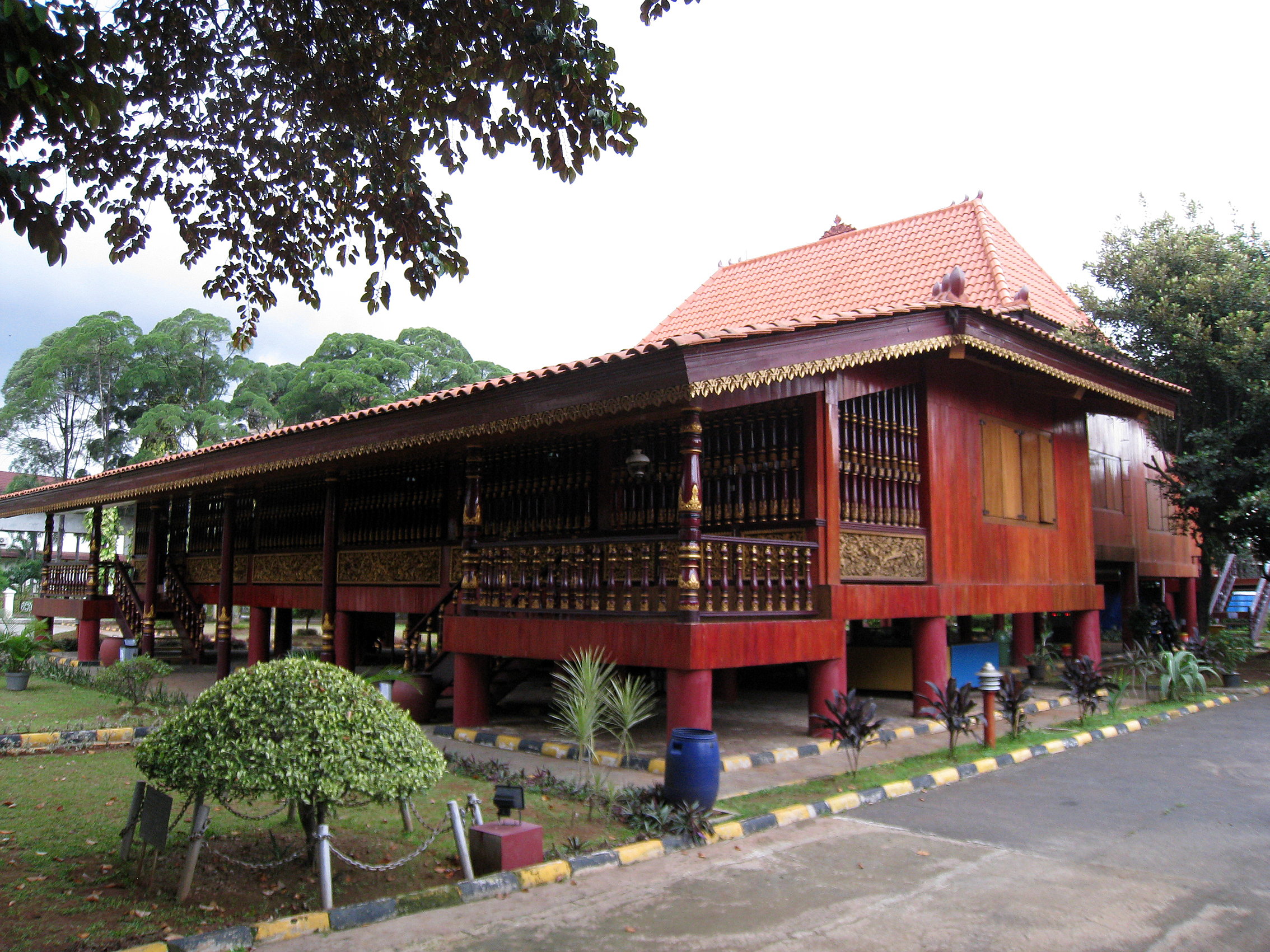
Rumah limas, the traditional house of South Sumatra

Rumah limas is a traditional house in the province of South Sumatra. The architecture of this traditional house is influenced by Islamic culture and Malay culture. Although this traditional house originated from South Sumatra, it has influenced the construction of other traditional houses in the other places.

The rumah limas traditional house has an area of between 400 and 1000 square meters. The whole house, resting on wooden pillars that were slung on the ground. The rumah limas is divided into several parts, namely the main room pangkeng (bedroom), and pawon (kitchen). The main room is located at the top level and right under the limas roof. In this room there is an amben or a conference room. This room is located in the center of the rumah limas, both for customary and decorative purposes. The pangkeng section is a bedroom. This section of space is on the right or left side. To enter the pangkeng room, it must be done by passing a box-shaped door cover. The box serves as a storage area for various tools.

On the back is the pawon. pawon is part of the kitchen of this traditional house. The word pawon is actually not only known in South Sumatra. The Javanese people, besides adapting the Limas house shape, also recognize the word pawon to mention the position of the kitchen in their home.

=== Traditional clothes ===
South Sumatra's traditional clothes are known by the name Aesan gede, symbolizing greatness, and Aesan paksangko which that symbolizes the elegance of the people of South Sumatra. These traditional clothes are usually only used during traditional wedding ceremonies. With the understanding that this marriage ceremony is a big ceremony. By using Aesan Gede or Aesan Paksangko as a bridal costume it means something very elegant because the bride and groom are portrayed as kings and queens. The difference between Aesan Gede and Aesan Paksongko patterns, if detailed as follows; Pink Gede style combined with golden color. Both colors are believed to reflect the majesty of the Sriwijaya nobles. Especially with the glittering of complementary jewelry and the crown of Aesan Gede, bungo cempako, kembang goyang, and the standard kelapo. Then they are combined with dodot clothes and lepus songket cloth patterned in silver for the Aesan Paksangkong. For men using gold embroidered songket lepus, robes of gold flower motifs, songket sling, sleeves, and golden songkok worn on the head. And for women using lotus, red noble brackets studded with golden star flowers, lepus songket cloth embroidered with gold, and headdress in the form of Aesan Paksangkong crown. Also not to forget the clothes decorating clothes such as jewelry with golden images, stand-by dress, rocking flowers, and kenango flowers.

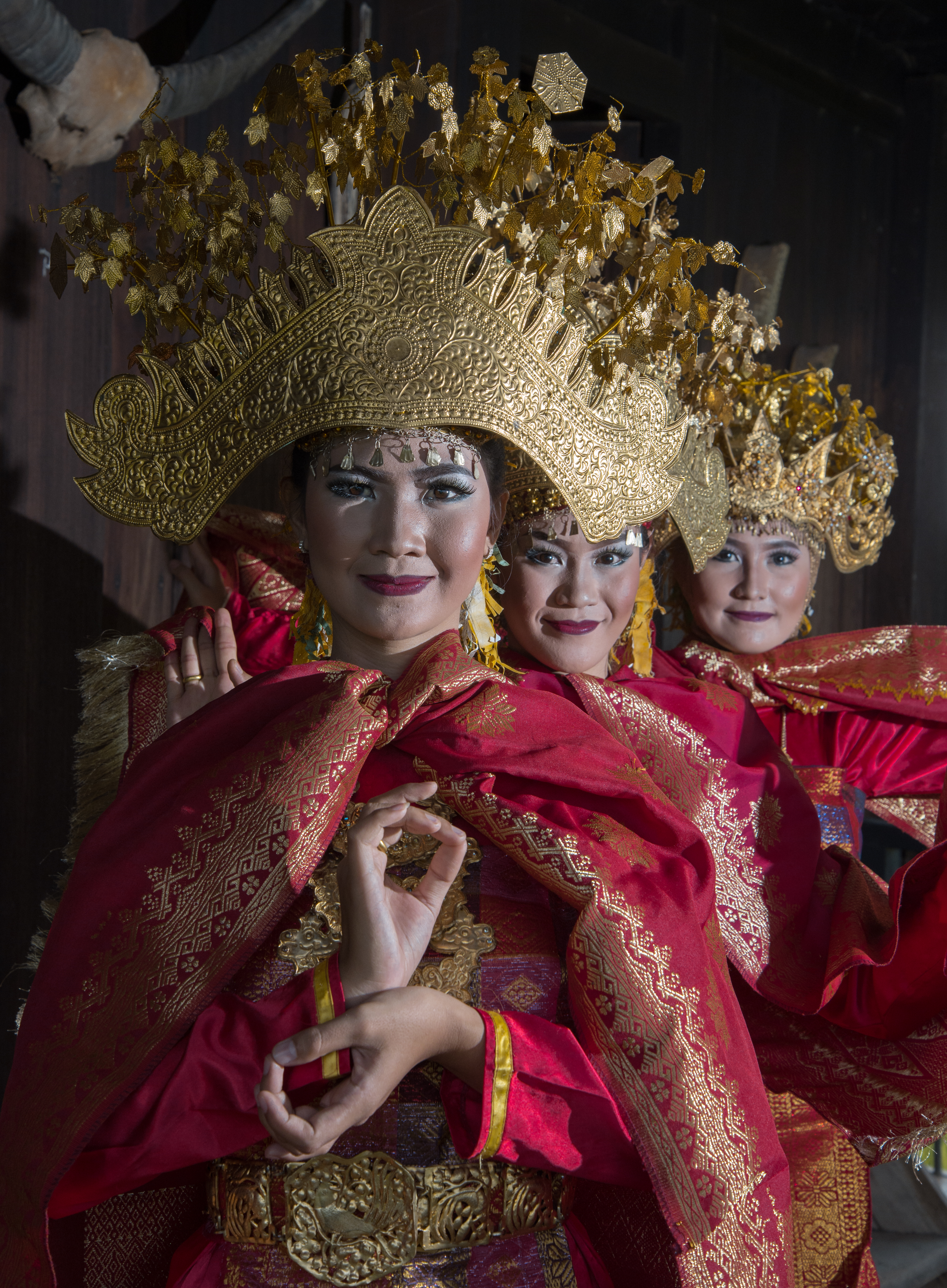
Kebagh dance from Pagar Alam, South Sumatra

=== Traditional dance ===
Gending Sriwijaya is a regional song and also a fairly popular dance from Palembang. This Gending Sriwijaya song was performed to accompany the tarian Gending Sriwijaya dance. Both songs and dances depict the nobility of culture, glory, and the majesty of the former Srivijaya Empire which once triumphed in uniting the western Nusantara. This Sriwijaya Gending dance from South Sumatra was performed to welcoming honored guests. Usually, this dance is performed by as many as thirteen dancers, consisting of nine core dancers and four companions and singers.

Tanggai dance or tari Tangga is a traditional dance from South Sumatra that is also dedicated to welcoming honored guests. In contrast to Gending Sriwijaya dance, Tanggai dance is performed by five people wearing local clothing such as songket, dodot, pending, necklaces and other decorations. This dance is a combination of graceful motion with typical regional clothing. This dance describes the people of Palembang who are friendly and respectful, respecting and loving guests visiting their area.

Tenun songket dance or tarian tenun songket is a reflection of the daily lives of housewives and young women in South Sumatra. In their daily lives, housewives and young women do work in the form of songket weaving which is a special fabric of their region. Aside from being an effort to preserve traditional dances, this dance is at the same time as a promotion of their regional special fabrics, namely songket.

=== Traditional weapon ===
The first traditional South Sumatra weapon and often a cultural icon of the province is the trident, or locally known as trisula. This spear is shaped like a wooden spear with 3 sharp eyes at the end. The spear length is as high as an adult, which is around 180 cm and used to be used by Srivijaya royal warriors as the main weapon. Kris is not only used by the people of Java. Some other sub-ethnic Malays also recognize this type of weapon in their culture, including the people of South Sumatra. Although it has the same shape, the South Sumatra kris has its own characteristics. The number of curves or curves is always an odd number between 7 and 13 with a wide angle. That is why the typical South Sumatra kris tends to be longer and taper. Skin is a traditional South Sumatra weapon which is thought to originate from acculturation of local culture to the culture of Chinese traders and East Asia in the past. This weapon looks like a typical West Sumatra Kerambit, but is smaller in size and has 2 sharp blades.

== Transport ==
Many forms of transportations are available in the province. As a province traversed by several large rivers, the people of South Sumara also recognize the importance water transport, which is called ketek. This ketek serves river crossings through various piers along the Musi, Ogan and Komering Rivers.

There are three public operational airports in the province, with the Sultan Mahmud Badaruddin II International Airport in Palembang being the largest and the busiest in the province. This airport is located northwest of Palembang, serving both domestic and international flights. The airport is also a hajj embarkation for residents of South Sumatra. Domestic flights are served to and from Jakarta, Bandung, Batam, Pangkal Pinang and other cities, as well as international destinations such as Singapore and Kuala Lumpur in Malaysia. The other two airports are the Silampari Airport in Lubuklinggau and the Atung Bungsu Airport in Pagar Alam; these two airports only serve regional flights.

South Sumatra also has three main ports namely Boom Baru, Port 36 Ilir and Tanjung Api-Api. These three ports serve passenger transportation using ferries to Muntok (Bangka) and Batam. Currently the Tanjung Api-Api Port is being built which serves the transportation of passengers and goods in and out of South Sumatra.

Transportation in South Sumatra

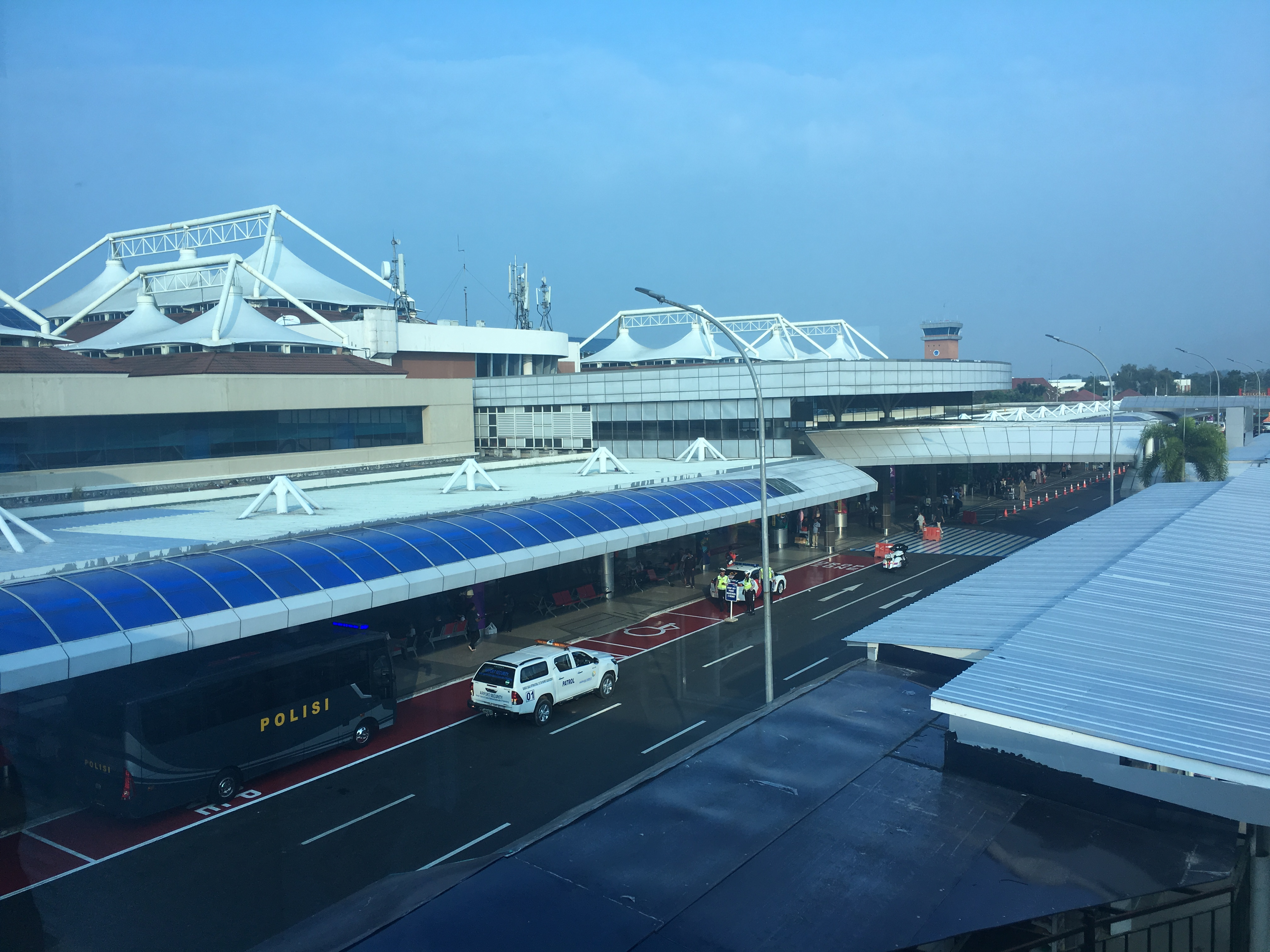
Sultan Mahmud Badaruddin II International Airport is the most important airport of the province, serving the capital, Palembang

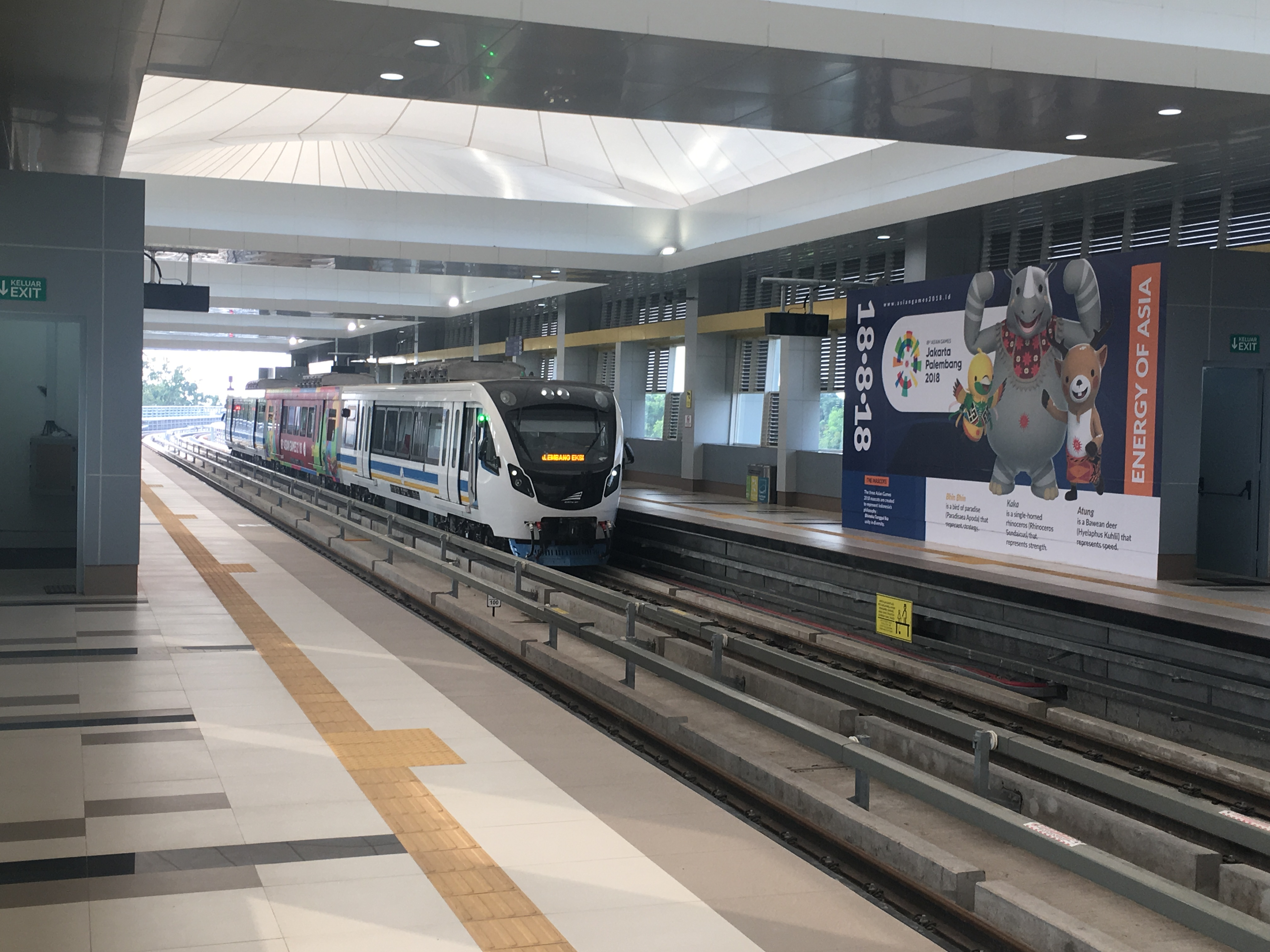
Palembang Light Rail Transit takes passengers from the airport to Palembang

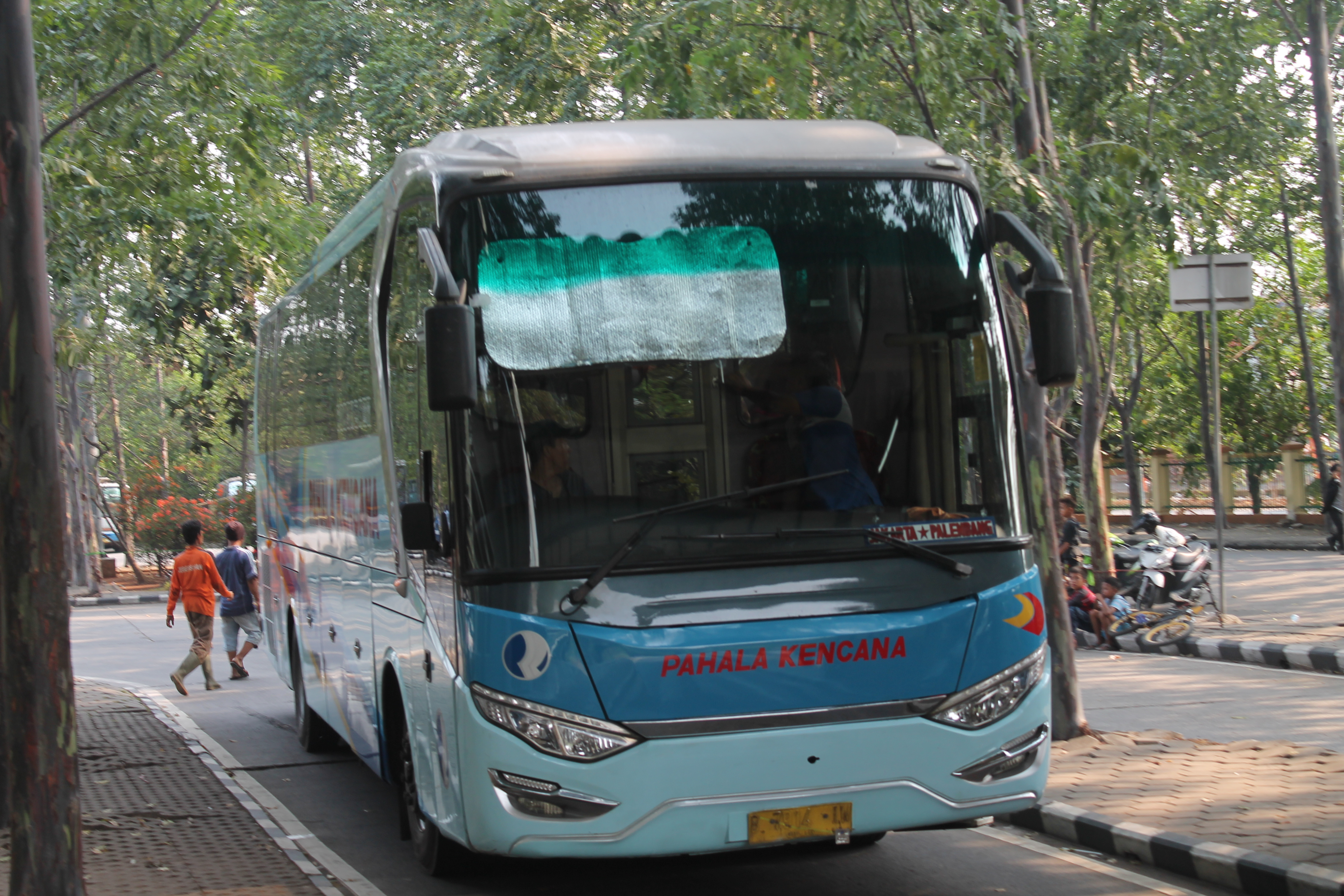
A local bus in South Sumatra

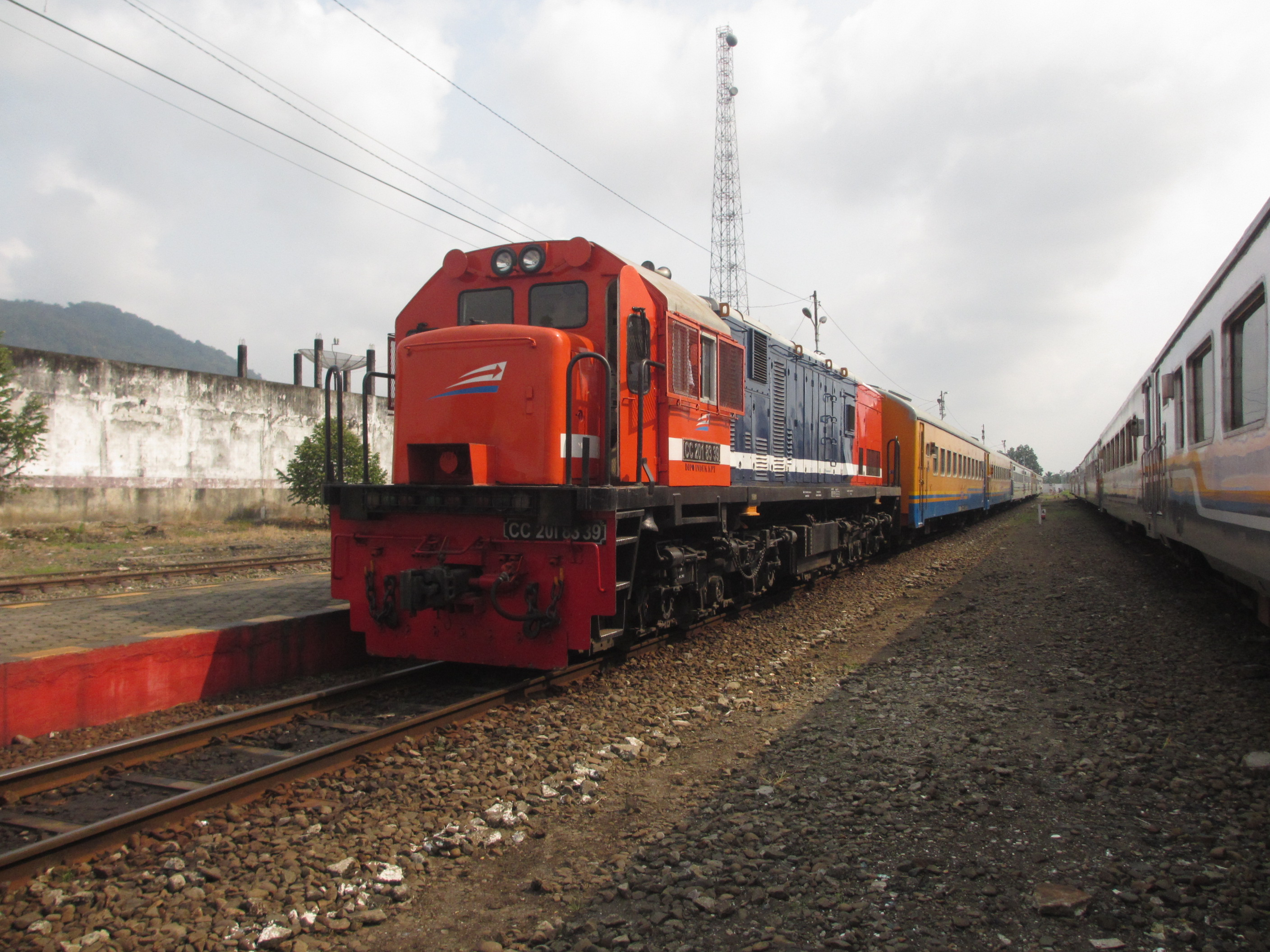
An intercity train bound for Palembang at Lubuklinggau railway station

In addition, there are several railway lines in the province. Kertapati railway station in Palembang is the largest station in the province. It serves trains to and from Lubuklinggau and Bandar Lampung in Lampung province, and also smaller towns such as Baturaja, Lahat and Prabumulih. Currently, the railway only terminates in Lubuklinggau, but there is a plan to construct a railway to Bengkulu, which would allow to boost passengers movement and economic growth. Moreover, a railway from Palembang to Betung in Jambi is also in the planning stage, which would be connected further to Riau and North Sumatra. Overall, these projects would form the backbone of the Trans-Sumatra Railway.

The Palembang Light Rail Transit started operating in August 2018. It is one of its first kind in Indonesia and it is used to carry passengers from the Sultan Mahmud Badaruddin II International Airport to the Palembang city center.

Currently, the only toll road in South Sumatra is the 22 km Palembang-Indralaya toll road. However, in the masterplan of the Trans-Sumatra Toll Road, the province would be connected by toll roads to other provinces like Bengkulu, Jambi and Lampung. Construction of the Bakauheni-Bandar Lampung-Palembang toll-road is predicted to be finished by late 2019, while the Palembang-Betung-Jambi toll-road and the Lubuklinggau-Bengkulu toll-road is still in planning stage.

== Economy ==
South Sumatra GDP share by sector (2022)
1. Agriculture (13.2%)
2. Manufacturing (17.5%)
3. Other Industrial (10.9%)
4. Mining and Quarrying (27.6%)
5. Service (30.8%)

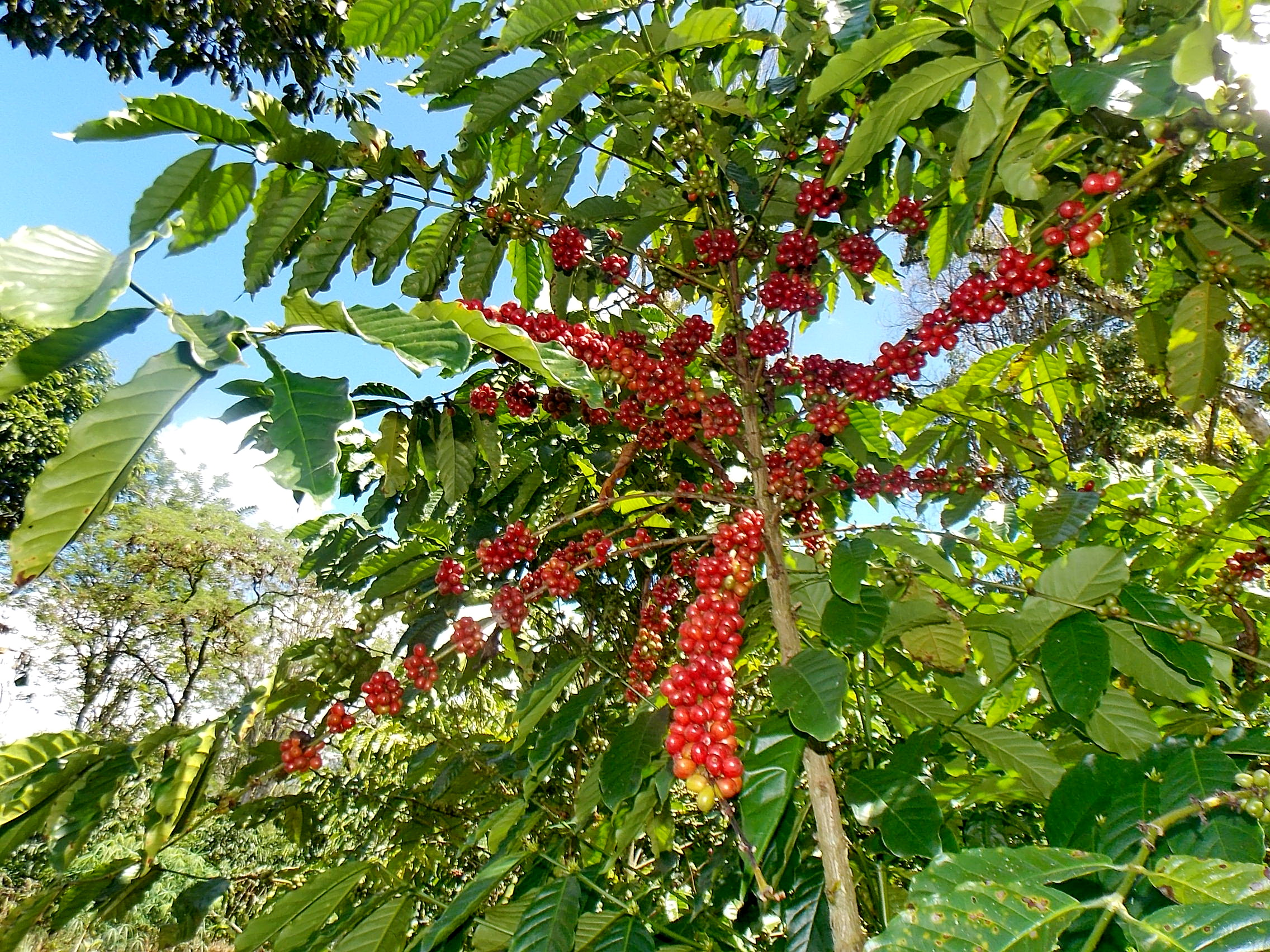
Coffee plants in Pagar Alam

There are five sectors that support economic growth in South Sumatra, such as the processing industry, mining, agriculture, construction, and large and retail trade, and the development of the Tanjung Api-Api Special Economic Zones (KEK), South Sumatra's economic growth is also supported by tourism.

The coal deposits of South Sumatra amount to 22.24 billion tons or 48.45 percent of the total national reserves. The province also has 4.18 trillion standard cubic feet of natural gas and 757.4 standard cubic feet of natural oil.

However, the agricultural sector is still the cornerstone of employment in South Sumatra compared to other sectors with absorption reaching 1.9 million people. This figure is in accordance with the potential of the area which has an area of around 774 thousand hectares of agriculture. The potential of agricultural resources in South Sumatra is quite prominent with annual production of rice reaching 4.2 million tons, corn production reaching 289 thousand tons, soybeans production reaching 16 thousand tons, palm oil production reaching 2.718 million tons, coffee (dry beans) production reaching 135.2 thousand tons, coconut production reaching 65 thousand tons. In addition to the agricultural sector, the other two sectors also absorb labor, namely the large and retail trade sector, car and motorcycle repair and the processing industry. In the trade sector there are 688,000 workers, and the processing industry reaches 279,300 people.

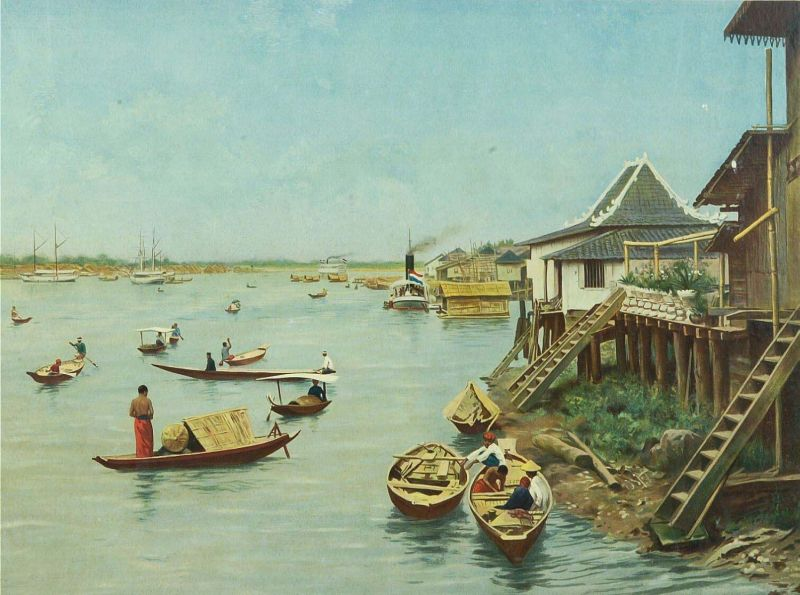
A painting depicting fishing boats on the Musi River (Indonesia)

The economy of South Sumatra in the second quarter of 2017 continued to show improvement compared to previous quarters. The realization of economic growth in South Sumatra in the second quarter of 2017 was 5.24% (YoY), higher than the first quarter of 2017 of 5.13% (YoY). From the demand side, the component of foreign exports is still the main pillar of economic growth. This was mainly supported by improvements in the prices of superior commodities in South Sumatra, namely rubber and coal. In addition, export performance was driven by improvements in the economic conditions of the main destination countries for South Sumatra's exports, including the United States, China and Europe. On the other hand, an increase in export performance has no impact on increasing household consumption. The slowdown in household consumption is estimated to be caused by the consumption pattern of people experiencing a shift. The community began to reduce tertiary needs reflected in the decline in the consumption index of durable goods. Meanwhile, in the second quarter of 2017 government consumption declined due to some government projects still in the auction stage.

== Cuisine ==
The South Sumatran cuisine or also known as the Palembang cuisine is the cuisine of the city of Palembang and the surrounding area in South Sumatra. It is the second most well-known cuisine from Sumatra after Padang. Palembang cuisine primarily uses freshwater fish and prawns as key ingredients due to the paramount role of the Musi River for the area. Popular freshwater fish includes patin (Pangasius), baung (Hemibagrus), lais (Kryptopterus cryptopterus), lele (catfish), gabus (snakehead), mas (carp) and gurame (gourami). Historically, Palembang waters were teeming with belido (giant featherback), and it has become the city's official animal mascot. It is valued for its succulent flavour and soft texture. However, due to overfishing, today the belido fish are scarce and probably already extinct in Musi river area. Because of its location that is not far from the sea, seafood such as shrimp, tenggiri (wahoo), kakap merah (red snapper) and Spanish mackerel are also popular in Palembang. Besides freshwater fish dishes, there are many variations of dishes, snacks, drinks, and sweets in Palembang cuisine.

Cuisine of South Sumatra

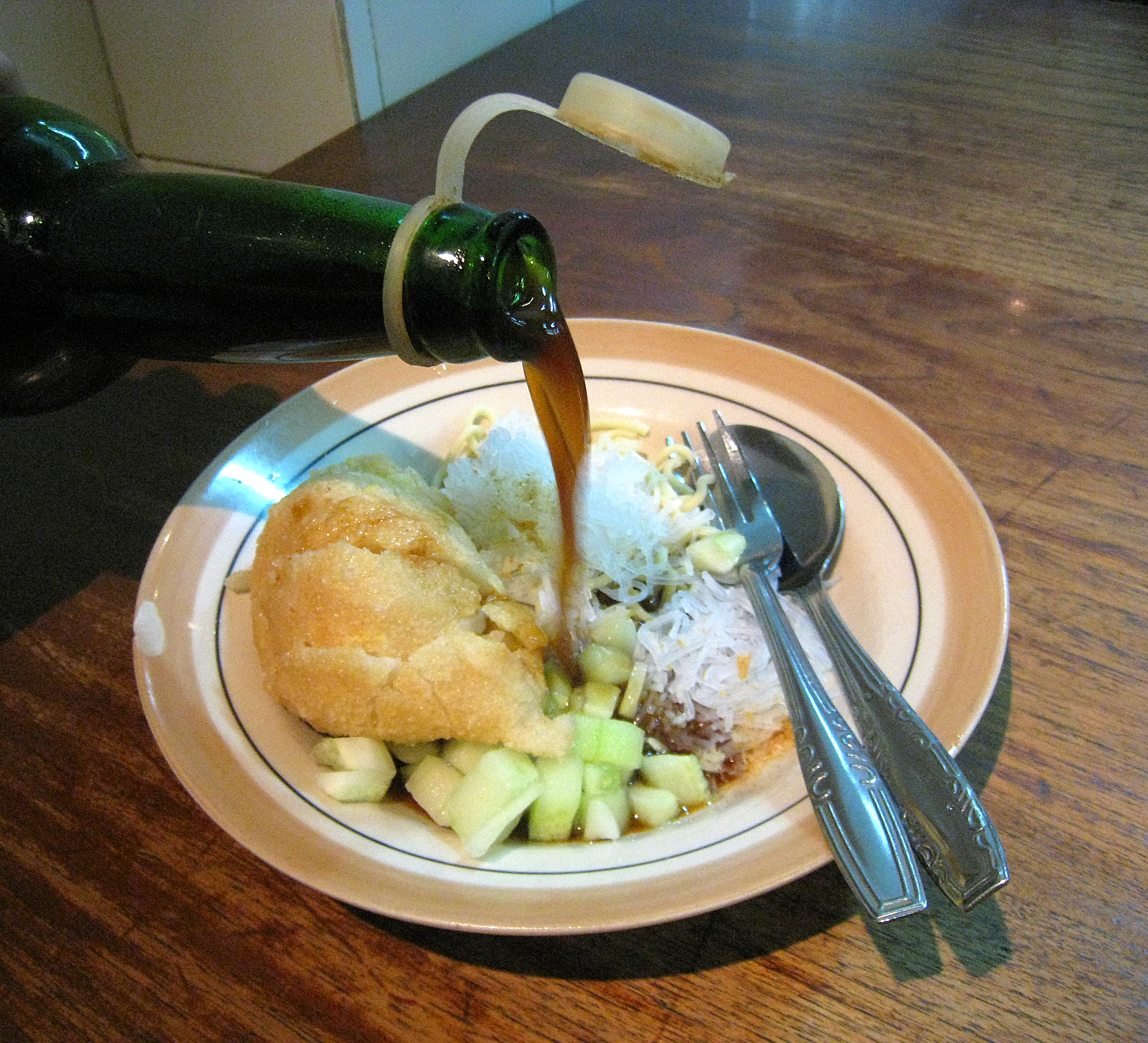
Pempek (fish cake) Kapal Selam and Kriting, simmered with Kuah Cuko

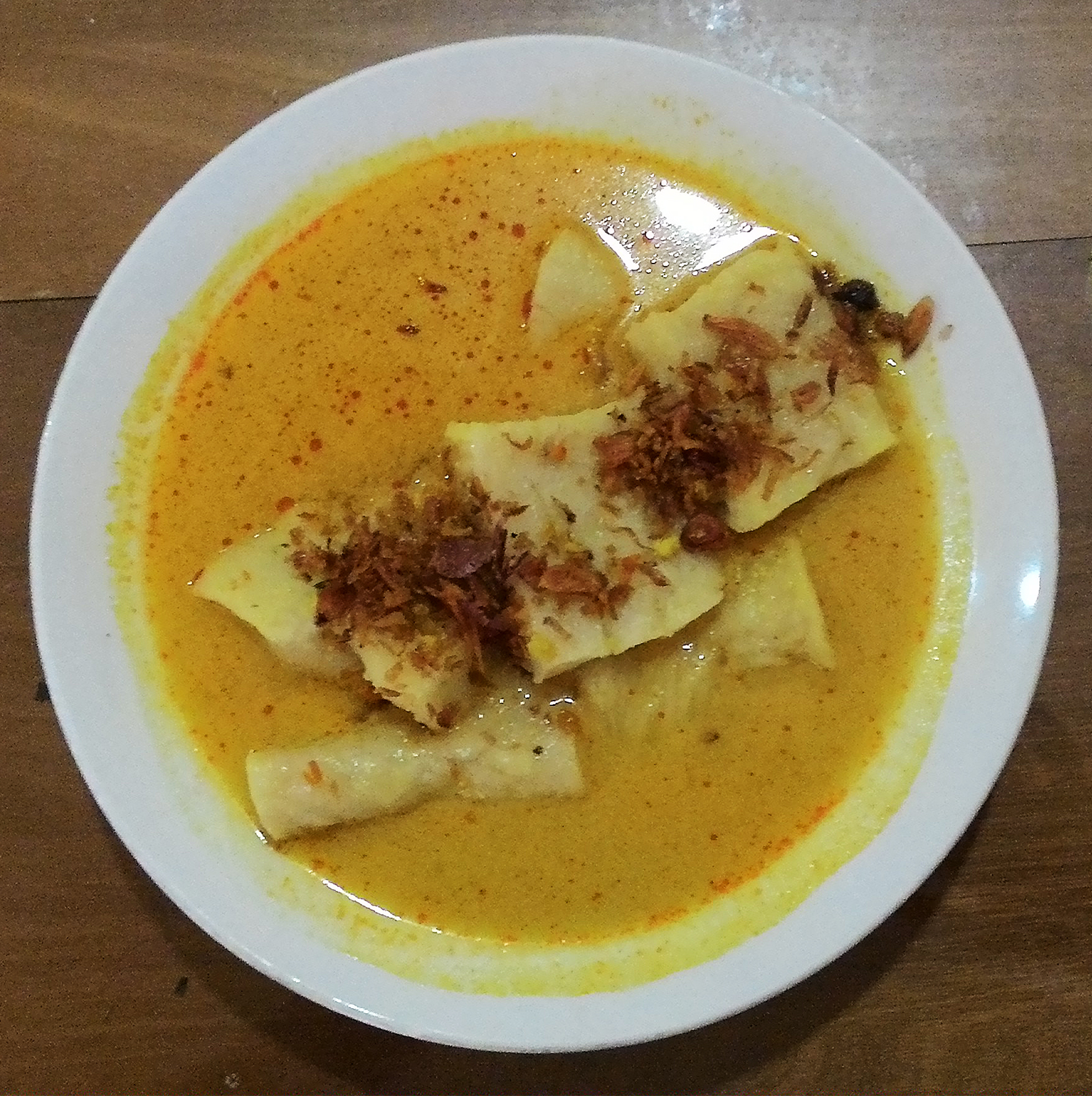
Laksan Palembang, fish cake similar to pempek served in rich coconut milk-based soup, and sprinkled with crispy fried shallot

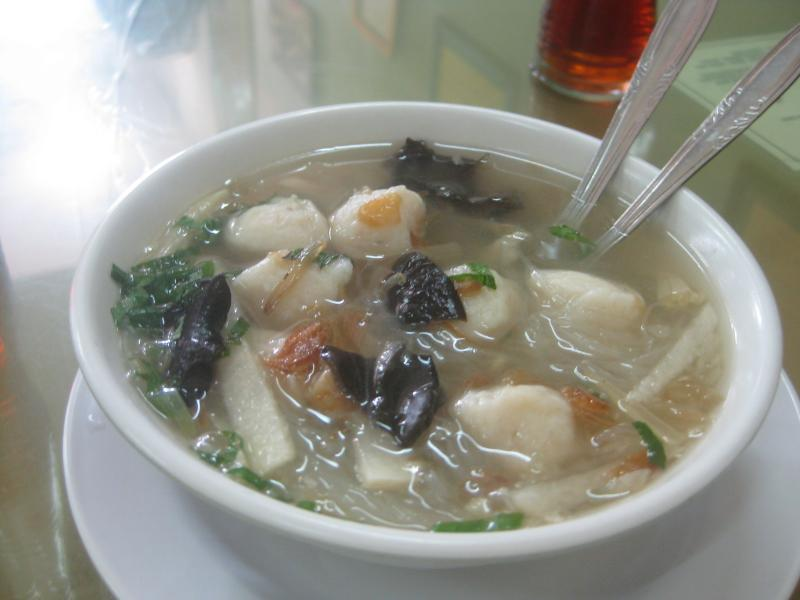
A bowl of Tekwan

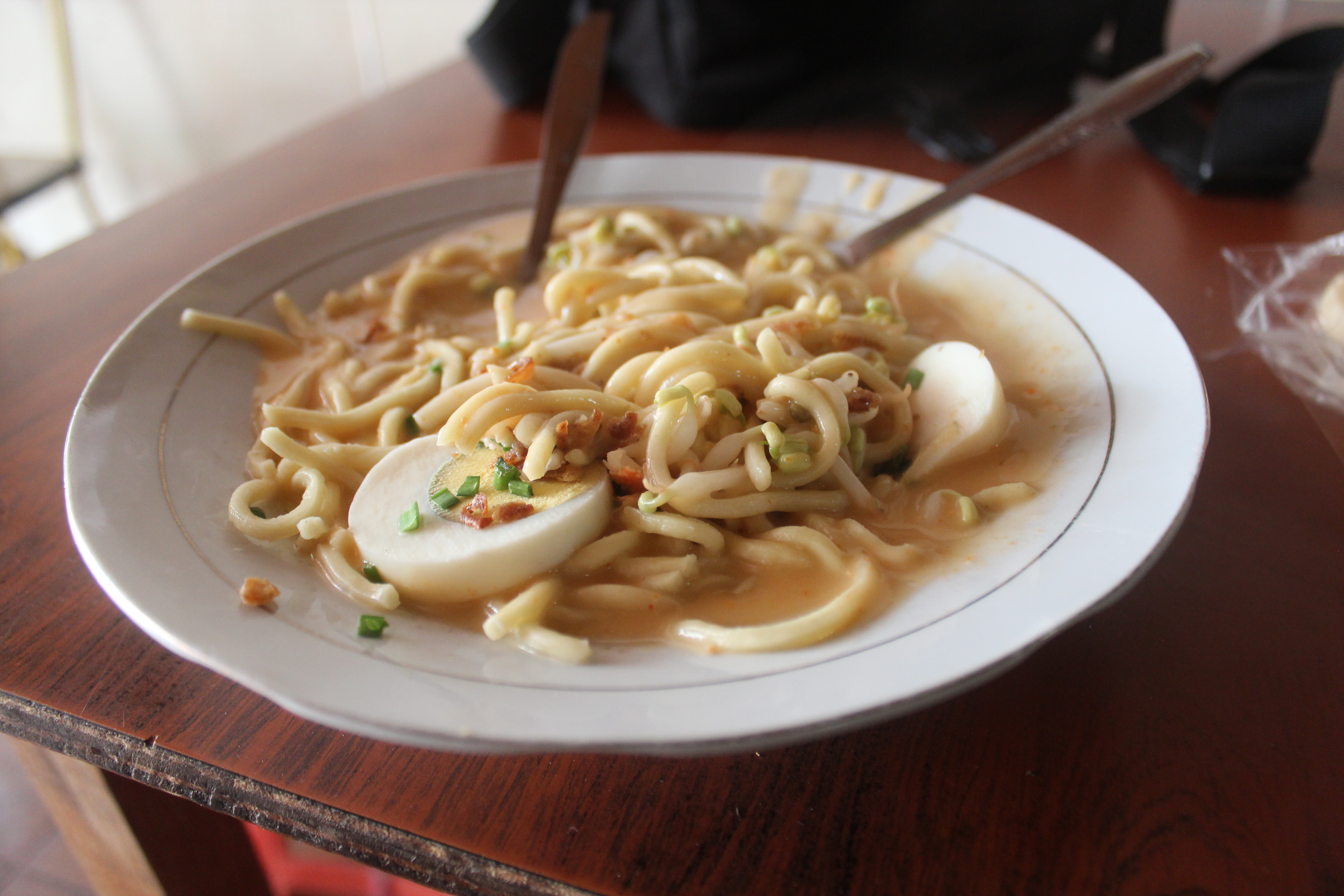
Mie celor Palembang

Spices are also generally included although not as liberally as its same-island counterpart. Palembang cuisine is noted by its preference for the sour and sweet flavour, as evidenced in pindang fish soup, strong-smelling tempoyak-based dish made from fermented durian, and also kuah cuko spicy sweet vinegar sauce of pempek fishcake. Those dishes are popular fare and often associated with the city.

Malay, Javanese, Indian, and Chinese culture has influenced Palembang's culinary scene. Pempek, tekwan and mie celor are the example of Chinese cuisine influence on Palembang. Pempek is basically fishcake made from deboned fish flesh and tapioca flour, which was a local adaptation of East Asian surimi fishcake making. Like most of noodle dishes of Indonesia, mie celor can trace its origin back to Chinese influences. It was popularly believed that Palembang preference of sweet flavour was due to Javanese influences that favoured palm sugar. Indeed, Palembang absorbs many Javanese elements, including language and cuisine. For example, both Javanese and Palembang Malay dialects refer fish as iwak, and cooking method employing banana leaf package as brengkes or brengkesan. Martabak Palembang and nasi minyak which uses ghee, on the other hand, demonstrate Indian cuisine influence in the city.

== Sports ==
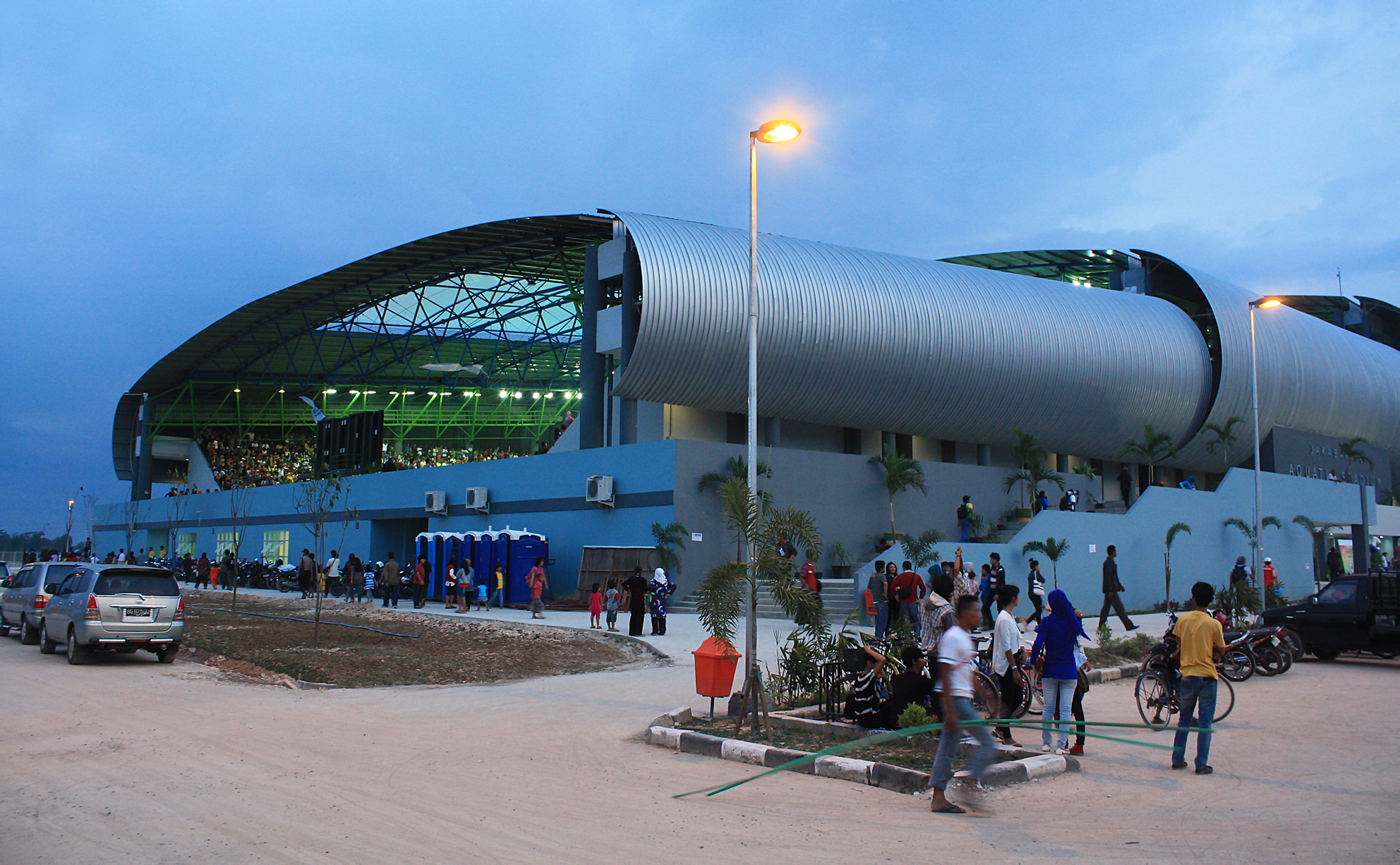
Jakabaring Aquatic Center in Jakabaring Sport City complex

South Sumatra, especially the city of Palembang is notable as the host city 2018 Asian Games along with Jakarta, the first Asian Games hold officially by two cities and the fourth host city of Asian Games in Southeast Asia after Bangkok in 1998. Palembang is also the main host of 2011 Southeast Asian Games and hosted two matches of 2007 AFC Asian Cup. Sport facilities have been built across the city since 1971 to host Pekan Olahraga Mahasiswa (POM) IX, although the city's main sport complex, Jakabaring Sport City started its construction in 1998 and expanded later in 2010. In order to keep the sport complex in frequent use, several plans have been raised by the government to encourage more sporting events into the city, including the purchase of an association football club, Persijatim Solo F.C in 2004 which then renamed to Sriwijaya F.C. Palembang also planned to build a race track inside the complex to host a MotoGP race in the city.

Football is regarded as the most popular sport in South Sumatra. Sriwijaya F.C is the only active professional football club in South Sumatra and is widely followed across the province, especially in its home city Palembang. During its home matches, the stadium often flooded with fans wearing yellow shirts on south stands, green shirts on north stands, and black shirts on east stands, representing three main ultras of the club. Badminton, basketball, volleyball and futsal also get wide attention in the city. Besides Sriwijaya F.C., notable sport teams in Palembang are BSB Hangtuah (basketball) and Palembang Bank Sumsel Babel (volleyball). Indonesian badminton players Mohammad Ahsan and Debby Susanto are also from Palembang.

== See also ==
- List of people from South Sumatra
