= List of people from South Sumatra =

This is a listing of notable people born in, or notable for their association with, South Sumatra.

== A ==
- Ambrizal, footballer who is currently playing for Persija (Palembang)
- Jules Ancion, Dutch field hockey player who competed at the 1952 Summer Olympics (Palembang)
- Putty Armein, ten-pin bowler (Palembang)

== C ==
- Choo Hoey, Singaporean musician and conductor (Palembang)

== G ==
- Great Lady of Gresik, noblewoman (Palembang)

== M ==
- A. T. Mahmud, renowned composer of 500 children's songs from Indonesia (Palembang)

== N ==
- Alex Noerdin, Governor of South Sumatra (Palembang)

== N ==
- Emil Salim, economist and former Minister of Indonesia (Lahat Regency)

== R ==
- Hatta Rajasa, Coordinating Minister for Economic Affairs (Palembang)

== S ==
- Shi Jin Qing, late 14th century chieftain (Palembang)

== Y ==
- Tantowi Yahya, presenter, country singer and entrepreneur (Palembang)
