= Palembang people =

Malay ethnic subgroup

Palembang
Orang Palembang Uwong Pelémbang ملايو ڤلامبڠ
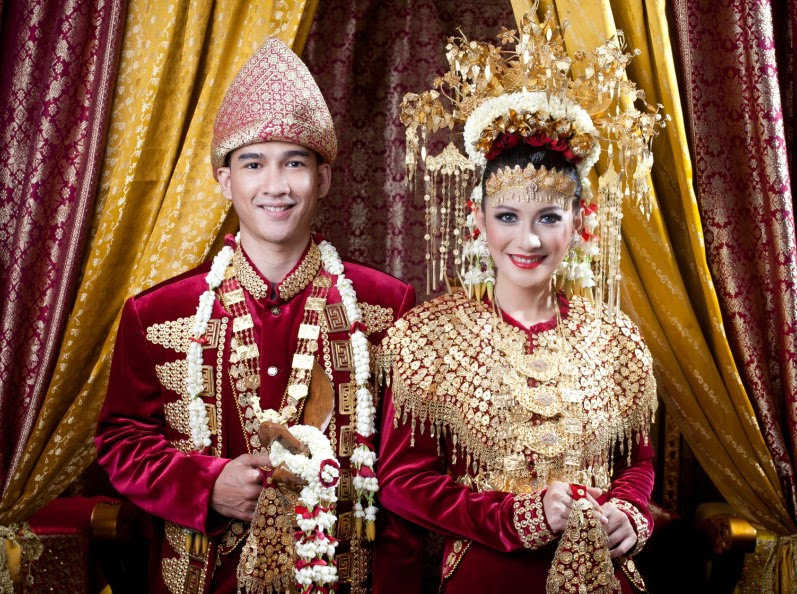

Total population
- 1.25 million in Indonesia

Regions with significant populations
- Indonesia (South Sumatra)

Languages
- Native: Palembang (locally known as Baso Palembang); Indonesian; Dialects: Palembang Ilir and Palembang Ulu; Other: Malay; Javanese (due to migration); Arabic (for religion)

Religion
- Sunni Islam

Related ethnic groups
- Austronesian peoples; Malay; Javanese; Komering; Lampung; Minangkabau; Banjar

Palembang people (Indonesian: Orang Palembang; Palembang language: Uwong Pelémbang), also called Palembang Malay (Malay: Melayu Palembang; Jawi: ملايو ڤلامبڠ) are an ethnic group native to the city of Palembang and its surrounding areas in the South Sumatra province of Indonesia. Palembang is one of the oldest cities in Southeast Asia, with a history dating back to the 7th century when it was the capital of the ancient Srivijaya Empire, a powerful Hindu-Buddhist maritime kingdom and empire that controlled much of the trade in the region.

The 2010 census recorded 1,252,258 Palembang living in Indonesia. They speak Palembang language, which is a Malay dialect with influences from Javanese and Arabic. The language has its own unique vocabulary and pronunciation, distinguishing it from other Malay dialects.

The majority of Palembang people are Muslims, with a small percentage of the population following Buddhism, Hinduism, and Christianity. The Islamic influence on Palembang culture is evident in its architecture, particularly in the city's numerous mosques and the Great Mosque of Palembang, which is one of the oldest mosques in Indonesia.

== See also ==
- Malay people
- Javanese people
- Palembang language
- Palembang cuisine
