= Palembang language =

Malayic variety spoken in southern Sumatera

Palembang
- Palembang Malay
- باسو ڤليمبڠ; Baso Pelémbang
- Native to: Indonesia
- Region: South Sumatra
- Ethnicity: Palembang Malay
- Native speakers: (1.6 million cited 2000 census)
- Language family: Austronesian: Malayo-Polynesian; (disputed); Malayic; Musi; Palembang–Lowland; Palembang
- Dialects: Palembang Lama; Palembang Pasar; Pesisir

Language codes
- ISO 639-3: (covered by mui)
- Glottolog: pale1264
- Linguasphere: 33-AFA-dh
- The distribution of Musi lects across southern Sumatra

Palembang, also known as Palembang Malay (Baso Pelémbang), is a Malayic variety of the Musi dialect chain primarily spoken in the city of Palembang and nearby lowlands, and also as a lingua franca throughout South Sumatra. Since parts of the region used to be under direct Javanese rule for quite a long time, Palembang is significantly influenced by Javanese, down to its core vocabularies.

While the name Palembang in the broad sense can also refer to the Musi dialect group as a whole, it is most commonly used as an endonym for the speech used in the city and its immediate rural vicinity.

In 2008, all the ISO 639-3 codes for Musi dialects, including [plm] for Palembang, were retired and merged into [mui] Musi. The old codes ([plm], [lmt], [pen], [rws]) are no longer in active use, but still have the meaning assigned to them when they were established in the Standard.

== Classification ==
Based on lexicostatistical analyses, mappings of sound changes, and mutual intelligibility tests, McDowell & Anderbeck (2020) classify Malayic varieties in southern Sumatra into two dialect groups, namely 1) South Barisan Malay (also called Central Malay or Middle Malay) and 2) Musi. Palembang is part of the Musi grouping, specifically the Palembang–Lowland cluster, which also includes the Lowland subcluster containing Belide, Lematang Ilir, and Penesak varieties.

Internally, the Palembang subcluster can be divided into three dialects, namely 1) Palembang Lama ("Old" Palembang), 2) Palembang Pasar ("Bazaar" Palembang) and 3) Pesisir ("Coastal"). Palembang Lama refers to the traditional variety spoken natively by ethnic Palembang communities, both within the city and the "relic areas" around it. Meanwhile, Palembang Pasar is a koiné that has become a lingua franca to bridge interethnic communication in Palembang and other major population centers throughout the region. This variety is often used polyglossically with Indonesian (resulting in the so-called "Palembang Indonesian" variety) and other regional languages/dialects in the area, both Malayic and non-Malayic.

In terms of lexicon, Palembang Lama retains many Javanese loanwords that are no longer used by speakers of Palembang Pasar. This decreasing number of Javanese loanwords used by Pasar speakers is linked to the rise of Standard Indonesian influence in the daily speech of urban areas. In terms of phonology, Pasar speakers also tend to realize Proto-Malayic *r as an apical trill [r] as in Standard Indonesian, instead of using voiced/voiceless velar fricative [ɣ~x] as is common among traditional speakers of Palembang Lama. Lastly, only traditional speakers consistently maintain a distinction between schwa and /a/ in final closed syllables.

To the north and east of Palembang, towards the border with Jambi Province and the waters of Bangka Strait, there exists the Pesisir or coastal variety, which is structurally very similar to the urban Palembang dialects. That said, Pesisir speech in the outer areas share high lexical similarity rates with neighboring Malayic lects of Jambi and Bangka. In addition, coastal speakers are not as tied to the Palembang ethnic identity as the speakers in the urban Palembang area and its immediate vicinity.

== History ==
As with other Malayic varieties, the Palembang language is a descendant of Proto-Malayic, which is believed to have originated from western Kalimantan. According to Adelaar (2004), the development of Malay as a distinct ethnic group may have been influenced by contact with Indian culture following the migration of Proto-Malayic speakers to southern Sumatra. The Sriwijaya Kingdom, centered in Palembang in the 7th century, was one of the earliest, if not the first, manifestations of the Malay nation-state. The Kedukan Bukit inscription found in Palembang is the earliest written evidence of the Malayic language family spoken in the region. However, linguists still debate whether the language variety used in the inscription is a direct ancestor of modern Malay languages (including Palembang).

Aside from ancient inscriptions, there are very few other written sources that can serve as references for the development of the Palembang language. One such written source is the Kitab Undang-Undang Simbur Cahaya, which is believed to have been compiled by Queen Sinuhun, the wife of Palembang ruler Prince Sido ing Kenayan, around the 17th century. This text was written in Classical Malay with some influence from the Javanese language, considering the Palembang royal family originated from Java. The Javanese influence in Palembang began at least as early as the 14th century. William Marsden noted two distinct language varieties used in Palembang in the 18th century. The language of the palace was a refined Javanese dialect and Malay mixed with foreign vocabulary, while the everyday language of the Palembang people was a Malay dialect, characterized primarily by the pronunciation of the vowel 'a' being changed to 'o'.

Today the use of the Palembang language is officially recognized by the government of South Sumatra as one of the indigenous language varieties in South Sumatra that must be preserved. As part of efforts to promote and preserve the Palembang language, the government of South Sumatra, supported by the Indonesian Ministry of Religious Affairs, launched the Quran (the holy book of Islam) with a Palembang language translation. This translation was released by the Research and Development Center for Religious Literature and Heritage in 2019. In addition, The refined register of the Palembang language, known as jegho/jero (or alus), has also been included as a local content subject (curriculum activity) for elementary and secondary schools in the Palembang area since 2021.

== Phonology ==
A Palembang speaker using the Pasar dialect

Dunggio (1983) lists 26 phonemes for the Palembang dialect; specifically, there are 20 consonants and 6 vowels. However, another study by Aliana (1987) states that there are only 25 phonemes in Palembang, reanalyzing /z/ as an allophone of /s/ and /d͡ʒ/ instead.

=== Vowels ===
	front	central	back
close	i		u
mid	e	ə	o
open-mid	(ɛ)		(ɔ)
open		a	

As mentioned above, Dunggio proposes a 6-vowel system for Palembang, with /i/ and /u/ in closed syllables being realized as [ɪ] and [ʊ], respectively. Some dictionaries of Palembang, however, also add [ɛ] and [ɔ] into the sound inventory for pronunciation guides without claiming their phonemic statuses (though one can see some minimal pairs as in [d͡ʒəɣo] 'inside' vs [d͡ʒəɣɔ] 'deterred').

=== Consonants ===
		bilabial	alveolar	postalv./ palatal	velar	glottal
nasal		m	n	ɲ	ŋ	
stop	voiceless	p	t	t͡ʃ	k	ʔ
stop	voiced	b	d	d͡ʒ	g	
fricative	voiceless		s			h
fricative	voiced		(z)		ɣ~ʀ	
approximant	semivowel	w		j		
approximant	lateral		l			

== Orthography ==
An orthography has been made by the local office of Language Development and Fostering Agency. It is closely related to the Indonesian Spelling System, using the same 26-letters Latin alphabet with the optional use of the letter é. Dictionaries and textbooks on the language, however, sometimes make use of different orthographies with diacritics, particularly to distinguish:

- between [e], [ɛ], and [ə] (all spelled ⟨e⟩ in Indonesian orthography),
- between [o] and [ɔ] (all spelled ⟨o⟩ in Indonesian orthography), as well as
- between [k] and [ʔ] (both mostly spelled ⟨k⟩ in Indonesian orthography).

The table below notes the differences between the spelling systems used across several sources, ordered diachronically:

Phones (Note: Regardless of phonemic status. Transcriptions are not always given in IPA in the sources; the values here are taken from Susilastri et al. (2021).)	Hasyim et al. (2003)	Trisman et al. (2007)	Zulkifly (2007) (Note: Only to indicate pronunciation in the entries and not used elsewhere; capitalized in the original source.)	Amin et al. (2010)	Susilastri et al. (2021)
[i] (Note: May also be in closed syllables, e.g. in [kəciʔ] 'small')	i	i	i	i	i
[ɪ] (Note: Only in closed syllables, in complementary distribution with [e].)	î	i	i	î	i
[e] (Note: Only in open syllables, in complementary distribution with [ɪ].)	î	e	i	ê	e
[ɛ]	ê	e, é (Note: Optional.)	e	é	e
[ə]	e	e	e	e	e
[u]	u	u	u	u	u
[ʊ] (Note: Only in closed syllables, in complementary distribution with [o].)	û	u	u	û	u
[o] (Note: Only in open syllables, in complementary distribution with [ʊ].)	û	o	u	ô	o
[ɔ]	o	o	o	o	o
[k]	k	k	k	k	k
[ʔ]	'	k	k	'	k

The system devised in the dictionary compiled by Hasyim et al. (2003) is the one used by textbooks for Palembang-language subject at schools as of 2024, and is also used in the Palembang translation of the Quran officially sanctioned by the Ministry of Religious Affairs.

== Registers ==
The Palembang language as used by a subset of traditional speakers has two linguistic registers: jero or alus (also often identified as bebaso) and sari-sari. The jero or alus register is used in conversations with community leaders, elders, or respected individuals, especially during Palembang traditional ceremonies. In contrast, the sari-sari register is used in everyday conversation.

== Example text ==
Palembang (Sari-Sari)	Indonesian	Malay	Minangkabau	English
Deklarasi Universal Pasal Hak Asasinyo Wong	Pernyataan Umum tentang Hak-Hak Asasi Manusia	Perisytiharan Hak Asasi Manusia Sejagat	Deklarasi Sadunia Hak-Hak Asasi Manusia	Universal Declaration of Human Rights
Pasal 1	Pasal 1	Perkara 1	Pasal 1	Article 1
Wong tu dilaherke merdeka galo, jugo samo-samo punyo martabat dengen hak galo. Wong-wong beroleh karunia akal dengen nurani, dan mestinyo besuo sikok samo laen dengen caro bedolor.	Semua orang dilahirkan merdeka dan mempunyai martabat dan hak-hak yang sama. Mereka dikaruniai akal dan hati nurani dan hendaknya bergaul satu sama lain dalam semangat persaudaraan	Semua manusia dilahirkan merdeka dan mempunyai martabat dan hak-hak yang sama. Mereka mempunyai pemikiran dan hati nurani dan hendaklah bergaul antara satu sama lain dengan semangat persaudaraan.	Sadonyo manusia dilahiakan mardeka dan punyo martabat sarato hak-hak nan samo. Mareka dikaruniai aka jo hati nurani, supayo satu samo lain bagaul sarupo urang badunsanak.	All human beings are born free and equal in dignity and rights. They are endowed with reason and conscience and should act towards one another in a spirit of brotherhood.
