= 2025–26 Liga 4 South Sulawesi =

Liga 4 South Sulawesi
- Season: 2025–26
- Dates: 28 January – 6 April 2026
- Champions: Makassar City
- Runner up: MRC Bulukumba
- National phase: Makassar City; MRC Bulukumba

The 2025–26 Liga 4 South Sulawesi will be the second season of Liga 4 South Sulawesi after the change in the structure of Indonesian football competition and serves as a qualifying round for the national phase of the 2025–26 Liga 4.

The competition is organised by the South Sulawesi Provincial PSSI Association.

== Teams ==
A total of 22 teams are competing in this season.

No	Team	Location	2024–25 season
1	Perslutim	East Luwu Regency	Runner-up
2	PS Luwu	Luwu Regency	Second round (4th in Group E
3	Perspin	Pinrang Regency	First round (3rd in Group D
4	Persibone	Bone Regency	Semi-finalist
5	Persim	Maros Regency	Second round (4th in Group F
6	Kasiwa	Makassar City	First round (4th in Group D
7	Makassar City	Makassar City	—
8	Makassar Jaya	Makassar City	Second round (3rd in Group F
9	Mangiwang	Makassar City	Champions
10	PS Bangau Putra	Makassar City	—
11	PS Bank Sulselbar	Makassar City	Semi-finalist
12	PS Rajawali Muda	Makassar City	—
13	PS Telkom	Makassar City	—
14	QDR	Makassar City	Second round (3rd in Group E
15	Sultan Jaya	Makassar City	First round (3rd in Group B

No	Team	Location	2024–25 season
16	Gowa United	Gowa Regency	First round (3rd in Group C
17	Persigowa	Gowa Regency	First round (4th in Group B
18	Gasta	Takalar Regency	—
19	Persijo	Jeneponto Regency	—
20	Gasiba	Bulukumba Regency	—
21	MRC Bulukumba	Bulukumba Regency	—
22	PS Kepulauan Selayar	Selayar Islands Regency	—

== First round ==
A total of 22 teams will be drawn into 6 groups of four or three. The first round will be played in a home tournament format of single round-robin matches. The top two teams of each group will qualify for the second round.

=== Grup A ===
Pos	Team	Pld	W	D	L	GF	GA	GD	Pts	Qualification
1	Gasta Takalar	3	3	0	0	7	0	+7	9	Qualification to the second round
2	Persibone Bone	3	2	0	1	7	5	+2	6	Qualification to the second round
3	Gowa United	3	1	0	2	7	5	+2	3	
4	Makassar Jaya	3	0	0	3	0	11	−11	0	

Rules for classification: 1) Points; 2) Head-to-head points; 3) Head-to-head goal difference; 4) Head-to-head goals scored; 5) Goal difference; 6) Goals scored; 7) Fair-play points; 8) Draw.

=== Grup B ===
Pos	Team	Pld	W	D	L	GF	GA	GD	Pts	Qualification
1	Makassar City	3	2	1	0	21	1	+20	7	Qualification to the second round
2	Persigowa Gowa	3	2	1	0	13	2	+11	7	Qualification to the second round
3	Perspin Pinrang	3	1	0	2	4	8	−4	3	
4	Sultan Jaya	3	0	0	3	1	28	−27	0	

Rules for classification: 1) Points; 2) Head-to-head points; 3) Head-to-head goal difference; 4) Head-to-head goals scored; 5) Goal difference; 6) Goals scored; 7) Fair-play points; 8) Draw.

=== Group C ===
Pos	Team	Pld	W	D	L	GF	GA	GD	Pts	Qualification
1	PSSK Selayar	3	3	0	0	7	1	+6	9	Qualification to the second round
2	Persijo Jeneponto	3	2	0	1	14	2	+12	6	Qualification to the second round
3	PS Bank Sulselbar	3	1	0	2	6	5	+1	3	
4	PS Rajawali Muda	3	0	0	3	1	20	−19	0	

Rules for classification: 1) Points; 2) Head-to-head points; 3) Head-to-head goal difference; 4) Head-to-head goals scored; 5) Goal difference; 6) Goals scored; 7) Fair-play points; 8) Draw.

=== Group D ===
Pos	Team	Pld	W	D	L	GF	GA	GD	Pts	Qualification
1	Mangiwang	3	2	1	0	3	1	+2	7	Qualification to the second round
2	MRC Bulukumba	3	1	1	1	3	1	+2	4	Qualification to the second round
3	Gasiba Bulukumba	3	1	0	2	2	3	−1	3	
4	Perslutim East Luwu	3	1	0	2	3	6	−3	3	

Rules for classification: 1) Points; 2) Head-to-head points; 3) Head-to-head goal difference; 4) Head-to-head goals scored; 5) Goal difference; 6) Goals scored; 7) Fair-play points; 8) Draw.

=== Group E ===
Pos	Team	Pld	W	D	L	GF	GA	GD	Pts	Qualification
1	PS Telkom Makassar	1	0	1	0	0	0	0	1	Qualification to the second round
2	Kasiwa	1	0	1	0	0	0	0	1	Qualification to the second round
3	Persim Maros	0	0	0	0	0	0	0	0	Withdrew

Rules for classification: 1) Points; 2) Head-to-head points; 3) Head-to-head goal difference; 4) Head-to-head goals scored; 5) Goal difference; 6) Goals scored; 7) Fair-play points; 8) Draw.

=== Group F ===
Pos	Team	Pld	W	D	L	GF	GA	GD	Pts	Qualification
1	Gasma Enrekang	2	2	0	0	5	1	+4	6	Qualification to the second round
2	QDR	2	1	0	1	4	1	+3	3	Qualification to the second round
3	PS Bangau Putra	2	0	0	2	1	8	−7	0	

Rules for classification: 1) Points; 2) Head-to-head points; 3) Head-to-head goal difference; 4) Head-to-head goals scored; 5) Goal difference; 6) Goals scored; 7) Fair-play points; 8) Draw.

== Second round ==
A total of 12 teams will be drawn into 4 groups. The second round will be played in a home tournament format of single round-robin matches. The top two teams of each group will qualify for the knockout round.

=== Grup G ===
Pos	Team	Pld	W	D	L	GF	GA	GD	Pts	Qualification
1	PSSK Selayar	2	0	2	0	1	1	0	2	Qualification to the knockout stage
2	Persigowa Gowa	2	0	2	0	1	1	0	2	Qualification to the knockout stage
3	Gasta Takalar	2	0	2	0	0	0	0	2	

Rules for classification: 1) Points; 2) Head-to-head points; 3) Head-to-head goal difference; 4) Head-to-head goals scored; 5) Goal difference; 6) Goals scored; 7) Fair-play points; 8) Draw.

=== Grup H ===
Pos	Team	Pld	W	D	L	GF	GA	GD	Pts	Qualification
1	Gasma Enrekang	2	2	0	0	7	1	+6	6	Qualification to the knockout stage
2	Mangiwang	2	1	0	1	7	2	+5	3	Qualification to the knockout stage
3	Kasiwa	2	0	0	2	0	11	−11	0	

Rules for classification: 1) Points; 2) Head-to-head points; 3) Head-to-head goal difference; 4) Head-to-head goals scored; 5) Goal difference; 6) Goals scored; 7) Fair-play points; 8) Draw.

=== Grup I ===
Pos	Team	Pld	W	D	L	GF	GA	GD	Pts	Qualification
1	Makassar City	2	1	1	0	21	0	+21	4	Qualification to the knockout stage
2	Persijo Jeneponto	2	1	1	0	3	0	+3	4	Qualification to the knockout stage
3	Persibone Bone	2	0	0	2	0	24	−24	0	

Rules for classification: 1) Points; 2) Head-to-head points; 3) Head-to-head goal difference; 4) Head-to-head goals scored; 5) Goal difference; 6) Goals scored; 7) Fair-play points; 8) Draw.

=== Grup J ===
Pos	Team	Pld	W	D	L	GF	GA	GD	Pts	Qualification
1	MRC Bulukumba	2	1	1	0	11	0	+11	4	Qualification to the knockout stage
2	QDR	2	1	1	0	3	0	+3	4	Qualification to the knockout stage
3	PS Telkom Makassar	2	0	0	2	0	14	−14	0	

Rules for classification: 1) Points; 2) Head-to-head points; 3) Head-to-head goal difference; 4) Head-to-head goals scored; 5) Goal difference; 6) Goals scored; 7) Fair-play points; 8) Draw.

== Knockout stage ==
The knockout stage will be played as a single match. If tied after regulation time, extra time and, if necessary, a penalty shoot-out will be used to decide the winning team. The top three teams will qualify to the national phase.

Quarter-finals
PSSK Selayar	0
Mangiwang	1
Makassar City	5
QDR	0
Gasma Enrekang	4
Persigowa Gowa	1
MRC Bulukumba	2
Persijo Jeneponto	0

Semi-finals
Mangiwang	0
Makassar City	1
Gasma Enrekang	0 (3)
MRC Bulukumba	0 (4)

Final
Makassar City	1
MRC Bulukumba	0
Third place play-off
Mangiwang	2
Gasma Enrekang	1

== See also ==
- 2025–26 Liga 4
