= 2022 Liga 3 South Sulawesi =

Tournament details
- Country: Indonesia
- Dates: 6 October 2022 – 11 December 2022
- Teams: 17

Final positions
- Champions: Persibone
- Runners-up: Makassar City
- Qualified for: 2022 Liga 3 National Round

The 2022 Liga 3 South Sulawesi is the fifth edition of Liga 3 South Sulawesi organized by Asprov PSSI South Sulawesi.

Followed by 17 clubs. The winner of this competition will immediately advance to the national round.

Gasma Enrekang is the defending champion after winning it in the 2021 season.

== Teams ==
No	Team	Location
01	Persiban	Bantaeng Regency
02	Persibone	Bone Regency
03	MRC Bulukumba	Bulukumba Regency
04	Gasiba	Bulukumba Regency
05	Persigowa	Gowa Regency
06	Perslutim	East Luwu Regency
07	Persim	Maros Regency
08	Persipangkep	Pangkajene and Islands Regency
09	Masolo United	Pinrang Regency
10	Perssin	Sinjai Regency
11	Gasta	Takalar Regency
12	Putra Mario	Soppeng Regency
13	Bank Sulselbar	Makassar
14	Makassar City	Makassar
15	Rajawali Muda	Makassar
16	Sultan Jaya	Makassar
17	QDR Makassar	Makassar

== Venues ==
- Persesos Sorowako Stadium, East Luwu Regency
- La Patau Stadium, Bone Regency
- Andi Mappe Stadium, Pangkajene and Islands Regency
- Hikmat Takalala Ground, Soppeng Regency

== First round ==
=== Group A ===
Pos	Team	Pld	W	D	L	GF	GA	GD	Pts	Qualification	LTM	MRS	SSB	MUN
1	Perslutim (H)	3	3	0	0	10	1	+9	9	Advance to Knockout round	—	2–0	3–1	5–0
2	Persim	3	1	1	1	6	3	+3	4	Advance to Knockout round		—	1–1	5–0
3	Bank Sulselbar	3	1	1	1	5	4	+1	4				—	3–0
4	Masolo United	3	0	0	3	0	13	−13	0					—

Updated to match(es) played on unknown. Source: 2022 Liga 3 South Sulawesi
(H) Hosts

=== Group B ===
Pos	Team	Pld	W	D	L	GF	GA	GD	Pts	Qualification	BON	SIN	GSB	MCI
1	Persibone (H)	0	0	0	0	0	0	0	0	Advance to Knockout round	—			
2	Perssin	0	0	0	0	0	0	0	0	Advance to Knockout round		—		
3	Gasiba	0	0	0	0	0	0	0	0				—	
4	Makassar City	0	0	0	0	0	0	0	0					—

Updated to match(es) played on unknown. Source: 2022 Liga 3 South Sulawesi
(H) Hosts

=== Group C ===
Pos	Team	Pld	W	D	L	GF	GA	GD	Pts	Qualification	PKP	BTG	GOW	SJA	RJM
1	Persipangkep (H)	0	0	0	0	0	0	0	0	Advance to Knockout round	—				
2	Persiban	0	0	0	0	0	0	0	0	Advance to Knockout round		—			
3	Persigowa	0	0	0	0	0	0	0	0				—		
4	Sultan Jaya	0	0	0	0	0	0	0	0					—	
5	Rajawali Muda	0	0	0	0	0	0	0	0						—

Updated to match(es) played on unknown. Source: 2022 Liga 3 South Sulawesi
(H) Hosts

=== Group D ===
Pos	Team	Pld	W	D	L	GF	GA	GD	Pts	Qualification	PMR	MRC	GST	QDR
1	Putra Mario (H)	0	0	0	0	0	0	0	0	Advance to Knockout round	—			
2	MRC Bulukumba	0	0	0	0	0	0	0	0	Advance to Knockout round		—		
3	Gasta	0	0	0	0	0	0	0	0				—	
4	QDR Makassar	0	0	0	0	0	0	0	0					—

Updated to match(es) played on unknown. Source: 2022 Liga 3 South Sulawesi
(H) Hosts

== Knockout round ==
Wait for the completion of the group stage first.
