= 2023–24 Liga 3 South Sulawesi =

Tournament details
- Country: Indonesia
- Venue: 2
- Dates: 16 January 2024 – 2 March 2024
- Teams: 18

Final positions
- Champions: Mangiwang (1st title)
- Runners-up: Persim
- Third place: QDR Makassar
- Fourth place: Perssin
- Qualified for: 2023–24 Liga 3 National phase

Tournament statistics
- Matches played: 38
- Goals scored: 93 (2.45 per match)
- All statistics correct as of 2 March 2024.

The 2023–24 Liga 3 South Sulawesi is the sixth edition of Liga 3 South Sulawesi organized by Asprov PSSI South Sulawesi.

This competition was attended by 24 clubs. The winner of this competition will advance to the national phase.

Persibone is the defending champion after winning it in the 2022 season.

== Teams ==
2023 Liga 3 South Sulawesi was attended by 20 teams. However, after the competition started, without having played a single match, Gasiba Bulukumba and MRC Bulukumba resigned.

No.	Team	Location
1	Persiban	Bantaeng Regency
2	Gasbar	Barru Regency
3	Persibone	Bone Regency
4	Gasiba^{WD}	Bulukumba Regency
5	MRC Bulukumba^{WD}	Bulukumba Regency
6	Persigowa	Gowa Regency
7	Persijo	Jeneponto Regency
8	Bank Sulselbar	Makassar City
9	Kasiwa	Makassar City
10	Makassar City	Makassar City
11	Mangiwang	Makassar City
12	Bangau Putra	Makassar City
13	QDR Makassar	Makassar City
14	Rajawali Muda	Makassar City
15	Sultan Jaya	Makassar City
16	Persim	Maros Regency
17	Luwu Raya United	Palopo City
18	Masolo United	Pinrang Regency
19	Perspin	Pinrang Regency
20	Perssin	Sinjai Regency

== Venues ==
- Yonzipur 8/SMG Field, Maros
- Kostrad Kariango Field, Maros

== First round ==
=== Group A ===
All matches will be held at Kostrad Kariango Field, Maros.

Pos	Team	Pld	W	D	L	GF	GA	GD	Pts	Qualification	MFC	BNK	KFC	BAN
1	Mangiwang	3	3	0	0	5	0	+5	9	Advance to the Second Round	—	1–0		2–0
2	Bank Sulselbar	3	2	0	1	8	1	+7	6	Advance to the Second Round		—	3–0	5–0
3	Kasiwa (Note: The Kasiwa vs Persiban match was originally scheduled for 15 January 2024, but was postponed due to bad weather and eventually cancelled.)	2	0	0	2	0	5	−5	0		0–2		—	
4	Persiban	2	0	0	2	0	7	−7	0					—

Source: Asprov PSSI South Sulawesi

=== Group B ===
All matches will be held at Kostrad Kariango Field, Maros.

Pos	Team	Pld	W	D	L	GF	GA	GD	Pts	Qualification	MAS	BAR	SJY	RFC
1	Masolo United	3	2	0	1	7	6	+1	6 (Note: Head-to-head result: Masolo United 3−2 Gasbar.)	Advance to the Second Round	—	3–2	3–1	
2	Gasbar	3	2	0	1	6	5	+1	6	Advance to the Second Round		—	2–1	
3	Sultan Jaya	3	1	0	2	4	5	−1	3 (Note: Head-to-head result: Sultan Jaya 2−0 Rajawali Muda.)				—	2–0
4	Rajawali Muda	3	1	0	2	4	5	−1	3		3–1	1–2		—

Source: Asprov PSSI South Sulawesi

=== Group C ===
All matches will be held at Kostrad Kariango Field, Maros.

Pos	Team	Pld	W	D	L	GF	GA	GD	Pts	Qualification	SIM	QDR	GWA
1	Persim	2	1	1	0	1	0	+1	4	Advance to the Second Round	—	0–0	
2	QDR Makassar	2	0	2	0	0	0	0	2	Advance to the Second Round		—	0–0
3	Persigowa	2	0	1	1	0	1	−1	1		0–1		—

Source: Asprov PSSI South Sulawesi

=== Group D ===
All matches will be held at Bau Massepe Stadium, Pinrang.

Pos	Team	Pld	W	D	L	GF	GA	GD	Pts	Qualification	LRU	BON	PIN
1	Luwu Raya United	2	1	1	0	2	0	+2	4	Advance to the Second Round	—		0–0
2	Persibone	2	1	0	1	3	2	+1	3	Advance to the Second Round	0–2	—	
3	Perspin	2	0	1	1	0	3	−3	1			0–3	—

Source: Asprov PSSI South Sulawesi

=== Group E ===
All matches will be held at Kostrad Kariango Field, Maros.

Pos	Team	Pld	W	D	L	GF	GA	GD	Pts	Qualification	MCI	PJO	GBA
1	Makassar City	1	0	1	0	1	1	0	1	Advance to the Second Round	—	1–1	
2	Persijo	1	0	1	0	1	1	0	1	Advance to the Second Round		—	
3	Gasiba	0	0	0	0	0	0	0	0	Withdrew			—

Source: Asprov PSSI South Sulawesi

=== Group F ===
All matches will be held at Kostrad Kariango Field, Maros.

Pos	Team	Pld	W	D	L	GF	GA	GD	Pts	Qualification	SIN	BPT	MRC
1	Perssin	1	0	1	0	0	0	0	1	Advance to the Second Round	—	0–0	
2	PS Bangau Putra	1	0	1	0	0	0	0	1	Advance to the Second Round		—	
3	MRC Bulukumba	0	0	0	0	0	0	0	0	Withdrew			—

Source: Asprov PSSI South Sulawesi

== Second round ==
=== Grup G ===
All matches will be held at Kostrad Kariango Field, Maros.

Pos	Team	Pld	W	D	L	GF	GA	GD	Pts	Qualification
1	Mangiwang	2	1	1	0	7	1	+6	4	Advance to the Knockout Round
2	QDR Makassar	2	1	1	0	5	1	+4	4	Advance to the Knockout Round
3	Gasbar	2	0	0	2	0	10	−10	0	

Source: Asprov PSSI South Sulawesi
28 January 2024
14.00 WITA

Mangiwang	6–0	Gasbar
	Report

Kostrad Kariango Field, Maros

30 January 2024
14.00 WITA

Gasbar	0–4	QDR Makassar
	Report

Kostrad Kariango Field, Maros

1 February 2024
14.00 WITA

QDR Makassar	1–1	Mangiwang
	Report

Kostrad Kariango Field, Maros

=== Grup H ===
All matches will be held at Kostrad Kariango Field, Maros.

Pos	Team	Pld	W	D	L	GF	GA	GD	Pts	Qualification
1	Bank Sulselbar	2	2	0	0	6	0	+6	6	Advance to the Knockout Round
2	Persim	2	1	0	1	3	2	+1	3	Advance to the Knockout Round
3	Masolo United	2	0	0	2	1	8	−7	0	

Source: Asprov PSSI South Sulawesi
28 January 2024
16.00 WITA

Bank Sulselbar	5–0	Masolo United
	Report

Kostrad Kariango Field, Maros

30 January 2024
16.00 WITA

Masolo United	1–3	Persim
	Report

Kostrad Kariango Field, Maros

1 February 2024
16.00 WITA

Persim	0–1	Bank Sulselbar
	Report

Kostrad Kariango Field, Maros

=== Grup I ===
All matches will be held at Kostrad Kariango Field, Maros

Pos	Team	Pld	W	D	L	GF	GA	GD	Pts	Qualification
1	Makassar City	2	1	1	0	2	1	+1	4	Advance to the Knockout Round
2	Luwu Raya United	2	1	0	1	1	1	0	3	Advance to the Knockout Round
3	PS Bangau Putra	2	0	1	1	1	2	−1	1	

Source: Asprov PSSI South Sulawesi
29 January 2024
14.00 WITA

Luwu Raya United	0–1	Makassar City
	Report

Kostrad Kariango Field, Maros

31 January 2024
14.00 WITA

Makassar City	1–1	PS Bangau Putra
	Report

Kostrad Kariango Field, Maros

2 February 2024
14.00 WITA

PS Bangau Putra	0–1	Luwu Raya United
	Report

Kostrad Kariango Field, Maros

=== Grup J ===
All matches will be held at Kostrad Kariango Field, Maros.

Pos	Team	Pld	W	D	L	GF	GA	GD	Pts	Qualification
1	Persibone	2	2	0	0	5	1	+4	6	Advance to the Knockout Round
2	Perssin	2	1	0	1	2	2	0	3	Advance to the Knockout Round
3	Persijo	2	0	0	2	0	4	−4	0	

Source: Asprov PSSI South Sulawesi
29 January 2024
16.00 WITA

Persibone	3–0	Persijo
	Report

Kostrad Kariango Field, Maros

31 January 2024
16.00 WITA

Persijo	0–1	Perssin
	Report

Kostrad Kariango Field, Maros

2 February 2024
16.00 WITA

Perssin	1–2	Persibone
	Report

Kostrad Kariango Field, Maros

== Knockout round ==
=== Bracket ===
Quarter-finals
4 February 2024 – Maros
G1	Mangiwang	1
I2	Luwu Raya United	0
4 February 2024 – Maros
H1	Bank Sulselbar	0 (3)
J2	Perssin	0 (5)
5 February 2024 – Maros
I1	Makassar City	0 (2)
G2	QDR Makassar	0 (3)
5 February 2024 – Maros
J1	Persibone	2
H2	Persim	4

Semi-finals
7 February 2024 – Maros
Mangiwang	3
Perssin	1
7 February 2024 – Maros
QDR Makassar	0
Persim	4

Final
9 February 2024 – Maros
Mangiwang	2
Persim	1
Third place play-off
2 March 2024 – Maros
Perssin	0
QDR Makassar	4

=== Quarter-finals ===
4 February 2024
13.00 WITA

Mangiwang	1–0	Luwu Raya United
	Report

Yonzipur 8/SMG Field, Maros

4 February 2024
15.30 WITA

Bank Sulselbar	0–0 (a.e.t.)	Perssin
	Report
Penalties
	3–5

Yonzipur 8/SMG Field, Maros

5 February 2024
13.00 WITA

Makassar City	0–0 (a.e.t.)	QDR Makassar
	Report
Penalties
	2–3

Yonzipur 8/SMG Field, Maros

5 February 2024
15.30 WITA

Persibone	2–4	Persim
	Report

Yonzipur 8/SMG Field, Maros

=== Semi-finals ===
7 February 2024
13.00 WITA

Mangiwang	3–1	Perssin
	Report

Yonzipur 8/SMG Field, Maros

7 February 2024
15.30 WITA

QDR Makassar	0–4	Persim
	Report

Yonzipur 8/SMG Field, Maros

=== Third place play-off ===
2 March 2024
14.30 WITA

Perssin	0–4	QDR Makassar
	Report

Yonzipur 8/SMG Field, Maros

=== Final ===
9 February 2024
15.00 WITA

Mangiwang	2–1	Persim
	Report

Yonzipur 8/SMG Field, Maros

== Qualification to the national phase ==
Team	Method of qualification	Date of qualification	Qualified to
Mangiwang	2023–24 Liga 3 South Sulawesi champions	9 February 2024	2023–24 Liga 3 National Phase
Persim	2023–24 Liga 3 South Sulawesi runner-up	9 February 2024	2023–24 Liga 3 National Phase
QDR Makassar	2023–24 Liga 3 South Sulawesi third place	2 March 2024	2023–24 Liga 3 National Phase

== See also ==
- 2023–24 Liga 3 National phase
