= 2020 Liga 3 South Sulawesi =

Tournament details
- Dates: October-TBD 2020
- Teams: 17

The 2020 Liga 3 South Sulawesi would be the fifth editions of Liga 3 (formerly known as Liga Nusantara) as a qualifying round for the national round of 2020 Liga 3. But cancelled due to the COVID-19 pandemic in Indonesia.

Perspin Pinrang were the defending champion.

== Teams ==
There are 17 teams participated in the league this season.

Team	Location
Gasbar Barru	Barru
Gasiba Bulukumba	Bulukumba
Gasis Soppeng	Watansoppeng
Gasma Enrekang	Enrekang
Gasta Takalar	Takalar
Persiban Bantaeng	Bantaeng
Persibone Bone	Watampone
Persijo Jeneponto	Jeneponto
Persim Maros	Maros
Persipangkep Pangkep	Pangkajene
Persipare Parepare	Parepare
Perspin Pinrang	Pinrang
Perssin Sinjai	Sinjai
PS Bank Sulselbar	Makassar
PS Kepulauan Selayar	Selayar Islands
PS Nene Mallomo	Sidenreng Rappang
PS Sultan Jaya	Makassar
