= Hendra Ridwan =

Indonesian footballer

Personal information
- Full name: Hendra Ridwan
- Date of birth: 1 December 1985 (age 40)
- Place of birth: Makassar, Indonesia
- Height: 1.70 m (5 ft 7 in)
- Position: Defensive midfielder

Team information
- Current team: Mangiwang
- Number: 24

Youth career
- PSM Makassar

Senior career*
| Years | Team | Apps | (Gls) |
| 2005 | Persim Maros | | |
| 2006 | PKT Bontang | 22 | (1) |
| 2007–2008 | Persmin Minahasa | 18 | (0) |
| 2008–2009 | Arema Malang | 27 | (1) |
| 2009–2010 | Persipura Jayapura | 15 | (0) |
| 2010 | PSM Makassar | 7 | (0) |
| 2011 | Arema Indonesia | 6 | (0) |
| 2011–2012 | Persib Bandung | 10 | (0) |
| 2012–2015 | Mitra Kukar | 41 | (2) |
| 2016–2017 | Borneo | 16 | (0) |
| 2017 | 757 Kepri Jaya | 8 | (0) |
| 2018 | Persiba Balikpapan | 4 | (0) |
| 2019 | Sriwijaya | 7 | (0) |
| 2021 | RANS Cilegon | 0 | (0) |
| 2021–2022 | Alesha | 13 | (0) |
| 2024– | Mangiwang | 9 | (0) |

International career
| 2004 | Indonesia U20 | | |
| 2006–2007 | Indonesia U23 | | |
- * Club domestic league appearances and goals as of 4 February 2025

Hendra Ridwan (born 1 December 1985 in Makassar) is an Indonesian professional footballer who plays as a defensive midfielder for Liga 4 club Mangiwang.

== Honours ==
=== Club ===
Persipura Jayapura

- Indonesian Community Shield: 2009

Mitra Kukar

- General Sudirman Cup: 2015

Mangiwang

- Liga 3 South Sulawesi: 2023–24
- Liga 4 South Sulawesi: 2024–25
