= 2024–25 Liga 4 South Sulawesi =

Liga 4 South Sulawesi
- Season: 2024–25
- Dates: 20 January – 23 February 2025
- Champions: Mangiwang (1st title)
- National phase: Mangiwang; Perslutim
- Matches: 36
- Goals: 83 (2.31 per match)
- Biggest win: Perslutim 9–0 Persibone (15 February 2025)
- Highest scoring: Perslutim 9–0 Persibone (15 February 2025)

The 2024–25 Liga 4 South Sulawesi will be the inaugural season of Liga 4 South Sulawesi after the structural changes of Indonesian football competition and serves as a qualifying round for the national phase of the 2024–25 Liga 4. The competition will be organised by the South Sulawesi Provincial PSSI Association.

== Teams ==
=== Participating teams ===
A total of 16 teams are competing in this season.

No	Team	Location	2023–24 season
1	Perslutim	East Luwu Regency	—
2	PS Luwu	Luwu Regency	—
3	Perspin	Pinrang Regency	First round (3rd in Group D)
4	Persipare	Parepare City	—
5	Gasbar	Barru Regency	Second round (3rd in Group G)
6	Persibone	Bone Regency	Quarter-finalist

No	Team	Location	2023–24 season
7	Persim	Maros Regency	Runner-up
8	Bank Sulselbar	Makassar City	Quarter-finalist
9	Kasiwa	Makassar City	First round (3rd in Group A)
10	Makassar Jaya	Makassar City	—
11	Mangiwang	Makassar City	Champions
12	QDR	Makassar City	Third-place
13	PS Telkom	Makassar City	—
14	Sultan Jaya	Makassar City	First round (3rd in Group B)
15	Gowa United	Gowa Regency	—
16	Persigowa	Gowa Regency	First round (3rd in Group C)

=== Personnel and kits ===
Note: Flags indicate national team as has been defined under FIFA eligibility rules. Players and coaches may hold more than one non-FIFA nationality.

Team	Head coach	Captain	Kit manufacturer	Main kit sponsor	Other kit sponsor(s)
Perslutim			(Indonesia) NS Apparel	Luwu Timur Inspiring	List: Front: Back: Sleeves: Shorts:
PS Luwu					List: Front: Back: Sleeves: Shorts:
Perspin					List: Front: Back: Sleeves: Shorts:
Persipare		(Indonesia) Zulkarnain S.	(Indonesia) Made by club	Intan BTLD MTR	List: Front: Titik Kumpul Mini Soccer, UD Nur; Back: Sleeves: Shorts:
Gasbar					List: Front: Back: Sleeves: Shorts:
Persibone	(Indonesia) Muhammad Syamsul Rijal		(Indonesia) Marennu Sport	Care.in	List: Front: None; Back: Marennu Sport; Sleeves: None; Shorts: None
Persim					List: Front: Back: Sleeves: Shorts:
Bank Sulselbar				Bank Sulselbar Syariah	List: Front: Heri Cell; Back: Sleeves: Shorts:
Kasiwa			(Indonesia) Nevs Apparel	Kanaya	List: Front: Back: Sleeves: Shorts:
Makassar Jaya		(Indonesia) Ihfan Prasetya	(Indonesia) Venium	Gojek	List: Front: None; Back: None; Sleeves: None; Shorts: None
Mangiwang	(Indonesia) Yusrifar Djafar		(Indonesia) OnSide	PT Barakah Niaga Semen	List: Front: Sahabat Cundiank; Back: Megah Mie, Brainhouse Makassar; Sleeves: Arus Perubahan; Shorts: None
QDR			(Indonesia) RMB Apparel	QDR Group	List: Front: Back: Sleeves: Shorts:
PS Telkom					List: Front: Back: Sleeves: Shorts:
Sultan Jaya			(Indonesia) Fifteen Apparel	Bintang Galaxy Football Academy	List: Front: Back: Sleeves: Shorts:
Gowa United	(Indonesia) Haerul Abbas		(Indonesia) Garuda Sport	PT Farisa Mandiri Perkasa	List: Front: Back: Sleeves: Shorts:
Persigowa					List: Front: Back: Sleeves: Shorts:

== Schedule ==
The schedule of the competition is as follows.

Round	Matchday	Date			
First round	—N/a	Group A	Group B	Group C	Group D
First round	Matchday 1	20 January 2025	21 January 2025	29 January 2025	31 January 2025
First round	Matchday 2	22 January 2025	23 January 2025	1 February 2025	2 February 2025
First round	Matchday 3	24 January 2025	25 January 2025	3 February 2025	4 February 2025
Second round	—N/a	Group E		Group F	
Second round	Matchday 1	15 February 2025			
Second round	Matchday 2	16 February 2025			
Second round	Matchday 3	18 February 2025			
Knockout round
Knockout round	Semi-finals	20–21 February 2025			
Knockout round	Final	23 February 2025			

== First round ==
The draw for the first round took place on 14 January 2025. The 16 teams will be drawn into 4 groups of four. The first round will be played in a home tournament format of single round-robin matches.

The top two teams of each group will qualify for the second round.

=== Group A ===
All matches will be held at Yonarhanud 16 Kostrad Field, Maros.

Pos	Team	Pld	W	D	L	GF	GA	GD	Pts	Qualification	LWU	MJY	PAR	TEL
1	PS Luwu	2	1	1	0	2	1	+1	4	Qualification to the second round	—	2–1	0–0	—
2	Makassar Jaya	2	1	0	1	3	3	0	3	Qualification to the second round	—	—	—	—
3	Persipare	2	0	1	1	1	2	−1	1		—	1–2	—	—
4	PS Telkom	0	0	0	0	0	0	0	0	Disqualified	—	—	—	—

Source: Liga 4 South Sulawesi
Legend: Blue = home team win; Yellow = draw; Red = away team win.
Rules for classification: 1) Points; 2) Head-to-head points; 3) Head-to-head goal difference; 4) Head-to-head goals scored; 5) Goal difference; 6) Goals scored; 7) Fair-play points; 8) Draw.

==== Group A Matches ====
Matchday 1 (20 January)
20 January 2025
13:30 UTC+8

PS Luwu	0–0	Persipare
	Report

Yonarhanud 16 Kostrad Field, Maros
20 January 2025
16:00 UTC+8

Makassar Jaya	~~3–0~~ Cancelled	PS Telkom
	Report

Yonarhanud 16 Kostrad Field, Maros

Matchday 2 (22 January)
22 January 2025
13:30 UTC+8

Persipare	1–2	Makassar Jaya
	Report

Yonarhanud 16 Kostrad Field, Maros
22 January 2025
16:00 UTC+8

PS Telkom	~~0–3~~ Cancelled	PS Luwu
	Report

Yonarhanud 16 Kostrad Field, Maros

Matchday 3 (24 January)
24 January 2025
13:30 UTC+8

PS Luwu	2–1	Makassar Jaya
	Report

Yonarhanud 16 Kostrad Field, Maros
24 January 2025
16:00 UTC+8

Persipare	~~3–0~~ Cancelled	PS Telkom
	Report

Yonarhanud 16 Kostrad Field, Maros

=== Group B ===
All matches will be held at Yonarhanud 16 Kostrad Field, Maros.

Pos	Team	Pld	W	D	L	GF	GA	GD	Pts	Qualification	BNK	LTM	SJY	GWA
1	Bank Sulselbar	3	3	0	0	5	1	+4	9	Qualification to the second round	—	—	1–0	2–0
2	Perslutim	3	1	1	1	6	2	+4	4	Qualification to the second round	1–2	—	0–0	—
3	Sultan Jaya	3	1	1	1	2	1	+1	4		—	—	—	2–0
4	Persigowa	3	0	0	3	0	9	−9	0		—	0–5	—	—

Source: Liga 4 South Sulawesi
Legend: Blue = home team win; Yellow = draw; Red = away team win.
Rules for classification: 1) Points; 2) Head-to-head points; 3) Head-to-head goal difference; 4) Head-to-head goals scored; 5) Goal difference; 6) Goals scored; 7) Fair-play points; 8) Draw.

==== Group B Matches ====
Matchday 1 (21 January)
21 January 2025
13:30 UTC+8

Perslutim	1–2	Bank Sulselbar

Yonarhanud 16 Kostrad Field, Maros
21 January 2025
16:00 UTC+8

Sultan Jaya	2–0	Persigowa

Yonarhanud 16 Kostrad Field, Maros

Matchday 2 (23 January)
23 January 2025
13:30 UTC+8

Bank Sulselbar	1–0	Sultan Jaya

Yonarhanud 16 Kostrad Field, Maros
23 January 2025
16:00 UTC+8

Persigowa	0–5	Perslutim
	Report

Yonarhanud 16 Kostrad Field, Maros

Matchday 3 (25 January)
25 January 2025
13:30 UTC+8

Perslutim	0–0	Sultan Jaya
	Report

Yonarhanud 16 Kostrad Field, Maros
25 January 2025
16:00 UTC+8

Bank Sulselbar	2–0	Persigowa
	Report

Yonarhanud 16 Kostrad Field, Maros

=== Group C ===
All matches will be held at Yonarhanud 16 Kostrad Field, Maros.

Pos	Team	Pld	W	D	L	GF	GA	GD	Pts	Qualification	QDR	MAR	GUN	BAR
1	QDR	3	2	0	1	6	1	+5	6	Qualification to the second round	—	—	2–0	—
2	Persim	3	1	2	0	1	0	+1	5	Qualification to the second round	1–0	—	—	0–0
3	Gowa United	3	1	1	1	3	2	+1	4		—	0–0	—	—
4	Gasbar	3	0	1	2	0	7	−7	1		0–4	—	0–3	—

Source: Liga 4 South Sulawesi
Legend: Blue = home team win; Yellow = draw; Red = away team win.
Rules for classification: 1) Points; 2) Head-to-head points; 3) Head-to-head goal difference; 4) Head-to-head goals scored; 5) Goal difference; 6) Goals scored; 7) Fair-play points; 8) Draw.

==== Group C Matches ====
Matchday 1 (29 January)
29 January 2025
13:30 UTC+8

Persim	0–0	Gasbar
	Report

Yonarhanud 16 Kostrad Field, Maros
29 January 2025
16:00 UTC+8

QDR	2–0	Gowa United
	Report

Yonarhanud 16 Kostrad Field, Maros

Matchday 2 (1 February)
1 February 2025
13:30 UTC+8

Gasbar	0–4	QDR
	Report

Yonarhanud 16 Kostrad Field, Maros
1 February 2025
16:00 UTC+8

Gowa United	0–0	Persim
	Report

Yonarhanud 16 Kostrad Field, Maros

Matchday 3 (3 February)
3 February 2025
13:30 UTC+8

Persim	1–0	QDR
	Report

Yonarhanud 16 Kostrad Field, Maros
3 February 2025
16:00 UTC+8

Gasbar	0–3	Gowa United
	Report

Yonarhanud 16 Kostrad Field, Maros

=== Group D ===
All matches will be held at Yonarhanud 16 Kostrad Field, Maros.

Pos	Team	Pld	W	D	L	GF	GA	GD	Pts	Qualification	MFC	BON	PIN	KFC
1	Mangiwang	3	2	1	0	8	1	+7	7	Qualification to the second round	—	—	5–0	1–1
2	Persibone	3	2	0	1	5	3	+2	6	Qualification to the second round	0–2	—	2–0	—
3	Perspin	3	1	0	2	1	7	−6	3		—	—	—	1–0
4	Kasiwa	3	0	1	2	2	5	−3	1		—	1–3	—	—

Source: Liga 4 South Sulawesi
Legend: Blue = home team win; Yellow = draw; Red = away team win.
Rules for classification: 1) Points; 2) Head-to-head points; 3) Head-to-head goal difference; 4) Head-to-head goals scored; 5) Goal difference; 6) Goals scored; 7) Fair-play points; 8) Draw.

==== Group A Matches ====
Matchday 1 (31 January)
30 January 2025
13:30 UTC+8

Persibone	0–2	Mangiwang

Yonarhanud 16 Kostrad Field, Maros
31 January 2025
16:00 UTC+8

Perspin	1–0	Kasiwa
	Report

Yonarhanud 16 Kostrad Field, Maros

Matchday 2 (2 February)
2 February 2025
13:30 UTC+8

Mangiwang	5–0	Perspin
	Report

Yonarhanud 16 Kostrad Field, Maros
2 February 2025
16:00 UTC+8

Kasiwa	1–3	Persibone
	Report

Yonarhanud 16 Kostrad Field, Maros

Matchday 3 (4 February)
4 February 2025
13:30 UTC+8

Persibone	2–0	Perspin
	Report

Yonarhanud 16 Kostrad Field, Maros
4 February 2025
16:00 UTC+8

Mangiwang	1–1	Kasiwa
	Report

Yonarhanud 16 Kostrad Field, Maros

== Second round ==
The 8 teams that qualify from the first round will be drawn into 2 groups of four. The second round will be played in a home tournament format of single round-robin matches.

The top two teams of each group will qualify for the knockout round.

=== Group E ===
All matches will be held at Yonif Para Raider 432 Kariango Field, Maros.

Pos	Team	Pld	W	D	L	GF	GA	GD	Pts	Qualification	LTM	BON	QDR	LWU
1	Perslutim	3	3	0	0	14	0	+14	9	Qualification to the Knockout round	—	9–0	—	—
2	Persibone	3	2	0	1	3	10	−7	6	Qualification to the Knockout round	—	—	—	2–1
3	QDR	3	0	1	2	0	3	−3	1		0–2	0–1	—	—
4	PS Luwu	3	0	1	2	1	5	−4	1		0–3	—	0–0	—

Source: Liga 4 South Sulawesi
Legend: Blue = home team win; Yellow = draw; Red = away team win.
Rules for classification: 1) Points; 2) Head-to-head points; 3) Head-to-head goal difference; 4) Head-to-head goals scored; 5) Goal difference; 6) Goals scored; 7) Fair-play points; 8) Draw.

Group E Matches

Matchday 1 (15 February)
15 February 2025
08:30 UTC+8

PS Luwu	0–0	QDR
	Report

Yonif Para Raider 432 Kariango Field, Maros
15 February 2025
10:30 UTC+8

Perslutim	9–0	Persibone
	Report

Yonif Para Raider 432 Kariango Field, Maros

Matchday 2 (16 February)
16 February 2025
08:30 UTC+8

Persibone	2–1	PS Luwu
	Report

Yonif Para Raider 432 Kariango Field, Maros
16 February 2025
10:30 UTC+8

QDR	0–2	Perslutim
	Report

Yonif Para Raider 432 Kariango Field, Maros

Matchday 3 (18 February)
18 February 2025
13:30 UTC+8

PS Luwu	0–3	Perslutim
	Report

Yonif Para Raider 432 Kariango Field, Maros
18 February 2025
16:00 UTC+8

QDR	0–1	Persibone
	Report

Yonif Para Raider 432 Kariango Field, Maros

=== Group F ===
All matches will be held at Yonif Para Raider 432 Kariango Field, Maros.

Pos	Team	Pld	W	D	L	GF	GA	GD	Pts	Qualification	MFC	BNK	MJY	MAR
1	Mangiwang	3	2	1	0	5	2	+3	7	Qualification to the Knockout round	—	—	1–1	2–1
2	Bank Sulselbar	3	2	0	1	5	3	+2	6	Qualification to the Knockout round	0–2	—	2–1	—
3	Makassar Jaya	3	0	2	1	2	3	−1	2		—	—	—	0–0
4	Persim	3	0	1	2	1	5	−4	1		—	0–3	—	—

Source: Liga 4 South Sulawesi
Legend: Blue = home team win; Yellow = draw; Red = away team win.
Rules for classification: 1) Points; 2) Head-to-head points; 3) Head-to-head goal difference; 4) Head-to-head goals scored; 5) Goal difference; 6) Goals scored; 7) Fair-play points; 8) Draw.

Group F Matches

Matchday 1 (15 February)
15 February 2025
13:30 UTC+8

Makassar Jaya	0–0	Persim
	Report

Yonif Para Raider 432 Kariango Field, Maros
15 February 2025
16:00 UTC+8

Bank Sulselbar	0–2	Mangiwang
	Report

Yonif Para Raider 432 Kariango Field, Maros

Matchday 2 (16 February)
16 February 2025
13:30 UTC+8

Persim	0–3	Bank Sulselbar
	Report

Yonif Para Raider 432 Kariango Field, Maros
16 February 2025
16:00 UTC+8

Mangiwang	1–1	Makassar Jaya
	Report

Yonif Para Raider 432 Kariango Field, Maros

Matchday 3 (18 February)
18 February 2025
08:30 UTC+8

Bank Sulselbar	2–1	Makassar Jaya
	Report

Yonif Para Raider 432 Kariango Field, Maros
18 February 2025
10:30 UTC+8

Mangiwang	2–1	Persim
	Report

Yonif Para Raider 432 Kariango Field, Maros

== Knockout round ==
The knockout round will be played as a single match. If tied after regulation time, extra time and, if necessary, a penalty shoot-out will be used to decide the winning team. Finalist will qualify to the national phase.

=== Bracket ===
Semi-finals
20 February 2025 — Maros
E1	Perslutim	1
F2	Bank Sulselbar	0
21 February 2025 — Maros
F1	Mangiwang	2
E2	Persibone	1

Final
23 February 2025 — Maros
Perslutim	1
Mangiwang	2

=== Semi-finals ===
20 February 2025
08:30 UTC+8

Perslutim	1–0	Bank Sulselbar
	Report

Yonif Para Raider 432 Kariango Field, Maros

21 February 2025
08:30 UTC+8

Mangiwang	2–1	Persibone
	Report

Yonif Para Raider 432 Kariango Field, Maros

=== Final ===
23 February 2025
08:30 UTC+8

Perslutim	1–2	Mangiwang
	Report

Yonif Para Raider 432 Kariango Field, Maros

== See also ==
- 2024–25 Liga 4
