= Seng Paselleri =

Indonesian diplomat

Muhammad Seng Paselleri
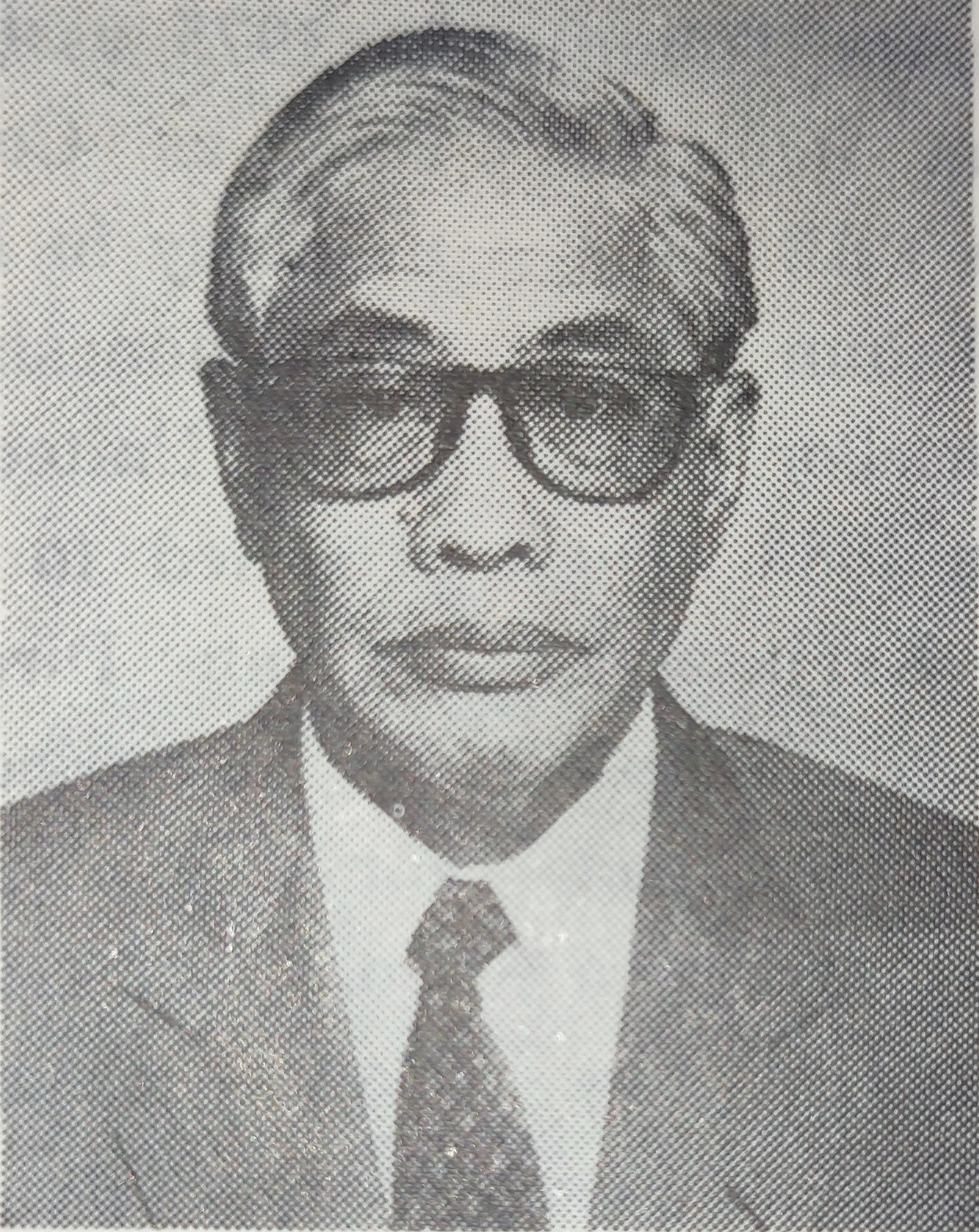

Ambassador of Indonesia to Kenya
- In office 8 April 1993 – 1997
- President: Suharto
- Preceded by: Dalindra Aman
- Succeeded by: Isslamet Poernomo

Personal details
- Born: 15 October 1935 (age 90)
- Children: 1
- Education: Gadjah Mada University (Drs.); Syracuse University

Muhamad Seng Paselleri (born 15 October 1935) is an Indonesian career diplomat who served as ambassador to Kenya from 1993 to 1997.

== Early life and education ==
Seng was born on 15 October 1935 in Pinrang. He received his undergraduate degree in international relations from the Gadjah Mada University in 1960. He also underwent education at the Syracuse University in 1962.

== Diplomatic career ==
Seng joined the diplomatic service in 1961 and completed mid-level diplomatic education in 1967. He was sent for his maiden overseas assignment at the embassy in London with the diplomatic rank of third secretary. He was promoted to second secretary shortly after. By 1972, he returned to Jakarta, and the next year he was entrusted as the chief of commodities at the directorate general of multilateral economic relations. A few months later, he was promoted within the same directorate general as chief of the 4th multilateral section within the directorate of multilateral economic relations.

From Jakarta, Seng moved to Brussels in 1975, where he was in charge of economic matters with the diplomatic rank of first secretary. He was promoted to counsellor, and by 1979 was reassigned for the same portofolio at the permanent mission in Geneva. Seng returned to the foreign department in 1981 and was appointed as the deputy director for United Nations and non-United Nations regional socio-economic agencies (Kasubdit Badan Regional Ekonomi Sosial PBB dan Non PBB) within the directorate of multilateral economic relations.

Seng attended a regular course at the National Resilience Institute in 1983 before being sent abroad to the embassy in the United States on the same year. In the embassy, Seng was entrusted as chief of economics with the rank of minister counsellor. He served in the embassy for five years, and was sent home in 1988 for a promotion as director for investment and financial cooperation.

Seng's post was shifted to the director of economic relations with developing countries in 1990. He assumed the post for a year until his replacement by Rachadi on 12 October 1991. He was then sent as the deputy head of mission to the European Community in the same year, with his accreditation being received on 13 November that year.

On 8 April 1993, Seng became Indonesia's ambassador in Kenya, with concurrent accreditation to Seychelles, Uganda, the United Nations Environment Programme, and the UN Centre for Human Settlements. He presented his credentials to Elizabeth Dowdeswell as the UN's top official in Nairobi on 8 July and to the president of Seychelles France-Albert René on 25 September 1993. As ambassador, Seng facilitated trade missions from Indonesia to improve bilateral trade relations with Kenya. Seng accused "the West" of broadcasting negative news on Kenya to restrict Indonesian entry into the Kenyan market. His term ended in 1997.

== Personal life ==
Seng is married and has a children. Seng is a Muslim.
