= Begonia ozotothrix =

Scientific classification
- Kingdom: Plantae
- Clade: Tracheophytes
- Clade: Angiosperms
- Clade: Eudicots
- Clade: Rosids
- Order: Cucurbitales
- Family: Begoniaceae
- Genus: Begonia
- Species: B. ozotothrix

Binomial name
- Begonia ozotothrix D.C.Thomas

Species of flowering plant

Begonia ozotothrix is a species of flowering plant in the family Begoniaceae, endemic to southern Sulawesi. It is an epiphyte with a shrub-like habit, that grows on moist limestone near riverbanks. The specific epithet comes from the Greek words ozotus (meaning branched) and thrix (meaning hair). B. ozotothrix has pink flowers, and dark green leaves covered in hairs. The foliage is generally dark green, but at least in Bone Regency populations, sometimes silvery veins, deeper colored leave, variegation, or serrated, hairy edges were present.The limestone cliffs that are the habitat for this species are at risk of being cleared for corn plantations.
