= Masolo United F.C. =

Indonesian football club

- Full name: Masolo United Football Club
- Nicknames: Bebek Emas (Golden Ducks); Laskar Tau Sawitto (Tau Sawitto Warriors)
- Short name: MUFC
- Founded: 2020; 6 years ago
- Ground: Teppo Patampanua Field; Pinrang, South Sulawesi
- Capacity: 3,000
- Owner: PT Pacculena Masolo Ma'golo
- Chairman: A. Raditya Rajendra Arsyad
- Manager: Sulaeman Paturusi
- Coach: Syamsir Farid
- League: Liga 4
- 2023: 3rd in Second Round of Group G, (South Sulawesi zone)
Home colours	Away colours

Masolo United Football Club (simply known as Masolo United) is an Indonesian football club based in Pinrang, South Sulawesi. They currently compete in the Liga 4.

== Honours ==
- Liga 3 South Sulawesi
  - Third-place: 2021
