= PS Luwu =

Association football team in Indonesia

- Full name: Persatuan Sepakbola Luwu
- Nickname: Laskar Andi Djemma
- Short name: PSL
- Ground: Andi Djemma Field; Luwu Regency, South Sulawesi
- Capacity: 194
- Owner: PSSI Luwu Regency
- Chairman: Ahkam Basmin
- Manager: Andi Mammang
- Coach: Parambung Nizam
- League: Liga 4
- 2024–25: 4th, Second Round in Group E (South Sulawesi zone)
Home colours	Away colours

Persatuan Sepakbola Luwu (simply known as PS Luwu) is an Indonesian football club based in Luwu Regency, South Sulawesi. They currently compete in the Liga 4.

== Players ==
=== Current squad ===
As of 15 May 2022

Note: Flags indicate national team as defined under FIFA eligibility rules; some limited exceptions apply. Players may hold more than one non-FIFA nationality.

No.	Pos.	Nation	Player
—	GK	IDN	Ikhsan
—	GK	IDN	Muh. Alfathan
—	DF	IDN	Abd. Malik
—	DF	IDN	Aslan
—	DF	IDN	Galang Ramadhan
—	DF	IDN	Ikhwal Mansur
28	DF	IDN	Saiful
—	DF	IDN	Salman Zidane Alfarisi
—	MF	IDN	Adrian Paturu
—	MF	IDN	Akbar
—	MF	IDN	Aldi Firansyah
—	MF	IDN	Algi

No.	Pos.	Nation	Player
—	MF	IDN	Jusdi Mahendra
—	MF	IDN	Muyassir Hidayat
31	MF	IDN	Rahmat Hidayat
—	MF	IDN	Ramdhan
—	MF	IDN	Rehan
—	MF	IDN	Rizal
—	MF	IDN	Yusril
—	FW	IDN	Arham Dembele
—	FW	IDN	Chandra Chan
—	FW	IDN	Muh. Fahrian
26	FW	IDN	Raikard Dwi Yulianto

== Sponsorship ==
- Dwi Area
- Pemuda Pancasila Kabupaten Luwu
- PT Masmindo
- Alonzo Tri Mulya
- Ubas Extreme
- Marflex (apparel)
