= Persijo Jeneponto =

Association football team in Indonesia

- Full name: Persatuan Sepakbola Indonesia Jeneponto
- Nicknames: Kuda Turatea (The Turatea Horse); Butta Turatea
- Short name: Persijo
- Founded: 1999; 27 years ago
- Ground: Mini Turatea Stadium; Jeneponto, South Sulawesi
- Capacity: 3,000
- Owner: Jeneponto Government
- Chairman: Andi Sayyed Mursalim
- Manager: Islam Iskandar
- Coach: Makka Kasim
- League: Liga 4
- 2023: 3rd in Second Round of Group J, (South Sulawesi zone)
Home colours	Away colours

Persatuan Sepakbola Indonesia Jeneponto (simply known as Persijo) is an Indonesian football club based in Jeneponto, South Sulawesi. They currently compete in the Liga 4.

== Honours ==
- Habibie Cup XV Parepare
  - Champion: 2005
