= Makassar City F.C. =

Makassar City
- Full name: Makassar City Football Club
- Nickname: Magenta Warriors
- Short name: MCFC
- Founded: 2019; 7 years ago, as Alesha Football Club; 2022; 4 years ago, as Makassar City Football Club
- Ground: Telkom Makassar Football Field; Makassar
- Capacity: 2,000
- Owner: PT Sulawesi Makmur Pratama
- Chairman: Adi Novandi
- Manager: Hasrul Kaharuddin
- Coach: Arson
- League: Liga 4
- 2023: Quarterfinals, (South Sulawesi zone)
Home colours	Away colours

Makassar City Football Club (formerly known as Alesha Football Club) is an Indonesian football club based in Makassar, South Sulawesi. They currently compete in the Liga 4 South Sulawesi zone.

== Honours ==
- Liga 4 South Sulawesi
  - Champion (1): 2025–26
