= Persipare Parepare =

Indonesian football club

- Full name: Persatuan Sepakbola Indonesia Parepare
- Nicknames: Laskar Madani; The Green Force
- Founded: 1960; 66 years ago
- Ground: Gelora B. J. Habibie Stadium
- Capacity: 8,000
- Owner: Askot PSSI Parepare
- Chairman: Arbi Agus
- Manager: Ardiansyah Arifuddin
- Coach: Faisal Rizal
- League: Liga 4
- 2024–25: 3rd, in Group A (South Sulawesi zone)
Home colours	Away colours

Persipare stand for Persatuan Sepakbola Indonesia Parepare (en: Football Association of Indonesia Parepare). Persipare Parepare is an Indonesian football club based in Parepare, South Sulawesi. Club played in Liga 4.
