= Persipangkep Pangkajene and Islands =

Association football team in Indonesia

Persipangkep
- Full name: Persatuan Sepakbola Indonesia Pangkajene dan Kepulauan
- Nicknames: Bandeng Pangkajane; Laskar Andi Mappe
- Founded: 1962; 64 years ago
- Ground: Andi Mappe Stadium; Pangkajene and Islands Regency, South Sulawesi
- Capacity: 10,000
- Owner: Pangkajene and Islands Government
- Chairman: Budiamin
- Coach: Yusrifar Djafar
- League: Liga 4
- 2021: 4th in Second Round of Group H, (South Sulawesi zone)
Home colours	Away colours

Persatuan Sepakbola Indonesia Pangkajene dan Kepulauan (simply known as Persipangkep) is an Indonesian football club based in Pangkajene and Islands Regency, South Sulawesi. They currently compete in the Liga 4 South Sulawesi zone.

== Honours ==
- Habibie Cup
  - Champion (1): 2008
- Liga 3 South Sulawesi
  - Third-place (1): 2018
