= Perslutim East Luwu =

Association football team in Indonesia

Perslutim
- Full name: Persatuan Sepakbola Luwu Timur
- Nickname: Laskar Bumi Batara Guru
- Founded: 2003; 23 years ago
- Ground: Andi Hasan Opu To Hatta Stadium
- Capacity: 5,000
- Owner: East Luwu Government
- Chairman: Amran Syam
- Coach: Ambo
- League: Liga 4
- 2024–25: 2nd (South Sulawesi zone); First round, 3rd in Group D (National phase)
Home colours	Away colours

Persatuan Sepakbola Luwu Timur (simply known as Perslutim) is an Indonesian football club based in East Luwu Regency, South Sulawesi. They currently compete in Liga 4 South Sulawesi zone.

== Honours ==
- Liga Indonesia Third Division South Sulawesi
  - Third-place (1): 2013
- Liga 4 South Sulawesi
  - Runners-up (1): 2024–25
