= MRC Bulukumba =

Indonesian football club

- Full name: Mr. Redmont Club Bulukumba
- Nicknames: Laskar Panrita Lopi (Boat Maker Warriors); Sang Pelaut (The Sailors)
- Short name: MRC
- Founded: 9 August 2021; 4 years ago
- Ground: Mini Bulukumba Stadium; Bulukumba, South Sulawesi
- Capacity: 500
- Owner: Arum Spink
- Manager: Arum Spink
- Coach: Andi Aksam Pratama
- League: Liga 4
- 2023: Withdrew, (South Sulawesi zone)
Home colours	Away colours	Third colours

Mr. Redmont Club Bulukumba (simply known as MRC Bulukumba) is an Indonesian football club based in Bulukumba, South Sulawesi. They currently compete in the Liga 4 South Sulawesi zone.

== History ==
This club is owned by the cafe company Mr. Redmont Cafe and is managed by Arum Spink, a prominent politician and legislator of the Regional Representative Council (DPRD) of South Sulawesi. This team was established in August 2021 and has been registered as a member of the Provincial Association of South Sulawesi PSSI (In Indonesian: Asprov PSSI Sulawesi Selatan). At the beginning of the club's formation, they had participated in the pre-season 2021 South Sulawesi Governor's Cup and are currently making their debut competing in Liga 3 South Sulawesi zone.

== Honours ==
- Liga 4 South Sulawesi
  - Runner-up (1): 2025–26
- Football Exhibition Bulukumba Local Competition
  - Runner-up (1): 2021
