= QDR F.C. =

QDR FC
- Full name: Quality Discovery Revolution Football Club
- Nickname: The Lions King
- Short name: QDR
- Founded: 17 June 2022; 3 years ago
- Ground: Kavaleri Field; Makassar
- Owner: QDR Group
- CEO: (Indonesia) Qadri Ramadhani Saputra
- Manager: (Indonesia) Sardi
- Coach: (Indonesia) Indra Yulianto
- League: Liga 4
- 2024–25: 3rd, Second Round in Group E (South Sulawesi zone)
Home colours	Away colours

Quality Discovery Revolution Football Club, commonly known as QDR, is an Indonesian football club based in Makassar, South Sulawesi. They currently compete in the Liga 4 South Sulawesi zone.

== Achievements ==
- Liga 3 South Sulawesi
  - Third-place: 2023–24
