= Mangiwang F.C. =

Indonesian football club

Mangiwang
- Full name: Mangiwang Football Club
- Nickname: Juku Mangiwang (The Sharks)
- Founded: 10 October 2023; 2 years ago
- Ground: Bosowa Sport Center Field; Makassar, South Sulawesi
- Capacity: 500
- Owner: PT Mangiwang
- Chairman: Ahmad Asyraf Thufail
- Manager: Abdul Madjid
- Coach: Yusrifar Djafar
- League: Liga 4
- 2024–25: 1st (South Sulawesi zone); First round, 3rd in Group I (National phase)
| Home colours | Away colours |

Mangiwang Football Club is an Indonesian football club based in Makassar, South Sulawesi. They currently compete in the Liga 3 South Sulawesi zone.

The name "Mangiwang" is taken from the Makassarese language which means "shark".

== Honours ==
- Liga 3 South Sulawesi
  - Champions (1): 2023–24
- Liga 4 South Sulawesi
  - Champions (1): 2024–25
