= Perspin Pinrang =

Association football team in Indonesia

Perspin
- Full name: Persatuan Sepakbola Pinrang
- Nicknames: Laskar Lasinrang (Lansirang Warriors); Bakka Lolona Sawitto
- Short name: Perspin
- Founded: 1999; 27 years ago
- Ground: Bau Massepe Stadium; Pinrang, South Sulawesi
- Capacity: 10,000
- Owner: Askab PSSI Pinrang
- Chairman: Faisal Thahir Syarkawi
- Manager: Harun Ali
- Coach: Rivai Arsyad
- League: Liga 4
- 2024–25: 3rd, in Group D (South Sulawesi zone)
Home colours	Away colours	Third colours

Persatuan Sepakbola Pinrang (simply known as Perspin) is an Indonesian football club based in Pinrang, South Sulawesi. They currently compete in the Liga 4.

== Honours ==
- Liga 3 South Sulawesi
  - Champion: 2019
  - Runner-up: 2017
