= Luwu Regency =

Regency in South Sulawesi, Indonesia

Kabupaten Luwu Kabuaten Luwu
- Regency
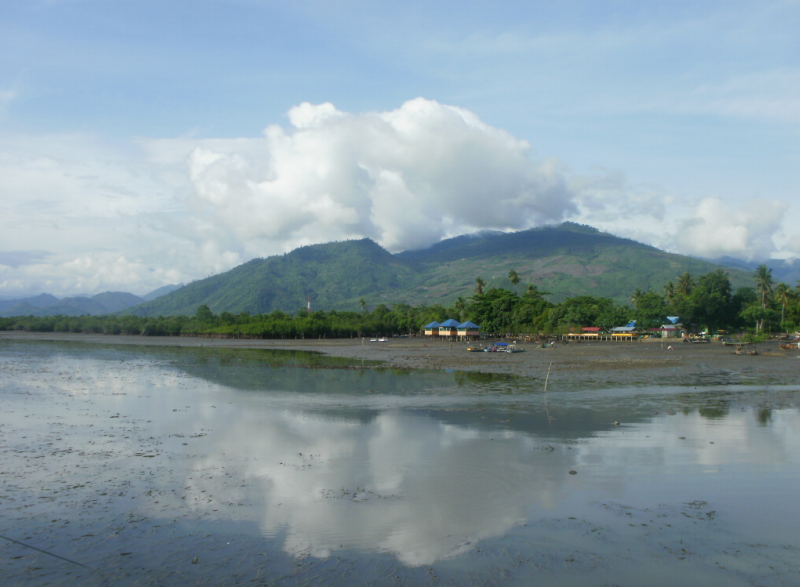
- Bua beach in Luwu

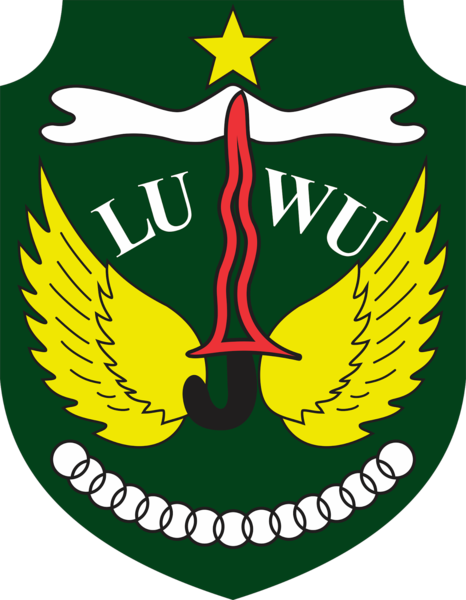
- Coat of arms
- Motto(s): Luwu wanua mappatuoe naewai alena, toddo puli temmalara
- Location within South Sulawesi
- Coordinates: 3.382509°S 120.368958°E
- Country: Indonesia
- Province: South Sulawesi
- Anniversary: 23 January 1268; 758 years ago
- Capital: Belopa

Government
  - Regent: Patahuddin
  - Vice Regent: Muhammad Dhevy Bijak

Area
  - Total: 3,000.25 km^{2} (1,158.40 sq mi)

Population (mid 2025 estimate)
  - Total: 391,114
  - Density: 130.360/km^{2} (337.632/sq mi)
- Time zone: UTC+8 (WITA)
- Website: https://luwukab.go.id

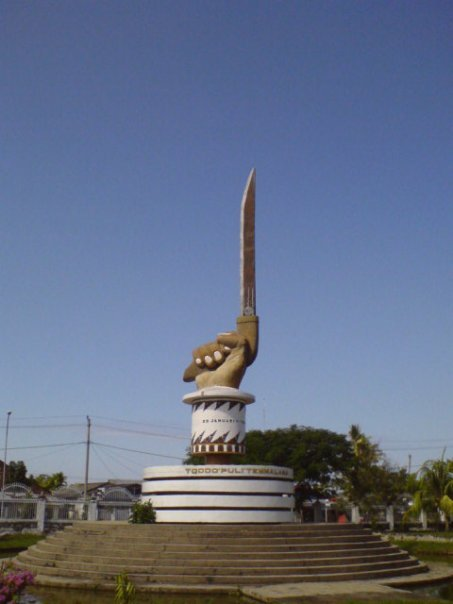
A heroic symbol against colonialism in Downtown Palopo.

Luwu Regency (Kabupaten Luwu in Indonesian) is a regency in South Sulawesi Province, Indonesia. On 20 April 1999, the northern districts of the original regency were separated to form North Luwu Regency. Subsequently, on 25 February 2003, some districts of North Luwu Regency were further split off to establish East Luwu Regency. Additionally, the former capital of Luwu Regency, Palopo, was designated as an independent municipality (city) on 10 April 2002, splitting the residual area of the regency into two geographically separate sections.

The current Luwu Regency covers a land area of 3,000.25 km^{2}. It had a population of 287,472 at the 2010 Census and 365,608 at the 2020 Census. The official population estimate as of mid 2025 was 391,114 (comprising 197,342 males and 193,772 females). The administrative capital is now located in Belopa.

The first regent of the reduced Luwu Regency was H. M. Basmin Mattayang, who served from 2004 to 2009. He was succeeded by Ir. H. Andi Mudzakkar, who became regent following Luwu's first direct election and served from 2009 to 2014. Mudzakkar was re-elected for a second five-year term in 2014. In 2019, Drs. H. M. Basmin Mattayang, M.Pd., returned as regent for a second term. On 21 February 2024, Muhammad Saleh assumed the position of regent.

Luwu is known for its natural resources, which include rice, cocoa, coconut, bananas, sago (sagu), rambutan, and langsat.

== History ==
Luwu derives its name from the Luwu Kingdom, one of the three largest and oldest kingdoms in South Sulawesi. The other two were the Gowa-Tallo Kingdom (which later became Gowa Regency and Makassar) and the Bone Kingdom (which became Bone Regency). The name "Luwu" has been known since the 13th century when the first king of the Lontara period of Luwu was crowned. The history of Luwu is divided into two periods: the Galigo period and the Lontara period.

The Galigo period is named after La Galigo or I La Galigo, an ancient literary work considered the longest epic in the world. It was discovered by B.F. Matthes in 1888. According to R.A. Kern, a Dutch historian, the Galigo period represents a pre-historic era. However, other historians have described La Galigo as pseudo-history. In I La Galigo, three places are frequently mentioned: Wara, Luwu, and Wewangriu, which are collectively referred to as Tompotikka.

Sanusi Daeng Mattata, the author of Luwu dalam Revolusi, stated that the name "Luwu" is derived from riulo, which means "divinely extended from above." This name is linked to a sacred oral tradition in Luwu. According to this tradition, the world was divinely extended from the sky, prepared, and blessed with abundant natural resources.

The origin of the name "Luwu" is also linked to the words malucca (from the Bugis Ware' language) and malutu (from the Palili' language), both of which mean "turbid" or "dark." Turbid refers to being full of content, like the color of a river during a flood, while dark symbolizes forests and sago plants near the coast. Over time, malucca and malutu evolved into malu, which eventually became Luwu.

C. Salombe, in his book, stated that the word "Lu" in "Luwu" is derived from the word lau, which means "sea" or "east." Salombe explained that the people of Luwu refer to those living in the mountains or the west as "Toraja." The term To Raja or To Riaja translates to "people of the highlands" or "people in the west." Conversely, the Toraja people refer to those living near the coast, in the east, or in the lowlands as "Luwu" or "Lu."

== Geographic condition ==
Geographically, Luwu Regency is situated between 2°3’45” and 3°37’30” South Latitude and 119°15” and 121°43’11” East Longitude. Its administrative borders are as follows:

North	North Luwu Regency and Tana Toraja Regency
South	Sidenreng Rappang Regency and Wajo Regency
West	Tana Toraja Regency and Enrekang Regency
East	Southeast Sulawesi Province, across the Bone Gulf

Luwu Regency is divided into two geographically separate areas, with the city of Palopo located between them. The northern area consists of six districts: Walenrang, Walenrang Timur (East Walenrang), Lamasi, Walenrang Utara (North Walenrang), Walenrang Barat (West Walenrang), and Lamasi Timur (East Lamasi). These districts are collectively referred to as "Walmas." The southern area includes the remaining sixteen districts, as listed below.

== Climate ==
Luwu regency has a tropical rainforest climate (Af), characterized by heavy to very heavy rainfall throughout the year. The following climate data is for Belopa, the seat of the regency.

Climate data for Belopa
Month	Jan	Feb	Mar	Apr	May	Jun	Jul	Aug	Sep	Oct	Nov	Dec	Year
Mean daily maximum °C (°F)	30.4 (86.7)	30.5 (86.9)	30.7 (87.3)	31.0 (87.8)	31.1 (88.0)	30.4 (86.7)	30.1 (86.2)	30.9 (87.6)	31.5 (88.7)	32.3 (90.1)	31.7 (89.1)	30.8 (87.4)	31.0 (87.7)
Daily mean °C (°F)	26.8 (80.2)	26.8 (80.2)	26.9 (80.4)	27.1 (80.8)	27.3 (81.1)	26.6 (79.9)	26.0 (78.8)	26.4 (79.5)	26.8 (80.2)	27.5 (81.5)	27.4 (81.3)	27.0 (80.6)	26.9 (80.4)
Mean daily minimum °C (°F)	23.2 (73.8)	23.2 (73.8)	23.2 (73.8)	23.3 (73.9)	23.5 (74.3)	22.8 (73.0)	21.9 (71.4)	21.9 (71.4)	22.1 (71.8)	22.7 (72.9)	23.2 (73.8)	23.3 (73.9)	22.9 (73.1)
Average rainfall mm (inches)	157 (6.2)	160 (6.3)	171 (6.7)	231 (9.1)	361 (14.2)	294 (11.6)	227 (8.9)	210 (8.3)	207 (8.1)	134 (5.3)	122 (4.8)	153 (6.0)	2,427 (95.5)
Source: Climate-Data.org

== Administration ==
In 2010, Luwu Regency comprised 21 administrative districts (Kecamatan). However, an additional district, Basse Sangtempe Utara, was later created from part of Basse Sangtempe District. The 22 districts are listed below, along with their populations from the 2010 and 2020 censuses, as well as the official estimates as of mid 2025. The table also includes the locations of the district administrative centers, the number of administrative villages in each district (a total of 207 rural desa and 20 urban kelurahan), and their postal codes.

Kode Wilayah	Name of District (kecamatan)	Area in km^{2}	Pop'n census 2010	Pop'n census 2020	Pop'n estimate mid 2025	Admin centre	No. of villages	Post code
73.17.02	Larompong	225.25	18,834	22,348	23,858	Larompong	13 ^{(a)}	91997
73.17.10	Larompong Selatan (South Larompong)	131.00	15,800	17,777	18,854	Bone Pute	10 ^{(a)}	91998
73.17.03	Suli	81.75	18,479	21,272	23,115	Suli	13 ^{(a)}	91985
73.17.19	Suli Barat (West Suli)	153.50	8,491	10,441	10,728	Lindajang	8 ^{(a)}	91986
73.17.07	Belopa	59.26	14,812	19,277	20,899	Tanamanai	9 ^{(b)}	91983
73.17.13	Kamanre	52.44	11,238	11,967	13,231	Cilallang	8 ^{(a)}	91994
73.17.14	Belopa Utara (North Belopa)	34.73	14,545	18,435	19,687	Pammanu	8 ^{(c)}	91984
73.17.04	Bajo	68.52	14,238	16,329	18,067	Bajo	12 ^{(a)}	91995
73.17.20	Bajo Barat (West Bajo)	66.30	9,324	10,136	11,216	Bonelemo	9	91996
73.17.01	Basse Sangtempe ("Bastem")	178.12	14,115	5,778	6,429	Lissaga	12	91990
73.17.12	Latimojong	467.75	5,457	5,924	7,682	Pajang	12	91921
73.17.22	Basse Sangtempe; Utara (North; Basse Sangtempe)	122.88	^{(d)}	7,523	7,907	Pantilang	12	91992
73.17.05	Bua Ponrang ("Bupon")	182.67	14,451	15,456	16,374	Noling	10 ^{(a)}	91993
73.17.11	Ponrang	107.09	26,114	27,605	28,422	Padang Sappa	10 ^{(e)}	91999
73.17.21	Ponrang Selatan (South Ponrang)	99.98	23,744	25,467	27,449	Pattedong	13 ^{(a)}	91989
73.17.08	Bua	204.01	30,955	32,810	36,227	Bua	15 ^{(a)}	91991
Sub-totals	(southern sector)	2,235.25	195,587	268,120	290,145		174	
73.17.06	Walenrang	94.60	17,433	18,324	18,998	Batusitanduk	9 ^{(f)}	91950
73.17.17	Walenrang Timur (East Walenrang)	63.65	15,281	15,762	16,151	Taba	8	91951
73.17.09	Lamasi	42.20	20,364	22,765	23,179	Lamasi	10 ^{(a)}	91952
73.17.16	Walenrang Utara (North Walenrang)	259.77	17,744	18,726	19,726	Bosso	11 ^{(a)}	91953
73.17.15	Walenrang Barat (West Walenrang)	247.13	8,897	8,356	9,162	Ilan Batu	6	91951 -91952
73.17.18	Lamasi Timur (East Lamasi)	57.65	12,166	13,555	13,753	To'lemo	9	91951 -91952
Sub-totals	Walmas or (northern sector)	765.00	91,885	97,488	100,969		53	
	Totals for Regency	3,000.25	287,472	365,608	391,114	Belopa	227	

Note: (a) including one kelurahan - the district admin centre as named in each case.
(b) including 4 kelurahan (Balo-Balo, Senga, Tampumia Radda and Tanamanai). (c) including 2 kelurahan - Pammanu and Sabe.
(d) the 2010 population of the new Basse Sangtempe Utara District was included in the 2010 total of Basse Sangtempe District.
(e) including 2 kelurahan - Padang Sappa and Padang Subur. (f) including the kelurahan of Bulo.

On 24 October 2014, approximately 1,000 protesters expressed their anger that the House of Representatives did not include the proposed Central Luwu Regency in the planned creation of 65 new regencies and autonomous cities. The protesters, local residents, believed that Central Luwu was ready to become a separate regency, consisting of the six districts of Walenrang, East Walenrang, West Walenrang, North Walenrang, Lamasi, and East Lamasi. This would effectively leave the sixteen districts south of Palopo City to form a new South Luwu Regency.

== Natural resources and culinary ==
The most well-known dish in Luwu is kepurung (also called kapurung, pugalu, bugalu, or kapeda), made from the sago plant (Metroxylon sagu). Another dish made from sago is dange. Other local foods include pacco and bagea. Luwu is also known for producing fruits like durian, langsat (Lansium parasiticum), rambutan, and others.

== Culture ==
Luwu is the origin of La Galigo, the longest epic in the world, created before the Mahabharata. Some manuscripts of La Galigo are preserved in European museums, including the Leiden University Library. The La Galigo manuscript tells the story of Sawerigading and is well-known in Central Sulawesi, Southeast Sulawesi, Gorontalo, and throughout Malaysia. On 25 May 2011, the La Galigo manuscript in the Leiden University Library was inscribed in UNESCO's Memory of the World Register, recognizing its world significance and outstanding universal value.
