= Gasbar Barru =

Association football team in Indonesia

- Full name: Gabungan Sepak Bola Barru
- Nicknames: Meong Palo Karellae; Laskar Colliq Pujié (Colliq Pujie Warriors); Laskar Ramang (Ramang Warriors)
- Short name: Gasbar
- Founded: 1939; 87 years ago, as Bond Berru; 19 June 1960; 65 years ago, as Gasbar Barru
- Ground: Sumpang Binangae Stadium; Barru, South Sulawesi
- Capacity: 5,000
- Owner: Askab PSSI Barru
- Chairman: H. Suardi Saleh
- Coach: Ismanto
- League: Liga 4
- 2024–25: 4th, in Group C (South Sulawesi zone)
Home colours	Away colours

Gabungan Sepak Bola Barru (simply known as Gasbar Barru) is an Indonesian football club based in Barru, South Sulawesi. They currently compete in the Liga 4.

== Sponsorship ==
- Abustan Foundation (2021–)
- Bank Sulselbar (2021–)
- Bosowa Semen (2021–)
- Al-Barrur (2021–)
