= Bank Sulselbar F.C. =

Association football team in Indonesia

Bank Sulselbar FC
- Full name: Bank Sulawesi Selatan dan Sulawesi Barat Football Club
- Nickname: Pinisi Biru Hijau
- Short name: Bank Sulselbar
- Founded: 2006; 20 years ago
- Ground: Karebosi Field; Makassar, South Sulawesi
- Capacity: 2,000
- Owner: PT. Bank Sulselbar
- Manager: Ari Hidayat
- Coach: Ahmad Rajendra Paturusi
- League: Liga 4
- 2024–25: Semi-finals, (South Sulawesi zone)
Home colours	Away colours

Bank Sulawesi Selatan dan Sulawesi Barat Football Club (simply known as Bank Sulselbar FC or PS Bank Sulselbar) is an Indonesian football club based in Makassar, South Sulawesi. They currently compete in the Liga 4.

== History ==
As the name implies, Bank Sulselbar FC is a club owned by the company of PT. Bank Sulselbar. This club is more focused on coaching and producing talented players in age groups ranging from U-10 to U-22 who will compete in Liga 3. They were founded in 2006 when PT Bank Sulselbar which was then still called Bank Sulsel created an internal league to accommodate its employees to compete with each other. They started forming their academy team in 2016.

Total support from the Directors of Bank Sulselbar allows them to freely participate in various tournaments at local and national levels, including the Danone Cup, Menpora Cup, Soeratin Cup, and Liga 3. In their academy team, they have succeeded in becoming the only soccer school team in Indonesia that has qualified for the U-16 Menpora Cup national round four times in a row. Their best achievement in this event was reaching the semifinals in 2017 in Yogyakarta.

== Kit suppliers ==
- (Germany) Adidas (2017–now)

== Honours ==
- Liga 3 South Sulawesi
  - Third-place: 2018
- Makassar Mayor's Cup
  - Runner-up: 2018
