= Sinjai Regency =

Regency in South Sulawesi, Indonesia

Sinjai Regency Kabupaten Sinjai
- Regency
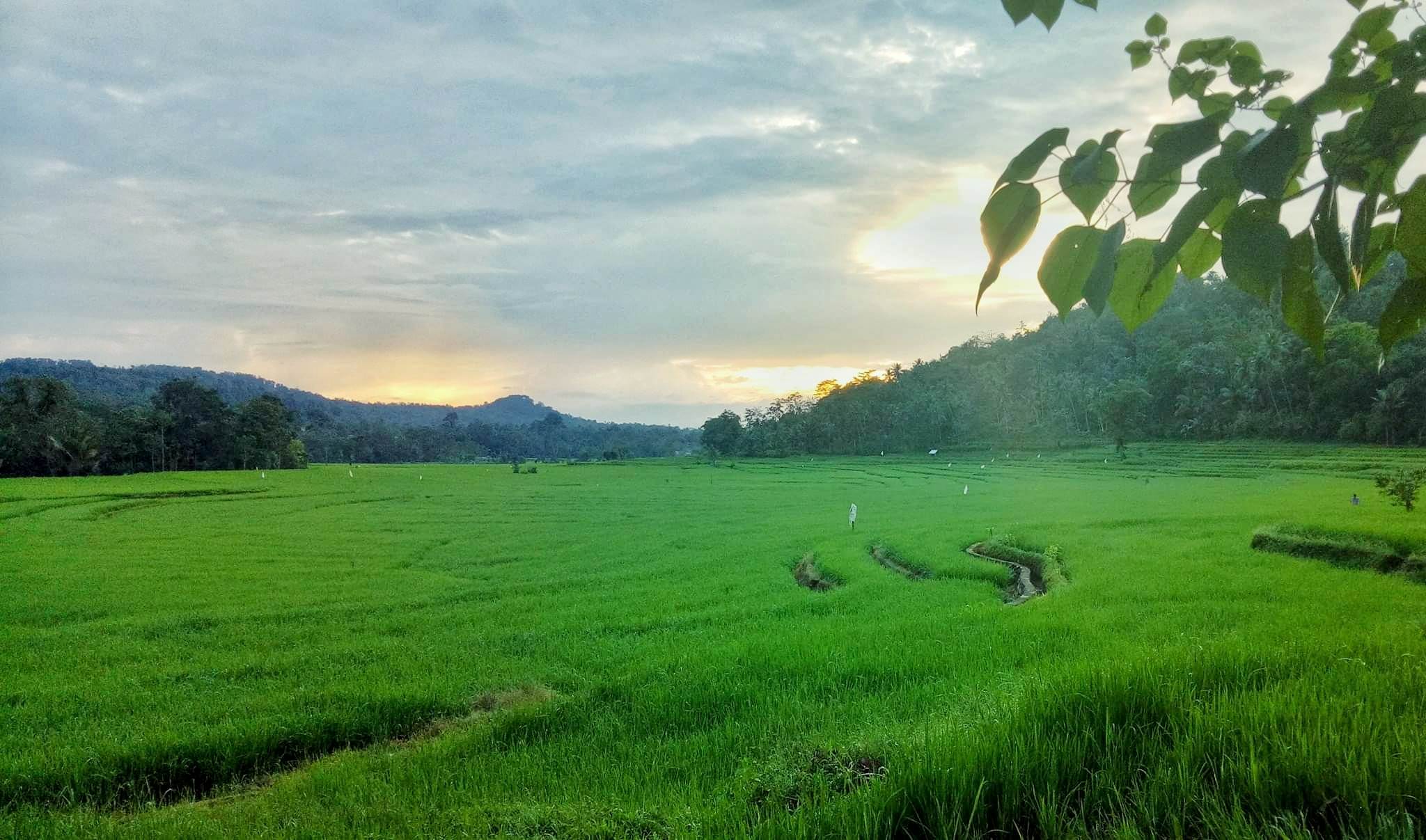
- Rice field in the village of Baru in Sinjai

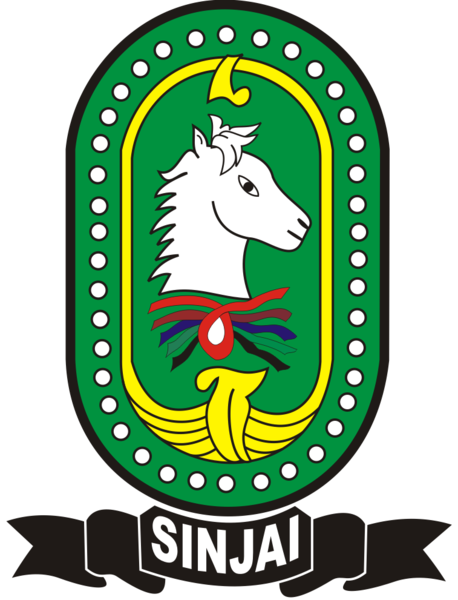
- Coat of arms

- Location within South Sulawesi

- Location in Sulawesi and Indonesia Sinjai Regency (Indonesia)
- Coordinates: 5°7′S 120°09′E
- Country: Indonesia
- Province: South Sulawesi
- Capital: Sinjai

Government
  - Regent: Ratnawati Arif
  - Vice Regent: Andi Mahyanto Mazda

Area
  - Total: 819.96 km^{2} (316.59 sq mi)

Population (mid 2025 estimate)
  - Total: 278,527
  - Density: 339.68/km^{2} (879.78/sq mi)
- Time zone: UTC+8 (Indonesia Central Time)
- Area code: (+62) 482
- Website: www.sinjaikab.go.id

Sinjai Regency is a regency of the South Sulawesi province of Indonesia. The regency, which is separated from the Bone Regency to its north by the River Tangka, covers an area of 819.96 km^{2}. It had a population of 228,936 at the 2010 census and 259,478 at the 2020 census. The official estimate of population as of mid 2025 was 278,527 (comprising 137,978 males and 140,549 females). It includes the Nine Islands (Kepulauan Sembilan) in the Gulf of Bone off the east coast of the southern peninsula of Sulawesi; this archipelago forms an administrative district within the regency. The regency's principal town lies at Sinjai, a port situated on the east coast of that peninsula.

== Sembilan Islands (Pulau Sembilan) ==
The small group of mountainous, forest-covered islands known as the Sembilan Islands lies on the east coast of South Sulawesi province and is northeast of the port town of Sinjai. Notwithstanding the name, ten named islands are forming the group, as Pulau Kanalosatu and Pulau Kanalodua are structurally linked and normally classed as one island (Kanalo). There are four administrative desa within the district.

In the south, the desa of Pulau Buhung Pitue (with an area of 2.15 km^{2}) covers the island of Pulau Burungloe. To the northeast, the desa of Pulau Harapan (1.75 km^{2}) covers the islands of Pulau Liangliang and Pulau Kambuno. Further north is the desa of Pulau Padaelo (1.80 km^{2}), which covers the island of Pulau Kodingare. Finally, north and west of Pulau Kodingare, the desa of Pulau Persetuan (1.85 km^{2}) covers the islands of Pulau Batanglampe, Pulau Kanalosatu, Pulau Kanalodua, Pulau Katindoang, Pulau Lapoipoi and Pulau Larearea.

== Administrative districts ==
The regency is divided into nine districts (kecamatan), tabulated below with their areas and their populations at the 2010 Census and the 2020 Census, together with the official estimates as of mid 2025. The table also includes the locations of the district administrative centers, the number of administrative villages in each district (totaling 67 rural desa and 13 urban kelurahan), and their postcode (s).

Kode Wilayah	Name of District (kecamatan)	(English name)	Area in kn^{2}	Pop'n Census 2010	Pop'n Census 2020	Pop'n Estimate mid 2025	Admin centre	No. of villages	Post code
73.07.01	Sinjai Barat	(West Sinjai)	135.53	22,985	25,873	27,738	Tassililu	9 ^{(a)}	92653
73.07.07	Sinjai Borong		66.97	15,901	17,718	19,197	Pasir Putih	8 ^{(b)}	92662
73.07.02	Sinjai Selatan	(South Sinjai)	131.99	37,055	40,473	42,629	Bikeru	11 ^{(b)}	92661
73.07.08	Tellu Limpoe		147.30	31,448	37,724	41,409	Mannanti	11 ^{(b)}	92681
73.07.03	Sinjai Timur	(East Sinjai)	71.88	28,971	33,765	36,841	Samataring	13 ^{(b)}	92671
73.07.04	Sinjai Tengah	(Central Sinjai)	129.70	25,966	28,337	29,921	Samaenre	11 ^{(b)}	92652
73.07.05	Sinjai Utara	(North Sinjai)	29.57	43,467	50,498	53,841	Balingnipa	6 ^{(c)}	92611: 92616
73.07.06	Bulupoddo		99.47	15,681	17,522	18,764	Lamatti Riattang	7	92654
73.07.09	Pulau Sembilan	(Nine Islands)	7.55	7,405	7,568	8,187	Pulau Harapan	4	92616
	Totals		819.96	228,879	259,478	278,527	Sinjai	80	

Notes: (a) including 2 kelurahan. (b) including one kelurahan. (c) all 6 are kelurahan.
