= Persiban Bantaeng =

Association football team in Indonesia

Persiban
- Full name: Persatuan Sepakbola Indonesia Bantaeng
- Nickname: Laskar Butta Toa (Butta Toa Warriors)
- Short name: Persiban
- Founded: 1967; 59 years ago, as Gasbob Bonthain
- Ground: Mini Lamalaka Stadium; Bantaeng, South Sulawesi
- Capacity: 5,000
- Owner: Bantaeng Government
- Chairman: Rilman Abdullah
- Manager: Ahmad Nizar C. Noor
- Coach: Didi Said
- League: Liga 4
- 2021: 4th in First Round of Group C, (South Sulawesi zone)
Home colours	Away colours

Persatuan Sepakbola Indonesia Bantaeng (simply known as Persiban) is an Indonesian football club based in Bantaeng, South Sulawesi. They currently compete in the Liga 4.
