= Persibone Bone =

Association football team in Indonesia

Persibone
- Full name: Persatuan Sepakbola Indonesia Bone
- Nickname: Laskar Paddengngeng (Paddengngeng Warriors)
- Short name: BON
- Founded: 1980; 46 years ago
- Ground: La Patau Stadium; Bone, South Sulawesi
- Capacity: 10,000
- Owner: PSSI Bone Regency
- Chairman: Bustanil Arifin Amri
- Manager: Andi Muhammad Wahyu Herman
- Coach: Arman Arsyad
- League: Liga 4
- 2024–25: Semi-finals, (South Sulawesi zone)
Home colours	Away colours

Persatuan Sepakbola Indonesia Bone (simply known as Persibone) is an Indonesian football club based in Bone, South Sulawesi. They currently compete in the Liga 4.

== Honours ==
- Liga 3 South Sulawesi
  - Champion (1): 2022
  - Runner-up (1): 2018
