= Sultan Jaya F.C. =

Association football team in Indonesia

Sultan Jaya FC
- Full name: Sultan Jaya Football Club
- Nickname: The Horse
- Short name: SJFC
- Founded: 2018; 8 years ago
- Ground: Gelora Sultan Hasanuddin Field; Makassar, South Sulawesi
- Capacity: 5,000
- Owner: PT Sultan Jaya Klub Sepakbola
- Chairman: H. Muhammad Faisal
- Manager: Benyamin
- Coach: Herman Rante
- League: Liga 4
- 2024–25: 3rd, in Group B (South Sulawesi zone)
Home colours	Away colours

Sultan Jaya Football Club (simply known as Sultan Jaya) is an Indonesian football club based in Makassar, South Sulawesi. They currently compete in the Liga 4.

== History ==
Founded in 2018, Sultan Jaya made club debut into Indonesian football by joining the third-tier league Indonesian Liga 3 in 2019. In 2019, the club was registered as an official member of the Asprov PSSI of South Sulawesi and made their debut in the Indonesian League and they made it into the last 12 of the Liga 3 South Sulawesi zone.

== Sponsorship ==
- Sultanjaya Group
- Group Jaya Khisma
- Maestro Apparel (2019)
- Nike Apparel (2021)
- PT Persigowa Football Klub (2021)
- PT Anugrah Pratama Gowa (2021)
