= Jeneponto Regency =

Regency in South Sulawesi, Indonesia

Coordinates: 5°40′S 119°38′E

Jeneponto Regency Kabupaten Jeneponto
- Regency
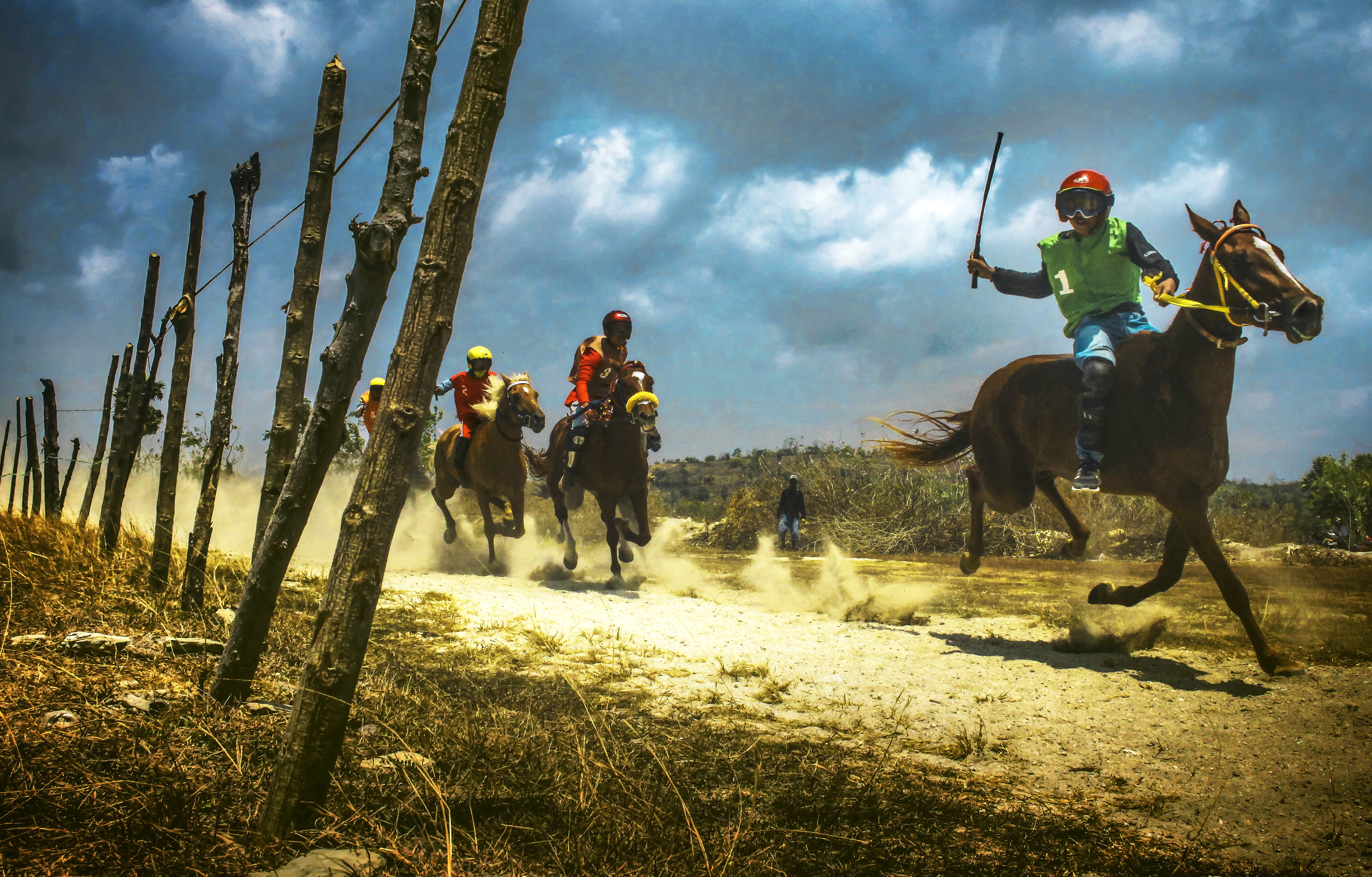
- Horse race in Jeneponto

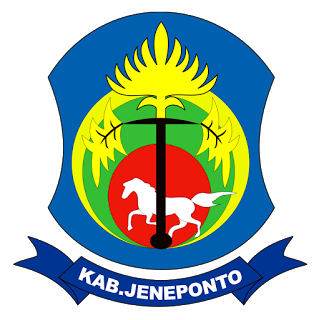
- Coat of arms

- Location within South Sulawesi
- Country: Indonesia
- Province: South Sulawesi
- Capital: Bontosunggu

Government
  - Regent: Paris Yasir
  - Vice Regent: Muhammad Islam Iskandar

Area
  - Total: 796 km^{2} (307 sq mi)

Population (mid 2025 Estimate)
  - Total: 426,298
  - Density: 536/km^{2} (1,390/sq mi)
- Time zone: UTC+08:00 (WITA)

Jeneponto Regency (Makasar: ᨍᨙᨊᨙᨄᨚᨈᨚ, romanized: Je’ne’ponto, Makasar pronunciation: [ɟʝeʔ.nep.ˈpʰɔn.t̪ʰɔ]) is a regency of South Sulawesi Province of Indonesia. It covers most of the south coast of the southern peninsula of Sulawesi, with a total area of 796.00 km^{2} and a population of 342,222 at the 2010 Census and 401,610 at the 2020 Census. The official estimate for mid 2025 was 426,298 (comprising 210,361 males and 215,937 females). The principal town lies at Bontosunggu. The northern part of the regency (including an inland salient towards the northeast, forming Rumbia District) consists of a plateau with an altitude of 500 to 1400 metres above sea level, the middle part has an altitude of 100 to 500 metres, while the south includes lowland areas with an altitude of 0 to 150 metres, including a coastline of 114 km on the Flores Sea.

== Etymology ==
The name Jeneponto derives from the Makassarese words jeʼneʼ (“water; river”) and ponto (“bracelet”), referring to the circular, bracelet-like formation of the Jeneponto River near its estuary. The settlement at the river’s mouth was also called Jeneponto (today known as Jeneponto Lama), where the Dutch established the office of the Onderafdeeling Jeneponto. From this river or this settlement, the name was extended to designate the entire regency. Historically, Jeneponto was regarded as one of the four principal tributaries of the Binamu kingdom.

== Administrative districts ==
Jeneponto Regency is divided into eleven Districts (Kecamatan), tabulated below with their areas and their populations at the 2010 Census and 2020 Census, together with the official estimates for mid 2025. The table also includes the locations of the district administrative centres, the number of villages in each district (totalling 82 rural desa and 31 urban kelurahan), and its post code(s).

Kode Wilayah	Name of District (kecamatan)	Area in km^{2}	Pop'n Census 2010	Pop'n Census 2020	Pop'n Estimate mid 2025	Admin centres	No. of villages	Post code(s)
73.04.01	Bangkala	130.84	49,859	59,420	63,726	Benteng	14 ^{(a)}	92352
73.04.06	Bangkala Barat (West Bangkala)	159.55	26,340	30,524	33,495	Bontogaddong	8 ^{(b)}	92353
73.04.02	Tamalatea	65.43	40,351	49,506	52,093	Tanetea	12 ^{(c)}	92350
73.04.07	Bontoramba	96.83	34,975	40,061	42,052	Bontoramba	12 ^{(d)}	92351
73.04.03	Binamu	67.31	52,520	63,570	66,068	Bontosunggu Kota	13 ^{(e)}	92311, 92314 - 92316
73.04.08	Turatea	58.52	29,919	35,084	36,203	Lebangmanai	11	92312 & 92313
73.04.04	Batang	30.83	19,192	21,519	22,253	Parang	6 ^{(f)}	92360
73.04.09	Arungkeke	32.03	18,233	21,318	23,515	Palenggo	7	92361
73.04.11	Tarowang	42.84	22,337	24,845	27,430	Allu	8	92362
73.04.05	Kelara	49.00	26,440	30,291	31,369	Bungunglompoa	10 ^{(g)}	92371
73.04.10	Rumbia	62.74	22,634	25,472	27,995	Bontopanno	12	92371 ^{(h)}
	Totals	796.00	342,222	401,610	426,298	Bontosunggu	113	

Note: (a) comprising 4 kelurahan (Benteng, Bontorannu, Pallengu and Pantai Bahari) and 10 desa.
(b) including one kelurahan (Bulujaya).
(c) comprising 6 kelurahan (Bontotangnga, Manjangloe, Tamanroya, Tonrokassi, Tonrokassi Barat and Tonrokassi Timur) and 6 desa. (d) including one kelurahan (Bontoramba).
(e) comprising 12 kelurahan (Balang, Balang Beru, Balang Toa, Biringkassi, Bontoa, Empoang, Empoang Selatan, Empoang Utara, Monro-Monro, Pabiringa, Panaikang and Sidenre) and one desa.
(f) comprising 2 kelurahan (Bonto Raya and Togo-Togo) and 4 desa.
(g) comprising 5 kelurahan (Tolo, Tolo Barat, Tolo Selatan, Tolo Timur and Tolo Utara) and 5 desa.
(h) except the 3 desa of Jenetallasa (post code 92314), Loka (post code 92516) and Bontotiro (post code 92572).
