= Persim Maros =

Indonesian football club

- Full name: Persatuan Sepakbola Indonesia Maros
- Nicknames: Kupu-kupu Raja (Monarch Butterfly)
- Short name: Persim
- Founded: 1950; 76 years ago
- Ground: Kassi Kebo Stadium; Maros, South Sulawesi
- Capacity: 15,000
- Owner: Askab PSSI Maros
- Chairman: Hairil Anwar
- Manager: Hairil Anwar
- Coach: Deny Tarkas
- League: Liga 4
- 2024–25: 4th, Second Round in Group F (South Sulawesi zone)
Home colours	Away colours

Persatuan Sepakbola Indonesia Maros (simply known as Persim) is an Indonesian football club based in Maros Regency, South Sulawesi. They currently compete in Liga 4 South Sulawesi zone.

Persim homeground named Kassi Kebo Stadium located in Maros, South Sulawesi.
