= East Luwu Regency =

Regency in South Sulawesi, Indonesia

Coordinates: 2°36′S 121°08′E

East Luwu Regency Kabupaten Luwu Timur
- Regency
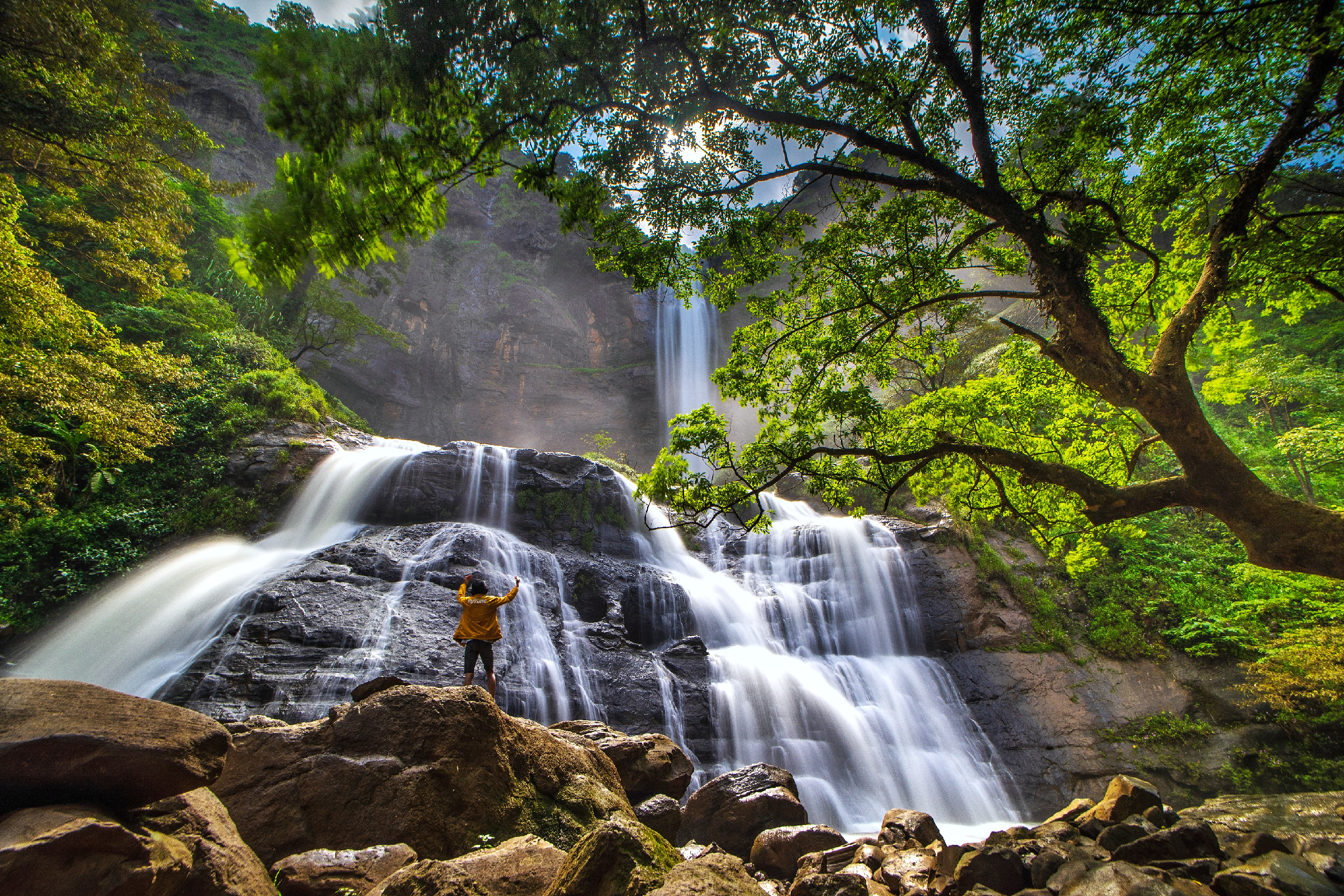
- Mata Buntu Waterfall, East Luwu

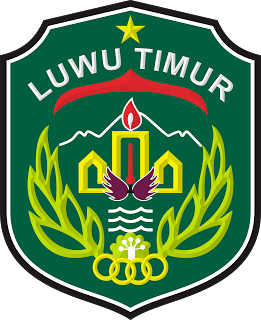
- Coat of arms

- Location within South Sulawesi
- Country: Indonesia
- Province: South Sulawesi
- Capital: Malili

Government
  - Regent: Irwan Bachri Syam
  - Vice Regent: Puspawati Husler

Area
  - Total: 6,747.93 km^{2} (2,605.39 sq mi)

Population (mid 2025 estimate)
  - Total: 326,591
  - Density: 48.3987/km^{2} (125.352/sq mi)
- Time zone: UTC+8 (WITA)
- Area code(s): +62 474 & 475

East Luwu Regency is the most easterly of the twenty-one regencies in South Sulawesi Province of Indonesia. The regency was created on 25 February 2003 by separation of the eastern districts from North Luwu Regency (itself only split off from Luwu Regency on 20 April 1999). It covers a land area of 6,747.93 km^{2}. The administrative capital of the regency is the coastal town of Malili on the Bay of Usu, itself an inlet in the northeast corner of the Gulf of Bone; the town, with its port of Balantang, is the shipping port for one of the world's major nickel-producing plants. The population of the Regency was 243,069 at the 2010 Census and 296,741 at the 2020 Census; the official estimate as at mid 2025 was 326,591 (comprising 168,685 males and 157,906 females).

== Malili Lakes ==
The eastern part of the regency contains the large natural fresh-water lakes of Lake Towuti (Danau Towuti) covering an area of 561 km^{2} in the south-east and Lake Matana (Danau Matana) covering 164 km^{2} further north, as well as the smaller Lake Mahalona (Danau Mahalona) between them. These (with the even smaller Danau Masapi and Danau Lontoa) form the Malili Lake system. Danau Towuti, which is 48 km wide, is the largest lake in Sulawesi, and contains the island of Pulau Luha within it. Danau Matana is the deepest lake in Indonesia (and the deepest lake on an island in the world), reaching a depth of 590 metres.

On the south shore of Lake Matana is the town of Soroako, the centre for the nickel processing plant, and its massive mine complex. Soroako, with its satellite villages of Wasuponda and Wawandula, are connected by a modern highway to the sea at Malili.

== Administration ==
East Luwu Regency is divided into eleven administrative Districts (Kecamatan), tabulated below with their areas and their populations at the 2010 Census and the 2020 Census, together with the official estimates as of mid 2025. The table also includes the locations of the district administrative centres, the numbers of administrative villages in each district (totalling 125 rural desa and 3 urban kelurahan), and its post codes.

Kode Wilayah	Name of District (kecamatan)	Area in km^{2}	Pop'n Census 2010	Pop'n Census 2020	Pop'n estimate mid 2025	Admin centre	No. of villages	Post code
73.24.07	Burau	275.40	30,875	34,214	36,885	Burau	18	92975
73.24.06	Wotu	147.64	28,100	33,345	35,976	Bawalipu	17	92971
73.24.08	Tomoni	274.69	22,333	26,406	28,830	Mandiri	13 ^{(a)}	92972
73.24.09	Tomoni Timur (East Tomoni)	44.86	11,738	13,741	14,266	Kertoraharjo	8	92970
73.24.05	Angkona	294.93	21,681	25,075	26,578	Solo	10	92985
73.24.04	Malili	883.62	32,699	42,826	48,681	Puncak Indah	14 ^{(b)}	92981
73.24.03	Towuti	1,926.13	27,200	42,087	51,609	Langkea Raya	19	92982
73.24.02	Nuha	859.71	20,087	23,399	25,263	Sorowako	5 ^{(c)}	92983
73.24.11	Wasuponda	834.85	17,969	21,610	22,946	Ledu-Ledu	6	92984
73.24.01	Mangkutana	1,147.02	19,839	22,232	23,139	Wonorejo	11	92974
73.24.10	Kalaena	59.08	10,548	12,032	12,418	Kalaena Kiri	7	92973
	Totals	6,747.93	243,069	296,741	326,591	Malili	128	

Notes: (a) including the kelurahan of Tomoni (with 3,662 inhabitants in 2024). (b) including the kelurahan of Malili (with 3,971 inhabitants in 2024).
(c) including the kelurahan of Magani (with 6,270 inhabitants in 2024)..

== Climate ==
Kanowit has a tropical rainforest climate (Af) with heavy rainfall year-round.

Climate data for Malili
Month	Jan	Feb	Mar	Apr	May	Jun	Jul	Aug	Sep	Oct	Nov	Dec	Year
Mean daily maximum °C (°F)	29.9 (85.8)	29.8 (85.6)	30.0 (86.0)	30.1 (86.2)	29.8 (85.6)	29.0 (84.2)	28.6 (83.5)	29.5 (85.1)	30.2 (86.4)	31.2 (88.2)	30.9 (87.6)	30.3 (86.5)	29.9 (85.9)
Daily mean °C (°F)	26.0 (78.8)	25.9 (78.6)	26.1 (79.0)	26.2 (79.2)	26.1 (79.0)	25.4 (77.7)	24.8 (76.6)	25.3 (77.5)	25.7 (78.3)	26.4 (79.5)	26.5 (79.7)	26.3 (79.3)	25.9 (78.6)
Mean daily minimum °C (°F)	22.1 (71.8)	22.1 (71.8)	22.2 (72.0)	22.3 (72.1)	22.5 (72.5)	21.9 (71.4)	21.1 (70.0)	21.2 (70.2)	21.2 (70.2)	21.7 (71.1)	22.2 (72.0)	22.3 (72.1)	21.9 (71.4)
Average rainfall mm (inches)	230 (9.1)	226 (8.9)	288 (11.3)	319 (12.6)	279 (11.0)	220 (8.7)	176 (6.9)	141 (5.6)	126 (5.0)	109 (4.3)	171 (6.7)	208 (8.2)	2,493 (98.3)
Source: Climate-Data.org
