= Bone Regency =

Regency in South Sulawesi, Indonesia

Bone Regency Kabupaten Bone
- Regency
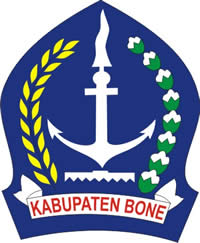
- Coat of arms

- Location within South Sulawesi

- Location in Indonesia
- Coordinates (Watampone): 4°32′19″S 120°19′47″E
- Country: Indonesia
- Province: South Sulawesi
- Capital: Watampone

Government
  - Regent: Andi Asman Sulaiman
  - Vice Regent: Andi Akmal Pasluddin

Area
  - Total: 4,559.0 km^{2} (1,760.2 sq mi)

Population (mid 2025 estimate)
  - Total: 836,715
  - Density: 183.53/km^{2} (475.34/sq mi)
- Time zone: UTC+8 (WITA)
- Website: bone.go.id

Bone Regency is a regency of South Sulawesi province of Indonesia. Originally the seat of the Bone state, it joined Indonesia in 1950. The regency covers an area of 4,559.00 km^{2} and had a population of 717,682 at the 2010 census and 801,775 at the 2020 census. The official estimate of population as of mid 2025 was 836,715 (comprising 408,759 makes and 427,956 females). Its main products are seaweed, rice, and fish. The administrative centre is the town of Watampone, which comprises the three districts of Tanete Riattang Barat, Tanete Riattang, and Tanete Riattang Timur within the regency.

== History ==
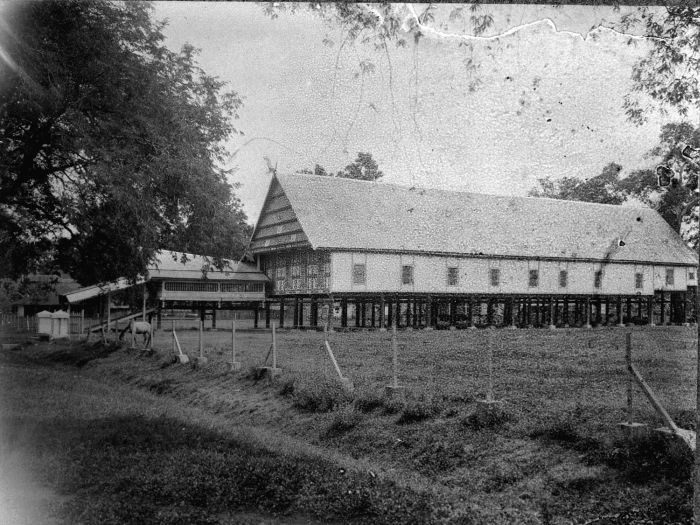
Palace of the Sultan of Bone, c. 1900-1920

Bone Regency was home to the Bone Kingdom, an adat-based Bugis kingdom which was founded by ManurungngE Rimatajang in 1330. It later entered an alliance with the Wajo and Soppeng kingdoms for mutual defense. This alliance became known as LaMumpatue Ri Timurung.

In 1605, during the reign of the tenth king of Bone Latenri Tuppu Matinro Ri Sidenreng, Islam entered Bone and caused a change in local culture, including a renaming of various aspects of the regal system. Bone State later enjoyed a period of prosperity in the middle of the 17th century.

In May 1950, the people held demonstrations in Watampone against the royalty and Bone's membership in the State of East Indonesia. This caused the sultan to step down and join Indonesia.

== Geography ==
Bone is located on the east coast of South Sulawesi. It has 174 kilometres (108 mi) of coastline and covers a land area of 4,559 square kilometres (1,760 mi^{2}). It includes a total of 88,499 hectares (884.99 km^{2}) of rice fields.

Bone Regency is surrounded by Wajo to the north, Sinjai to the south, Soppeng, Maros, Pangkkajene, and Barru to the west, and the Gulf of Bone to the east, where it has a sea border with Sulawesi Tenggara.

The climate of Bone is tropical, with the wet season from April to September and the dry season from October to March. The temperature ranges from 26 to 34 °C (79 to 93 °F), with air humidity averaging 95% - 99%. The average annual rainfall varies from less than 1,750 millimetres (69 in) to 3,000 millimetres (120 in).

== Demographics ==
According to a 2010 census, Bone Regency had 717,268 residents, consisting of 341,614 males and 376.068 females. This gave a sex ratio of 90.80 for the regency, or 91 males for every 100 females. It displayed a population growth rate of 0.67% per annum for the 2000-2010 period. At the 2020 census, Bone Regency had 801,775 residents, consisting of 391,682 males and 410,093 females. The mid 2025 official estimate was 836,715 (comprising 408,759 makes and 427,956 females).

The majority of residents of Bone Regency are Muslim, with numerous mosques and places for studying Islam. There are also some churches in Watampone.

== Administrative districts ==
Bone Regency in 2020 (as in 2010) comprised 27 administrative districts (Kecamatan), tabulated below with their areas and their populations at the 2010 census and 2020 census, together with the official estimates as of mid 2025. For convenience of location, these are grouped below into geographical sectors (which have no administrative significance). The table also includes the locations of the district administrative centres, the number of administrative villages within each district (totaling 328 rural desa and 44 urban kelurahan - 24 of the latter being in the town of Watampone), and its postal code(s).

Kode Wilayah	Name of District (kecamatan)	Area in km^{2}	Pop'n census 2010	Pop'n census 2020	Pop'n Estimate mid 2025	Admin centre	No. of villages	Post code(s)
73.08.01	Bontocani	463.35	15,351	17,741	18,193	Kahu	11 ^{(a)}	92767 & 92768
73.08.02	Kahu	189.50	37,399	40,663	42,020	Palattae	20 ^{(a)}	92767 ^{(b)}
73.08.03	Kajuara	124.13	34,599	36,897	38,138	Bojo	18 ^{(a)}	92777
73.08.04	Salomekko	84.91	14,970	16,638	17,515	Manera	8 ^{(a)}	92775
73.08.05	Tonra	200.32	12,830	15,064	15,805	Bulu-bulu	11	92774
73.08.27	Patimpeng	130.47	15,670	18,117	18,957	Latobang	10	92768
73.08.06	Libureng	344.25	29,165	31,943	32,444	Camming	20 ^{(c)}	92766
Sub-totals	Southern sector	1,536.03	159,984	177,063	183,072		98	
73.08.07	Mare	263.50	25,129	28,817	30,419	Kadai	18 ^{(a)}	92773
73.08.08	Sibulue	155.80	32,664	35,418	36,801	Pattiro Bajo	20 ^{(a)}	92781
73.08.10	Cina	147.50	25,437	28,438	29,668	Tanete Harapan	12 ^{(a)}	92772
73.08.09	Barebbo ^{(d)}	114.20	26,383	29,806	31,855	Apala	18 ^{(a)}	92771 ^{(e)}
73.08.11	Ponre	293.00	13,198	15,101	16,111	Lonrong	9	92765
Sub-totals	Eastern sector	974.00	122,811	137,580	144,854		77	
73.08.12	Lappariaja	138.00	23,183	26,970	28,124	Matango	9	92760
73.08.13	Lamuru	208.00	24,293	26,252	27,109	Lalebata	12 ^{(a)}	92764
73.08.25	Tellu Limpoe	318.10	13,771	16,064	16,468	Tujue	11	92771
73.08.26	Bengo	164.00	25,247	27,009	28,077	Bengo	9	92763
73.08.14	Ulaweng	161.67	24,504	26,937	29,028	Taccipi	15 ^{(a)}	92762
73.08.15	Palakka	115.32	22,084	25,548	27,925	Passippo	15	92761
73.08.16	Awangpone	110.70	28,583	33,773	36,274	Componge	18 ^{(a)}	92776
Sub-totals	Western sector	1,215.79	161,665	182,553	193,005		89	
73.08.17	Tellu Siattinge	159.30	39,733	45,711	47,965	Tokaseng	17 ^{(f)}	92752
73.08.24	Amali	119.13	20,546	21,257	21,931	Taretta	15 ^{(a)}	92756
73.08.18	Ajangale	139.00	27,203	28,547	28,670	Pompanua	14 ^{(g)}	92755
73.08.19	Dua Boccoe	144.90	29,941	33,154	34,485	Uloe	22 ^{(a)}	92753
73.08.20	Cenrana	143.60	23,362	26,574	27,401	Ujung Tanah	16 ^{(a)}	92754
Sub-totals	Northern sector	705.93	140,785	155,243	160,452		84	
73.08.22	Tanete Riattang Barat (West Tanete Riattang)	53.68	43,512	50,699	53,522	Macanang	8 ^{(h)}	92731: 92735
73.08.21	Tanete Riattang	23.79	48,532	52,335	53,566	Salekoe	8 ^{(j)}	92711: 92714
73.08.23	Tanete Riattang Timur ^{(d)} (East Tanete Riattang)	48.88	40,393	46,302	48,244	Lonrae	8 ^{(k)}	92715: 92719
Sub-totals	Watampone urban sector	126.35	132,437	149,336	155,332		24	

Notes: (a) including one kelurahan. (b) except for the desa (villages) of Biru (postcode 92714), Cenrana (postcode 92754) and Palakka (postcode 92761). (c) including the two kelurahan of Ceppaga and Tanah Batue.
(d) including several small islands off the east coast of the district. (e) except the desa (village) of Kading (post code 90225).
(f) including the two kelurahan of Otting and Tokaseng. (g) including the two kelurahan of Pompanua and Pompanua Riattang.
(h) all 8 are kelurahan (Bulu Tempe, Jeppee, Macanang, Macege, Majang, Mattiro Walie, Polewali and Watang Palakka).
(j) all 8 are kelurahan (Biru, Bukaka, Manurunge, Masumpu, Pappolo, Ta, Walanae and Watampone).
(k) all 8 are kelurahan (Bajoe, Cellu, Lonrae, Pallette, Panyula, Tibojong, Toro and Waetuo).

== Coat of arms ==
The coat of arms of Bone consists of a blue shield with a harrow, anchor, unsheathed kris, rice, cotton plant, and - at the bottom of the shield - the words Kabupaten Bone in red text on a white banner. The harrow and rice stand for the agricultural history of the area. The anchor signifies Bone's nautical prowess, while its symmetry and location in the middle of the shield represent rationality. The kris and red text signify bravery, while the cotton plant represents the Bone people's struggle for independence. The white banner stands for purity and holiness.

== Economy ==
The majority of Bone residents are farmers, commercial gardeners, and fishermen. In the area near the Gulf of Boni, seaweed, crabs, shrimp, and milkfish are the main source of income. Seaweed production averages 3,821.5 tonnes per annum, while catches of shrimp, crabs, and milkfish average 4,318 tonnes, 2,061 tonnes, and 4,964 tonnes per annum each. Catches of other fish, mainly tuna, average 73,763.5 tonnes per annum.

== Transportation ==
Bone's sea transportation is handled by five harbours, a larger one located in East Taneteriattang named Bajoe and four smaller ones.
