= Maros Regency =

Regency in South Sulawesi, Indonesia

Coordinates: 5°00′15″S 119°34′30″E

Maros Regency Kabupaten Maros
- Regency
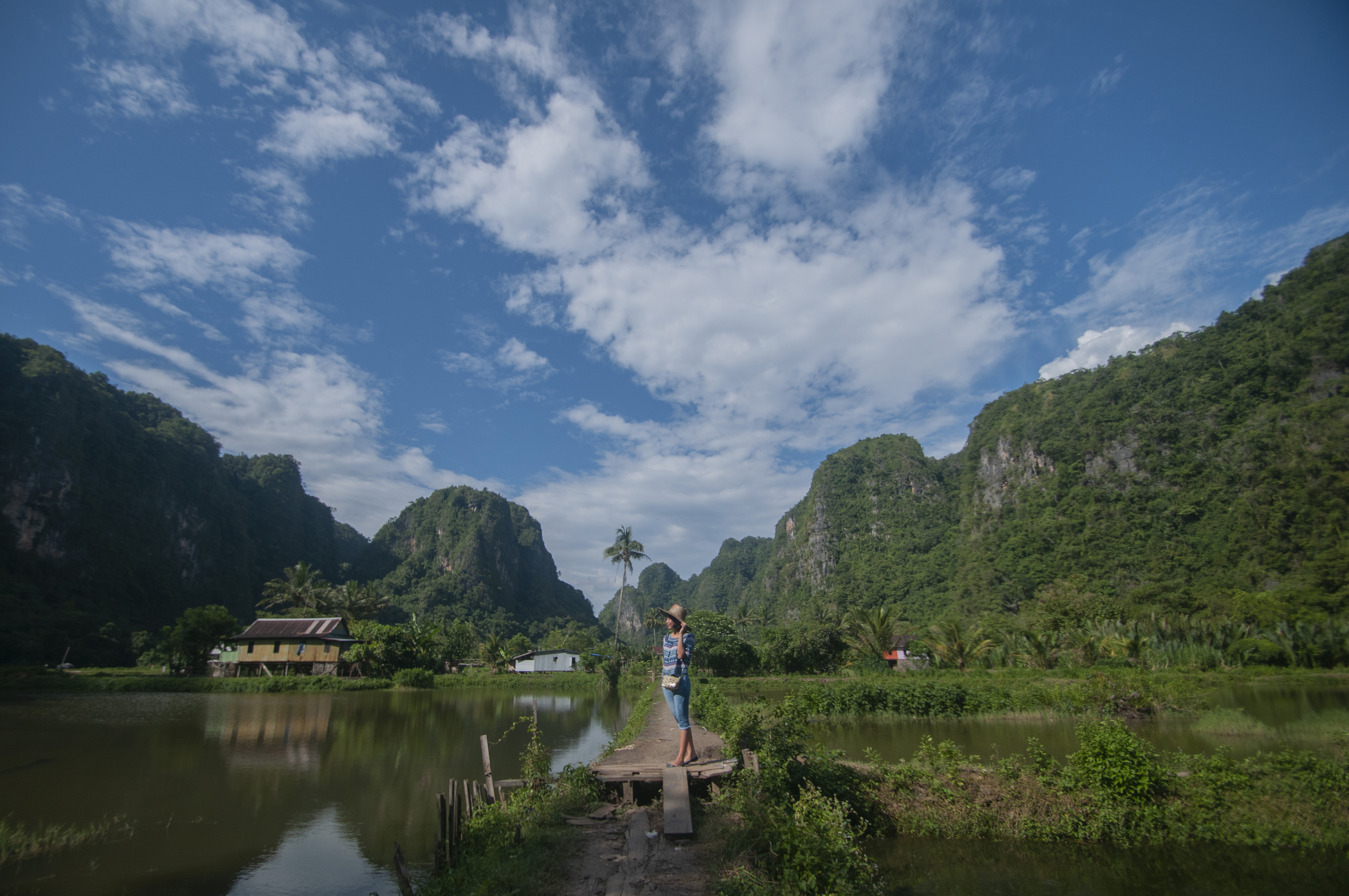
- Rammang-Rammang

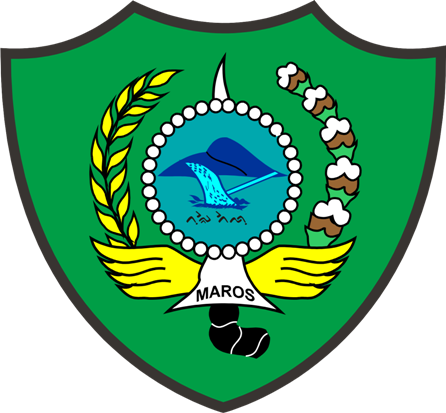
- Coat of arms

- Location within South Sulawesi
- Country: Indonesia
- Province: South Sulawesi
- Capital: Turikale

Government
  - Regent: Chaidir Syam
  - Vice Regent: Muetazim Mansyur

Area
  - Total: 1,442.5 km^{2} (557.0 sq mi)

Population (mid 2025 estimate)
  - Total: 414,720
  - Density: 287.50/km^{2} (744.62/sq mi)
- Time zone: UTC+8 (WITA)

Maros Regency (Makasar: ᨆᨑᨘᨔᨘ, romanized: Màrusu’, Makasar pronunciation: [ˈmarusuʔ]) is a regency of South Sulawesi province of Indonesia. It covers a land area of 1,442.5 sq.km, and had a population of 319,002 at the 2010 Census and 391,774 at the Census of 2020. The official population estimate for mid 2025 was 414,720 (comprising 212,401 males and 202,319 females).

Almost all of the regency lies within the official metropolitan area of the city of Makassar. The administrative centre of the regency is the town of Turikale (which had 7,209 inhabitants in 2024).

== Administrative division ==
The regency is divided into 14 districts (Indonesian: kecamatan), tabulated below with their area and population from the 2010 and the 2020 Census, together with the official end 2025 population estimates. The table also includes the locations of the district administrative centres, their postal codes and the number of administrative villages in each district (totaling 80 rural desa and 23 urban kelurahan).

Kode Wilayah	Name of District (kecamatan)	Area in km^{2}	Pop'n Census 2010	Pop'n Census 2020	Pop'n Estimate end 2025	Admin centre	No. of villages	Post codes
73.09.01	Mandai	38.1	35,044	51,801	54,783	Tete Baru	6 ^{(a)}	90552
73.09.13	Moncongloe	37.4	16,939	23,728	26,393	Moncongloe Bulu	5	90564
73.09.04	Maros Baru (Maros Town)	39.5	23,987	28,360	30,571	Baju Bodoa	7 ^{(b)}	90511 -90516
73.09.08	Marusa	48.6	25,226	34,324	40,124	Temmapaduae	7	90511 -90516
73.09.14	Turikale	23.8	41,319	48,558	50,270	Petuadae	7 ^{(c)}	90511 -90516
73.09.12	Lau	41.6	24,201	27,542	29,646	Macini Baji	6 ^{(d)}	90513 -90514
73.09.05	Bontoa (Maros Utara)	64.0	26,573	30,604	33,163	Panjalingan	9 ^{(e)}	90554
73.09.03	Bantimurung	151.5	28,078	32,825	34,218	Kalabbirang	8 ^{(f)}	90561
73.09.09	Simbang	101.3	22,209	25,538	27,408	Jene Taesa	6	90560
73.09.07	Tanralili	77.0	24,456	30,964	38,709	Borong	8 ^{(g)}	90553
73.09.11	Tompobulu	259.4	14,104	15,932	18,204	Pucak	8	90565
73.09.02	Camba	121.7	12,554	14,223	13,725	Cempaniga	8 ^{(h)}	90562
73.09.10	Cenrana	208.1	13,593	14,562	15,235	Bengo	7	90524
73.09.06	Mallawa	230.7	10,719	12,813	13,342	Ladangae	11 ^{(i)}	90563
	Totals	1,442.5	319,002	391,774	425,791	Turikale	103	

Notes: (a) including the 2 kelurahan of Bontoa and Hasanuddin. (b) including the 3 kelurahan of Baji Pamai, Baju Bodoa and Pallantikang.
(c) all 7 are kelurahan - Adatongeng, Alliritengae, Boribellaya, Pettuadae, Raya, Taroada and Turikale.
(d) comprising the 4 kelurahan (Allepolea, Maccini Baji, Mattiro Deceng and Soreang) and 2 desa. (e) including the kelurahan of Bontoa.
(f) including the 2 kelurahan of Kalabbirang and Leang-Leang. (g) including the kelurahan of Borong.
(h) including the 2 kelurahan of Cempaniga and Mario Pulana. (i) including the kelurahan of Sabila.

Twelve of the fourteen districts tabulated above lie within the official metropolitan area of the city of Makassar; the remaining two districts (Camba and Mallawa), which together form the northeast salient of the regency (with just 6.36% of the regency's population in 2025), are not included in the metropolitan area.

== Demography ==
In 2000, 54.77% of the population were Bugis, 39.59% were Makassar people and 5.64% belonged to other ethnic groups.

== Rock art in Maros ==
Important examples of rock art exist in the Maros regency. At the Leang Petta Kere cave for example, in the Bantimurung - Bulusaraung National Park about 30 km to the north of Makassar, there are a number of red-and-white hand prints of animals and hands. The images were made by blowing red pigment around hands that were pressed on the surface of the rocks. These handprints are often accompanied by fruit-eating, pig-deer looking animals called babirusas. A total of 12 images were found on the walls of seven different caves in the area. The sites have been submitted to the UNESCO World Heritage Tentative list for possible inclusion.

The main site of the rock art is in seven caves around 40–60 km north east of Makassar. The oldest is a hand stencil located in Timpuseng cave with an estimated age of over 39,000 years. It is accompanied by a depiction of a female babirusa, from about 35,000 years ago. The panel where the art can be found is located 4 meters above the cave floor and 8 meters from the entrance.

In the 1950s, the rock art in the caves was discovered by a Dutch archaeologist, H. R. van Heekeren, but at the time, was not regarded as being especially significant. More recently, analysis of the pictures by an Australian-Indonesian team suggests that a number of the markings are over 30,000 years old. They were looking at mineral layers that were covering the images, and tracing the amount of radioactive uranium in them. This technique did not give an exact date, but it narrowed down the time when the images were possibly painted. The work suggests that early settlers in Asia were creating their own artwork at the same time, or even earlier, than artwork of this kind was being created in Europe.

The caves were of interest to the British naturalist Alfred Russel Wallace. Wallace visited the East Indies during the period 1854 to 1862 although he appears not to have spotted the artwork. Wallace discusses his visit to the region in his well-known book The Malay Archipelago first published in 1869.

Journal Science announced that hand print in Maros Cave by mouth spraying dye is in the sixth position of the 2014’s top ten science breakthroughs and is called as Indonesian Cave Art. The art of drawing in (Maros Cave) rocks has same old with inhabitant of the European land.

== Natural features ==
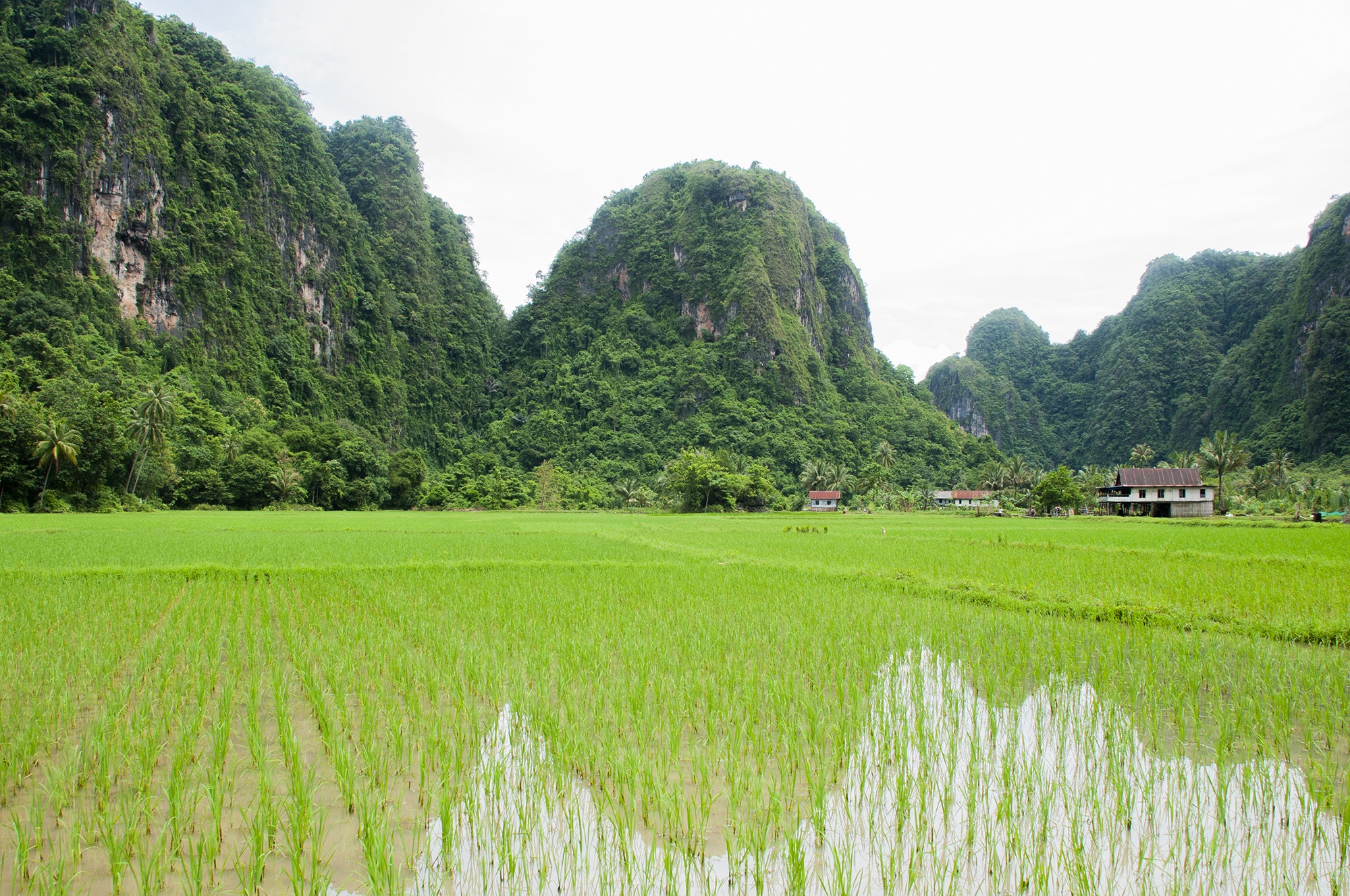
Karst of Rammang-Rammang near a rice field

Maros Regency is famous for its karst hills and cliffs which have been referred to as "The Spectacular Karst Towers".

The Karaenta Nature Reserve, best known for the Moor macaque monkeys (Macaca maura) in the park, is located in the Cenrana district (kecamatan) in the regency. Moor macaques are endemic to Sulawesi and are considered to be endangered because the remaining numbers are believed to be limited.

Caves The longest known cave in Indonesia is the Salukangkallang cave (27-kilometer in length). The cave is mostly in the Samangki Village Tourist Area (Kawasan Desa Wisata Samangki), but the entrance to the cave is in Labuaja village, nearby to Samangki village.
