= Pinrang Regency =

Regency in South Sulawesi, Indonesia

Coordinates: 3°47′S 119°38′E

Pinrang Regency Kabupaten Pinrang
- Regency

Local transcription(s)
  - Buginese: ᨈᨊ ᨄᨙᨋ
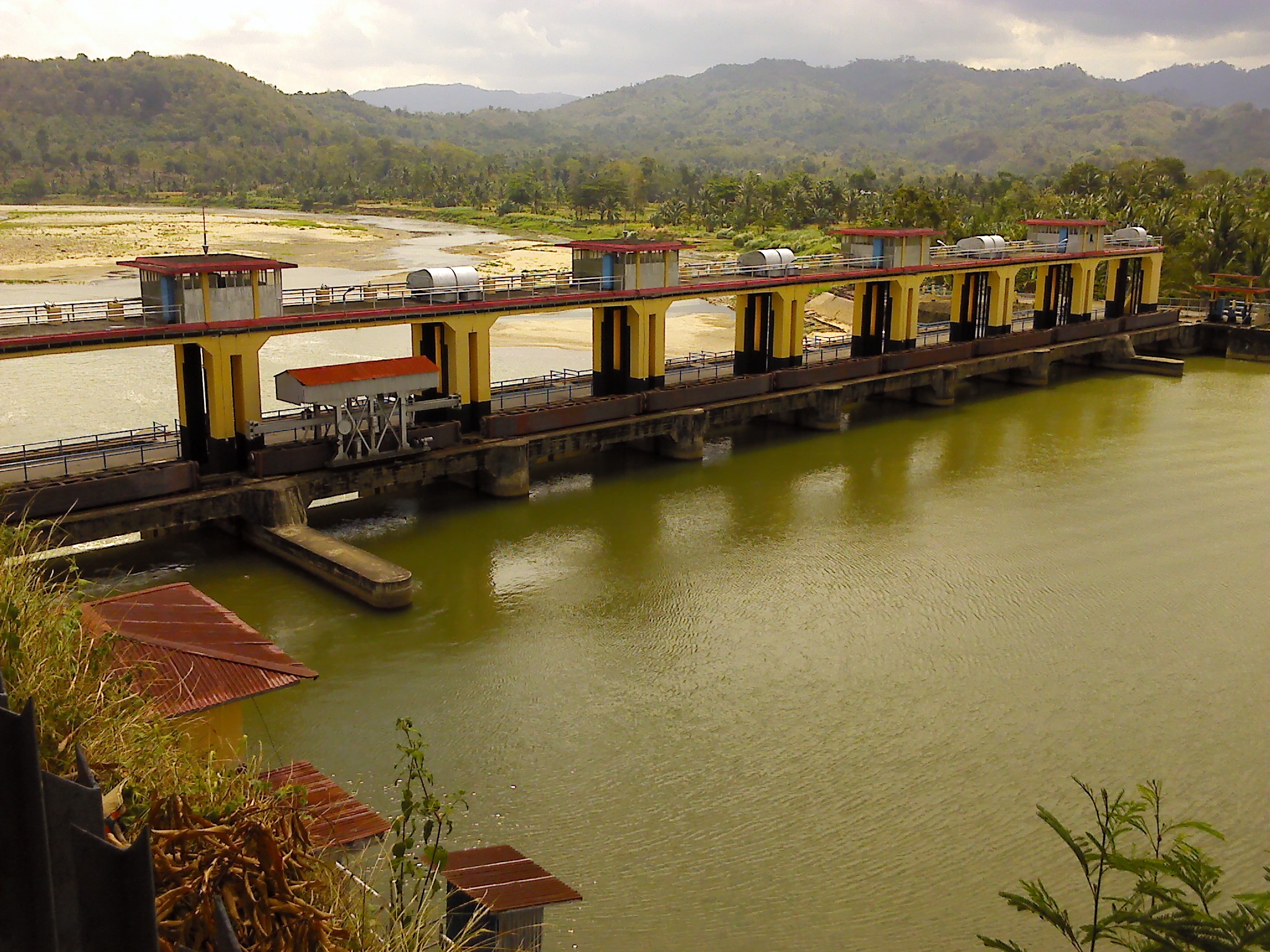
- Bendung Benteng (Benteng dam)

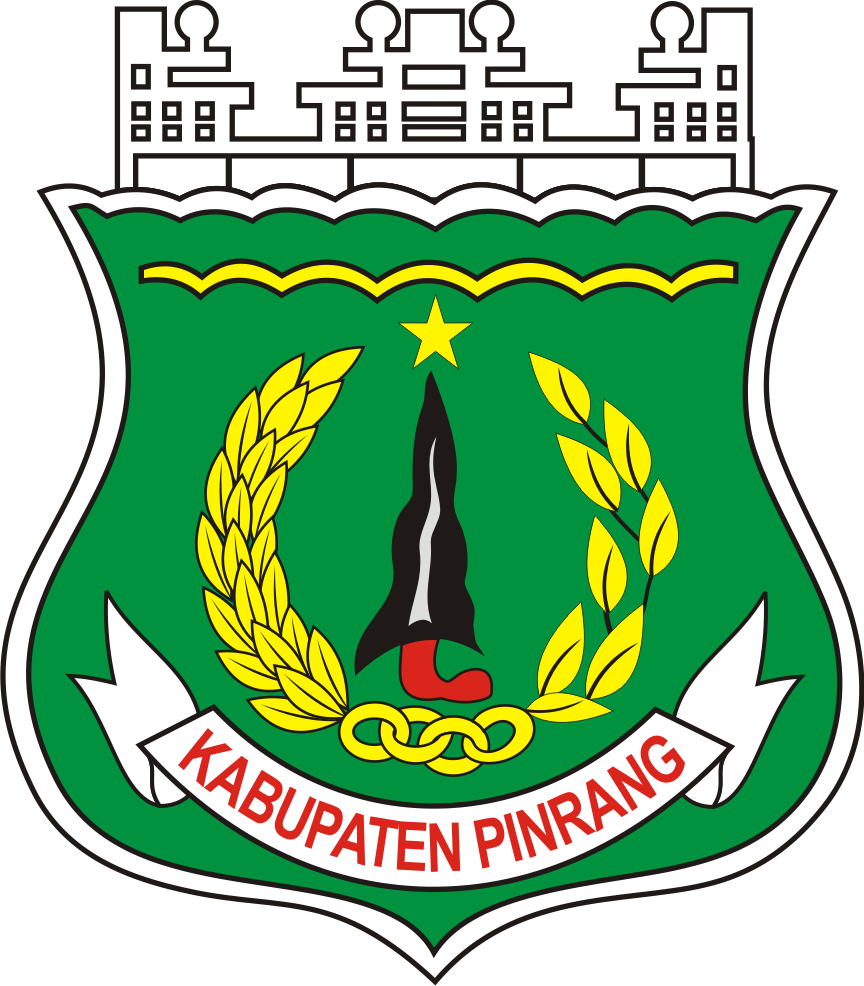
- Coat of arms
- Nickname(s): Bumi Lasinrang
- Location within South Sulawesi
- Country: Indonesia
- Province: South Sulawesi
- Capital: Pinrang

Government
  - Regent: Andi Irwan Hamid
  - Vice Regent: Sudirman Bungi

Area
  - Total: 1,896.57 km^{2} (732.27 sq mi)

Population (mid 2025 estimate)
  - Total: 427,785
  - Density: 225.557/km^{2} (584.190/sq mi)
- Time zone: UTC+8 (WITA)
- Area code: +62 421

Pinrang Regency (Indonesian: Kabupaten Pinrang, Buginese: ᨄᨙᨋ, romanized: Pénrang) is one of the twenty-one regencies in South Sulawesi Province of Indonesia. Pinrang town in Watang Sawitto District is the administrative capital of Pinrang Regency. The regency is situated in the northwest of the South Sulawesi peninsula, and covers a land area of 1,896.57 km^{2}. It had a population of 351,161 at the 2010 Census and 403,994 at the 2020 Census; the official estimate as at mid 2025 was 427,785 (comprising 211,330 males and 216,455 females).

== Administrative districts ==
Pinrang Regency comprises twelve administrative Districts (Kecamatan), tabulated below with their areas and their populations at the 2010 Census and the 2020 Census, together with the official estimates as at mid 2025. The table also includes the location of the district administrative centres, the number of administrative villages in each district (totalling 69 rural desa and 40 urban kelurahan), and its post code.

Kode Wilayah	Name of District (kecamatan)	Area in km^{2}	Pop'n Census 2010	Pop'n Census 2020	Pop'n Estimate mid 2025	Admin centre	No. of desa	No. of kelurahan	Post code(s)
73.15.02	Suppa ^{(a)}	69.78	30,504	34,434	36,536	Majennang	8	2 ^{(b)}	91273
73.15.01	Mattiro Sompe	90.46	27,441	30,155	31,960	Langnga	7	2 ^{(c)}	91261
73.15.10	Lanrisang	65.48	17,131	19,713	21,103	Jampue	6	1 ^{(d)}	91272
73.15.03	Mattiro Bulu	127.71	26,847	31,524	32,959	Bua	7	2 ^{(e)}	91271
73.15.04	Watang Sawitto	61.76	51,093	56,570	61,201	Sawitto	-	8 ^{(f)}	91211: 91221
73.15.11	Paleteang	46.32	36,699	42,630	44,352	Laleng Bata	-	6 ^{(g)}	91213: 91215
73.15.09	Tiroang	77.44	20,856	23,409	25,251	Tiroang	-	6 ^{(h)}	91256
73.15.05	Patampanua	124.02	31,533	37,577	39,753	Teppo	7	4 ^{(j)}	91252
73.15.08	Cempa	88.01	17,217	19,543	20,419	Cempa	6	1 ^{(k)}	91262
73.15.06	Duampanua	284.42	43,877	50,226	52,648	Lampa	10	5 ^{(l)}	91251
73.15.12	Batu Lappa	164.59	9,652	11,281	11,767	Bilajeng	4	1 ^{(m)}	91253
73.15.07	Lembang	696.54	38,268	46,932	49,836	Tuppa	14	2 ^{(n)}	91254
	Totals	1,896.57	351,118	403,994	427,785	Pinrang	69	40	

Notes: (a) including the offshore islands of Pulau Dapo, Pulau Kamerrang and Pulau Lawakkoang. (b) Tellumpanua and Watang Suppa. (c) Langnga and Pallameang.
(d) Lanrisang kelurahan. (e) Manarang and Padaidi. (f) Bentengnge, Jaya, Macorawalie, Penrang, Salo, Sawitto, Siparappe and Sipatokkong.
(g) Benteng Sawito, Laleng Bata, Macinnae, Mamminasae, Pacongang and Temmassarangnge. (h) Fakkie, Marawi, Mattiro Deceng, Pammase, Samaturue and Tiroang.
(j) Benteng, Maccirinna, Teppo and Tonyamang. (k) Cempe kelurahan. (l) Bittoeng, Data, Lampa, Pekkabata and Tatae. (m) Kassa kelurahan. (n) Betteng and Taddokong.

== Climate ==
Pinrang has a tropical rainforest climate (Af) with moderate to heavy rainfall year-round. The following climate data is for the town of Pinrang.

Climate data for Pinrang
Month	Jan	Feb	Mar	Apr	May	Jun	Jul	Aug	Sep	Oct	Nov	Dec	Year
Mean daily maximum °C (°F)	30.0 (86.0)	30.1 (86.2)	30.4 (86.7)	30.9 (87.6)	31.0 (87.8)	30.6 (87.1)	30.4 (86.7)	31.2 (88.2)	31.5 (88.7)	32.1 (89.8)	31.4 (88.5)	30.3 (86.5)	30.8 (87.5)
Daily mean °C (°F)	26.5 (79.7)	26.7 (80.1)	26.7 (80.1)	27.0 (80.6)	27.1 (80.8)	26.6 (79.9)	26.0 (78.8)	26.4 (79.5)	26.6 (79.9)	27.3 (81.1)	27.3 (81.1)	26.7 (80.1)	26.7 (80.1)
Mean daily minimum °C (°F)	23.1 (73.6)	23.3 (73.9)	23.1 (73.6)	23.2 (73.8)	23.3 (73.9)	22.6 (72.7)	21.6 (70.9)	21.6 (70.9)	21.8 (71.2)	22.6 (72.7)	23.2 (73.8)	23.2 (73.8)	22.7 (72.9)
Average rainfall mm (inches)	287 (11.3)	185 (7.3)	187 (7.4)	225 (8.9)	196 (7.7)	134 (5.3)	104 (4.1)	82 (3.2)	112 (4.4)	125 (4.9)	177 (7.0)	266 (10.5)	2,080 (82)
Source: Climate-Data.org
