= List of football clubs in Indonesia =

This is a list of football clubs in Indonesia. The governing body of football in Indonesia, the Football Association of Indonesia (PSSI), is in charge of the national teams and the Indonesian leagues, with the highest one being Super League.

== By province ==
League or status at 2026–27 season:

2026–27 Super League teams
2026–27 Championship teams
2026–27 Liga Nusantara teams
2026–27 Liga 4 teams

=== Aceh ===
Club	Home city	Stadium
Aceh Utara	North Aceh Regency	PT Pupuk Iskandar Muda Stadium
Adam Depok	Nagan Raya Regency	Nagan Raya Main Stadium
Al-Farlaky	East Aceh Regency	Gampong Beusa Field
AMSCO SIP	Langsa	Lamtrieng Gampong Teungoh Stadium
Benteng Gatra	East Aceh Regency	PSPB Stadium
Bintang Aceh	Aceh Besar Regency	Jantho Stadium
Bireuen	Bireuen Regency	Cot Gapu Stadium
Dewantara United	North Aceh Regency	PT Pupuk Iskandar Muda Stadium
Galacticos	Bireuen Regency	Galacticos Football Field
Juang	Bireuen Regency	Cot Gapu Stadium
Jeumpa	Bireuen Regency	Cot Gapu Stadium
Kuala Nanggroe	Banda Aceh	H. Dimurthala Stadium
Kuta Pasee	Lhokseumawe	PT Arun Stadium
Lhokseumawe	Lhokseumawe	PT Arun Stadium
Manyak Payed	Aceh Tamiang Regency	Teupi Sungai Field
Mutiara Raya	Pidie Regency	Kuta Asan Stadium
Patriot Aceh	North Aceh Regency	Rawang Itek Stadium
Peusangan Raya	Bireuen Regency	Cot Girek Paya Kareung Stadium
Persabar West Aceh	West Aceh Regency	Cot Darat Stadium
Persada Southwest Aceh	Southwest Aceh Regency	Guhang Raya Stadium
Persal South Aceh	South Aceh Regency	Ludung Mekong Stadium
Persas Sabang	Sabang	Sabang-Merauke Stadium
Persati Aceh Tamiang	Aceh Tamiang Regency	Teupi Sungai Field
Perskas Subulussalam	Subulussalam	Subulussalam Stadium
Persidi Idi Rayeuk	East Aceh Regency	Mon Sikureueng Stadium
Persijaya Aceh Jaya	Aceh Jaya Regency	Mini Lamno Stadium
Persikota Simeulue	Simeulue Regency	Simeulue Stadium
Persilatama Takengon	Central Aceh Regency	Musara Alun Stadium
Persimura Beureunuen	Pidie Regency	Mutiara Stadium
Persip Pasee	North Aceh Regency	Krueng Mane Stadium
Persiraja Banda Aceh	Banda Aceh	Harapan Bangsa Stadium
Persitas Takengon	Central Aceh Regency	Musara Alun Stadium
Pesat Southeast Aceh	Southeast Aceh Regency	Haji Syahadat Stadium
PS Aceh Putra	Lhokseumawe	PT Arun Stadium
PS Lambhuk 1948	Banda Aceh	Mini Gampong Lambhuk Stadium
PS Nagan Raya	Nagan Raya Regency	Nagan Raya Main Stadium
PS PTPN 1 Langsa	Lansa Regency	Langsa Stadium
PS Peureulak Raya	East Aceh Regency	Cot Kulam Pasir Putih Stadium
PS Pidie Jaya	Pidie Jaya Regency	Kuta Asan Stadium
PS PLN NAD	Banda Aceh	Harapan Bangsa Stadium
PS Simeulue	Simeulue Regency	Simeulue Stadium
PSAU North Aceh	North Aceh Regency	Mini Dewantara Stadium
PSAA Abulyatama	Aceh Besar Regency	Mini PSAA Stadium
PSAB Aceh Besar	Aceh Besar Regency	Mini Lamreung Stadium
PSAP Sigli	Pidie Regency	Kuta Asan Stadium
PSAS Aceh Singkil	Aceh Singkil Regency	Kasim Tagok Stadium
PSAS Babah Buloh	North Aceh Regency	Mini Babah Buloh Stadium
PSBL Langsa	Langsa	Langsa Stadium
PSGL Gayo Lues	Gayo Lues Regency	Seribu Bukit Stadium
PSKTS Kembang Tanjong	Pidie Regency	Kembang Tanjong Field
PSKBS Kuta Binjei	East Aceh Regency	TM Djafar Stadium
PSLS Lhokseumawe	Lhokseumawe	Tunas Bangsa Stadium
PSSB Bireuen	Bireuën Regency	Cot Gapu Stadium
Putra Langsa	Langsa	Langsa Stadium
Tiger	East Aceh Regency	Cot Kulam Pasir Putih Stadium
Tamiang United	Aceh Tamiang Regency	Musafat Field
Tajura Aceh	Southwest Aceh Regency	Putroe Aloh Stadium

=== Bali ===
Club	Home city	Stadium
Bali	Denpasar	Ngurah Rai Stadium
Bali All Star	Denpasar	Ngurah Rai Stadium
Bali United	Gianyar Regency	Kapten I Wayan Dipta Stadium
Bharata Bali	Buleleng Regency	Mayor Metra Stadium
Bintang Perkanthi	Badung Regency	Gelora Samudra Stadium
East Bali	Karangasem Regency	Wikrama Mandala Stadium
FSK Klungkung	Klungkung Regency	Pau Field
Indonesia Muda Bali	Tabanan Regency	Debes Stadium
PSAD Kodam IX/Udayana	Denpasar	Ngurah Rai Stadium
Persada Jembrana	Jembrana Regency	Pecangakan Stadium
Persaka Karangasem	Karangasem Regency	Yohana Wijaya Field
Perseden Denpasar	Denpasar	Kompyang Sujana Stadium
Persekaba Bali	Badung Regency	Gelora Samudra Stadium
Persibu Buleleng	Buleleng Regency	Mayor Metra Stadium
Perst Tabanan	Tabanan Regency	Debes Stadium
Pro Kundalini	Denpasar	Ngurah Rai Stadium
PS Badung	Badung Regency	Gelora Samudera Stadium
PS Bangli	Bangli Regency	Kapten Mudita Field
PS Gianyar	Gianyar Regency	Kapten I Wayan Dipta Stadium
PS Jembrana	Jembrana Regency	Pecangakan Stadium
PS Putra Angkasa Kapal	Badung Regency	Banteng Seminyak Field
Putra Pegok	Denpasar	Ngurah Rai Stadium
Putra Tresna Bali	Denpasar	Ngurah Rai Stadium
Sahadewa Galapagos United	Gianyar Regency	Kapten I Wayan Dipta Stadium
Semarapura United	Klungkung Regency	Pau Field
Singaraja Zona Fair Play	Buleleng Regency	Mayor Metra Stadium
Sportivo Buleleng	Buleleng Regency	Mayor Metra Stadium
Sulut Bali	Denpasar	Kompyang Sujana Stadium
Titan Alpha Bali	Denpasar	Kompyang Sujana Stadium
Tunas Muda Ubud	Gianyar Regency	Kapten I Wayan Dipta Stadium
Undiksha	Buleleng Regency	Mayor Metra Stadium

=== Bangka Belitung Islands ===
Club	Home city	Stadium
Babel Jaya	Pangkalpinang	Depati Amir Stadium
Belitong	Belitung Regency	Pangkallalang Stadium
KOP SS Belitung	Belitung Regency	Pangkallalang Stadium
SWN Belinyu	Bangka Regency	Orom Stadium
Persibabar West Bangka	West Bangka Regency	Bina Jaya Stadium
Persibel Belitung	Belitung Regency	Pangkallalang Stadium
Persipas Pangkalpinang	Pangkalpinang	Depati Amir Stadium
Porkab Koba	Central Bangka Regency	Porkab Stadium
PS Bangka	Bangka Regency	Depati Amir Stadium
PS Bangka Setara	Bangka Regency	Orom Stadium
PS Bangka Tengah	Central Bangka Regency	Porkab Stadium
PS Basel	South Bangka Regency	Junjung Besaoh Stadium
PS Beltim	East Belitung Regency	East Belitung Stadium
PS Muntok	South Bangka Regency	Junjung Besaoh Stadium
Putra Laut	Bangka Regency	Orom Stadium

=== Banten ===
Club	Home city	Stadium
Anyar Pratama	Serang Regency	Maulana Yusuf Stadium
Astam	South Tangerang	Skadron 21 Sena Penerbad Field
Bantara	Serang	Bantara Soccer Field
Banten Jaya	Serang	Maulana Yusuf Stadium
Banten United	Serang Regency	Maulana Yusuf Stadium
Billal	South Tangerang	Gagak Kodam Stadium
BBP Putra Wonogiri	Tangerang Regency	Mini Cisauk Stadium
Dewa United Banten	Serang Regency	Banten International Stadium
Duta	Lebak Regency	Pasir Ona Stadium
Harin	South Tangerang	Harin Soccer Field
Inter Banten	Serang	Banten International Stadium
Jagat	Cilegon	Seruni Stadium
Kanekes	Lebak Regency	Pasir Ona Stadium
Matrix Putra Brother's	Tangerang Regency	Mini Panongan Stadium
Mavericks	Pandeglang Regency	Badak Stadium
Nathan Lebak	Lebak Regency	Pasir Ona Stadium
Perserang Serang	Serang Regency	Maulana Yusuf Stadium
Persic Cilegon	Cilegon	Krakatau Steel Stadium
Persigon Cilegon	Cilegon	Krakatau Steel Stadium
Persikota Tangerang	Tangerang	Benteng Reborn Stadium
Persilebak Lebak	Lebak Regency	Pasir Ona Stadium
Persipan Pandeglang	Pandeglang Regency	Badak Stadium
Persira Rangkasbitung	Lebak Regency	Pasir Ona Stadium
Persita Tangerang	Tangerang Regency	Indomilk Arena
Persitangsel South Tangerang	South Tangerang	Mini Ciputat Stadium
Putra Tangerang	Tangerang Regency	Mini Cisauk Stadium
PSKS Krakatau Steel	Cilegon	Krakatau Steel Stadium
Raga Negeri	Serang Regency	Maulana Yusuf Stadium
Sanggeni Purnama	Serang	Maulana Yusuf Stadium
Serang Jaya	Serang	Maulana Yusuf Stadium
Serpong City	South Tangerang	Sabnani Field
Trisukma	Tangerang Regency	Trisukma Football Academy Field

=== Bengkulu ===
Club	Home city	Stadium
Avrilia Hafiz	Seluma Regency	Jengalu Field
Bengkulu Putra	Bengkulu City	Semarak Stadium
Bengkulu Raya	Bengkulu City	Semarak Stadium
Bengkulu Soccer Community	Bengkulu City	Semarak Stadium
Benteng HB	Central Bengkulu Regency	Semarak Stadium
Biru	Bengkulu City	Semarak Stadium
Gurita Kaur	Kaur Regency	Merdeka Bintuhan Stadium
Mutu	Seluma Regency	Jengalu Field
Persibeng Bengkulu	Bengkulu City	Semarak Stadium
Persibutara North Bengkulu	North Bengkulu Regency	Grimulya Stadium
Persiman Manna	South Bengkulu Regency	Sekundang Setungguan Field
Persipa Bengkulu	Bengkulu City	Semarak Stadium
Persirel Rejang Lebong	Rejang Lebong Regency	Air Bang Stadium
PS Bengkulu	Bengkulu City	Semarak Stadium
PS Benteng	Central Bengkulu Regency	Semarak Stadium
PS IM Bengkulu	Bengkulu City	Semarak Stadium
PS Kaur	Kaur Regency	Merdeka Bintuhan Stadium
PS Kepahiang	Kepahiang Regency	Padang Lekat Stadium
PS Lebong	Lebong Regency	GOR Lebong Stadium
PS Mukomuko	Mukomuko Regency	Pondok Lunang Field
PS Seluma	Seluma Regency	Lubuk Kebur Field
Religius	Rejang Lebong Regency	Pandawa Batalyon Infanteri 144 Field
Renal	Central Bengkulu Regency	Semarak Stadium
Tunas Muda Bengkulu	Bengkulu City	Semarak Stadium
Utara United	North Bengkulu Regency	Grimulya Stadium

=== Central Java ===
Club	Home city	Stadium
Afqoz	Tegal Regency	Tri Sanja Stadium
AT Farmasi	Surakarta	Mini Blukukan Stadium
Bajak Laut 2000	Semarang	Jatidiri Stadium
Berlian Rajawali	Semarang	Citarum Stadium
Bina Sentra Semarang	Semarang	Citarum Stadium
Bintang Timur Pekalongan	Pekalongan	Hoegeng Stadium
Ebod Jaya	Kebumen Regency	Chandradimuka Stadium
ISP Purworejo	Purworejo Regency	WR Supratman Stadium
Java United	Semarang	Jatidiri Stadium
Kendal Tornado	Kendal Regency	Kebondalem Stadium
Mahesa Jenar Muda	Semarang	Jatidiri Stadium
Persab Brebes	Brebes Regency	Karang Birahi Stadium
Persak Kebumen	Kebumen Regency	Chandradimuka Stadium
Persebi Boyolali	Boyolali Regency	Kebo Giro Stadium
Persegal Tegal	Tegal	Yos Sudarso Stadium
Persekap Pekalongan	Pekalongan Regency	Widya Manggala Krida Stadium
Persekat Tegal	Tegal Regency	Tri Sanja Stadium
Persibangga Purbalingga	Purbalingga Regency	Goentoer Darjono Stadium
Persibara Banjarnegara	Banjarnegara Regency	Sumitro Kolopaking Stadium
Persibas Banyumas	Banyumas Regency	Satria Stadium
Persibat Batang	Batang Regency	Moh Sarengat Stadium
Persiharjo Sukoharjo	Sukoharjo Regency	Gelora Merdeka Jombor Stadium
Persijap Jepara	Jepara Regency	Gelora Bumi Kartini Stadium
Persik Kendal	Kendal Regency	Kebondalem Stadium
Persika Karanganyar	Karanganyar Regency	Jati Jaten Stadium
Persikaba Blora	Blora Regency	Kridosono Stadium
Persikama Magelang	Magelang Regency	Gemilang Stadium
Persikas Semarang	Semarang Regency	Wujil Stadium
Persiku Kudus	Kudus Regency	Wergu Wetan Stadium
Persip Pekalongan	Pekalongan	Hoegeng Stadium
Persipa Pati	Pati Regency	Joyokusumo Stadium
Persipur Purwodadi	Grobogan Regency	Krida Bakti Stadium
Persis Solo	Surakarta	Manahan Stadium
Persitema Temanggung	Temanggung Regency	Bhumi Phala Stadium
Persiwi Wonogiri	Wonogiri Regency	Pringgondani Stadium
PPSM Magelang	Magelang	Moch. Soebroto Stadium
PSCS Cilacap	Cilacap Regency	Wijayakusuma Stadium
PSD Demak	Demak Regency	Pancasila Stadium
PSDB United	Demak Regency	Pancasila Stadium
PSIK Klaten	Klaten Regency	Trikoyo Stadium
PSIP Pemalang	Pemalang Regency	Mochtar Stadium
PSIR Rembang	Rembang Regency	Krida Stadium
PSIS Semarang	Semarang	Jatidiri Stadium
PSISa Salatiga	Salatiga	Kridanggo Satadium
PSISra Sragen	Sragen Regency	Taruna Stadium
PSIW Wonosobo	Wonosobo Regency	Kalianget Stadium
Putra Surakarta	Surakarta	Mini Surakarta Stadium
Safin Pati	Pati Regency	Gelora Soekarno Mojoagung Stadium
Satria Muda Ajibarang	Banyumas Regency	Wahyu Aji Ajibarang Stadium
Slawi United	Tegal Regency	Tri Sanja Stadium
Sragen United	Sragen Regency	Taruna Stadium
Universitas Surakarta	Surakarta	UNS Surakarta Stadium

=== Central Kalimantan ===
Club	Home city	Stadium
Barsel	South Barito Regency	Batuah Buntok Stadium
Borneo FIA	Palangka Raya	Tuah Pahoe Stadium
Jayakarsa	Palangka Raya	Tuah Pahoe Stadium
Isenmulang Kalteng	Palangka Raya	Tuah Pahoe Stadium
Kalteng Putra	Palangka Raya	Tuah Pahoe Stadium
Persebatam Batu Kotam	Lamandau Regency	Hinang Golloa Stadium
Persebun Pangkalan Bun	West Kotawaringin Regency	Sampuraga Stadium
Persegumas Gunung Mas	Gunung Mas Regency	Mini Kuala Kurun Stadium
Persekap Kapuas	Kapuas Regency	Panunjung Tarung Stadium
Persekat Katingan	Katingan Regency	Elang Sakti Jahanjang Stadium
Persela Lamandau	Lamandau Regency	Hinang Golloa Stadium
Persemas Jenamas	South Barito Regency	Batuah Buntok Stadium
Persemura Murung Raya	Murung Raya Regency	Willy M. Yoseph Stadium
Persera Seruyan	Seruyan Regency	Mini Gagah Lurus Stadium
Persesam Sampit	East Kotawaringin Regency	Gelora 29 November Stadium
Perssukma Sukamara	Sukamara Regency	Sukamara Football Field
Pulang Pisau United	Pulang Pisau Regency	H.M. Sanusi Stadium
PS Bartim	East Barito Regency	Patianom Stadium
PSBK Buntok	South Barito Regency	Batuah Buntok Stadium
PSMTW Muara Teweh	North Barito Regency	Swakarya Stadium
Sylva Kalteng	Palangka Raya	Tuah Pahoe Stadium

=== Central Papua ===
Club	Home city	Stadium
Dogiyai	Dogiyai Regency	Theo Makai Field
Nabire Putra	Nabire Regency	Batalyon 573/AVT Field
Persemi Mimika	Mimika Regency	Wania Imipi Stadium
Persidei Deiyai	Deiyai Regency	Thomas Adii Field
Persido Dogiyai	Dogiyai Regency	Theo Makai Field
Persinab Nabire	Nabire Regency	Batalyon 573/AVT Field
Persipani Paniai	Paniai Regency	Soeharto Field
Persipuja Puncak Jaya	Puncak Jaya Regency	GIDI Mulia Field
Persipuncak Puncak	Puncak Regency	Trikora Field
Persiyamo Puncak Jaya	Puncak Jaya Regency	Pemuda Sport Centre Field
PS Freeport Indonesia	Mimika Regency	Wania Imipi Stadium
Waanal Brothers	Mimika Regency	Wania Imipi Stadium

=== Central Sulawesi ===
Club	Home city	Stadium
Aditama Bahari	Palu	Galara Football Field
AKL 88	Palu	Faqih Rasyid Field
Bandar Sulteng	Donggala Regency	Persido Stadium
Binatama United	Palu	Faqih Rasyid Field
Buol United	Buol Regency	Kuonoto Stadium
Celebest	Palu	Gawalise Stadium
Donggala United	Donggala Regency	Persido Stadium
Galara Utama	Palu	Galara Football Field
Garda Justitia	Palu	Faqih Rasyid Field
Garuda Yaksa	Donggala Regency	Persido Stadium
Kramat Jaya	Palu	Gawalise Stadium
Palu Putra	Palu	Gawalise Stadium
Persbul Buol	Buol Regency	Kuonoto Stadium
Persema Mepanga	Parigi Moutong Regency	Gelora Mitra Kotaraya Stadium
Persibal Luwuk	Banggai Regency	Persibal Stadium
Persibang Banggai	Banggai Regency	Persibal Stadium
Persidapos Poso	Poso Regency	Puselemba Field
Persido Donggala	Donggala Regency	Persido Stadium
Persigatra Banggai	Banggai Regency	Sudarto Sport Center
Persigi Sigi	Sigi Regency	Mini Madani Stadium
Persikol Kolonodale	North Morowali Regency	Morokoa Field
Persipal Palu Junior	Palu	Gawalise Stadium
Persipar Parigi	Parigi Moutong Regency	Jonokalora Stadium
Persipera Banggai Islands	Banggai Islands Regency	Trikora Salakan Field
Persipos Poso	Poso Regency	Kasintuwu Stadium
Persittimo Tinombo Moutong	Parigi Moutong Regency	Gelora Samsurizal Tombolotutu Stadium
Persito Tolitoli	Tolitoli Regency	Nopi Stadium
Persito Tomini	Parigi Moutong Regency	Batu Raja Field
Persmo Moutong	Parigi Moutong Regency	Moutong Football Field
Pestu Tojo Una-Una	Tojo Una-Una Regency	Stamina Field
Poso	Poso Regency	Kasintuwu Stadium
Poso Energy	Poso Regency	Kasintuwu Stadium
PS Banggai Laut	Banggai Laut Regency	Labuan Kapelak Football Field
PS Berlian Tomoli	Parigi Moutong Regency	Tomoli Football Field
PS Bintang Timur Taipa	Palu	Labuan Beru Football Field
PS Kaleke Putra	Sigi Regency	Kaleke Football Field
PS Poso	Poso Regency	Kasintuwu Stadium
PS PUPR Bangkep	Banggai Islands Regency	Babasapan Tinangkung Field
PS Tisswan Labuan	Donggala Regency	Persido Stadium
PSNB Nupa Bomba	Donggala Regency	Persido Stadium
Rajawali United	Morowali Regency	Sapta Marga Wosu Field
Sahib Parimo	Parigi Moutong Regency	Patriot Bambalemo Field
Samudra Pantoloan	Palu	Samudra Pantoloan Field
Sinar Laut	Donggala Regency	Persido Stadium
SJS Luwuk	Banggai Regency	Persibal Stadium

=== East Java ===
Club	Home city	Stadium
AC Majapahit	Mojokerto Regency	Gajahmada Mojosari Stadium
Akor Jombang	Jombang Regency	Merdeka Stadium
Arek Suroboyo	Surabaya	Gelora 10 November Stadium
ArekMalang Indonesia	Malang	Gajayana Stadium
Arema	Malang Regency; Malang	Kanjuruhan Stadium; Gajayana Stadium
Arema Ngunut Academy	Tulungagung Regency	Pema Ngunut Stadium
ASIFA	Malang Regency	Mojolangu Field
Assyabaab Bangil	Pasuruan Regency	Pogar Bangil Stadium
Bajul Ijo	Surabaya	Gelora Bung Tomo Stadium
Baruna Nusantara	Banyuwangi Regency	Diponegoro Stadium
Blayu	Malang Regency	Blayu FC Football Field
Blitar Poetra	Blitar	Gelora Supriyadi Stadium
Bumi Wali	Tuban Regency	Loka Jaya Stadium
Bojonegoro	Bojonegoro Regency	Letjen Haji Sudirman Stadium
Cahaya Madura Muda	Pamekasan Regency	Gelora Madura Stadium
de Red	Surabaya	Gelora 10 November Stadium
Deltras	Sidoarjo Regency	Gelora Delta Stadium
Gen-B Mojokerto	Mojokerto Regency	Ahmad Yani Mojokerto Stadium
Gestra Paranane	Gresik Regency	Gelora Joko Samudro Stadium
Gresik United	Gresik Regency	Gelora Joko Samudro Stadium; Tri Dharma Stadium
Hizbul Wathan	Sidoarjo Regency	Gelora Delta Stadium
Inter Kediri	Kediri	Canda Bhirawa Stadium
Kanjuruhan	Malang Regency	Kanjuruhan Stadium
Kediri United	Kediri	Brawijaya Stadium
Lamongan	Lamongan Regency	Surajaya Stadium
Madiun Putra	Madiun	Wilis Stadium
Madura United	Bangkalan Regency; Pamekasan Regency	Gelora Bangkalan Stadium; Gelora Madura Ratu Pamelingan Stadium
Madura	Sumenep Regency	Ahmad Yani Stadium
Malang United	Malang	Gajayana Stadium
Mitra Surabaya	Surabaya	Gelora 10 November Stadium
Mojokerto	Mojokerto	Gajahmada Mojosari Stadium
Mojosari Putra	Mojokerto Regency	Gajahmada Mojosari Stadium
Naga Emas Asri	Tulungagung Regency	Rejoagung Stadium
Nganjuk Ladang	Nganjuk Regency	Anjukladang Stadium
Ngawi	Ngawi Regency	Ketonggo Stadium
Pamekasan Putra Tri Brata	Pamekasan Regency	Gelora Ratu Pamelingan Stadium
Pare	Kediri Regency	Canda Bhirawa Stadium
Pasuruan United	Pasuruan	Untung Suropati Stadium
Persatu Tuban	Tuban Regency	Bumi Wali Stadium
Perseba Bangkalan	Bangkalan Regency	Gelora Bangkalan Stadium
Persebaya Surabaya	Surabaya	Gelora Bung Tomo Stadium
Persebo 1964	Bondowoso Regency	Magenda Stadium
Persebo Putra	Bondowoso Regency	Magenda Stadium
Persedikab Kediri	Kediri Regency	Canda Bhirawa Stadium
Persekabpas Pasuruan	Pasuruan Regency	Pogar Bangil Stadium
Persekam Metro	Malang Regency	Kanjuruhan Stadium; Talok Stadium
Persekama Madiun	Madiun Regency	Pangeran Timoer Stadium
Persekap Pasuruan	Pasuruan	Untung Suropati Stadium
Persela Lamongan	Lamongan Regency	Surajaya Stadium
Persem Mojokerto	Mojokerto	Ahmad Yani Mojokerto Stadium
Persema Malang	Malang	Gajayana Stadium
Persemag Magetan	Magetan Regency	Yosonegoro Stadium
Persenga Nganjuk	Nganjuk Regency	Anjukladang Stadium
Persepam Madura Utama	Pamekasan Regency	Gelora Bangkalan Stadium
Persepon Ponorogo	Ponorogo Regency	Betara Katong Stadium
Persesa Sampang	Sampang Regency	Wijaya Kusuma Stadium
Perseta 1970	Tulungagung Regency	Rejoagung Stadium
Perseta Batara	Banyuwangi Regency	Guntur Wongsorejo Field
Persewangi Banyuwangi	Banyuwangi Regency	Diponegoro Stadium
Persibo Bojonegoro	Bojonegoro Regency	Letjen Haji Sudirman Stadium
Persid Jember	Jember Regency	Notohadinegoro Stadium
Persida Sidoarjo	Sidoarjo Regency	Gelora Delta Stadium
Persiga Trenggalek	Trenggalek Regency	Menak Sopal Stadium
Persik Kediri	Kediri	Brawijaya Stadium
Persikapro Probolinggo	Probolinggo Regency	Bayu Angga Stadium
Persikoba Batu	Batu	Brantas Stadium
Persinga Ngawi	Ngawi Regency	Ketonggo Stadium
Persipro 54	Probolinggo	Bayu Angga Stadium
Perspa Pacitan	Pacitan Regency	Gelora Pacitan Stadium
Perssu Madura City	Sumenep Regency	Ahmad Yani Stadium
PS Blitar Raya	Blitar	Gelora Supriyadi Stadium
PS Kota Pahlawan	Surabaya	Kodam V Brawijaya Field
PS Mojokerto Putra	Mojokerto Regency	Gajahmada Mojosari Stadium
PS Unmuh Jember	Jember	Muhammadiyah University of Jember Football Field
PSBI Blitar	Blitar Regency	Gelora Penataran Stadium
PSBK-PETA	Blitar	Gelora Supriyadi Stadium
PSHW Ponorogo	Ponorogo Regency	Betara Katong Stadium
PSID Jombang	Jombang	Merdeka Stadium
PSIL Lumajang	Lumajang Regency	Semeru Stadium
PSM Madiun	Madiun	Wilis Stadium
PSSS Situbondo	Situbondo	Abdurrahman Saleh Stadium
Putra Sang Fajar	Blitar	Gelora Supriyadi Stadium
RANS Nusantara	Batu	Brantas Stadium
Simo Putra	Pamekasan Regency	Gelora Madura Stadium
Sinar Harapan	Sidoarjo Regency	Gelora Delta Stadium
Surabaya Muda	Surabaya	Gelora 10 November Stadium
Suryanaga Connection	Surabaya	Gelora 10 November Stadium
Triple's Kediri	Kediri	Canda Bhirawa Stadium
UNESA	Surabaya	UNESA Football Field

=== East Kalimantan ===
Club	Home city	Stadium
ACN Muara Badak	Kutai Kartanegara Regency	Pertamina Hulu Sanga-Sanga Field
Balikpapan	Balikpapan	Sudirman Stadium
Balikpapan United	Balikpapan	Batakan Stadium
Berau	Berau Regency	Batiwakkal Field
Berau Marine	Berau Regency	Batiwakkal Field
Berau Saturut	Berau Regency	Batiwakkal Field
Bocah Liar	Samarinda	Sempaja Stadium
Bontang	Bontang	Mulawarman Stadium
Bontang City	Bontang	Taman Prestasi Stadium
Bontang Mitra United	Bontang	Mulawarman Stadium
Borneo Samarinda	Samarinda	Segiri Stadium
Gelora Pantai	Kutai Kartanegara Regency	Gelora Pantai Field
GMC Sportifitas	Samarinda	Sempaja Stadium
Harbi Putra	Samarinda	Segiri Stadium
Kartanegara	Kutai Kartanegara Regency	Rondong Demang Stadium
KSU Samarinda	Samarinda	Palaran Stadium
MSA Kutai Kartanegara	Kutai Kartanegara Regency	Pemuda Tenggarong Football Field
Nostalgia	Kutai Kartanegara Regency	Rondong Demang Stadium
Paser United	Paser Regency	Gentung Temiang KM 5 Stadium
Perselan Sanga-Sanga	Kutai Kartanegara Regency	Aji Imbut Stadium
Persiba Balikpapan	Balikpapan	Batakan Stadium
Persibon Bontang	Bontang	Mulawarman Stadium
Persikubar Putra	West Kutai Regency	Swalas Gunaaq Stadium
Persikukar Kutai Kartanegara	Kutai Kartanegara Regency	Rondong Demang Stadium
Persikutim United	East Kutai Regency	Kudungga Stadium
Persipas Paser	Paser Regency	Sadurengas Stadium
Persirau Berau	Berau Regency	Batiwakkal Field
Persisam United	Samarinda	Sempaja Stadium
PS Indominco Mandiri	Bontang	Bessai Berinta Stadium
PS Mahakam Ulu	Mahakam Ulu Regency	Ujoh Bilang Field
PS Mitra Kukar	Kutai Kartanegara Regency	Aji Imbut Stadium; Rondong Demang Stadium
PS Penajam Paser Utara	Penajam North Paser Regency	Nipah Nipah Stadium
PS Penajam Utama	Penajam North Paser Regency	Nipah Nipah Stadium
PS Putra Mahakam	Samarinda	Palaran Stadium
PS Setda Bontang	Bontang	Mulawarman Stadium
PSAD Kodam VI/Mulawarman	Balikpapan	Sudirman Stadium
PS PU Bontang	Bontang	Taman Prestasi Stadium
Sangkulirang	East Kutai Regency	Sangkulirang Football Field

=== East Nusa Tenggara ===
Club	Home city	Stadium
Bajak Laut	West Manggarai Regency	Ora Flobamorata Stadium
Bintang Timur Atambua	Belu Regency	Bintang Timur Football Field
Biru Muda Perkasa	East Flores Regency	Ile Mandiri Stadium
BMU Alor Pantar	Alor Regency	Batunirwala Stadium
Citra Bakti	Ngada Regency	Lebijaga Stadium
Flores United	Ende Regency	Marilonga Stadium
Kristal	Kupang	Oepoi Stadium
Nirwana 04	Nagekeo Regency	Wolosambi Field
Persab Belu	Belu Regency	Haliwen Stadium
Persada Southwest Sumba	Southwest Sumba Regency	Galatama Field
Persamba West Manggarai	West Manggarai Regency	Ora Flobamorata Stadium
Persami Maumere	Sikka Regency	Gelora Samador Stadium
Persap Alor Pantar	Alor Regency	Batunirwala Stadium
Persarai Sabu Raijua	Sabu Raijua Regency	Menia Football Field
Perse Ende	Ende Regency	Marilonga Stadium
Persebata Lembata	Lembata Regency	Gelora 99 Stadium
Persedaya Southwest Sumba	Southwest Sumba Regency	Galatama Field
Perseftim East Flores	East Flores Regency	Ile Mandiri Stadium
Persekota Koepang	Kupang	Oepoi Stadium
Persematim East Manggarai	East Manggarai Regency	Mukun Football Field
Persena Nagekeo	Nagekeo Regency	Wolosambi Field
Perserond Rote Ndao	Rote Ndao Regency	Christian Nehemia Dillak Stadium
Persesba West Sumba	West Sumba Regency	Mandaelu Stadium
Persewa Waingapu	East Sumba Regency	Koramil 1601 Field
Persim Manggarai	Manggarai Regency	Golo Dukal Stadium
Persisteng Central Sumba	Central Sumba Regency	Anakalang Field
Perss Soe	South Central Timor Regency	Kobelete Stadium
Platina	Kupang	Oepoi Stadium
Putera Oesao	Kupang Regency	Oesao Football Field
PS Malaka	Malaka Regency	Betun Field
PSK Kupang	Kupang Regency	Merdeka Stadium
PSKN Kefamenanu	North Central Timor Regency	Oemanu Field
PSN Ngada	Ngada Regency	Lebijaga Stadium
Tiara Nusa	East Manggarai Regency	Sere Field

=== Gorontalo ===
Club	Home city	Stadium
Abdi United	Bone Bolango Regency	Gelora 23 January Stadium
Basmi	Gorontalo Regency	Gelora 23 January Stadium
Bonebol	Bone Bolango Regency	Gelora Harapan Prestasi Stadium
Boliyohuto	Gorontalo Regency	Sidomulyo Field
Brigade Pesisir	Bone Bolango Regency	Gelora 23 January Stadium
Dengilo	Pohuwato Regency	Gelora Pohuwato Stadium
Dulamayo	Gorontalo Regency	Gelora 23 January Stadium
Dulupi	Boalemo Regency	Pemuda Stadium
FC Gorut	North Gorontalo Regency	Rajawali Tolinggula Stadium
Gorontalo United	Gorontalo City	Merdeka Stadium
IPPOT Tapa	Bone Bolango Regency	IPPOT Tapa Stadium
Kreasindo Rajawali Sultan	Gorontalo City	Merdeka Stadium
Lakeya	Gorontalo Regency	Gelora 23 January Stadium
Likot	Gorontalo Regency	Gelora 23 January Stadium
Mahardika	Boalemo Regency	Pemuda Stadium
Muara Tirta	Gorontalo City	Merdeka Stadium
Paguyaman All Star	Boalemo Regency	Pemuda Stadium
Paguyaman Pantai All Star	Boalemo Regency	Pemuda Stadium
Panipi Raya	Gorontalo Regency	Porbat Batudaa Field
Panua GFC	Pohuwato Regency	Tahele Field
Persidago Gorontalo	Gorontalo Regency	Gelora 23 January Stadium
Persikota Talaga	Gorontalo Regency	Gelora 23 January Stadium
Persital Talumolo	Gorontalo City	Talumolo Football Field
Popayato	Pohuwato Regency	Gelora Pohuwato Stadium
PS Bone Bolango	Bone Bolango Regency	Gelora Harapan Prestasi Stadium
PS Boalemo	Boalemo Regency	Pemuda Stadium
PS Gorontalo Utara	North Gorontalo Regency	Rajawali Tolinggula Stadium
PSP Pohuwato	Pohuwato Regency	Gelora Pohuwato Stadium
Sparadis United	Gorontalo Regency	Gelora 23 January Stadium
Telaga Biru	Gorontalo Regency	Gelora 23 January Stadium

=== Highland Papua ===
Club	Home city	Stadium
Bumi Baliem	Jayawijaya Regency	Pendidikan Stadium
Ketengban	Bintang Mountains Regency	Kabiding Football Field
Lapago	Jayawijaya Regency	Pendidikan Stadium
Mamteng	Central Mamberamo Regency	Ilugwa Football Field
Pamek	Bintang Mountains Regency	Kabiding Football Field
Persigubin Bintang Mountains	Bintang Mountains Regency	Kabiding Football Field
Persikimo Yahukimo	Yahukimo Regency	Dekai Football Field
Persilanny Lanny Jaya	Lanny Jaya Regency	Ampera Football Field
Persimamteng Central Mamberamo	Central Mamberamo Regency	Ilugwa Football Field
Persindug Nduga	Nduga Regency	Kenyam Field
Persiyali Yalimo	Yalimo Regency	Yalimo Football Field
Toli	Tolikara Regency	Merah Putih Football Field
Wamena United	Jayawijaya Regency	Pendidikan Stadium
Yahukimo	Yahukimo Regency	Dekai Football Field

=== Jakarta ===
Club	Home city	Stadium
ABC Wirayudha	East Jakarta	Gongseng Field
ASIOP	Central Jakarta	ASIOP Stadium
Batavia	South Jakarta	Soemantri Brodjonegoro Stadium
Bintang Kota	West Jakarta	RBC Batuceper Field
Betawi	South Jakarta	PTIK Stadium
Bintang Kranggan	East Jakarta	Bea Cukai Stadium
Bina Mutiara	East Jakarta	Arcici Sport Center
Jakarta City	North Jakarta	Kamal Muara Stadium
Jakarta Matador	South Jakarta	Nurhanudin Yonzikon 14/SWC Field
Jakarta United	East Jakarta	Soemantri Brodjonegoro Stadium
Jaksel	South Jakarta	PTIK Stadium
MC Utama	Central Jakarta	Arcici Sport Center
PS Pemuda Jaya	East Jakarta	GOR Pondok Bambu
Persija Barat	West Jakarta	Cendrawasih Stadium
Persija Jakarta	Jakarta	Gelora Bung Karno Stadium; Jakarta International Stadium
Persija Muda	Central Jakarta	Persija Pulomas Field
Persitara North Jakarta	North Jakarta	Kamal Muara Stadium; Tugu Stadium
PRO-Direct	South Jakarta	Soemantri Brodjonegoro Stadium
Taruma	East Jakarta	Bea Cukai Stadium
Taruna Persada	East Jakarta	Bea Cukai Stadium
Trisakti	West Jakarta	Trisakti Stadium
UMS 1905	West Jakarta	UMS Petak Sinkian Stadium
Urakan	East Jakarta	Gedong Soccer Field
Villa 2000 B	South Jakarta	Ciracas Stadium

=== Jambi ===
Club	Home city	Stadium
Batanghari	Batanghari Regency	KONI Batanghari Stadium
Bungo Putra	Bungo Regency	Serunai Baru Stadium
Dragon United	Jambi	Tri Lomba Juang Stadium
Jambi United	Jambi	Tri Lomba Juang Stadium
Merangin	Merangin Regency	Bumi Masurai Stadium
Patriot Bungo	Bungo Regency	Serunai Baru Stadium
Persebri Batanghari	Batanghari Regency	KONI Batanghari Stadium
Perselu Tungkal Ulu	West Tanjung Jabung Regency	Persitaj Stadium
Persibri Batanghari	Batanghari Regency	KONI Batanghari Stadium
Persijam Jambi	Jambi	Persijam Stadium
Persikasa Sarolangun	Sarolangun Regency	Sarolangun Emas Stadium
Persikoja Jambi	Jambi	Tri Lomba Juang Stadium
Persikota Sungai Penuh	Sungai Penuh	KONI Sungai Penuh Stadium
Persisko 1960	Merangin Regency	Bumi Masurai Stadium
Persitaj West Tanjung Jabung	West Tanjung Jabung Regency	Persitaj Stadium
PS Bungo	Bungo Regency	Serunai Baru Stadium
PS Indonesia Muda Jambi	Jambi	Tri Lomba Juang Stadium
PS Kerinci	Kerinci Regency	Mini Kerinci Stadium
PS Merangin	Merangin Regency	Bumi Masurai Stadium
PS Mosas Muara Sabak	East Tanjung Jabung Regency	Paduka Berhala Stadium
PS Muaro Jambi	Muaro Jambi Regency	Tri Lomba Juang Stadium
PS PLN Jambi	Jambi	Tri Lomba Juang Stadium
PS Sailun Salimbai	Muaro Jambi Regency	Tri Lomba Juang Stadium
PS Tebo	Tebo Regency	Tebo Regency Stadium
PS Tebo Bersatu	Tebo Regency	Tebo Regency Stadium
Siginjai Sakti	Jambi	Tri Lomba Juang Stadium
Tabir	Merangin Regency	Bumi Masurai Stadium

=== Lampung ===
Club	Home city	Stadium
Ababil United	East Lampung Regency	Nibung Waway Stadium
AD Sport	Bandar Lampung	Satlog Korem 043/Garuda Hitam Field
Bhayangkara Presisi	Bandar Lampung	Sumpah Pemuda Stadium
Bina Bangsa	Bandar Lampung	Sumpah Pemuda Stadium
Garuda Lampung City	South Lampung Regency	Way Handak Stadium
Garuda Mas Centra	Pringsewu Regency	Bandung Baru Stadium
Great Giant Food	Central Lampung Regency	Mini Panji Manunggal Stadium
Kresna	Metro	Tejosari Stadium
Krui	Pesisir Barat Regency	Bumi Sekala Bekhak Stadium
Lampung	Bandar Lampung	Pahoman Stadium
Lampung United	East Lampung Regency	Sumpah Pemuda Stadium
Persikomet Metro	Metro	Tejosari Stadium
Persilab West Lampung	West Lampung Regency	Bumi Sekala Bekhak Stadium
Persilas South Lampung	South Lampung Regency	Radin Inten Stadium
Persilat Central Lampung	Central Lampung Regency	Panca Krida Sendang Mukti Stadium
Persilamtim East Lampung	East Lampung Regency	Nibung Waway Stadium
Persilu North Lampung	North Lampung Regency	Sukung Kelapa Stadium
Persituba Tulang Bawang	Tulang Bawang Regency	Tiuh Tohou Stadium
Persiwaka Way Kanan	Way Kanan Regency	Sriwijaya Baradatu Field
Perspan Panjang	Bandar Lampung	Baruna Ria Field
Putra Baruna Panjang	Bandar Lampung	Pahoman Stadium
Putra Way Kanan	Way Kanan Regency	Sriwijaya Baradatu Field
Putrad PB	Central Lampung Regency	Panca Krida Sendang Mukti Stadium
PS Putra Jaya	East Lampung Regency	Mini Nibung Stadium
PS Tanggamus	Tanggamus Regency	Tangsi Talangpadang Field
PS Way Kanan	Way Kanan Regency	Sriwijaya Baradatu Field
PSBL Bandar Lampung	Bandar Lampung	Pahoman Stadium
SS Lampung	Bandar Lampung	Sumpah Pemuda Stadium
Tanggamus Farmers	Tanggamus Regency	Tangsi Talangpadang Field
Trisula	East Lampung Regency	Sukadana Stadium
TS Saiburai	Bandar Lampung	Harnas Village Field

=== Maluku ===
Club	Home city	Stadium
Ambon Putra	Ambon	Mandala Remaja Stadium
Ambon United	Ambon	Mandala Remaja Stadium
Binatama Bupolo	Buru Regency	Manatahan Debowae Stadium
Dolorosa	Southeast Maluku Regency	Maren Stadium
Gemba	West Seram Regency	Kusuma Tani Stadium
Halawang	Central Maluku Regency	Uli Halawang Football Field
Hila Putra	Central Maluku Regency	Uli Halawang Football Field
Jong Ambon	Ambon	Mandala Remaja Stadium
Lima Jaya	Central Maluku Regency	Tanjung Tuhal Stadium
Maluku	Ambon	Mandala Remaja Stadium
Maluku United	Ambon	Mandala Remaja Stadium
Nusaina	Central Maluku Regency	Matawaru Field
Nusantara Masohi	Central Maluku Regency	Polres Masohi Football Field
Olilit Putra	Tanimbar Islands Regency	Mandwriak Field
Persemalra Southeast Maluku	Southeast Maluku Regency	Maren Stadium
Persilaki Saumlaki	Tanimbar Islands Regency	Mandwriak Field
Persmi Masohi	Central Maluku Regency	Polres Masohi Football Field
Persinam Namlea	Buru Regency	Mandala Field
Persita Laha	Ambon	Laha Football Field
PS Geser	East Seram Regency	Pancasila Field
PS Hatusela Mamala	Central Maluku Regency	Mini Hatusela Stadium
PS Iha Kulur Putra	West Seram Regency	Kumbang Amalatu Field
PS Louruhu	Central Maluku Regency	Matasili Football Field
PS MBD Jaya	Southwest Maluku Regency	Kalwedo Field
PS Pelauw Putra	Central Maluku Regency	Sibinuang Field
PSA Ambon	Ambon	Mandala Remaja Stadium
PSHL Hitu Leitimur	Central Maluku Regency	Mandala Remaja Stadium
PSPA Aru Islands	Aru Islands Regency	Yos Sudarso Field
PSST East Seram	East Seram Regency	Pancasila Field
Sinar Victoria Kataloka	East Seram Regency	Pancasila Field
Siwalima	Ambon	Mandala Remaja Stadium
Tulehu Putra	Central Maluku Regency	Matawaru Field
Tulehu United	Central Maluku Regency	Matawaru Field
Wainuru	Central Maluku Regency	Liang Football Field

=== North Kalimantan ===
Club	Home city	Stadium
Kaltara	Tarakan	Datu Adil Stadium
Persemal Malinau	Malinau Regency	Malinau Main Stadium
Persibul Bulungan	Bulungan Regency	Andi Tjatjok Stadium
Persibun Bunyu	Bulungan Regency	Bunyu Stadium
PS Gemilang Sakti	Tarakan	Datu Adil Stadium
PS Pelangi Utara Malinau	Malinau Regency	Malinau Main Stadium
PS Sebatik	Nunukan Regency	Sungai Bilah Stadium
PSN Nunukan	Nunukan Regency	Sungai Bilah Stadium
PSTK Tarakan	Tarakan	Datu Adil Stadium

=== North Maluku ===
Club	Home city	Stadium
Morotai United	Morotai Regency	Gelora Merah Putih Stadium
Persambong Sula	Sula Islands Regency	Romba Ewang Field
Persega Galela	North Halmahera Regency	Rajawali Football Stadium
Persibu Ibu	West Halmahera Regency	Togulu Malamo Stadium
Persihalbar West Halmahera	West Halmahera Regency	Banau Stadium
Persihalsel South Halmahera	South Halmahera Regency	Gelora Bahrain Kasuba Stadium
Persihalteng Central Halmahera	Central Halmahera Regency	Delek Waibulen Stadium
Persihaltim East Halmahera	East Halmahera Regency	Jiko Mobon Stadium
Persihalut North Halmahera	North Halmahera Regency	Djordan Kusame Stadium
Persis Soasio	Tidore	Marimoi Stadium
Persisofi Sofifi	Sofifi	Sofifi Football Field
Persetob Tobelo	North Halmahera Regency	Djordan Kusame Stadium
Persikota Tidore	Tidore	Gelora Nuku Stadium
Persila Sula Islands	Sula Islands Regency	Romba Ewang Field
Persiter Ternate	Ternate	Gelora Kie Raha Stadium
PS Banteng Santiong	Ternate	Gelora Kie Raha Stadium

=== North Sulawesi ===
Club	Home city	Stadium
Bhayangkara Polda Sulut	Manado	Klabat Stadium
Bina Taruna	Manado	Klabat Stadium
Bintang Muda Matali	Kotamobagu	Nunuk Matali Stadium
Bolsel	South Bolaang Mongondow Regency	Gema 45 Linawan Field
Boltim	East Bolaang Mongondow Regency	Gogaluman Field
Panzer Pegadaian	Manado	Klabat Stadium
Persbit Bitung	Bitung	Duasudara Stadium
Persibolmut North Bolaang Mongondow	North Bolaang Mongondow Regency	Inomasa Field
Persibom Bolaang Mongondow	Bolaang Mongondow Regency	Ambang Stadium
Persikokot Kotamobagu	Kotamobagu	Nunuk Matali Stadium
Persis Sangihe	Sangihe Islands Regency	Gesit Tahuna Field
Persital Talaud	Talaud Islands Regency	Talaud Stadium
Persitaro Siau Tagulandang Biaro	Siau Tagulandang Biaro Islands Regency	Batahi Ondong Field
Persma Manado	Manado	Klabat Stadium
Persmin Minahasa	Minahasa Regency	Maesa Stadium
Persminut North Minahasa	North Minahasa Regency	Waraney Warukapas Field
Persminsel South Minahasa	South Minahasa Regency	Kawangkoan Stadium
Persmitra Southeast Minahasa	Southeast Minahasa Regency	Kawangkoan Stadium
Puma	Sangihe Islands Regency	Gesit Tahuna Field
PS Klabat Jaya Sakti	Manado	Klabat Stadium
PS Kuda Laut Belang	Southeast Minahasa Regency	Kawangkoan Stadium
PS Manado	Manado	Klabat Stadium
PS Mandiri	Manado	Klabat Stadium
PSMU North Minahasa	North Minahasa Regency	Waraney Warukapas Field
PSKT Tomohon	Tomohon	Parasamya Walian Stadium
Rotasi Putra	Kotamobagu	Nunuk Matali Stadium
Tahuna	Sangihe Islands Regency	Gesit Tahuna Field
Ulul Albab	Bolaang Mongondow Regency	Ambang Stadium
Sulut	Manado	Klabat Stadium
Sulut United	Manado	Klabat Stadium
Tomohon United	Tomohon	Parasamya Walian Stadium

=== North Sumatra ===
Club	Home city	Stadium
Agtagana	Serdang Bedagai Regency	Gunung Pamela Stadium
Bansar	Langkat Regency	Kebun Bunga Stadium
Batak United	North Tapanuli Regency	Mini Tarutung Stadium
Batubara Bisa	Batubara Regency	Dolok Pop Limapuluh Field
Batubara United	Batubara Regency	Inalum Main Stadium
Binjai City	Binjai	Binjai Stadium
Binjai United	Binjai	Binjai Stadium
Brimo Langkat	Langkat Regency	Nurcahya Stadium
Deli Serdang United	Deli Serdang Regency	Baharuddin Siregar Stadium
Gumarang	Medan	Teladan Stadium
Gunungsitoli Khoda	Gunungsitoli	Pelita Field
Labura Hebat	North Labuhanbatu Regency	Porku Stadium
Medan Jaya	Mandailing Natal Regency	Madina Stadium
Mandailing Raya	Mandailing Natal Regency	Madina Stadium
Medan United	Medan	Teladan Stadium
Medan Utama	Medan	Teladan Stadium
Muspika	Deli Serdang Regency	Baharuddin Siregar Stadium
Patriot Medan	Medan	Teladan Stadium
Pelita Medan Soccer	Medan	Teladan Stadium
Persebsi Sibolga	Sibolga	Horas Stadium
Persesi Siantar	Pematangsiantar	Sangnawaluh Stadium
Persitas South Tapanuli	South Tapanuli Regency	Balakka Janggut Stadium
Perstas Batubara	Batubara Regency	Labuhan Ruku Field
Perstobasa Toba Samosir	Toba Regency	Sisingamangaraja XII Stadium
Perstu North Tapanuli	North Tapanuli Regency	Siborongborong Stadium
Poslab Labuhanbatu	Labuhanbatu Regency	Binaraga Stadium
Putra Simalungun Nusantara	Simalungun Regency	Gelora Rinjowan Stadium
PS Batubara	Batubara Regency	Inalum Main Stadium
PS Bhinneka	Deli Serdang Regency	Baharuddin Siregar Stadium
PS Gunungsitoli	Gunungsitoli	Pelita Field
PS Harjuna Putra	Deli Serdang Regency	Kayu Besar PS V Klumpang Field
PS Humbahas	Humbang Hasundutan Regency	Simangaronsang Stadium
PS Keluarga USU	Medan	Mini USU Stadium
PS Kwarta	Deli Serdang Regency	Baharuddin Siregar Stadium
PS Labura Jaya	North Labuhanbatu Regency	Porku Stadium
PS Labusel	South Labuhanbatu Regency	SBBK Field
PS Madina Jaya	Mandailing Natal Regency	Madina Stadium
PS Mitra Asahan	Asahan Regency	Mutiara Kisaran Stadium
PS Pakpak Bharat	Pakpak Bharat Regency	Napasengkut Field
PS Palas	Padang Lawas Regency	Aek Litta Football Field
PS Paluta	North Padang Lawas Regency	GOR Paluta Stadium
PS Paya Bakung United	Deli Serdang Regency	Paya Bakung Field
PS PTPN III	Labuhanbatu Regency	Janji Kebun Field
PS Samosir	Samosir Regency	Mogang Palipi Stadium
PS Satria Muda	Serdang Bedagai Regency	Pegajahan Field
PS Sergai	Serdang Bedagai Regency	Naga Sakti Stadium
PS Taruna Satria	Tebingtinggi	Kampung Durian Stadium
PS Tasbi	Medan	Jalur Hijau Tasbi Field
PS Toba	Toba Regency	Sisingamangaraja XII Stadium
PS Trimantra Esa	Medan	Teladan Stadium
PSDS Deli Serdang	Deli Serdang Regency	Baharuddin Siregar Stadium
PS TGM Medan	Medan	Teladan Stadium
PSG Simalungun	Simalungun Regency	Gelora Rinjowan Stadium
PSKB Binjai	Binjai	Binjai Stadium
PSKTS Tebingtinggi	Tebingtinggi	Kampung Durian Stadium
PSKPS Padangsidimpuan	Padangsidimpuan	Naposo Stadium
PSL Langkat	Langkat Regency	Pertamina Stadium
PSMS Medan	Medan	Teladan Stadium
PSN Nias	Nias Regency	Tetehosi Stadium
PSS Simalungun	Simalungun Regency	Gelora Rinjowan Stadium
PSSA Asahan	Asahan Regency	Mutiara Kisaran Stadium
PSSD Dairi	Dairi Regency	Panji Bako Stadium
PSSK Karo	Karo Regency	Samura Stadium
PSTS Tanjungbalai	Tanjungbalai	Asahan Sakti Stadium
PSTT Central Tapanuli	Central Tapanuli Regency	GOR Pandan Stadium
Ratu	Deli Serdang Regency	Baharuddin Siregar Stadium
RBS Padangsidimpuan	Padangsidimpuan	Naposo Stadium
Saba Bangunan United	Padang Lawas Regency	Aek Litta Football Field
Sidikalang	Dairi Regency	Panji Bako Stadium
Tanjungbalai United	Tanjungbalai	Asahan Sakti Stadium
Tapanuli Atletik	North Tapanuli Regency	Serbaguna Stadium
Tobasa	Toba Regency	Sisingamangaraja XII Stadium
Victory Dairi	Dairi Regency	Panji Bako Stadium
YOB Belawan	Medan	Teladan Stadium

=== Papua ===
Club	Home city	Stadium
Biak United	Biak Numfor Regency	Cendrawasih Stadium
Eleven Wise	Biak Numfor Regency	Cendrawasih Stadium
Emsyk	Jayapura City	Barnabas Youwe Stadium
Mamberamo United	Mamberamo Raya Regency	Kasonaweja Field
Nafri	Jayapura City	Mandala Stadium
Persemar Mamberamo Raya	Mamberamo Raya Regency	Kasonaweja Field
Persewar Waropen	Waropen Regency	Gelora Waropen Stadium
Persidafon Dafonsoro	Jayapura Regency	Barnabas Youwe Stadium
Persiker Keerom	Keerom Regency	Swakarsa Mini Stadium
Persimi Sarmi	Sarmi Regency	Merdeka Sarmi Field
Persiori Supiori	Supiori Regency	Cendrawasih Stadium
Persipura Jayapura	Jayapura City	Mandala Stadium
Persiweja Kasonaweja	Mamberamo Raya Regency	Kasonaweja Field
PS Elang Brimob	Jayapura City	Mandala Stadium
PS Embun Supiori	Supiori Regency	Cendrawasih Stadium
PSBS Biak	Biak Numfor Regency	Cendrawasih Stadium
Sarmi	Sarmi Regency	Merdeka Sarmi Field
Waribo	Mamberamo Raya Regency	Kasonaweja Field

=== Riau ===
Club	Home city	Stadium
Aufia	Pekanbaru	Kaharudin Nasution Stadium
Bagansiapiapi	Rokan Hilir Regency	Batu 4 Bagansiapiapi Stadium
Gempuri	Indragiri Hulu Regency	Narasinga Stadium
Gunung Sari	Kampar Regency	Tuanku Tambusai Stadium
KS Tiga Naga	Kampar Regency	Tuanku Tambusai Stadium
Nabil	Pelalawan Regency	Mini Datuk Incin Sekijang Stadium
Nusa Indah Permai	Indragiri Hilir Regency	Beringin Stadium
Pekanbaru	Pekanbaru	Kaharudin Nasution Stadium
Pekanbaru United	Pekanbaru	Kaharudin Nasution Stadium
Pekanbaru Warriors	Pekanbaru	Kaharudin Nasution Stadium
Pelalawan United	Pelalawan Regency	Mini Datuk Incin Sekijang Stadium
Pendalian	Rokan Hulu Regency	Mini Ujungbatu Stadium
Perfisi FISIP UR	Pekanbaru	Mini Universitas Riau Stadium
Persemai Dumai	Dumai	Bukit Jin Stadium
Persih Tembilahan	Indragiri Hilir Regency	Beringin Stadium
Persikalis Bengkalis	Bengkalis Regency	Muhammad Ali Stadium
Persiks Kuantan Singingi	Kuantan Singingi Regency	Kuansing Stadium
Persires Indragiri Hulu	Indragiri Hulu Regency	Narasinga Stadium
PS Duri	Bengkalis Regency	Pokok Jengkol Mini Stadium
PS Meranti	Meranti Islands Regency	Mahmud Jalal Stadium
PS Pelalawan	Pelalawan Regency	Mini Datuk Incin Sekijang Stadium
PS Petalangan	Pelalawan Regency	Mini Datuk Incin Sekijang Stadium
PS Siak	Siak Regency	Kampung Rempak Stadium
PSBS Bangkinang	Kampar Regency	Tuanku Tambusai Stadium
PSPS Pekanbaru	Pekanbaru	Riau Main Stadium
PSSP Selat Panjang	Meranti Islands Regency	Mahmud Jalal Stadium
Riau Berjaya	Pekanbaru	Kaharudin Nasution Stadium
Riau United	Pekanbaru	Kaharudin Nasution Stadium
Rumbai	Pekanbaru	Da'wah Rumbai Field
Teacher United Indonesia	Pekanbaru	Kaharudin Nasution Stadium
UNRI	Pekanbaru	Mini Universitas Riau Stadium
Wahana	Pekanbaru	Wahana Football Field

=== Riau Islands ===
Club	Home city	Stadium
757 Kepri Jaya	Batam	Gelora Citramas Stadium
Bintan Muda	Bintan Regency	Demang Lebar Daun Stadium
Biram Dewa	Tanjungpinang	Sri Tribuana Dompak Stadium
DY Batam	Batam	Tumenggung Abdul Jamal Stadium
MBS United	Batam	Gelora Citramas Stadium
Nanzaby Family	Tanjungpinang	Sri Tribuana Dompak Stadium
Persedas Dabo Singkep	Lingga Regency	Said Abdul Djalil Stadium
PS Anambas	Anambas Islands Regency	Rintis Football Field
PS Batam	Batam	Tumenggung Abdul Jamal Stadium
PS Bintan	Bintan Regency	Demang Lebar Daun Stadium
PS BP Batam	Batam	Tumenggung Abdul Jamal Stadium
PS Lingga	Lingga Regency	Said Abdul Djalil Stadium
PS Karimun	Karimun Regency	Badang Perkasa Stadium
PS Putra Kundur	Karimun Regency	Badang Perkasa Stadium
PS Shark Tanjungpinang	Tanjungpinang	Antam Kijang Stadium
PSTK Tanjungpinang	Tanjungpinang	Sulaiman Abdullah Stadium
PSTS Tanjungpinang	Tanjungpinang	Sulaiman Abdullah Stadium
PSPN Natuna	Natuna Regency	Seluan Stadium

=== Southeast Sulawesi ===
Club	Home city	Stadium
Amesiu United	Konawe Regency	Duriasri Stadium
Buteng United	Central Buton Regency	Lamoliandu Stadium
Gasko Kolaka	Kolaka Regency	Gelora Kolaka Stadium
Gevira	Kendari	Lakidende Stadium
Gulamastar	Central Buton Regency	Lamoliandu Stadium
Kendari United	Kendari	Lakidende Stadium
LDM Budi Luhur	Wakatobi Regency	Lakidende Stadium
Persimubar West Muna	West Muna Regency	Mekar Jaya Field
Persibau Baubau	Baubau	Betoambari Stadium
PS Buton Selatan	South Buton Regency	Sadar Sampolawa Field
PS Buton Utara	North Buton Regency	Lamoliandu Stadium
PS Dafi Mulia	South Konawe Regency	Konggoasa Stadium
PS Kendari	Kendari	Lakidende Stadium
PS Kolaka	Kolaka Regency	ANTAM Football Stadium
PS Konut Putra	North Konawe Regency	Konggoasa Stadium
PS Morosi Utama	Konawe Regency	Duriasri Stadium
PS Muna Barat	West Muna Regency	Mekar Jaya Field
PS Padangguni	Konawe Regency	Padangguni Football Field
PS Satria Wakumoro	Muna Regency	Manguntara Wakuru Field
PS Tongkuno Raya	Muna Regency	Walengkabola Football Field
PS Wakatobi	Wakatobi Regency	Lakidende Stadium
PS Wonua Bombana	Bombana Regency	Maesalaro Stadium
PSW Wolio	Baubau	Betoambari Stadium
Selaras	North Konawe Regency	Endoasa Football Field
Tiger Sultra	Kendari	Lakidende Stadium
Tri Elang United	Kolaka Regency	Gelora Kolaka Stadium
Wawonii Putra	Konawe Islands Regency	Konawe Selatan Main Stadium
Unaaha	Kendari	Lakidende Stadium
UHO MZF	Kendari	UHO Mini Stadium

=== Southwest Papua ===
Club	Home city	Stadium
Bola Mania	Sorong	Bawela Stadium
Nogari Rekub Dum	Sorong	Doom Football Field
Persemay Maybrat	Maybrat Regency	Ella Football Field
Persikos Sorong	Sorong	Bawela Stadium
Persisos South Sorong	South Sorong Regency	Trinati Stadium
Persiss Sorong	Sorong Regency	Wombik Stadium
Persitam Tambrauw	Tambrauw Regency	Kwoka Field
PS Getsemani	Sorong	Bawela Stadium
PS Putra Doom	Sorong	Doom Football Field
PS Sekda Maybrat	Maybrat Regency	Ella Football Field
PS Unimuda Sorong	Sorong	Bawela Stadium
Raja Ampat United	Raja Ampat Regency	Klanafat Stadium

=== South Kalimantan ===
Club	Home city	Stadium
Banjar Union	Banjar Regency	RB Tambak Anyar Field
Barabai	Central Hulu Sungai Regency	Murakata Stadium
Barito Putera	Banjarmasin and Banjar Regency	17th May Stadium; Demang Lehman Stadium
Batulicin Putra 69	Tanah Bumbu Regency	Batulicin Stadium
Carsurin	Banjarmasin	17th May Stadium
Gasib Barabai	Central Hulu Sungai Regency	Murakata Stadium
Kotabaru	Kotabaru Regency	Bamega Stadium
Perseam Amuntai	North Hulu Sungai Regency	Karias Stadium
Peseban Banjarmasin	Banjarmasin	17th May Stadium
Persebaru Banjarbaru	Banjarbaru	Demang Lehman Stadium
Persehan Marabahan	Barito Kuala Regency	17th May Stadium
Perseka Kandangan	South Hulu Sungai Regency	Ganda Football Stadium
Persekaban Banjar	Banjar Regency	Demang Lehman Stadium
Persemar Martapura	Banjar Regency	Demang Lehman Stadium
Persenus Nusantara	Banjarmasin	Green Yakin Soccer Field
Persepan Pagatan	Tanah Bumbu Regency	7th February Pagatan Stadium
Perseran Rantau	Tapin Regency	Datu Muning Stadium
Persetab Tabalong	Tabalong Regency	Pembataan Stadium
Persetala Tanah Laut	Tanah Laut Regency	Pertasi Stadium
Persiko Kotabaru	Kotabaru Regency	Bamega Stadium
Persitam Tamban	Barito Kuala Regency	17th May Stadium
PS Balangan	Balangan Regency	Martasura Field
PS Gunung Sambung Putra	Banjar Regency	Demang Lehman Stadium
PS Kab. Tapin	Tapin Regency	Balipat Stadium
PS Talenta Banua	Banjar Regency	Demang Lehman Stadium
Putra Plaosan Martapura	Banjar Regency	Demang Lehman Stadium

=== South Papua ===
Club	Home city	Stadium
Asmat	Asmat Regency	Yos Sudarso Field
Bevak Roman's	Merauke Regency	Katalpal Stadium
Golden	Merauke Regency	Katalpal Stadium
Merauke Putra	Merauke Regency	Mini Maro Stadium
Persias Asmat	Asmat Regency	Yos Sudarso Field
Persibodi Boven Digoel	Boven Digoel Regency	Asiki Football Field
Persimap Mappi	Mappi Regency	Mappi Sport Center
Persimer Merauke	Merauke Regency	Katalpal Stadium
PS Noterdam	Merauke Regency	Katalpal Stadium

=== South Sulawesi ===
Club	Home city	Stadium
Bank Sulselbar	Makassar	Karebosi Field
Gasiba Bulukumba	Bulukumba Regency	Mini Bulukumba Stadium
Gasbar Barru	Barru Regency	Sumpang Binangae Stadium
Gasis Soppeng	Soppeng Regency	Haji Andi Wana Stadium
Gaslut North Luwu	North Luwu Regency	Pandak Field
Gasma Enrekang	Enrekang Regency	Bumi Massenrempulu Stadium
Gaspa 1958	Palopo	Lagaligo Stadium
Gasta Takalar	Takalar Regency	Ranggong Daeng Romo Stadium
Gastor Tana Toraja	Tana Toraja Regency	Ulusalu Field
Gaswa Wajo	Wajo Regency	Andi Ninnong Stadium
Gowa United	Gowa Regency	Kalegowa Stadium
Kasiwa	Makassar	Telkom Makassar Football Field
Luwu Raya United	Palopo	Lagaligo Stadium
Makassar City	Makassar	Telkom Makassar Football Field
Mangiwang	Makassar	Bosowa Sport Center Field
Masolo United	Pinrang Regency	Teppo Patampanua Field
MRC Bulukumba	Bulukumba Regency	Mini Bulukumba Stadium
Palopo United	Palopo	Lagaligo Stadium
Perseka Bosowa	Makassar	Bosowa Sport Center
Persesos Sorowako	East Luwu Regency	Persesos Sorowako Stadium
Persiban Bantaeng	Bantaeng Regency	Mini Lamalaka Stadium
Persibone Bone	Bone Regency	La Patau Stadium
Persigowa Gowa	Gowa Regency	Kalegowa Stadium
Persijo Jeneponto	Jeneponto Regency	Mini Turatea Stadium
Persim Maros	Maros Regency	Kassi Kebo Stadium
Persipangkep Pangkajene and Islands	Pangkajene Islands Regency	Andi Mappe Stadium
Persipare Parepare	Parepare	Gelora B.J. Habibie Stadium
Perslutim East Luwu	East Luwu Regency	Andi Hasan Opu To Hatta Stadium
Perspin Pinrang	Pinrang Regency	Bau Massepe Stadium
Perssin Sinjai	Sinjai Regency	Andi Bintang Stadium
PS Bangau Putra	Makassar	Karebosi Field
PS Luwu	Luwu Regency	Andi Djemma Stadium
PS Nene Mallomo	Sidenreng Rappang Regency	Ganggawa Stadium
PS Toraja Utara	North Toraja Regency	Kodim 1414 Rantepao Field
PSM Makassar	Makassar	Andi Mattalatta Stadium; Barombong Stadium
PSSK Selayar	Selayar Islands Regency	Pemuda Benteng Field
Rajawali Muda	Makassar	Barombong Stadium
QDR	Makassar	Kavaleri Field
Sultan Jaya	Makassar	Gelora Sultan Hasanuddin Field

=== South Sumatra ===
Club	Home city	Stadium
Arsenio Arkan	Palembang	Bumi Sriwijaya Stadium
Bhayangkara Sriwijaya	Palembang	Wira Bhakti Stadium
David Palembang	Palembang	Putra Jaya Pertamina Stadium
Ex-Simbels Hastiguna	Palembang	Gelora Sriwijaya Stadium
KMP Bumara	Palembang	Bumi Sriwijaya Stadium
MCF United	Musi Banyuasin Regency	Serasan Sekate Stadium
Muara Enim Serasan	Muara Enim Regency	Sekundang Bara Stadium
Palembang Sportivo	Palembang	Gelora Sriwijaya Stadium
Persegrata Palembang	Palembang	Bumi Sriwijaya Stadium
Persibaja Baturaja	Ogan Komering Ulu Regency	Madya Kemiling Stadium
Persila Lahat	Lahat Regency	Gelora Serame Stadium
Persime Muara Enim	Muara Enim Regency	Sekundang Bara Stadium
Persimuba Musi Banyuasin	Musi Banyuasin Regency	Serasan Sekate Stadium
Persimura Musi Rawas	Musi Rawas Regency	Petanang Stadium
Persipra Prabumulih	Prabumulih	Talang Jimar Stadium
Persoki Ogan Komering Ilir	Ogan Komering Ilir Regency	Segi Tiga Emas Stadium
PS Banyuasin	Banyuasin Regency	Ir. Poerdjianto Stadium
PS Bank Sumsel	Palembang	Bumi Sriwijaya Stadium
PS Lubuklinggau	Lubuklinggau	Bumi Silampari Stadium
PS Ogan Ilir	Ogan Ilir Regency	Universitas Sriwijaya Stadium
PS OKU Selatan	South Ogan Komering Ulu Regency	Madya Kemiling Stadium
PersiOKUT East Ogan Komering Ulu	East Ogan Komering Ulu Regency	Tebat Sari Stadium
Porsiba Bukit Asam	Muara Enim Regency	Saringan Football Field
PS Pagar Alam	Pagar Alam	Sekundang Bara Main Stadium
PS Palembang	Palembang	Bumi Sriwijaya Stadium
PS Pama	Muara Enim Regency	Sekundang Bara Main Stadium
PS Satria Muda	Musi Rawas Regency	Petanang Stadium
PSAD Kodam II/Sriwijaya	Palembang	Bumi Sriwijaya Stadium
PSSL Bayung Lencir	Musi Banyuasin Regency	Serasan Sekate Stadium
Sriwijaya	Palembang	Gelora Sriwijaya Stadium
Sumsel United	Palembang	Bumi Sriwijaya Stadium

=== Special Region of Yogyakarta ===
Club	Home city	Stadium
Bantul United	Bantul Regency	Sultan Agung Stadium
Duta Pro Bina Taruna KCM	Bantul Regency	Sultan Agung Stadium
Gadjah Mada	Yogyakarta	Mandala Krida Stadium
Gukiti	Gunungkidul Regency	Gelora Handayani Stadium
Indonesia Muda Naturindo	Yogyakarta	Mandala Krida Stadium
JK Tamanan United	Bantul Regency	Sultan Agung Stadium
Jogja Istimewa Football	Yogyakarta	Mandala Krida Stadium
Mataram Utama Manggala	Yogyakarta	Mandala Krida Stadium
Persiba Bantul	Bantul Regency	Sultan Agung Stadium
Persig Gunungkidul	Gunungkidul Regency	Gelora Handayani Stadium
Persikup Kulon Progo	Kulon Progo Regency	Cangkring Stadium
PS Baturetno	Bantul Regency	Sultan Agung Stadium
PS HW UMY	Bantul Regency	UMY Football Field
PS Protaba Bantul	Bantul Regency	Sultan Agung Stadium
PSIM Yogyakarta	Yogyakarta	Mandala Krida Stadium
PSS Sleman	Sleman Regency	Maguwoharjo Stadium
PSTN Tunas Ngaglik	Sleman Regency	Maguwoharjo Stadium
Raga Putra Menoreh	Kulon Progo Regency	Cangkring Stadium
Rajawali Gunungkidul	Gunungkidul Regency	Gelora Handayani Stadium
Satria Adikarta	Kulon Progo Regency	Cangkring Stadium
Sleman United	Sleman	Maguwoharjo Stadium
Tunas Jogja	Yogyakarta	Mandala Krida Stadium
UAD Yogyakarta	Yogyakarta	Mandala Krida Stadium
UNY Yogyakarta	Yogyakarta	Mandala Krida Stadium

=== West Java ===
Club	Home city	Stadium
Adhyaksa Bekasi	Bekasi	Patriot Chandrabhaga Stadium
Al Jabbar	Cirebon Regency	Bima Stadium
ASAD Purwakarta	Purwakarta Regency	Purnawarman Stadium
Bandung Barat United	West Bandung Regency	Abripaya Rende Stadium
Bandung Legend	Bandung	Siliwangi Stadium
Bandung Timur	Bandung Regency	Sabilulungan Field
Bandung United	Bandung	Siliwangi Stadium
Banjar Patroman	Banjar	Gelora Banjar Patroman Stadium
Bekasi United	Bekasi Regency	Wibawa Mukti Stadium
Benpica	Karawang Regency	Mini Anda S. Dipura Stadium
Bina Putra Sentra	Cirebon Regency	Bima Stadium
Blasters GMC	Karawang Regency	Mini Anda S. Dipura Stadium
Buaran Putra	Bekasi	Buaran Putra Field
Bojonggede Raya	Bogor Regency	Prakas Field
BRT Subang	Subang Regency	Persikas Stadium
Cibinong Poetra	Bogor Regency	Mini Citra Buana Stadium
Cirebon Barat	Cirebon Regency	Ranggajati Stadium
Cirebon United	Cirebon	Bima Stadium
Citeureup Raya	Bogor Regency	Hambalang Mini Stadium
Depok	Depok	Merpati Stadium
Depok City	Depok	Merpati Stadium
Depok Raya	Depok	Mahakam Stadium
Depok United	Depok	Mahakam Stadium
EASGA	Kuningan Regency	Mashud Wisnusaputra Stadium
Ebod Jaya	Cimahi	Pusdikjas AD Cimahi Filed
Fanshop FA	Bandung	Siliwangi Stadium
Gapura	Bogor Regency	Parung Panjang Field
Garudayaksa	Bogor Regency	Pakansari Stadium
Galuh	Ciamis Regency	Galuh Stadium
Gemilang Raya	Kuningan Regency	Karyawisesa Field
Indramayu United	Indramayu Regency	Tridaya Stadium
Inspire Indonesia	Bandung Regency	Tegallega Field
Karawang United	Karawang Regency	Singaperbangsa Stadium
Lemahtamba	Cirebon Regency	Watubelah Stadium
Loreng Karawang	Karawang Regency	Singaperbangsa Stadium
Mandala	Majalengka Regency	Warung Jambu Stadium
Maung Anom	Bandung	Siliwangi Stadium
Maung Bandung	Bandung	Siliwangi Stadium
Mutiara 97	Bogor	Pajajaran Stadium
Parma Majalaya	Bandung Regency	Si Jalak Harupat Stadium
Pakuan City	Bogor	Pajajaran Stadium
Patriot Bekasi	Bekasi	Patriot Chandrabhaga Stadium
Perkesit Cianjur	Cianjur Regency	Badak Putih Stadium
Perses Sumedang	Sumedang Regency	Ahmad Yani Sumedang Stadium
Persib Bandung	Bandung Regency; Bandung	Si Jalak Harupat Stadium; Gelora Bandung Lautan Api Stadium
Persigar Garut	Garut Regency	Jayaraga Stadium
Persika Karawang	Karawang Regency	Singaperbangsa Stadium
Persika 1951	Karawang Regency	Singaperbangsa Stadium
Persikab Bandung	Bandung Regency	Si Jalak Harupat Stadium
Persikabbar West Bandung	West Bandung Regency	Bentang Lembang Stadium
Persikabo Bogor	Bogor Regency	Pakansari Stadium
Persikabo 1973	Bogor Regency	Pakansari Stadium
Persikabumi Sukabumi	Sukabumi Regency	Korpri Cisaat Stadium
Persikad Depok	Depok	Merpati Stadium
Persikas Subang	Subang Regency	Persikas Stadium
Persikasi Bekasi	Bekasi Regency	Wibawa Mukti Stadium
Persikoban Banjar	Banjar	Gelora Banjar Patroman Stadium
Persikotas Nusantara	Tasikmalaya	Wiradadaha Stadium
Persikotas Tasikmalaya	Tasikmalaya	Wiradadaha Stadium
Persima Majalengka	Majalengka Regency	Warung Jambu Stadium
Persindra Indramayu	Indramayu Regency	Tridaya Stadium
Persipasi Kota Bekasi	Bekasi	Patriot Chandrabhaga Stadium
Persipo Purwakarta	Purwakarta Regency	Purnawarman Stadium
Persipu Depok	Depok	Merpati Stadium
Persitas Tasikmalaya	Tasikmalaya Regency	Wiradadaha Stadium
Perssi Sukabumi	Sukabumi	Suryakencana Stadium
Pesik Kuningan	Kuningan Regency	Mashud Wisnusaputra Stadium
PLG Parahyangan	Cimahi	Sangkuriang Stadium
POR UNI Bandung	Bandung	Siliwangi Stadium
Progresif Indonesia	Bandung	Siliwangi Stadium
Pro Tunas Rifo	Bandung	Kavaleri Field
PS Amdesta	Bekasi Regency	Mini Tambun Stadium
PS Bara Siliwangi	Bandung	Siliwangi Stadium
PS Cimahi Putra	Cimahi	Sangkuriang Stadium
PSB Bogor	Bogor	Pajajaran Stadium
PSGC Ciamis	Ciamis Regency	Galuh Stadium
PSGJ Cirebon	Cirebon Regency	Ranggajati Stadium
PSIT Cirebon	Cirebon	Bima Stadium
R2B Legend	Bandung	Siliwangi Stadium
Rancaekek	Bandung Regency	Liga Kencana Field
RCK Nusantara	Cianjur Regency	Brimob Cipanas Field
Riverside Forest	Bandung	Taman Sari Field
Roksi	Bandung	Lodaya Field
Saint Prima	Bandung	Lodaya Field
Satria Sanggeni	Bogor Regency	Satria Muda Siliwangi Field
Sayyid Sabiq	Indramayu Regency	Tridaya Stadium
Sukabumi	Sukabumi Regency	Korpri Cisaat Stadium
Sultan Muda	Bandung	Taman Sari Field
Tasik Raya	Tasikmalaya	Wiradadaha Stadium
TS Maung Garut	Garut Regency	Gelora R.A.A. Adiwijaya Stadium
Waamanat Bhintuka	Bandung	Lodaya Field
Young Tigers	Bandung	Sabilulungan Filed

=== West Kalimantan ===
Club	Home city	Stadium
Gabsis Sambas	Sambas Regency	Gabsis Sambas Stadium
Dodos	Kubu Raya Regency	Pematang 7 Village Field
Gelora Sintang	Sintang Regency	Baning Stadium
Kalbar United	Pontianak	Sultan Syarif Abdurrahman Stadium
MIRS 7	Singkawang	Krisdana Stadium
Persibeng Bengkayang	Bengkayang Regency	Bengkayang Stadium
Persikara Kayong Utara	North Kayong Regency	Bukit Tatat Stadium
Persikat Ketapang	Ketapang Regency	Panglima Tentemak Stadium
Persilan Landak	Landak Regency	GOR Patih Gumantar Stadium
Persimel Melawi	Melawi Regency	Sungai Durian Tiong Keranjik Stadium
Persipon Pontianak	Pontianak	Sultan Syarif Abdurrahman Stadium
Persista Sintang	Sintang Regency	Baning Stadium
Persiwah Mempawah	Mempawah Regency	Opu Daeng Manambon Stadium
Persiwang Singkawang	Singkawang	Krisdana Stadium
PS BPBE	Bengkayang Regency	Bengkayang Stadium
PS Delta Khatulistiwa	Pontianak	Keboen Sajoek Stadium
PS Kota Singkawang	Singkawang	Krisdana Stadium
PS Kubu Raya	Kubu Raya Regency	Garuda Stadium
PS Pulau Indah	Sambas Regency	Gabsis Sambas Stadium
PS Sanggau	Sanggau Regency	Gelora Trimulya Stadium
PS Sekadau	Sekadau Regency	Baning Stadium
PSKH Kapuas Hulu	Kapuas Hulu Regency	Gelora Uncak Kapuas Stadium

=== West Nusa Tenggara ===
Club	Home city	Stadium
Bima United	Bima	Manggemaci Stadium
Bintang Ampenan	Mataram	Legenda Malomba Stadium
Bomber	West Sumbawa Regency	Gibraltar Taliwang Stadium
Galaxy	Bima	Manggemaci Stadium
Garuda Muda	West Lombok Regency	Gelora 17 Desember Stadium
INFA	Mataram	Universitas Mataram Stadium
Lebah	Sumbawa Regency	Pragas Stadium
Lombok	West Lombok Regency	Kemenangan Stadium
Mandalika	Central Lombok Regency	Gelora 17 Desember Stadium
Panser	West Sumbawa Regency	Lalu Magaparang Stadium
Persebi Bima	Bima Regency	Gelora Bou Lanta Stadium
Persekobi Bima	Bima	Manggemaci Stadium
Persidom Dompu	Dompu Regency	GOR Dompu Stadium
Persisum Sumbawa	Sumbawa Regency	Pragas Stadium
Perslobar West Lombok	West Lombok Regency	Gelora 17 Desember Stadium
Perslotim East Lombok	East Lombok Regency	Selaparang Stadium
PS Bima Sakti	Mataram	Gelora 17 Desember Stadium
PS Bintang Kejora	East Lombok Regency	Gubuk Motong Field
PS Cordova University	West Sumbawa Regency	Gelora 17 Desember Stadium
PS Daygun	North Lombok Regency	Lingsar Field
PS Fatahillah 354	Mataram	Gelora 17 Desember Stadium
PS Hamzanwadi	East Lombok Regency	Pringgasela Stadium
PS Mataram	Mataram	Gelora 17 Desember Stadium
PS Selaparang Raya	Mataram	Universitas Mataram Stadium
PS Sumbawa	Sumbawa Regency	Cendrawasih Brang Biji Stadium
PSKT Kemutar Telu	West Sumbawa Regency	Lalu Magaparang Stadium
PSLT Central Lombok	Central Lombok Regency	Gelora 17 Desember Stadium

=== West Papua ===
Club	Home city	Stadium
Arfak United	Arfak Mountains Regency	Irai Football Field
Kaimana	Kaimana Regency	Triton Stadium
Kejaksaan	Manokwari Regency	Sanggeng Stadium
Manokwari United	Manokwari Regency	Sanggeng Stadium
Mata'afa	Manokwari Regency	Sanggeng Stadium
Mnukwar	Manokwari Regency	Sanggeng Stadium
Mutiara Timur Bhayangkara PB	Manokwari Regency	Sanggeng Stadium
Perseda Danau Anggi	Arfak Mountains Regency	Irai Football Field
Persegaf Arfak Mountains	Arfak Mountains Regency	Irai Football Field
Perseka Kaimana	Kaimana Regency	Triton Stadium
Perseman Manokwari	Manokwari Regency	Sanggeng Stadium
Persewon Wondama Bay	Teluk Wondama Regency	Miei Football Field
Persifa Fakfak	Fakfak Regency	16 November Stadium
Persimans South Manokwari	South Manokwari Regency	Garuda Football Field
Persipegaf Arfak Mountains	Arfak Mountains Regency	Irai Football Field
Persitelbin Bintuni Bay	Teluk Bintuni Regency	SP IV Manimeri Field
Putra Telbin	Teluk Bintuni Regency	SP IV Manimeri Field
PS Kamasan	Manokwari Regency	Sanggeng Stadium
PS Kasuari	Manokwari Regency	Sanggeng Stadium
PS Manokwari Selatan	South Manokwari Regency	Garuda Football Field
Ransiki	South Manokwari Regency	Garuda Football Field
Torey Brothers	Teluk Wondama Regency	Miei Football Field

=== West Sulawesi ===
Club	Home city	Stadium
Balanipa Mandar	Polewali Mandar Regency	Salim Mengga Stadium
Gasman Majene	Majene Regency	Prasamya Stadium
Gastik Tikke Raya	Pasangkayu Regency	Gelora Djiwa Stadium
Gaswon Wonomulyo	Polewali Mandar Regency	Gaswon Wonomulyo Field
Mandar United	Polewali Mandar Regency	Salim Mengga Stadium
Persimaju Mamuju	Mamuju Regency	Manakarra Stadium
Persema Mamasa	Mamasa Regency	Pongka Padang Stadium
Pespa Pasangkayu	Pasangkayu Regency	Gelora Djiwa Stadium
PS Mamuju Tengah	Central Mamuju Regency	Manakarra Stadium
PS Mamuju Utama	Mamuju Regency	Manakarra Stadium
PS Matra	Pasangkayu Regency	Gelora Djiwa Stadium
PS Polmas	Polewali Mandar Regency	Gaspol Football Field
PS Sandeq	Polewali Mandar Regency	Salim Mengga Stadium
PS Taeso Putra	Mamuju Regency	Manakarra Stadium
OTP37	Mamuju Regency	Manakarra Stadium
Sarudu	Pasangkayu Regency	Gelora Djiwa Stadium

=== West Sumatra ===
Club	Home city	Stadium
Aroma Taram	Lima Puluh Kota Regency	Singa Harau Stadium
Absolute	Solok Regency	Tuanku Tabiang Stadium
Batang Anai	Padang Pariaman Regency	Bukik Bunian Stadium
Dualipa	Lima Puluh Kota Regency	Singa Harau Stadium
GMR Tanah Datar	Tanah Datar Regency	Gumarang Stadium
Gasliko 50 Kota	Lima Puluh Kota Regency	Singa Harau Stadium
Gumarang FKNB	Tanah Datar Regency	Gumarang Stadium
Josal Piaman	Padang Pariaman Regency	Kampung Dalam Field
Kompak Kampung Pisang	Padang	Kompak Anak Air Field
PES Pessel Pesisir Selatan	Pesisir Selatan Regency	Halilintar Stadium
Persepak Payakumbuh	Payakumbuh	Kubugadang Stadium
Persepar Pariaman	Padang Pariaman Regency	Durian Nan Gadang Stadium
Persiju Sijunjung	Sijunjung Regency	M. Yamin Stadium
Persikas Solok	Solok Regency	Tuanku Tabiang Stadium
Persikatim East Sikapak	Pariaman	Mini Persikatim Stadium
Persikopa Pariaman	Pariaman	Mini Basoka Football Stadium
Persis Solok	Solok Regency	Tuanku Tabiang Stadium
PS Dharmasraya	Dharmasraya Regency	GOR Dharmasraya Stadium
PS GAS Sawahlunto	Sawahlunto	Ombilin Stadium
PS Machudum	Padang	Gelora Haji Agus Salim Stadium
PS Mentawai	Mentawai Islands Regency	Sido Makmur SP II Field
PS Pasbar	West Pasaman Regency	GOR Pasaman Barat Stadium
PSBS Batusangkar	Tanah Datar Regency	Gumarang Stadium
PSKA Agam	Agam Regency	Padang Laweh Field
PSKB Bukittinggi	Bukittinggi	Ateh Ngarai Stadium
PSKPS Pasaman	Pasaman Regency	Tuanku Imam Bonjol Stadium
PSLA Sicincin	Padang Pariaman Regency	Puabu Sicincin Field
PSP Padang	Padang	Gelora Haji Agus Salim Stadium
PSPP Padang Panjang	Padang Panjang	Chatib Sulaiman Stadium
Ricefield Town	Solok	H. Marah Adin Stadium
SEL 50 Kota	Lima Puluh Kota Regency	Singo Harau Stadium
Semen Padang	Padang	Gelora Haji Agus Salim Stadium
Sukur	Pariaman	Pauh Kurai Taji Field

== Clubs moving/merging ==
- Pupuk Kaltim → PKT Bontang → Bontang
- Perseba Bangkalan → Pusamania Borneo → Borneo Samarinda
- Persebo Bondowoso → Persebo Musi Raya → Madura
- Perseka Kaimana → Perseka Manokwari → Perseka Kaimana
- Perseru Serui → Perseru Badak Lampung → Badak Lampung
- Persigo Gorontalo → Semeru Lumajang → PS Hizbul Wathan → Hizbul Wathan
- Persijatim East Jakarta → Sriwijaya
- Persikad Depok → Bogor → Sulut United
- Persikubar West Kutai → Persebaya (DU) → Persebaya (ISL) → Persebaya United → Bonek → Surabaya United → Bhayangkara Surabaya United → Bhayangkara → Bhayangkara Solo → Bhayangkara Presisi Indonesia
- Persiram Raja Ampat → PS TNI → PS TIRA + Persikabo Bogor → PS TIRA Persikabo → Persikabo 1973
- Persires Rengat + Bali Devata → Persires Bali Devata → Persires Cirebon → Persires Kuningan → Persires Banjarnegara → Persires Sukoharjo → Persires Rengat → PS Lampung Sakti → Lampung Sakti
- Persisam Samarinda + Putra Samarinda → Persisam Putra Samarinda → Bali United
- Persih Tembilahan → Persih Masurai → Masurai
- Aceh United + PS Timah Babel → Babel United → Muba Babel United → Muba United → Persipal BU → Persipal Palu
- AS Abadi → KS Tiga Naga
- Blitar United → Bandung United
- Cilegon United → RANS Cilegon → RANS Nusantara
- Jember United → AC Majapahit
- Laga → Sragen United
- Mataram Indocement → Indocement Cirebon
- Martapura → Martapura Dewa United → Dewa United
- Niac Mitra → Mitra Surabaya → Mitra Kalteng Putra → PS Mitra Kukar
- Pelita Jaya → Arema Cronus → Arema
- Pelita Jaya → Pelita Krakatau Steel Cilegon → Pelita Jaya Cilegon → Pelita Jaya Purwakarta → Pelita Jaya Karawang → Pelita Jaya + Bandung Raya → Pelita Bandung Raya + Persipasi Bekasi → Persipasi Bandung Raya → Madura United
- PS Bintang Jaya Asahan + YSK 757 → 757 Kepri Jaya
- Putra Ijen → Putra Sinar Giri → PSG Pati → AHHA PS Pati → Bekasi → Bekasi City
- Solok + Equator Luak 50 Kota → SEL 50 Kota
- Villa 2000 → Celebest
- Persebam Babakan Madang → Depok City
- Kabomania → Kabomania Citra → Cimahi Putra
- Patriot Chandrabaga + Persipasi Bekasi → PCB Persipasi → Persipasi Kota Bekasi
- Bareti 1698 → Karawang United
- Spektra → Spektra Trisula
- Persiwaka Way Kanan → Putra Way Kanan
- Bintang Junior → Internazionale Banten → KS Inter Banten
- Medan Soccer → Pelita Medan Soccer
- Putra Jombang → Putra Delta Sidoarjo → Malut United → Java United
- Mataram Utama → Nusantara United → Nusantara Lampung → Persikotas Nusantara
- Mars Gelatik → Persikad 1999 + Sumut United → Persikad Depok
- Fearless Bandung → Persekabtas Tasikmalaya → Persika 1951
- Persema 1953 → AFA Syailendra → Pasuruan United
- Sang Maestro + Persinab Nabire → Persinab Sang Maestro → Persinab Nabire
- NZR Sumbersari + Persikutim East Kutai → Persikutim United
- Sam's Soccer Club → BBP Putra Wonogiri
- Tulehu United → FC Pare
- Persikas Subang → Sumsel United
- Persikoci Cimahi → PSKC Cimahi → Garudayaksa

== Defunct clubs ==
- Aceh United (2010–2019)
- Adhyaksa Banten (2024–2026)
- Alesha (2019–2022)
- Arseto (1978–1988)
- Assyabaab Surabaya (1948–1997)
- Babel United (2020)
- Badak Lampung (2019–2023)
- Bali Devata (2010–2011)
- Banyuwangi Putra (2009–2026)
- Bareti 1698 (1998–2021)
- Batavia Union (2010–2011)
- Bintang Medan (2010–2011)
- Blitar United (2012–2019)
- Bogor (2017–2019)
- Bonek (2015–2016)
- Cendrawasih Papua (2010–2011)
- Cilegon United (2012–2021)
- Dejan (2018–2026)
- Farmel (2020–2024)
- FC Bekasi City (2922–2026)
- Indocement Cirebon (–2002)
- Jember United (2010–2019)
- Kabomania (2008–2021)
- Krama Yudha Tiga Berlian (1984–1991)
- Makassar Utama
- Malut United (2023–2026)
- Martapura (2009–2021)
- Muba Babel United (2022)
- Nusantara Lampung (2022–2026)
- NZR Sumbersari (1985–2025)
- Perkesa Mataram (1978–1992)
- Pelalawan United (2019)
- Persebo Bondowoso (1964–2016)
- Persebo Musi Raya (2017)
- Persebam Babakan Madang (–2020)
- Persedil Dili (–1999)
- Persegi Gianyar (2006–2011)
- Persekaba Badung (1970–2007)
- Persekabtas Tasikmalaya (2018–2022)
- Perseru Serui (1970–2019)
- Persibal Bali
- Persigarsel South Garut (2019–2022)
- Persikad Depok (1990–2017)
- Persikubar West Kutai (–2010)
- Persil Lampung
- Persipal Palu (2022–2026)
- Persiram Raja Ampat (2004–2015)
- Persires Rengat (2017–2019)
- Persisam Putra Samarinda (1989–2014)
- Persiwa Wamena (1972–2018)
- Pro Duta (1986–2017)
- PS BPD Jateng (1988–1996)
- PS Gelora Dewata 89 (1989–2001)
- PS Lampung Sakti (2017–2019)
- PS Pusri Palembang
- PSAD Surabaya (2019)
- PSG Gresik (2020)
- PSG Pati (2021)
- PSKC Cimahi (2001–2025)
- PSTT Tanjungkarang-Telukbetung (–1983)
- Putra Delta Sidoarjo (2022–2023)
- Sang Maestro (2016–2025)
- Semarang United (2010–2011)
- Semeru (2017–2020)
- Solok (2017–2019)
- Sukabumi (2022)
- Sumut United (2019–2025)
- Surabaya United (2015)
- Tangerang Wolves (2010–2011)
- Tornado Pekanbaru (2018–2025)
- Tri Brata Rafflesia (2021–2026)
- Tulehu United (2021–2024)

== See also ==
- List of women's football clubs in Indonesia
- Indonesia national football team
- Indonesian football league system
