= 2022 Liga 3 Riau =

Aulia Hospital Liga 3

Tournament details
- Country: Indonesia
- Dates: 1 October 2022
- Teams: 19
- Qualified for: 2022 Liga 3 National Round

Tournament statistics
- Matches played: 17
- Goals scored: 47 (2.76 per match)

The 2022 Liga 3 Riau or 2022 Aulia Hospital Liga 3 for sponsor reasons, is the fifth season of Liga 3 Riau organized by Asprov PSSI Riau.

Followed by 19 clubs. The winner of this competition will advance to the national round representing Riau Province for promotion to Liga 2.

PS Siak is the defending champion after winning it in the 2021 season.

== Teams ==
2022 Liga 3 Riau was attended by 19 teams.

| No | Team | Location |
|---|---|---|
| 01 | Air Molek | Indragiri Hulu Regency |
| 02 | Lindai Sinau | Kampar Regency |
| 03 | KS Tiga Naga | Kampar Regency |
| 04 | PSBS Bangkinang | Kampar Regency |
| 05 | Universitas Pahlawan | Kampar Regency |
| 06 | Pendalian | Pelalawan Regency |
| 07 | Nabil | Pelalawan Regency |
| 08 | KNPI Bernas | Pelalawan Regency |
| 09 | PS Petalangan | Pelalawan Regency |
| 10 | Bagan Siapi-api | Rokan Hilir Regency |
| 11 | Pancasona Abadi | Siak Regency |
| 12 | PS Siak | Siak Regency |
| 13 | Pekanbaru Warriors | Pekanbaru |
| 14 | Perfisi | Pekanbaru |
| 15 | Teacher United Indonesia | Pekanbaru |
| 16 | Pekanbaru United | Pekanbaru |
| 17 | Wahana | Pekanbaru |
| 18 | Tornado | Pekanbaru |
| 19 | Rumbai | Pekanbaru |

== Group stage ==
=== Group A ===
| Pos | Team | Pld | W | D | L | GF | GA | GD | Pts | Qualification | PSP | NAB | AIR | TUI |
|---|---|---|---|---|---|---|---|---|---|---|---|---|---|---|
| 1 | PS Petalangan | 1 | 1 | 0 | 0 | 1 | 0 | +1 | 3 | Advance to Knockout stage | — | | | 1–0 |
| 2 | Nabil | 0 | 0 | 0 | 0 | 0 | 0 | 0 | 0 | Advance to Knockout stage | | — | | |
| 3 | Air Molek | 0 | 0 | 0 | 0 | 0 | 0 | 0 | 0 | | | | — | |
| 4 | Teacher United Indonesia | 1 | 0 | 0 | 1 | 0 | 1 | −1 | 0 | | | | | — |

Updated to match(es) played on unknown. Source: Liga 3 2022 Riau

=== Group B ===
| Pos | Team | Pld | W | D | L | GF | GA | GD | Pts | Qualification | SIA | TOR | WHN | KBE | RUM |
|---|---|---|---|---|---|---|---|---|---|---|---|---|---|---|---|
| 1 | PS Siak | 4 | 4 | 0 | 0 | 10 | 1 | +9 | 12 | Advance to Knockout stage | — | 1–0 | 3–1 | 3–0 | |
| 2 | Tornado | 4 | 3 | 0 | 1 | 13 | 1 | +12 | 9 | Advance to Knockout stage | | — | | 2–0 | 8–0 |
| 3 | Wahana | 4 | 2 | 0 | 2 | 10 | 8 | +2 | 6 | | | 0–3 | — | | 6–0 |
| 4 | KNPI Bernas | 4 | 1 | 0 | 3 | 6 | 8 | −2 | 3 | | | | 2–3 | — | |
| 5 | Rumbai | 4 | 0 | 0 | 4 | 0 | 21 | −21 | 0 | | 0–3 | | | 0–4 | — |

Updated to match(es) played on unknown. Source: Liga 3 2022 Riau

=== Group C ===
| Pos | Team | Pld | W | D | L | GF | GA | GD | Pts | Qualification | PDL | LIN | BAN | UPA | PUN |
|---|---|---|---|---|---|---|---|---|---|---|---|---|---|---|---|
| 1 | PS Pendalian | 4 | 4 | 0 | 0 | 8 | 1 | +7 | 12 | Advance to Knockout stage | — | 2–0 | 2–1 | | |
| 2 | Lindai Sinau | 4 | 2 | 1 | 1 | 6 | 5 | +1 | 7 | Advance to Knockout stage | | — | 2–0 | | |
| 3 | PSBS | 4 | 1 | 1 | 2 | 4 | 4 | 0 | 4 | | | | — | | 3–0 |
| 4 | Universitas Pahlawan | 4 | 0 | 3 | 1 | 4 | 6 | −2 | 3 | | 0–2 | 2–2 | 0–0 | — | 2–2 |
| 5 | Pekanbaru United | 4 | 0 | 1 | 3 | 3 | 9 | −6 | 1 | | 0–2 | 1–2 | | | — |

Updated to match(es) played on unknown. Source: Liga 3 2022 Riau

=== Group D ===
| Pos | Team | Pld | W | D | L | GF | GA | GD | Pts | Qualification | KTN | PWR | PFS | PAB | BSA |
|---|---|---|---|---|---|---|---|---|---|---|---|---|---|---|---|
| 1 | KS Tiga Naga | 4 | 3 | 1 | 0 | 10 | 3 | +7 | 10 | Advance to Knockout stage | — | 2–1 | | 4–1 | |
| 2 | Pekanbaru Warriors | 4 | 3 | 0 | 1 | 9 | 2 | +7 | 9 | Advance to Knockout stage | | — | 3–0 | | 3–0 |
| 3 | Perfisi | 4 | 2 | 1 | 1 | 4 | 4 | 0 | 7 | | 1–1 | | — | | 2–0 |
| 4 | Pancasona Abadi | 4 | 1 | 0 | 3 | 4 | 7 | −3 | 3 | | | 0–2 | 0–1 | — | |
| 5 | Bagan Siapi-api | 4 | 0 | 0 | 4 | 0 | 11 | −11 | 0 | | 0–3 | | | 0–3 | — |

Updated to match(es) played on unknown. Source: Liga 3 2022 Riau

== Knockout stage ==
Wait for the completion of the group stage first.
