= 2021 Liga 3 Maluku =

Tournament details
- Dates: 23 September-12 October 2021
- Teams: 10

Final positions
- Champions: Maluku (1st title)
- Runners-up: Gemba
- Third place: Tulehu United
- Fourth place: Wainuru

Tournament statistics
- Matches played: 24
- Goals scored: 76 (3.17 per match)

The 2021 Liga 3 Maluku would be the sixth editions of Liga 3 (formerly known as Liga Nusantara) as a qualifying round for the national round of 2021–22 Liga 3.

PS Hatusela Mamala were the defending champion but they are not participating in this season.

== Teams ==
There are 10 teams participated in the league this season.

Team	Location
Binatama Bupolo	Buru Regency
Dolorosa	Southeast Maluku Regency
Gemba	West Seram Regency
Hila Putra	Central Maluku Regency
Maluku	Ambon
Maluku United	Ambon
PSHL Hitu Leitimur	Ambon
Siwalima	Ambon
Tulehu United	Central Maluku Regency
Wainuru	Central Maluku Regency

== Group stage ==
=== Group A ===
Pos	Team	Pld	W	D	L	GF	GA	GD	Pts	Qualification
1	Gemba	4	3	0	1	5	3	+2	9	Advanced to semi final
2	Tulehu United	4	2	1	1	11	5	+6	7	Advanced to semi final
3	Maluku United	4	1	1	2	4	6	−2	4	
4	Dolorosa	4	1	1	2	4	7	−3	4	
5	Hila Putra	4	1	1	2	3	6	−3	4	

=== Group B ===
Pos	Team	Pld	W	D	L	GF	GA	GD	Pts	Qualification
1	Maluku	4	2	2	0	13	1	+12	8	Advanced to semi final
2	Wainuru	4	2	2	0	5	2	+3	8	Advanced to semi final
3	Siwalima	4	2	1	1	14	1	+13	7	
4	Binatama Bupolo	4	1	0	3	6	10	−4	3	
5	PSHL Hitu Leitimur	4	0	1	3	2	26	−24	1	

== Knockout stage ==
=== Semi final ===
7 October 2021
15.00 UTC+9

Gemba	3–1	Wainuru

Kompi A Raider 733/Masariku Field, Ambon

8 October 2021
15.00 UTC+9

Maluku	2–1	Tulehu United

Kompi A Raider 733/Masariku Field, Ambon

=== Third place play-off ===
11 October 2021
15.00 UTC+9

Wainuru	0–1	Tulehu United

Kompi A Raider 733/Masariku Field, Ambon

=== Final ===
12 October 2021
15.00 UTC+9

Gemba	0–1	Maluku

Kompi A Raider 733/Masariku Field, Ambon
Referee: Robo Anggoda

== Top goalscorer ==
No	Players	Teams	Goals
1	Fanky Pasamba	Maluku	6
2	Fikram Nasela	Tulehu United	5
2	Karman Buton	Binatama Bupolo	5
3	Hanok Lesilolo	Gemba	4
3	Ilmin Ohorella	Siwalima	4
4	Ahmad Dani Kiat	Maluku	3
4	Fuad Tunaya	Tulehu United	3
5	Darman Hendra	Gemba	2
5	Rafjan Bayauw	Tulehu United	2
5	Abu Patiha	Siwalima	2
5	Zulkifli Nasela	Siwalima	2
5	Rizky Bayauw	Siwalima	2
