= PSAA =

PSAA or psaA may refer to:

== Education ==
- Public Schools Accountability Act
- Puget Sound Adventist Academy

== Sports ==
- Pickleball South Australia Association
- Poona Schools Athletics Association
- Private Schools Athletic Association
- PSAA Abulyatama, an Indonesian football club

== Other ==
- Product support and assurance agreement
- Public Sector Audit Appointments
- psaA, a photosynthesis protein
