= Dua Lipa (disambiguation) =

Dua Lipa (born 1995) is an English singer and songwriter.

Dua Lipa may also refer to:

- Dua Lipa (album), a 2017 album by Dua Lipa
- "Dua Lipa" (song), a song by Jack Harlow from his 2022 album Come Home the Kids Miss You
- Dua Lipa: At Your Service, a 2022 podcast by Dua Lipa

== See also ==
- Dualipa F.C., Indonesian football club
