= 2017 Liga 3 Central Sulawesi =

Liga 3 Central Sulawesi
- Season: 2017
- All statistics correct as of 31 July 2017.

The 2017 Liga 3 Central Sulawesi is a qualifying round for the national round of 2017 Liga 3.

== Format ==
In this competition, the teams are divided into two groups of four. The winner will represent Central Sulawesi Region in national round of 2017 Liga 3.

== Teams ==
There are 8 clubs which will participate the league in this season.

#	Clubs
1	Bandar Sulteng
2	Persibal Luwuk
3	Persido Donggala
4	Persigi Sigi
5	Persipal Palu
6	Poso Energi F.C.
7	Poso F.C.
8	PS Poso

== Group stage ==
This stage scheduled starts on 25 July 2017.

=== Group A ===
Pos	Team	Pld	W	D	L	GF	GA	GD	Pts	Qualification
1	Persido Donggala (A)	3	3	0	0	9	2	+7	9	Advance to semifinals
2	Bandar Sulteng (A)	3	2	0	1	7	4	+3	6	Advance to semifinals
3	Persibal Luwuk	3	1	0	2	5	7	−2	3	
4	Poso F.C.	3	0	0	3	3	11	−8	0	

Updated to match(es) played on 31 July 2017. Source:
(A) Advance to a further round
25 July 2017
16:00 WITA

Bandar Sulteng	3-1	Persibal Luwuk

Murni Mini Stadium, Labuan Panimba
27 July 2017
16:30 WITA

Poso F.C.	1-4	Persido Donggala

Murni Mini Stadium, Labuan Panimba
29 July 2017
14:00 WITA

Persibal Luwuk	3-2	Poso F.C.

Murni Mini Stadium, Labuan Panimba
29 July 2017
16:00 WITA

Persido Donggala	3-0	Bandar Sulteng

Murni Mini Stadium, Labuan Panimba
31 July 2017
14:00 WITA

Persibal Luwuk	1-2	Persido Donggala

Murni Mini Stadium, Labuan Panimba
31 July 2017
16:00 WITA

Bandar Sulteng	4-0	Poso F.C.

Murni Mini Stadium, Labuan Panimba

=== Group B ===
Pos	Team	Pld	W	D	L	GF	GA	GD	Pts	Qualification
1	Persipal Palu (A)	3	2	1	0	7	2	+5	7	Advance to semifinals
2	Persigi Sigi (A)	3	2	0	1	9	5	+4	6	Advance to semifinals
3	Poso Energi FC	3	1	1	1	7	10	−3	4	
4	PS Poso	3	0	0	3	4	10	−6	0	

Updated to match(es) played on 31 July 2017. Source:
(A) Advance to a further round
26 July 2017
14:00 WITA

Persipal Palu	2-1	Persigi Sigi
Tasrif 38'; Rahman	Report	Andri

Murni Mini Stadium, Labuan Panimba
26 July 2017
16:00 WITA

Poso Energi F.C.	4-3	PS Poso

Murni Mini Stadium, Labuan Panimba
28 July 2017
14:00 WITA

Persigi Sigi	6-2	Poso Energi F.C.

Murni Mini Stadium, Labuan Panimba
28 July 2017
16:00 WITA

PS Poso	0-4	Persipal Palu
		Aripo 4'; Ikbal 20', 75'; Abdillah 65'

Murni Mini Stadium, Labuan Panimba
30 July 2017
14:00 WITA

Persipal Palu	1-1	Poso Energi F.C.
Fikal 68'		Reki Wokunde 13'

Murni Mini Stadium, Labuan Panimba
30 July 2017
16:00 WITA

Persigi Sigi	2-1	PS Poso

Murni Mini Stadium, Labuan Panimba

== Knockout stage ==
Semifinals
3 August – Donggala
Persido Donggala	1
Persigi Sigi	3
4 August – Donggala
Persipal Palu	3
Bandar Sulteng	1

Final
6 August – Donggala
Persigi Sigi	0(2)
Persipal Palu (pen.)	0(4)

=== Semifinals ===
3 August 2017
15:30 WITA

Persido Donggala	1-3	Persigi Sigi

Murni Mini Stadium, Labuan Panimba
4 August 2017
15:30 WITA

Persipal Palu	3-1	Bandar Sulteng

Murni Mini Stadium, Labuan Panimba

=== Final ===
5 August 2017
15:30 WITA

Persigi Sigi	0-0 (a.e.t.)	Persipal Palu
Penalties
	2-4

Murni Mini Stadium, Labuan Panimba
