= Maluku F.C. =

Indonesian football club

Maluku
- Full name: Maluku Football Club
- Nicknames: Pattimura Muda (Young Pattimura); Nuri Pelangi (The Rainbow Parrot)
- Short name: MAL
- Founded: 27 January 2021; 5 years ago
- Ground: Mandala Remaja Stadium; Ambon, Maluku
- Capacity: 20,000
- Owner: Irwan Maulana
- CEO: Irwan Maulana
- Manager: Saidna Azhar
- Coach: Lutfi Lestaluhu
- League: Liga 4
- 2023: Liga 3, 1st (Maluku zone)
Home colours	Away colours

Maluku Football Club is an Indonesian professional football club founded on 27 January 2021 and based in Ambon, Maluku province. They currently compete in the Liga 4.

== History ==
Maluku FC was founded on 27 January 2021, with an aim of promoting football in Maluku, which has long been absent from its relevant representative.

On 25 September 2021, Maluku FC made league match debut in a 7–1 win against Binatama Bupolo at the Kompi A Yonif 733/Raider Waiheru field, the achievement of 3 points at the same time led the club to top the provisional standings of Group B Liga 3 Maluku.

On 12 October 2021, 2021 Liga 3 Maluku has been held and Maluku FC has become the champion to represent the province at the national level, not only being a regional champion, Maluku FC has been undefeated in the struggle in the league zone since the competition was held on September 23, 2021. In the final match, they win against Gemba with a score 1–0.

Maluku FC made history again in Liga 3 Maluku zone by winning the third time. Maluku FC won the 2023 Liga 3 Maluku on 16 December 2023, at Lantamal Halong Field, Ambon. The certainty was obtained after they beat Dolorosa with a score of 2–0 in their last match. They collected 15 points from 16 matches, or got five wins and lost once throughout the tournament.

== Stadium ==
Maluku FC uses the Mandala Remaja Stadium in Ambon for their home matches.

== Honours ==
- Liga 3 Maluku
  - Champions (3): 2021, 2022, 2023
