= 2023 Liga 3 Maluku =

Tournament details
- Venue: 1
- Dates: 2 – 16 December 2023
- Teams: 4

Final positions
- Champions: Maluku (3rd title)
- Runners-up: PS Pelauw Putra
- Qualified for: 2023–24 Liga 3 National Phase

Tournament statistics
- Matches played: 12
- Goals scored: 46 (3.83 per match)

The 2023 Liga 3 Maluku is the eighth season of Liga 3 Maluku organized by Asprov PSSI Maluku.

Maluku are the defending champion after winning it in the 2022 Season.

== Teams ==
There are 4 teams participated in the league this season.

No.	Team	Location
1	Maluku	Ambon City
2	Mandala Laimu	Central Maluku Regency
3	PS Pelauw Putra	Central Maluku Regency
4	Dolorosa	Southeast Maluku Regency

== Venue ==
- Lantamal IX Halong Soccer Field, Ambon City

== League table ==
Pos	Team	Pld	W	D	L	GF	GA	GD	Pts	Qualification
1	Maluku (C)	6	5	0	1	14	6	+8	15	Winner and qualified to National Phase
2	PS Pelauw Putra	6	4	1	1	17	11	+6	13	Qualified to National Phase
3	Mandala Laimu	6	2	1	3	15	12	+3	7	
4	Dolorosa	6	0	0	6	1	18	−17	0	

Source: Asprov PSSI Maluku
(C) Champions

== Matches ==
Matchday 1

2 December 2023
15.30 WIT

Maluku	3–1	PS Pelauw Putra
Sahar Tehupelasury 18'; Jordan Irab 27'; M. Aprisal Karim 71' (pen.)	Report	Abdul Haris Tuakia 75' (pen.)

Lantamal IX Halong Soccer Field, Ambon City
3 December 2023
16.30 WIT

Mandala Laimu	2–0	Dolorosa
Salim Ohorella 10', 51'	Report

Lantamal IX Halong Soccer Field, Ambon City

Matchday 2

7 December 2023
14.30 WIT

Maluku	3–1	Mandala Laimu
Jordan Irab 6'; Sahar Tehupelasury 40'; M. Aprisal Karim 75' (pen.)	Report	Ali Umarella 65'

Lantamal IX Halong Soccer Field, Ambon City
7 December 2023
16.30 WIT

PS Pelauw Putra	3–0	Dolorosa
Ahmad Dani Yasri 15'; Julfan Mahu 27'; Hany Tuasikal 39'	Report

Lantamal IX Halong Soccer Field, Ambon City

Matchday 3

10 December 2023
14.30 WIT

Mandala Laimu	4–4	PS Pelauw Putra
	Report

Lantamal IX Halong Soccer Field, Ambon City
10 December 2023
16.30 WIT

Dolorosa	0–3	Maluku
	Report

Lantamal IX Halong Soccer Field, Ambon City

Matchday 4

12 December 2023
14.30 WIT

Dolorosa	0−5	Mandala Laimu
	Report

Lantamal IX Halong Soccer Field, Ambon City
12 December 2023
16.30 WIT

PS Pelauw Putra	3−1	Maluku
Syaiful Rumasilan 35' (?); Julfan Mahu 65'	Report	M. Aprisal Karim 87'

Lantamal IX Halong Soccer Field, Ambon City

Matchday 5

14 December 2023
14.30 WIT

Dolorosa	1–3	PS Pelauw Putra
	Report

Lantamal IX Halong Soccer Field, Ambon City
14 December 2023
16.30 WIT

Mandala Laimu	1–2	Maluku
Julkarnain Selumena 5'	Report	Sahar Tehupelasury 80'; Omar Albar 28'

Lantamal IX Halong Soccer Field, Ambon City

Matchday 6

16 December 2023
14.30 WIT

Maluku	2–0	Dolorosa
	Report

Lantamal IX Halong Soccer Field, Ambon City
16 December 2023
16.30 WIT

PS Pelauw Putra	3–2	Mandala Laimu
	Report

Lantamal IX Halong Soccer Field, Ambon City

== Qualification to the national phase ==
Team	Method of qualification	Date of qualification	Qualified to
Maluku	2023 Liga 3 Maluku champions	16 December 2023	2023–24 Liga 3 National Phase
PS Pelauw Putra	2023 Liga 3 Maluku runner-up	16 December 2023	2023–24 Liga 3 National Phase

== See also ==
- 2023–24 Liga 3 National Phase
- 2023 Liga 3 West Sulawesi
- 2023 Liga 3 South Sulawesi
- 2023 Liga 3 Southeast Sulawesi
