= PSSK Selayar =

Association football team in Indonesia

- Full name: Persatuan Sepakbola Selayar Kepulauan
- Nickname: Pasukan Tana Doang
- Founded: 1962; 64 years ago
- Ground: Pemuda Benteng Field; Selayar Islands, South Sulawesi
- Capacity: 2,000
- Owner: PSSI Selayar Islands
- Chairman: Muhammad Aqsa Ramadhan
- Coach: Sofyan Haeruddin
- League: Liga 4
- 2021: Liga 3, 4th in First Round of Group B (South Sulawesi zone)
Home colours

Persatuan Sepakbola Selayar Kepulauan, simply known as PSSK Selayar, is an Indonesian football club based in Selayar Islands Regency, South Sulawesi. They currently compete in the Liga 4.

== History ==
PSSK Selayar was established in July 1962, the establishment of the club was spearheaded by sportsmen in Benteng, Selayar Islands under the name Persatuan Sepakbola Selajar Kepulauan or PSSK for short. Their goal is to become a member of PSSI and develop soccer organizations located in the level area of Selayar II. Selayar Islands Regency is a district established under Law no. 29 of 1959 concerning the Establishment of Level II Regions in Sulawesi. Selayar Regency wants to change its name to Selayar Maritime Regency. However, in Law no. 17 of 1985, does not recognize a "maritime state", but an "archipelagic state". Therefore, Selayar Regency was renamed Selayar Islands Regency. Along with the implementation of the Indonesian Spelling System from Van Ophuijsen Spelling System, the word Selajar was changed to Selayar and had implications for PSSK's long name, namely Persatuan Sepakbola Selayar Kepulauan.
