= Pekanbaru United F.C. =

Indonesian football club

- Full name: Pekanbaru United Football Club
- Short name: PUFC
- Founded: 2019; 7 years ago
- Ground: Kaharudin Nasution Rumbai Stadium; Rumbai, Pekanbaru, Riau
- Capacity: 15,000
- Owner: Herman Dzumafo
- Manager: Gita Fasmiyadi
- Coach: M. Subra
- League: Liga 4
- 2021: 3rd in Group A, (Riau zone)
- Website: https://www.pekanbaruunitedfc.id/2020/09/struktur.html?m=1
| Home colours | Away colours |

Pekanbaru United Football Club (simply known as Pekanbaru United FC) is an Indonesian football club based in Pekanbaru, Riau. They currently compete in the Liga 4.

== History ==
Pekanbaru United FC was established in 2019, they are based on the interests of fostering the younger generation above the interests of groups and individuals as a manifestation to advance Pekanbaru regional football, especially Riau, and in 2020, Indonesian professional footballer, Herman Dzumafo now have a new assignment in one of these teams, he officially became the president and owner of the club. He does not work alone, he is accompanied by Musdalil Amri (vice president), Muhammad Teza Taufik (secretary) and Maria Makdalena Hutahaean (treasurer). They collaborated with one of the Liga 1 club in October 2020, Borneo. In November 2020, Pekanbaru United has officially become a new member of the PSSI Riau Provincial Association (Asprov) through the PSSI Riau Asprov annual congress.

On 6 November 2021, Pekanbaru United made their first league match debut in a 1–1 draw against club from Kampar PSBS Bangkinang at the Tuanku Tambusai Stadium.
