= Barombong Stadium =

Stadium in Makassar, Indonesia

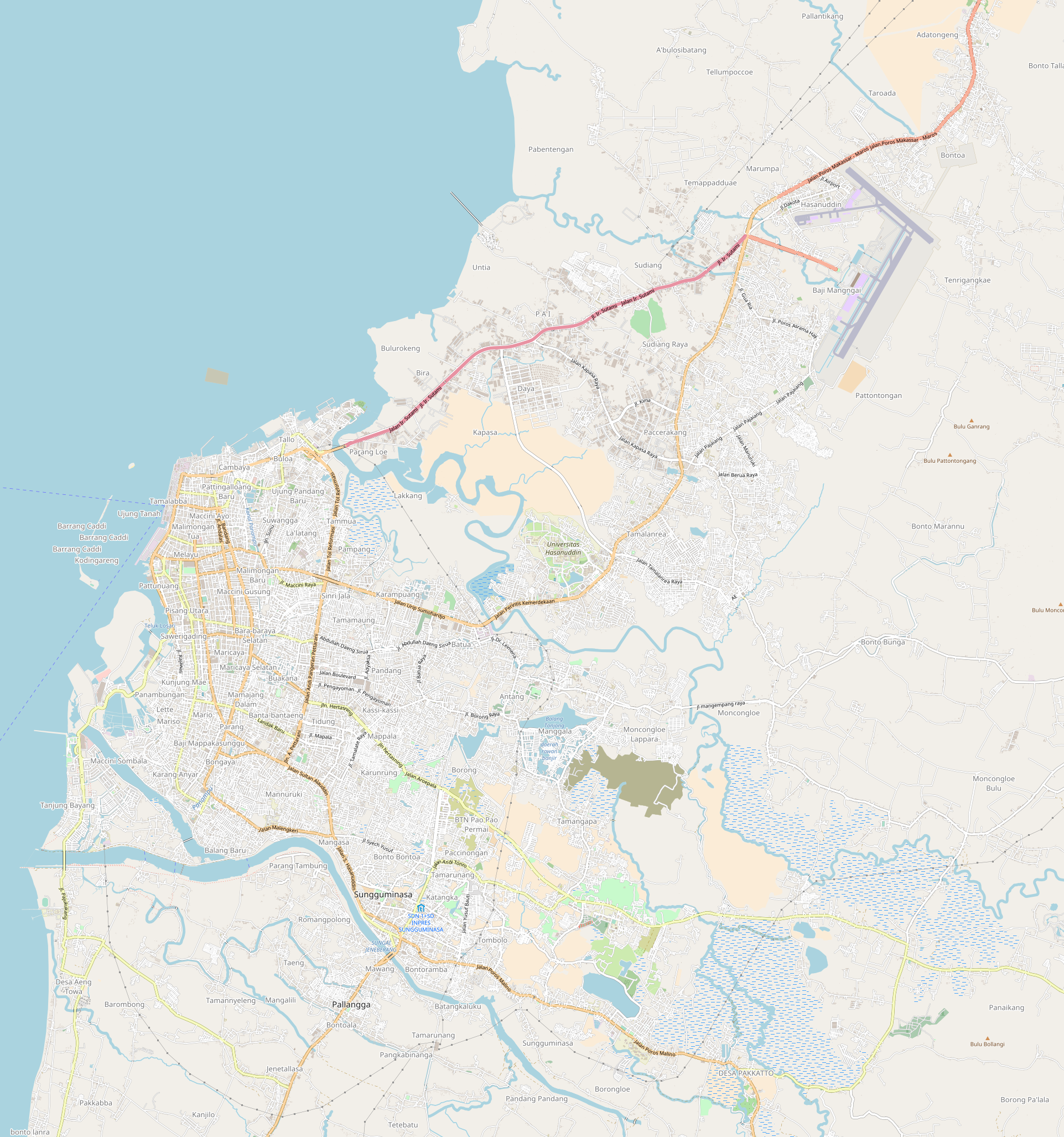
- Location in Makassar, Sulawesi and Indonesia Barombong Stadium (Sulawesi) Barombong Stadium (Indonesia)
- Address: Barombong, Tamalate, Makassar, South Sulawesi 90225; Indonesia
- Location: Makassar, South Sulawesi
- Coordinates: 5°12′6.69″S 119°22′59.63″E
- Owner: South Sulawesi Provincial Government
- Operator: South Sulawesi Provincial Government
- Capacity: 40,000
- Surface: Grass field

Construction
- Groundbreaking: 31 January 2011
- Opened: 7 April 2018 (limited)
- Cost: Rp 100,000,000,000

Tenant
- PSM Makassar

Barombong Stadium is a stadium in Makassar, South Sulawesi, Indonesia. It is mostly used for football matches and is the new home stadium of PSM Makassar.

The stadium was built in late January 2011.
