= PSAS Babah Buloh =

Association football club in Indonesia

- Full name: Persatuan Sepakbola Ayi Sinaga Babah Buloh
- Nickname: Laskar Babah Buloh
- Short name: PSAS
- Founded: 2019; 7 years ago
- Ground: Mini Babah Buloh Stadium; North Aceh, Aceh
- Owner: PSSI North Aceh
- Coach: Edi Junaidi
- League: Liga 4
- 2021: 3rd in Group D, (Liga 3 Aceh zone)
Home colours	Away colours

Persatuan Sepakbola Ayi Sinaga Babah Buloh (simply known as PSAS Babah Buloh) is an Indonesian football club based in North Aceh Regency, Aceh. They currently compete in the Liga 4 Aceh zone.
