= Bansar F.C. =

Indonesian football club in North Sumatra

Bansar FC
- Full name: Bansar Football Club
- Nickname: Laskar Bangun Sari
- Short name: BFC
- Founded: 10 October 2010; 15 years ago
- Ground: Kebun Bunga Stadium; Medan, North Sumatra
- Owner: Askab PSSI Langkat
- Chairman: Endra Gunawan
- Coach: Anto Ritonga
- League: Liga 3
- 2021: 4th in Group B, (North Sumatra zone)
Home colours	Away colours

Bansar Football Club (simply known as Bansar FC) is an Indonesian football club based in Langkat Regency, North Sumatra. They currently compete in the Liga 3 and their homeground is Kebun Bunga Stadium.
