= PS GAS Sawahlunto =

Indonesian football club

- Full name: Persatuan Sepakbola Gunung Arang Sawahlunto
- Nicknames: Laskar Gunung Arang (Mount Charcoal Warriors)
- Founded: 1952; 74 years ago
- Ground: Ombilin Stadium
- Capacity: 5,000
- Owner: Askot PSSI Sawahlunto
- Chairman: Doni Asta
- Manager: Dedi Satria
- Coach: Jefri Anes
- League: Liga 4
- 2021: 4th in Group B, (West Sumatra zone)
- Website: http://gas.kotasawahlunto.com/
Home colours	Away colours	Third colours

PS GAS Sawahlunto stands for Persatuan Sepakbola Gunung Arang Sawahlunto (en: Football Association of Mount Charcoal Sawahlunto) is an Indonesian football club based in Sawahlunto, West Sumatra. They currently compete in the Liga 4 and play at Ombilin Stadium.

The team succeeded in promotion of Liga Indonesia Third Division 2011–2012 to the Liga Indonesia Second Division 2012-2013 but withdrew because of lack of funds to wade through the new season. Now, this club playing in Liga 4.

== Honours ==
- Liga Nusantara

Champion (1) West Sumatera: 2016
Runner up (2) West Sumatera; National Play Off: 2014

== Management ==
Position	Name
Chairman	(Indonesia) Doni Asta
Manager	(Indonesia) Deni Satria
Coach	(Indonesia) Jefri Anes
