= Jong Ambon F.C. =

Football club in Indonesia

Jong Ambon
- Full name: Jong Ambon Football Club
- Nickname: De Ambonezen
- Short name: JAFC
- Founded: 2020; 6 years ago
- Ground: Mandala Remaja Stadium; Ambon, Maluku
- Capacity: 20,000
- Owner: Yayasan Nanaku Sombar Maluku
- President: Rhony Sapulette
- Manager: Kelly Keliombar
- Coach: Ghofar Lestaluhu
- League: Liga 4
- Website: www.jongambonfc.com
Home colours	Away colours

Jong Ambon Football Club (simply known as Jong Ambon or JAFC) is an Indonesian football club based in Ambon, Maluku. They currently compete in the Liga 3.
