= Gaswa Wajo =

Association football team in Indonesia

- Full name: Gabungan Sepak Bola Wajo
- Nickname: Laskar Lamadukelleng
- Short name: Gaswa
- Founded: 1960; 66 years ago
- Ground: Andi Ninnong Stadium; Wajo Regency, South Sulawesi
- Owner: Askab PSSI Wajo
- Chairman: H. Irfan Saputra
- Manager: Syarifuddin
- Coach: Muhammad Gusri Damar Ulang
- League: Liga 3
- 2021: 4th in First Round of Group E, (South Sulawesi zone)
Home colours	Away colours

Gabungan Sepak Bola Wajo (simply known as Gaswa Wajo) is an Indonesian football club based in Wajo Regency, South Sulawesi. They currently compete in the Liga 3.
