= Persilatama Takengon =

Association football club in Indonesia

- Full name: Persatuan Sepakbola Indonesia Laut Tawar Utama Takengon
- Nicknames: Laskar Gajah Putih (White Elephant Warriors)
- Founded: 2006; 20 years ago
- Ground: Musara Alun Stadium; Takengon, Central Aceh, Aceh
- Owner: PSSI Central Aceh
- Chairman: Juliandi Saputra
- Manager: Musriadi
- Coach: Mulya Saputra
- League: Liga 4
- 2019: Liga 3, eliminated in provincial stage play-off round
Home colours	Away colours

Persatuan Sepakbola Indonesia Laut Tawar Utama Takengon (simply known as Persilatama Takengon) is an Indonesian football club based in Takengon, Central Aceh Regency, Aceh. They currently compete in the Liga 4 Aceh zone and their homeground is Musara Alun Stadium.
