= Persibu Ibu =

Association football team in Indonesia

Persibu
- Full name: Persatuan Sepakbola Ibu
- Nickname: Laskar Gamkonora
- Founded: 1982; 44 years ago
- Ground: Togulu Malamo Stadium; West Halmahera, North Maluku
- Owner: PSSI West Halmahera
- Chairman: Julius Marau
- Manager: Merry James Uang
- Coach: Iksan Sania
- League: Liga 4
- 2021: Liga 3, group stage (North Maluku zone)
Home colours	Away colours

Persatuan Sepakbola Ibu (simply known as Persibu) is an Indonesian football club based in West Halmahera Regency, North Maluku. They currently compete in the Liga 4 North Maluku zone.

== Honours ==
- Liga 3 North Maluku
  - Runner-up (1): 2019
