= Tulehu United F.C. =

Indonesian football club

Tulehu United
- Full name: Tulehu United Football Club
- Nickname(s): Laskar Haturesi (Haturesi Warriors)
- Short name: TUFC
- Founded: 2021; 4 years ago
- Dissolved: 2024; 1 year ago (merged with FC Pare)
- Ground: Matawaru Field; Tulehu, Central Maluku Regency
- Owner: PSSI Central Maluku
- Coach: Harmain Masaila
- League: Liga 3
- 2021: 3rd, (Maluku zone)
Home colours	Away colours

Tulehu United Football Club was an Indonesian football club based in Tulehu, Central Maluku Regency, Maluku, that competes in Liga 3. They were play their home match at Matawaru Field.
