= Persigowa Gowa =

Indonesian football club

Persigowa
- Full name: Persatuan Sepakbola Indonesia Gowa
- Nicknames: Serindit Sulawesi; Laskar Punggawa
- Short name: Persigowa
- Founded: 1960; 66 years ago
- Ground: Kalegowa Stadium; Gowa, South Sulawesi
- Capacity: 15,000
- Owner: Gowa Government
- Manager: Andi Lukman Daeng Naba
- Coach: Handi Hamzah
- League: Liga 4
- 2024–25: 4th, in Group B (South Sulawesi zone)
Home colours	Away colours

Persigowa (stands for Persatuan Sepakbola Indonesia Gowa) is an Indonesian football club based in Gowa, South Sulawesi, Indonesia. Persigowa currently play in Liga 4.

== Players ==
=== Current squad ===
As of 15 May 2022

Note: Flags indicate national team as defined under FIFA eligibility rules; some limited exceptions apply. Players may hold more than one non-FIFA nationality.

No.	Pos.	Nation	Player
1	GK	IDN	Ian Ardana
20	GK	IDN	Makmun Paruru
3	DF	IDN	Syaiful
4	DF	IDN	Ahmad Fiqri Zainal
5	DF	IDN	Arifin
15	DF	IDN	M. Ikhsan
21	DF	IDN	M. Irfan
23	DF	IDN	Celvin Saputra Boyan
22	DF	IDN	Lauhil Rizaldy
14	DF	IDN	Rian Anugrah
13	DF	IDN	Syahrul
24	DF	IDN	Andi Aksa

No.	Pos.	Nation	Player
19	MF	IDN	Owentianus Nouvic
16	MF	IDN	Hendra Sanjaya
10	MF	IDN	Fadel Muhammad
18	MF	IDN	Ali Imran Rahim
6	MF	IDN	M. Rezky
12	MF	IDN	M. Iksan
17	MF	IDN	Muh. Fahri
7	MF	IDN	Abdul Aziz
11	MF	IDN	Firdaus
2	MF	IDN	Muh. Fikri Haikal
25	FW	IDN	Misbahuddin Mustari
9	FW	IDN	Ryan Afryadi Akbar
