= Persega Galela =

Association football team in Indonesia

- Full name: Persatuan Sepakbola Galela
- Nickname: Laskar Sininga Moi
- Founded: 1980; 46 years ago
- Ground: Rajawali Stadium; Galela, North Halmahera, North Maluku
- Owner: Asprov PSSI Maluku Utara
- Chairman: Saifuddin Djuba
- Coach: Iskandar Ahmad
- League: Liga 4
- 2021: 3rd in Group A, (Liga 3 North Maluku zone)
Home colours	Away colours

Persatuan Sepakbola Galela (simply known as Persega Galela) is an Indonesian football club based in Galela, North Halmahera Regency, North Maluku. They currently compete in the Liga 4 North Maluku zone.
