= Kasintuwu Stadium =

Stadium in Central Sulawesi, Indonesia

- Location in Sulawesi
- Location: Poso, Poso Regency, Central Sulawesi, Indonesia
- Coordinates: 1.380847°S 120.760406°E
- Owner: Regency government of Poso
- Operator: Regency government of Poso
- Capacity: 3,000
- Surface: Grass field

Tenants
- Persipos Poso; Poso FC; PS Poso

Kasintuwu Stadium is a football stadium in the town of Poso, Indonesia. The stadium has a capacity of 3,000 people. The stadium was built in 1960 and is considered as one of the best stadiums in Central Sulawesi. It is the home base of Persipos Poso, Poso FC, and PS Poso.

On August 3, 2006, around 20:00 pm, a bomb exploded at the back of Kasintuwu Stadium, which is located right next to the General Hospital of Poso.
