= PSKPS Padangsidimpuan =

Indonesian football club

PSKPS
- Full name: Persatuan Sepakbola Kota Padang Sidimpuan
- Nickname: Salak Berduri
- Ground: Naposo Stadium
- Owner: Government of Padangsidimpuan City
- League: Liga 3
Home colours	Away colours

Persatuan Sepakbola Kota Padang Sidimpuan (simply known as PSKPS) is an Indonesian football club based in Padangsidimpuan, North Sumatra. This club competes in Liga 4 North Sumatra zone.

== Former players ==
- (Liberia) Peter Moukouri Kuoh
- (Mali) Moussa Keita
