= Persiori Supiori =

Indonesian football club

Persiori
- Full name: Persatuan Sepakbola Indonesia Supiori
- Nickname: Laskar Sorendiweri
- Founded: 2003; 23 years ago
- Ground: Sorendiweri Field; Supiori, Papua
- Owner: PSSI Supiori Regency
- League: Liga 4

Persatuan Sepakbola Indonesia Supiori (simply known as Persiori) is an Indonesian football club based in Supiori Regency, Papua. They currently compete in Liga 4 Papua zone.
