= Persigarsel South Garut =

Association football team in Indonesia

Persigarsel
- Full name: Persatuan Sepakbola Indonesia Garut Selatan
- Nickname: Laskar Sagara Kidul (South Sea Warriors)
- Founded: 2019; 7 years ago
- Dissolved: 2022; 4 years ago, replaced by Rancaekek
- Ground: Jayaraga Stadium; Garut, West Java
- Owner: Doni Murdyanto
- Chairman: Asep Rahmat
- Coach: Dadang
- League: Liga 3
- 2022: 3rd in Group G, (West Java zone series 2)
Home colours	Away colours

Persatuan Sepakbola Indonesia Garut Selatan (simply known as Persigarsel) was an Indonesian football club based in Garut Regency, West Java. They previously compete in the Liga 3.
