= PS Shark Tanjungpinang =

Indonesian football club

- Full name: Perkumpulan Sepakbola Shark Tanjungpinang
- Nickname: Hiu Biru (The Blue Shark)
- Founded: July 13, 2013; 12 years ago
- Ground: Antam Kijang Stadium; Tanjungpinang, Riau Islands
- Capacity: 5,000
- Owner: Ade Noverwin
- Chairman: Zulkarnain
- Coach: Bobby Pratama
- League: Liga 4
- 2023: 4th in Group A, (Riau Islands zone)
Home colours	Away colours

Perkumpulan Sepakbola Shark Tanjungpinang (simply known as PS Shark Tanjungpinang) is an Indonesian football club based in Tanjungpinang, Riau Islands. They currently compete in the Liga 4, in 2021, PS Shark Tanjungpinang has been registered as a member of the Provincial Association PSSI of Riau Islands (In Indonesian: Asprov PSSI Kepri).

== History ==
PS Shark Tanjungpinang was established on 13 July 2013, starting from a football club of village, currently starting their steps in the Liga 3 Riau Islands zone. they have been around since 2013. They was born and established as a soccer club under the name Shark FC, three years after the founding of the club, they won the regional cup for four consecutive years from 2016 to 2019.

On 26 November 2021, PS Shark Tanjungpinang made their first league match debut in a 2–1 loss against club from Batam 757 Kepri Jaya at the Sri Tri Buana Dompak Stadium. four days later, they qualified for the semi-finals of the Liga 3 Riau Islands zone as group A runner-up after their match won 5–3 over MBS United Batam. On 3 December 2021, they qualified for finals of the Liga 3 Riau Islands zone in a 2–3 win over Bintan Muda. but unsatisfactory results occurred in the final match a days later, they failed to champions in a 3–1 loss against 757 Kepri Jaya.

== Honours ==
- Liga 3 Riau Islands
  - Runner-up (1): 2021
