= Persipos Poso =

Indonesian football club

Persipos
- Full name: Persatuan Sepakbola Indonesia Poso
- Nickname: Harimau Poso
- Founded: 1959; 67 years ago
- Ground: Kasintuwu Stadium; Poso, Central Sulawesi
- Capacity: 3,000
- Owner: Poso Regency Government
- League: Liga 4
Home colours	Away colours

Persatuan Sepakbola Indonesia Poso (simply known as Persipos) is an Indonesian football club based in Poso Regency, Central Sulawesi. They currently compete in Liga 4 Central Sulawesi zone.

In September 2014, Persipos junior team won football branch at the 7th Games of Central Sulawesi Province, after beating Persipal Palu junior team in the final with a score of 4–1.
