= Kalegowa Stadium =

Multi-use stadium in Pallangga, South Sulawesi, Indonesia

- Location in Sulawesi
- Address: Jl. Poros Pallangga, Tetebatu, Pallangga, Gowa Regency, South Sulawesi
- Location: Pallangga, Gowa Regency, South Sulawesi, Indonesia
- Coordinates: 5.223580°S 119.444540°E
- Owner: Gowa Regency Government
- Operator: Yayasan Olahraga Fajar
- Surface: Grass field

Construction
- Renovated: 2018
- Closed: 2018

Tenant
- Persigowa Gowa

Kalegowa Stadium is a multi-use stadium in Pallangga, Gowa Regency, South Sulawesi, Indonesia. It is currently used mostly for football matches and is used as the home stadium for Persigowa Gowa
