= Tapanuli Atletik F.C. =

Indonesian football club in North Sumatra

Tapanuli Atletik
- Full name: Tapanuli Atletik Football Club
- Nicknames: Orangutan Tapanuli (The Tapanuli Orangutan)
- Short name: TATL
- Founded: 2018; 8 years ago
- Ground: Serbaguna Stadium; North Tapanuli, North Sumatra
- Capacity: 5,000
- Owner: Askab PSSI Tapanuli Utara
- Chairman: Frans Reynold Sihombing
- Manager: Frans Reynold Sihombing
- League: Liga 3
- 2021: 3rd in Group G, (North Sumatra zone)
Home colours	Away colours

Tapanuli Atletik Football Club (simply known as TATL or Tapanuli Atletik) is an Indonesian football club based in North Tapanuli Regency, North Sumatra. They currently compete in the Liga 3 and their homeground is Serbaguna Stadium.
