= Ombilin Stadium =

Football Stadium in West Sumatra

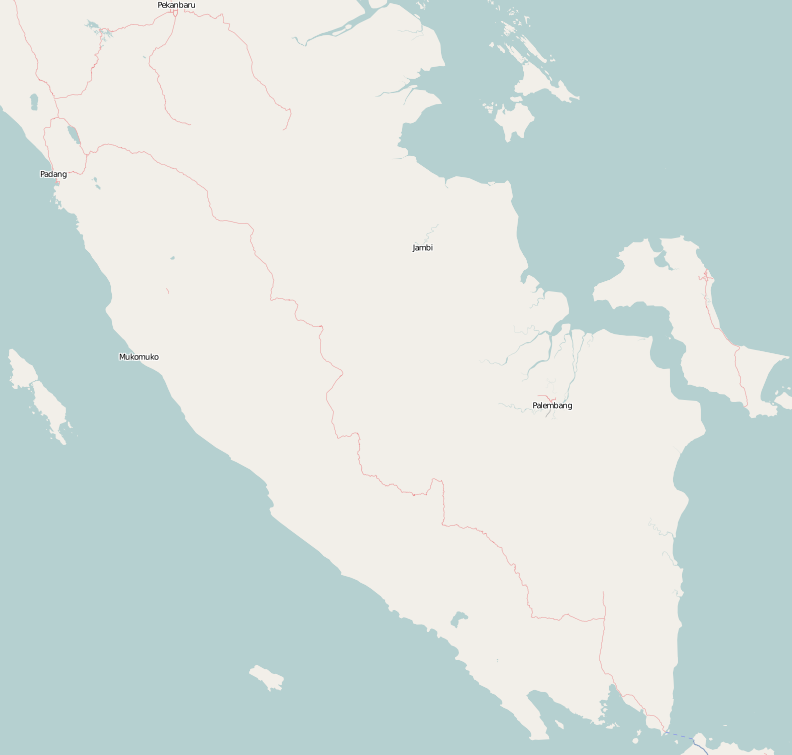
- Location in Southern Sumatra
- Location: Sawahlunto, West Sumatra, Indonesia
- Coordinates: 0.681639°S 100.778594°E
- Owner: Government of Sawahlunto City
- Operator: Government of Sawahlunto City
- Capacity: 5,000
- Surface: Grass field
- Field size: 100 x 70 m

Construction
- Built: 1901
- Renovated: 2002 and 2013

Tenant
- PS GAS Sawahlunto

Ombilin Stadium is a football stadium in Sawahlunto, West Sumatra. The stadium was built in 1901. It is currently used mostly for Football matches and is the home stadium of PS GAS Sawahlunto. Ombilin stadium has a seating capacity of 5,000. The stadium is managed by the Government of Sawahlunto, inside the stadium there is a grocery store.

Office radio Sawahlunto FM and offices Persatuan Wartawan Indonesia branch Sawahlunto is also present in this stadium complex.
