= PS Manokwari Selatan =

Indonesian football club

- Full name: Persatuan Sepakbola Manokwari Selatan
- Nickname: Mutiara Ransiki
- Short name: PS Mansel
- Ground: Garuda Football Field; Ransiki, South Manokwari
- Owner: PSSI South Manokwari
- Coach: Justus I. Swabra
- League: Liga 4
- 2024–25: Semi-finalist (West Papua zone)
Home colours

Persatuan Sepakbola Manokwari Selatan (simply known as PS Mansel) is an Indonesian football club based in South Manokwari Regency, West Papua. They currently compete in Liga 4 West Papua zone.

== History ==
PS Mansel participated in the first edition of the Liga 4 West Papua zone in the 2024–25 season, which was the first time they had participated in an official competition by the Football Association of Indonesia. The team qualified for the semi-finals from Group A as group winners with 3 wins and 1 loss. In the semi-final match against Manokwari United on 7 April 2025 at Sanggeng Stadium, they lost 0–1 and finished the competition as a semi-finalist.

== Sponsors ==
- Askab PSSI Manokwari Selatan
- SP Ransiki
