= Binatama Bupolo F.C. =

Association football team in Indonesia

Binatama Bupolo
- Full name: Binatama Bupolo Football Club Football Club
- Short name: BB; BBFC
- Founded: 2020; 6 years ago
- Ground: Manatahan Debowae Stadium; Buru Regency, Maluku
- Capacity: 5,000
- Owner: Asprov PSSI Maluku
- Coach: Ali Litiloly
- League: Liga 4
- 2021: 4th in Group B, (Liga 3 Maluku zone)
Home colours	Away colours

Binatama Bupolo Football Club (simply known as Binatama Bupolo) is an Indonesian football club based in Buru Regency, Maluku. They currently competes in Liga 4.
