= Poso F.C. =

Indonesian football club

- Full name: Poso Football Club
- Nickname: Poso Lions
- Ground: Kasintuwu Stadium; Poso, Central Sulawesi
- Capacity: 3,000
- Owner: Poso Regency Government
- Coach: Jentos
- League: Liga 3
- 2018: Group stage, (Central Sulawesi zone)
Home colours	Away colours

Poso Football Club, commonly known as Poso F.C. (also stylized as Poso FC), is an Indonesian football club based in Poso Regency, Central Sulawesi. Club played in Liga 3.

In September 2014, Poso F.C. was beaten by Persipal Palu with 3–0 score in the 2014 season of Nusantara League.

In September 2016, Poso F.C. back to participate in the 2016 season of Nusantara League as the representative of Poso Regency, along with PS Poso. Poso FC is placed in Group A. Their first game begins with a 3–0 victory against Persido Donggala, followed by a 1–1 draw against Persipal Palu, and ended with a 3–0 victory against Persipar Parigi.
