= PSAA Abulyatama =

Indonesian football club in Aceh

- Full name: Persatuan Sepakbola Abulyatama Aceh
- Nicknames: Laskar Abulyatama (Abulyatama Warriors); Pasukan Lampoh Keude (Lampoh Keude Force)
- Short name: PSAA
- Founded: 1989; 37 years ago
- Ground: Mini PSAA Stadium; Aceh Besar, Aceh
- Owner: University of Abulyatama
- Chairman: H. Rusli Bintang
- Coach: Wahyu A.W.
- League: Liga 4
- 2021: Quarter-finals, (Aceh zone)
Home colours	Away colours	Third colours

Persatuan Sepakbola Abulyatama Aceh (simply known as PSAA Abulyatama) is an Indonesian football club based in Aceh Besar Regency, Aceh. They currently compete in the Liga 4 and their homeground is Mini PSAA Stadium.
