= Dualipa F.C. =

Indonesian football club

Dualipa FC
- Full name: Paduan Sepakbola Limapuluh Kota dan Payakumbuh Football Club
- Founded: April 2021; 4 years ago
- Ground: Singa Harau Stadium; Lima Puluh Kota, West Sumatra
- Capacity: 10,000
- Owner: PSSI West Sumatra
- Chairman: Jhonny Sandadinata
- Manager: Hendrik
- Coach: Tomi Hendrianto
- League: Liga 4
- 2021: Quarter-finals, (West Sumatra zone)
Home colours	Away colours

Paduan Sepakbola Limapuluh Kota dan Payakumbuh Football Club (simply known as Dualipa FC) is an Indonesian football club based in Lima Puluh Kota Regency, West Sumatra. They currently compete in the Liga 4.

== History ==
Dualipa FC was established in April 2021, started as an amateur football club which was founded in early April. In fact, they have tiered age teams from U13, U15, U17, U18 to the senior team and women's team. In the senior team, they have played in various amateur tournaments in West Sumatra. The results were quite satisfactory, they won the Amphibi Cup and GMR Cup in Tanah Datar Regency.

Dualipa FC was founded on the thoughts of former local players who wanted to advance Lima Puluh Kota Regency and Payakumbuh. They then volunteered to Association Province of PSSI (Asprov PSSI) West Sumatra to become members as well as compete in Liga 3 and Soeratin Cup. They also have a unique story behind choosing a club name that resembles English singer and songwriter, Dua Lipa. Because this club is a combination of two regions, they thought of an abbreviated name that was appropriate and easy to understand. They are known to have been to make two name choices, namely Duapali FC and Dualipa FC, and they finally decided to use the name Dualipa FC as the club name.
