= Gemba F.C. =

Indonesian football club

Gemba
- Full name: Gemba Football Club
- Nickname: Kapitan Seram
- Founded: 2015; 11 years ago
- Ground: Kusuma Tani Stadium; Kairatu, West Seram
- Owner: PSSI West Seram
- Chairman: Agung Sritanoto
- Coach: Jasman Ramasukun
- League: Liga 4
- 2021: 2nd, (Liga 3 Maluku zone)
Home colours	Away colours

Gemba Football Club is an Indonesian football club based in Kairatu, West Seram, Maluku. They currently compete in Liga 4 Maluku zone.

== Honours ==
- Liga 3 Maluku
  - Runner-up (1): 2021
