= Tuanku Tambusai Stadium =

Football stadium in Indonesia

- Location in Riau
- Location: Bangkinang, Riau, Indonesia
- Coordinates: 0.3415°N 101.01737°E
- Capacity: 10,000
- Surface: Grass field

Tenants
- PSBS Bangkinang; PSPS Pekanbaru (temporary); KS Tiga Naga

Tuanku Tambusai Stadium is a football stadium in Bangkinang, Riau, Indonesia.

== History ==
The stadium is named after a national hero from the region Tuanku Tambusai.

== Other uses ==
PSBS Bangkinang use this stadium for their home games. For the 2013 Indonesia Super League season because of financial problems, PSPS Pekanbaru used this stadium as an alternative for using the largerRumbai Stadium.

It was also used as one of the venue for the 2012 Pekan Olahraga Nasional.
