= PSBS Bangkinang =

Indonesian football club

- Full name: Persatuan Sepakbola Bangkinang dan Sekitarnya
- Nickname: Dubalang Mudo Datuok Tabano
- Founded: 1959; 67 years ago
- Ground: Tuanku Tambusai Stadium, Kampar, Riau
- Capacity: 10,000
- Owner: Edwin Pratama Putra
- Chairman: Edwin Pratama Putra
- Manager: Dean Try Jerry
- Coach: Yuneldi Tanjung
- League: Liga 4
- 2021: 4th in Group A, (Riau zone)
Home colours	Away colours

Persatuan Sepakbola Bangkinang dan Sekitarnya (simply known as PSBS Bangkinang) is an Indonesian football club based in Kampar Regency, Riau. They currently compete in the Liga 4.
