= 2022 Liga 3 Banten =

Tournament details
- Country: Indonesia
- Dates: 30 September 2022 – 8 February 2023
- Teams: 21

Final positions
- Champions: Serpong City (1st title)
- Runners-up: Persikota Tangerang
- Third place: Adhyaksa Farmel
- Fourth place: Serang Jaya
- Qualified for: 2022 Liga 3 National Round

Tournament statistics
- Top goal scorer(s): Sehabudin Ahmad (26 goals)

The 2022 Liga 3 Banten is the seventh edition of Liga 3 Banten organized by Asprov PSSI Banten.

Followed by 21 clubs. The winner of this competition will immediately advance to the national round.

Persikota is the defending champion after winning it in the 2021 season.

== Teams ==
No	Team	Location
01	Nathan Lebak	Lebak Regency
02	Kanekes	Lebak Regency
03	Persipan	Pandeglang Regency
04	Anyar Pratama	Serang Regency
05	Raga Negeri	Serang Regency
06	Adhyaksa Farmel	Tangerang Regency
07	Matrix Putra Brother's	Tangerang Regency
08	Putra Tangerang	Tangerang Regency
09	Trisukma	Tangerang Regency
10	Persic	Cilegon
11	Persigon	Cilegon
12	Banten United	Serang
13	Internazionale Banten	Serang
14	Bantara	Serang
15	Serang Jaya	Serang
16	Banten Jaya	Serang
17	Persikota	Tangerang
18	Persitangsel	South Tangerang
19	Billal	South Tangerang
20	Serpong City	South Tangerang
21	Astam	South Tangerang

== Venues ==
- Krakatau Steel Stadium, Cilegon
- Maulana Yusuf Stadium, Serang

== First round ==
=== Group A ===
Pos	Team	Pld	W	D	L	GF	GA	GD	Pts	Qualification	FAR	RAG	MAT	NAT	BUN
1	Adhyaksa Farmel	4	4	0	0	35	0	+35	12	Advance to Knockout round	—	8–0	2–0	18–0	7–0
2	Raga Negeri	4	3	0	1	20	10	+10	9	Advance to Knockout round		—			
3	Matrix Putra Brother's	4	2	0	2	12	4	+8	6			1–2	—		
4	Nathan Lebak	4	1	0	3	6	28	−22	3			1–4	0–4	—	
5	Banten United	4	0	0	4	2	33	−31	0			0–14	0–7	2–5	—

Updated to match(es) played on unknown. Source: Liga 3 2022 Banten

=== Group B ===
Pos	Team	Pld	W	D	L	GF	GA	GD	Pts	Qualification	SJA	BSC	ANY
1	Serang Jaya	2	1	1	0	8	0	+8	4	Advance to Knockout round	—	0–0	8–0
2	Bantara	2	1	1	0	6	0	+6	4	Advance to Knockout round		—	6–0
3	Anyar Pratama	2	0	0	2	0	14	−14	0				—

Updated to match(es) played on unknown. Source: Liga 3 2022 Banten

=== Group C ===
Pos	Team	Pld	W	D	L	GF	GA	GD	Pts	Qualification	PTA	PPN	PSC	KKS	PUT
1	Persikota	4	4	0	0	12	0	+12	12	Advance to Knockout round	—	1–0	2–0	3–0	6–0
2	Persipan	4	2	1	1	14	2	+12	7	Advance to Knockout round		—		1–1	11–0
3	Persic	4	2	0	2	10	8	+2	6			0–2	—	4–2	6–2
4	Kanekes	4	1	1	2	8	8	0	4					—	5–0
5	Putra Tangerang	4	0	0	4	2	28	−26	0						—

Updated to match(es) played on unknown. Source: Liga 3 2022 Banten

=== Group D ===
Pos	Team	Pld	W	D	L	GF	GA	GD	Pts	Qualification	SER	AST	BJA	PGN	TRI
1	Serpong City	4	4	0	0	32	0	+32	12	Advance to Knockout round	—	8–0	6–0	10–0	8–0
2	Astam	4	3	0	1	7	8	−1	9	Advance to Knockout round		—		2–0	2–0
3	Banten Jaya	4	2	0	2	6	9	−3	6			0–3	—	1–0	5–0
4	Persigon	4	1	0	3	2	13	−11	3					—	2–0
5	Trisukma	4	0	0	4	0	17	−17	0						—

Updated to match(es) played on unknown. Source: Liga 3 2022 Banten

== Knockout round ==
=== Bracket ===
Quarter-finals
31 January – Cilegon
Serang Jaya	1
Astam	0
31 January – Cilegon
Serpong City	12
Bantara	1
30 January – Cilegon
Persikota	6
Raga Negeri	1
30 January – Cilegon
Adhyaksa Farmel	1
Persipan	0

Semi-finals
6 February – Cilegon
Serang Jaya	1
Serpong City	4
6 February – Cilegon
Persikota	1 (8)
Adhyaksa Farmel	1 (8)

Final
8 February – Cilegon
Serpong City	6
Persikota	3
Third place play-off
8 February – Cilegon
Serang Jaya	0
Adhyaksa Farmel	2

=== Quarter-finals ===
30 January 2023
13.00 WIB (UTC+7)

Persikota	6–1	Raga Negeri
Dana 5', 34', 64'; Tubagus 18', 38'; Hose 74'	Report	Galuh 23'

Krakatau Steel Stadium, Cilegon
Attendance: 0

30 January 2023
15.00 WIB (UTC+7)

Adhyaksa Farmel	1–0	Persipan
Sehabudin 27'	Report

Krakatau Steel Stadium, Cilegon
Attendance: 0

31 January 2023
13.00 WIB (UTC+7)

Serang Jaya	1–0	Astam
Dede Hantori 45+1'	Report

Krakatau Steel Stadium, Cilegon
Attendance: 0

31 January 2023
15.00 WIB (UTC+7)

Serpong City	12–1	Bantara
Umarella 1', 62', 68'; Aldino 4', 28', 34', 65'; Widar 45+1', 88'; Rivaldo 50'; Talaohu 75'; Made Tri 89'	Report	Sarmudi 64'

Krakatau Steel Stadium, Cilegon
Attendance: 0

=== Semi-finals ===
6 February 2023
13.00 WIB (UTC+7)

Serang Jaya	1–4	Serpong City
	Report

Krakatau Steel Stadium, Cilegon
Attendance: 0

6 February 2023
15.00 WIB (UTC+7)

Persikota	1–1	Adhyaksa Farmel
	Report
Penalties
	8–8

Krakatau Steel Stadium, Cilegon
Attendance: 0

Note: Penalty shootout has reached the last kicker but the result is still a draw. Then the referee draws lots to determine the winner of the match. As a result, Persikota was declared the winner.

=== Third place play-off ===
8 February 2023
08.00 WIB (UTC+7)

Serang Jaya	0–2	Adhyaksa Farmel
	Report

Krakatau Steel Stadium, Cilegon
Attendance: 0

=== Final ===
8 February 2023
14.00 WIB (UTC+7)

Serpong City	6–3	Persikota
	Report

Krakatau Steel Stadium, Cilegon
Attendance: 0
