= 2021 Liga 3 Banten =

Tournament details
- Dates: 30 October–1 December 2021
- Teams: 22

Final positions
- Champions: Persikota Tangerang (3rd title)
- Runners-up: Farmel
- Third place: Serpong City
- Fourth place: Matrix Putra Brother's

The 2021 Liga 3 Banten (also known as Liga 3 MS Glow For Men PSSI Banten for sponsorship reason) will be the sixth season of Liga 3 Banten as a qualifying round for the national round of the 2021–22 Liga 3.

Persikota Tangerang were the defending champion.

== Teams ==
There are 22 teams participated in the league this season.

Team	Location
Anyar Pratama	Serang Regency
Astam	South Tangerang
Bantara	Serang
Banten Jaya	Serang
Banten United	Serang
Billal	South Tangerang
Bintang Junior	South Tangerang
Farmel	Tangerang Regency
Gundala	Serang
Harin	South Tangerang
Jagat	Cilegon
Matrix Putra Brother's	Tangerang Regency
Mavericks	Pandeglang
Persic Cilegon	Cilegon
Persigon Cilegon	Cilegon
Persikota Tangerang	Tangerang
Persipan Pandeglang	Pandeglang
Persitangsel South Tangerang	South Tangerang
Putra Tangerang	Tangerang Regency
Sam's Soccer	South Tangerang
Serang Jaya	Serang
Serpong City	South Tangerang

== First round ==
=== Group A ===
Pos	Team	Pld	W	D	L	GF	GA	GD	Pts	Qualification
1	Persikota	5	4	1	0	19	2	+17	13	Advanced to Second round
2	Persipan	5	3	2	0	14	1	+13	11	Advanced to Second round
3	Mavericks	5	3	1	1	13	3	+10	10	
4	Astam	5	1	1	3	5	12	−7	4	
5	Bantara	5	1	1	3	5	17	−12	4	
6	Sam's	5	0	0	5	4	25	−21	0	

Updated to match(es) played on 17 November 2021. Source: Liga 3 2021 Banten

=== Group B ===
Pos	Team	Pld	W	D	L	GF	GA	GD	Pts	Qualification
1	Matrix Putra Brother's	4	3	1	0	14	3	+11	10	Advanced to Second round
2	Harin	4	2	2	0	6	2	+4	8	Advanced to Second round
3	Persigon	4	2	1	1	13	6	+7	7	
4	Anyar Pratama	4	1	0	3	6	10	−4	3	
5	Banten United	4	0	0	4	3	21	−18	0	

Updated to match(es) played on 13 November 2021. Source: Liga 3 2021 Banten

=== Group C ===
Pos	Team	Pld	W	D	L	GF	GA	GD	Pts	Qualification
1	Farmel	5	4	1	0	26	3	+23	13	Advanced to Second round
2	Serpong City	5	4	0	1	25	6	+19	12	Advanced to Second round
3	Jagat	5	3	1	1	13	7	+6	10	
4	Banten Jaya	5	2	0	3	20	8	+12	6	
5	Bintang Junior	5	1	0	4	7	29	−22	3	
6	Gundala	5	0	0	5	2	40	−38	0	

Updated to match(es) played on 17 November 2021. Source: Liga 3 2021 Banten

=== Group D ===
Pos	Team	Pld	W	D	L	GF	GA	GD	Pts	Qualification
1	Serang Jaya	4	4	0	0	10	1	+9	12	Advanced to Second round
2	Persic	4	3	0	1	9	2	+7	9	Advanced to Second round
3	Persitangsel	4	2	0	2	11	4	+7	6	
4	Billal	4	1	0	3	6	9	−3	3	
5	Putra Tangerang	4	0	0	4	3	23	−20	0	

Updated to match(es) played on 13 November 2021. Source: Liga 3 2021 Banten

== Second round ==
=== Group E ===
Pos	Team	Pld	W	D	L	GF	GA	GD	Pts	Qualification
1	Farmel	3	3	0	0	8	1	+7	9	Advanced to the Semi final
2	Persikota	3	2	0	1	7	1	+6	6	Advanced to the Semi final
3	Persic	3	1	0	2	3	9	−6	3	
4	Harin	3	0	0	3	1	8	−7	0	

Updated to match(es) played on 24 November 2021. Source: Liga 3 2021 Banten

=== Grup F ===
Pos	Team	Pld	W	D	L	GF	GA	GD	Pts	Qualification
1	Serpong City	3	2	1	0	6	1	+5	7	Advanced to the Semi final
2	Matrix Putra Brother's	3	1	1	1	1	1	0	4	Advanced to the Semi final
3	Persipan	3	1	0	2	3	5	−2	3	
4	Serang Jaya	3	1	0	2	3	6	−3	3	

Updated to match(es) played on 25 November 2021. Source: Liga 3 2021 Banten

== Knockout stage ==
Semi-finals
E1	Farmel	3
F2	Matrix Putra Brother's	1
F1	Serpong City	0 (4)
E2	Persikota Tangerang	0 (5)

Finals
Farmel	1 (3)
Persikota Tangerang	1 (4)
Third place
Serpong City	2
Matrix Putra Brother's	1

=== Semi-finals ===
November 28, 2021
13.00 UTC+7

Farmel	3–1	Matrix Putra Brother's
	Report

Krakatau Steel Stadium, Cilegon

November 28, 2021
15.30 UTC+7

Serpong City	0–0 (4–5 pen.)	Persikota Tangerang
	Report

Krakatau Steel Stadium, Cilegon

=== Third place play-off ===
November 30, 2021
13.30 UTC+7

Serpong City	2–1	Matrix Putra Brother's
	Report

Krakatau Steel Stadium, Cilegon

=== Finals ===
December 1, 2021
13.30 UTC+7

Farmel	1–1 (3–4)	Persikota Tangerang
	Report

Krakatau Steel Stadium, Cilegon
