= 2025–26 Liga 4 Banten =

Liga 4 Banten
- Season: 2025–26
- Dates: 29 March 2026 – 11 April 2026
- Champions: Nathan Lebak
- Runner up: Harin
- National phase: Nathan Lebak; Harin
- Matches: 26
- Goals: 139 (5.35 per match)
- Biggest win: Billal 17–0 Putra Tangerang (4 April 2026)

The 2025–26 Liga 4 Banten (officially known as the 2025–26 Liga 4 Banten Governor's Cup or Liga 4 Piala Gubernur Banten 2025–26) is the second season of the fourth-tier football competition in Indonesia organized by the Provincial Association (Asprov) of PSSI Banten. The competition is scheduled to kick off on 29 March 2026.

== Background ==
Tangerang City has been appointed as the host for the tournament, with the Benteng Reborn Stadium and Heroik Stadium serving as the central venues. A total of 14 clubs were confirmed to participate after the registration and administrative verification process. During the PSSI Banten Congress on 23 November 2025, the association ratified the name and domicile change of Sam's Soccer Club (formerly based in South Tangerang) to Bayu Bangun Persada (BBP) Putra Wonogiri, now based in Tangerang Regency. A Technical Meeting and Match Coordination Meeting (MCM) are scheduled for 12 March 2026.

== Teams ==
The 2025–26 Liga 4 Banten (Governor's Cup) officially featured 14 competing teams, with the registration and administrative verification concluding in early March 2026. The tournament was centered at the Benteng Reborn Stadium in Tangerang and Heroik Stadium in Serang, which served as the primary venues, where these clubs vied for champion.

=== Location map ===
Locations of teams competing in the 2025–26 Liga 4 Banten:
- Lebak (Regency): Nathan Lebak, Persira
- Serang (City): Banten Jaya, Bantara
- South Tangerang (City): Harin, Serpong City, Billal
- Tangerang (Regency): Matrix Putra Brother's, Putra Tangerang, Trisukma, BBP Putra Wonogiri, Sanggeni Purnama

=== Participating teams ===
No	Team	Location	2024–25 season^{†}
1	Persic	Cilegon	champions
2	Nathan Lebak	Lebak Regency	third place
3	Persira	Lebak Regency	did not participate
4	Banten Jaya	Serang (City)	did not participate
5	Bantara	Serang (City)	quarter-finalist
6	Banten United	Serang Regency	regional phase
7	Harin	South Tangerang	runners-up
8	Serpong City	South Tangerang	quarter-finalist
9	Billal	South Tangerang	regional phase
10	Matrix Putra Brother's	Tangerang Regency	quarter-finalist
11	Putra Tangerang	Tangerang Regency	regional phase
12	Trisukma	Tangerang Regency	regional phase
13	BBP Putra Wonogiri (†)	Tangerang Regency	did not participate
14	Sanggeni Purnama	Tangerang Regency	did not participate

^{†} Results from the 2024–25 Liga 4 Banten. BBP Putra Wonogiri previously competed as Sam's Soccer Club.

== Venues ==
Matches are primarily held at the central host venues:

- Benteng Reborn Stadium, Tangerang
- Heroik Stadium, Serang

== Group stage ==
The group stage of the 2025–26 Liga 4 Banten features 14 participating teams divided into four groups. The tournament follows a single round-robin format, where the top two teams from each group will advance to the knockout stage.

=== Group A ===
All matches in Group A are played at the Benteng Reborn Stadium, Tangerang.

Pos	Team	Pld	W	D	L	GF	GA	GD	Pts	Qualification	HAR	MPB	BIL	PTG
1	Harin	3	2	1	0	13	1	+12	7	Qualification to knockout stage	—	—	—	11–0
2	Matrix Putra Brother's	3	2	0	1	12	3	+9	6	Qualification to knockout stage	0–1	—	6–1	—
3	Billal	3	1	1	1	19	7	+12	4		1–1	—	—	17–0
4	Putra Tangerang	3	0	0	3	1	34	−33	0		—	1–6	—	—

Source: Liga 4 Banten

=== Group B ===
All matches in Group B are played at the Benteng Reborn Stadium, Tangerang.

Pos	Team	Pld	W	D	L	GF	GA	GD	Pts	Qualification	BBP	SGP	SPC
1	BBP Putra Wonogiri	2	2	0	0	9	1	+8	6	Qualification to knockout stage	—	—	4–0
2	Sanggeni Purnama	2	1	0	1	6	8	−2	3	Qualification to knockout stage	1–5	—	—
3	Serpong City	2	0	0	2	3	9	−6	0		—	3–5	—

Source: Liga 4 Banten

=== Group C ===
All matches in Group C are played at the Heroik Stadium, Serang.

Pos	Team	Pld	W	D	L	GF	GA	GD	Pts	Qualification	NLB	SIC	BJA	TRI
1	Nathan Lebak	3	2	1	0	18	1	+17	7	Qualification to knockout stage	—	3–0	—	14–0
2	Persic	3	2	0	1	11	5	+6	6	Qualification to knockout stage	—	—	—	7–1
3	Banten Jaya	3	1	1	1	7	5	+2	4		1–1	0–4	—	—
4	Trisukma	3	0	0	3	1	26	−25	0		—	—	0–5	—

Source: Liga 4 Banten

=== Group D ===
All matches in Group D are played at the Heroik Stadium, Serang.

Pos	Team	Pld	W	D	L	GF	GA	GD	Pts	Qualification	BUT	BAN	PRA
1	Banten United	2	1	1	0	1	0	+1	4	Qualification to knockout stage	—	—	0–0
2	Bantara	2	1	0	1	4	2	+2	3	Qualification to knockout stage	0–1	—	—
3	Persira	2	0	1	1	1	4	−3	1		—	1–4	—

Source: Liga 4 Banten

== Knockout stage ==
=== Bracket ===
Quarter-finals
6 April 2026 — Benteng Reborn, Tangerang
A1	Harin	3
C2	Persic	2
7 April 2026 — Benteng Reborn, Tangerang
B1	BBP Putra Wonogiri	6
D2	Bantara	0
6 April 2026 — Benteng Reborn, Tangerang
C1	Nathan Lebak	2
A2	Matrix Putra Brother's	1
7 April 2026 — Benteng Reborn, Tangerang
D1	Banten United	3
B2	Sanggeni Purnama	6

Semi-finals
9 April 2026 — Benteng Reborn, Tangerang
Harin	2 (4)
BBP Putra Wonogiri	2 (3)
9 April 2026 — Benteng Reborn, Tangerang
Nathan Lebak	3
Sanggeni Purnama	0

Final
11 April 2026 — Benteng Reborn, Tangerang
Harin	0
Nathan Lebak	1
Third-place play-off
10 April 2026 — Benteng Reborn, Tangerang
BBP Putra Wonogiri	3
Sanggeni Purnama	0

=== Knockout matches ===
Quarter-finals (6–7 April 2026)

=== Quarter-finals ===
6 April 2026
13:00 WIB (UTC+7)

Harin	3–2	Persic
A. Maruf 48'; A. Rahman 48', 79'	Report	22' R. Almiqdaad; 83' J. Putra

Benteng Reborn Stadium, Tangerang
6 April 2025
15:15 WIB (UTC+7)

Nathan Lebak	2–1	Matrix Putra Brother's
A. Rohim 18'; Gilang W.P. 35'	Report	14' A. Al Achya

Benteng Reborn Stadium, Tangerang
7 April 2026
13:00 WIB (UTC+7)

BBP Putra Wonogiri	6–0	Bantara
Arif Y.R. 14', 21', 59'; S.A. Tacchinardi 17'; A. Wardiansyah 79'; D.P. Ardiansyah 83'	Report

Benteng Reborn Stadium, Tangerang
7 April 2026
15:15 WIB (UTC+7)

Banten United	3–6	Sanggeni Purnama
Rifqi R.S. 48'; R.K. Putra 66'; T.I. Maulana 72'	Report	5' A. Ferdinan; 17' M. Devin D.S.; 34' M. Fahry F.; 42' I. Pramana; 61', 80' Sumarna

Benteng Reborn Stadium, Tangerang

Semi-finals (9 April 2026)

=== Semi-finals ===
9 April 2026
13:00 WIB (UTC+7)

Harin	2–2	BBP Putra Wonogiri
Novriadi 56'; A. Rahman 90+7'	Report	10' S.A. Tacchinardi; 77' J. Kurniawan
Penalties
	4–3

Benteng Reborn Stadium, Tangerang
9 April 2026
15:15 WIB (UTC+7)

Nathan Lebak	3–0	Sanggeni Purnama
A. Rohim 5', 58'; S. Arvani 69'	Report

Benteng Reborn Stadium, Tangerang

3rd place and Final (10–11 April 2026)

=== Third-place play-off ===
10 April 2026
15:00 WIB (UTC+7)

BBP Putra Wonogiri	3–0	Sanggeni Purnama
S.A. Tacchinardi 59'; Andriyan 70', 85'	Report

Benteng Reborn Stadium, Tangerang

=== Final ===
11 April 2026
15:00 WIB (UTC+7)

Harin	0–1	Nathan Lebak
	Report	13' S. Arvani

Benteng Reborn Stadium, Tangerang

== See also ==
- 2025–26 Liga 4
- 2025–26 Liga 4 Jakarta
- 2025–26 Liga 4 West Java Series 1
- 2025–26 Liga 4 West Java Series 2
- 2025–26 Liga 4 Central Java
- 2025–26 Liga 4 Special Region of Yogyakarta
- 2025–26 Liga 4 East Java
