= Doni Adriansyah =

Indonesian footballer

Personal information
- Full name: Doni Adriansyah
- Date of birth: 22 November 2001 (age 24)
- Place of birth: Cimahi, Indonesia
- Height: 1.72 m (5 ft 8 in)
- Position: Defender

Youth career
- 2017: PSGC Ciamis
- 2019: PSKC Cimahi

Senior career*
Years	Team	Apps	(Gls)
2021–2022	Persikabo 1973	2	(0)
2022–2023	Serpong City	1	(0)
- * Club domestic league appearances and goals as of 22 January 2023

Doni Adriansyah (born 22 November 2001) is an Indonesian professional footballer who plays as a defender.

== Club career ==
=== Persikabo 1973 ===
He was signed for Persikabo 1973 to play in the Liga 1 in the 2021 season. Doni made his league debut on 3 February 2022 in a match against Bali United at the Ngurah Rai Stadium, Denpasar.

=== Serpong City ===
He was signed for Serpong City to play in the Liga 3 in the 2022–23 season. Doni made his Liga 3 debut on 22 January 2023 in a 10–0 win against Persigon Cilegon at the Krakatau Steel Stadium, Cilegon.

== Career statistics ==
=== Club ===
As of 7 February 2022.

Club	Season	League			Cup		Continental		Other		Total	
Club	Season	Division	Apps	Goals	Apps	Goals	Apps	Goals	Apps	Goals	Apps	Goals
Persikabo 1973	2021	Liga 1	2	0	0	0	–		0	0	2	0
Serpong City	2022–23	Liga 3	1	0	0	0	–		0	0	1	0
Career total			3	0	0	0	0	0	0	0	3	0

== Honours ==
=== Club ===
Serpong City

- Liga 3: 2022
