= 2023 Liga 3 Banten =

Tournament details
- Country: Indonesia
- Dates: 8 – 31 October 2023
- Teams: 17

Final positions
- Champions: Adhyaksa Farmel (1st title)
- Runners-up: Persikota
- Third place: Persic
- Fourth place: Persipan
- Qualified for: 2023–24 Liga 3 National Phase

The 2023 Liga 3 Banten is the eighth edition of Liga 3 Banten organized by Asprov PSSI Banten.

Followed by 17 clubs. The finalist and third-place winner of this competition will immediately advance to the national round.

Serpong City is the defending champion after winning it in the 2022 season.

Adhyaksa Farmel clinch their first title after beating Persikota in final.

== Teams ==
| No | Team | Location |
|---|---|---|
| 1 | Duta | Lebak Regency |
| 2 | Kanekes | Lebak Regency |
| 3 | Nathan Lebak | Lebak Regency |
| 4 | Persira | Lebak Regency |
| 5 | Mavericks | Pandeglang Regency |
| 6 | Persipan | Pandeglang Regency |
| 7 | Raga Negeri | Serang Regency |
| 8 | Adhyaksa Farmel | Tangerang Regency |
| 9 | Matrix Putra Brother's | Tangerang Regency |
| 10 | Putra Tangerang | Tangerang Regency |
| 11 | Trisukma | Tangerang Regency |
| 12 | Persic | Cilegon |
| 13 | Gundala | Serang |
| 14 | Serang Jaya | Serang |
| 15 | Persikota | Tangerang |
| 16 | Harin | South Tangerang |
| 17 | Serpong City | South Tangerang |

== Venues ==
- Trimatra Kodiklat TNI Serpong Stadium, South Tangerang

== Group stage ==
A total of 17 teams will be drawn into 4 groups. The group stage will be played in single round-robin matches.

=== Group A ===
| Pos | Team | Pld | W | D | L | GF | GA | GD | Pts | Qualification | NAT | SRP | GUN | HAR | TRI |
|---|---|---|---|---|---|---|---|---|---|---|---|---|---|---|---|
| 1 | Nathan Lebak | 4 | 3 | 1 | 0 | 21 | 2 | +19 | 10 | Advance to the Knockout Stage | — | 2–2 | | | 12–0 |
| 2 | Serpong City | 4 | 3 | 1 | 0 | 18 | 3 | +15 | 10 | Advance to the Knockout Stage | | — | | 3–0 | |
| 3 | Gundala | 4 | 2 | 0 | 2 | 13 | 9 | +4 | 6 | | 0–4 | 1–3 | — | 4–2 | |
| 4 | Harin | 4 | 1 | 0 | 3 | 10 | 11 | −1 | 3 | | 0–3 | | | — | 8–1 |
| 5 | Trisukma | 4 | 0 | 0 | 4 | 1 | 38 | −37 | 0 | | | 0–10 | 0–8 | | — |

Updated to match(es) played on 24 October 2023. Source: Liga 3 Banten 2023

=== Group B ===
| Pos | Team | Pld | W | D | L | GF | GA | GD | Pts | Qualification | PKT | PSC | MAV | DUT |
|---|---|---|---|---|---|---|---|---|---|---|---|---|---|---|
| 1 | Persikota | 3 | 3 | 0 | 0 | 11 | 1 | +10 | 9 | Advance to the Knockout Stage | — | | 2–0 | |
| 2 | Persic | 3 | 2 | 0 | 1 | 8 | 6 | +2 | 6 | Advance to the Knockout Stage | 1–3 | — | | 4–1 |
| 3 | Mavericks | 3 | 0 | 1 | 2 | 3 | 6 | −3 | 1 | | | 2–3 | — | 1–1 |
| 4 | Duta | 3 | 0 | 1 | 2 | 2 | 11 | −9 | 1 | | 0–6 | | | — |

Updated to match(es) played on 19 October 2023. Source: Liga 3 Banten 2023

=== Group C ===
| Pos | Team | Pld | W | D | L | GF | GA | GD | Pts | Qualification | FAR | PPN | RAG | KKS |
|---|---|---|---|---|---|---|---|---|---|---|---|---|---|---|
| 1 | Adhyaksa Farmel | 3 | 2 | 1 | 0 | 9 | 4 | +5 | 7 | Advance to the Knockout Stage | — | 2–2 | 3–1 | |
| 2 | Persipan | 3 | 2 | 1 | 0 | 7 | 4 | +3 | 7 | Advance to the Knockout Stage | | — | 2–0 | 3–2 |
| 3 | Raga Negeri | 3 | 1 | 0 | 2 | 3 | 5 | −2 | 3 | | | | — | 2–0 |
| 4 | Kanekes | 3 | 0 | 0 | 3 | 3 | 9 | −6 | 0 | | 1–4 | | | — |

Updated to match(es) played on 19 October 2023. Source: Liga 3 Banten 2023

=== Group D ===
| Pos | Team | Pld | W | D | L | GF | GA | GD | Pts | Qualification | SJY | PRA | MPB | PTR |
|---|---|---|---|---|---|---|---|---|---|---|---|---|---|---|
| 1 | Serang Jaya | 3 | 3 | 0 | 0 | 16 | 0 | +16 | 9 | Advance to the Knockout Stage | — | 4–0 | | 10–0 |
| 2 | Persira | 3 | 1 | 1 | 1 | 11 | 5 | +6 | 4 | Advance to the Knockout Stage | | — | 1–1 | |
| 3 | Matrix Putra Brother's | 3 | 1 | 1 | 1 | 8 | 4 | +4 | 4 | | 0–2 | | — | |
| 4 | Putra Tangerang | 3 | 0 | 0 | 3 | 1 | 27 | −26 | 0 | | | 0–10 | 1–7 | — |

Updated to match(es) played on 20 October 2023. Source: Liga 3 Banten 2023

== Knockout stage ==
In the knockout round, the 8 teams that advanced from group stage will play in a single-legged knockout format.

=== Bracket ===
Quarter-finals
26 October – South Tangerang
Persikota | 3
Persira | 0
26 October – South Tangerang
Serang Jaya | 1
Persic | 2
27 October – South Tangerang
Nathan Lebak | 0
Persipan | 1
27 October – South Tangerang
Adhyaksa Farmel | 4
Serpong City | 2

Semi-finals
29 October – South Tangerang
Persikota | 2
Persic | 0
29 October – South Tangerang
Persipan | 0
Adhyaksa Farmel | 2

Final
31 October – South Tangerang
Persikota | 1
Adhyaksa Farmel | 2
Third place play-off
31 October – South Tangerang
Persic | 1
Persipan | 0

=== Quarter-finals ===
26 October 2023
13.00 WIB (UTC+7)

| Persikota | 3–0 | Persira |
|---|---|---|
| | Report |

Trimatra Kodiklat TNI Serpong Stadium, South Tangerang

26 October 2023
15.00 WIB (UTC+7)

| Serang Jaya | 1–2 | Persic |
|---|---|---|
| | Report |

Trimatra Kodiklat TNI Serpong Stadium, South Tangerang

27 October 2023
13.00 WIB (UTC+7)

| Adhyaksa Farmel | 4–2 | Serpong City |
|---|---|---|
| | Report |

Trimatra Kodiklat TNI Serpong Stadium, South Tangerang

27 October 2023
15.00 WIB (UTC+7)

| Nathan Lebak | 0–1 | Persipan |
|---|---|---|
| | Report |

Trimatra Kodiklat TNI Serpong Stadium, South Tangerang

=== Semi-finals ===
29 October 2023
13.00 WIB (UTC+7)

| Persikota | 2–0 | Persic |
|---|---|---|
| | Report |

Trimatra Kodiklat TNI Serpong Stadium, South Tangerang

29 October 2023
15.00 WIB (UTC+7)

| Persipan | 0–2 | Adhyaksa Farmel |
|---|---|---|
| | Report |

Trimatra Kodiklat TNI Serpong Stadium, South Tangerang

=== Third place play-off ===
31 October 2023
13.00 WIB (UTC+7)

| Persic | 1–0 | Persipan |
|---|---|---|
| | Report |

Trimatra Kodiklat TNI Serpong Stadium, South Tangerang

=== Final ===
31 October 2023
15.00 WIB (UTC+7)

| Persikota | 1–2 | Adhyaksa Farmel |
|---|---|---|
| | Report |

Trimatra Kodiklat TNI Serpong Stadium, South Tangerang

== Qualification to the national phase ==
| Team | Method of qualification | Date of qualification | Qualified to |
|---|---|---|---|
| Adhyaksa Farmel | 2023 Liga 3 Banten champions | 31 October 2023 | 2023–24 Liga 3 National Phase |
| Persikota | 2023 Liga 3 Banten runner-up | 31 October 2023 | 2023–24 Liga 3 National Phase |
| Persic | 2023 Liga 3 Banten third place | 31 October 2023 | 2023–24 Liga 3 National Phase |

== See also ==
- 2023 Liga 3 National Phase
- 2023 Liga 3 Jakarta
