= 2019 Soeratin Cup =

Tournament details
- Country: Indonesia

The 2019 Soeratin Cup season is the 17th season of Soeratin Cup national round, an official football tournament which is intended for footballers under the age of seventeen and fifteen held by PSSI. The qualifying round already held in 2018.

== Under-17 ==
Soeratin Cup U17
Tournament details
- Dates: 27 January – 9 February 2019
- Teams: 32

Final positions
- Champions: Persebaya U17
- Runner-up: Persipan U17
- Third place: Persikabo U17
- Fourth place: Bali United U17

Tournament statistics
- Matches played: 64
- Goals scored: 245 (3.83 per match)
- Top goal scorer(s): Taufik Hidayat (8 goals)

Awards
- Best player: Dicky Kurniawan Arifin
- Goals scored in penalty shoot-outs not included.

The national round of Soeratin Cup U17 held in Malang Regency and Blitar. Matches are held in Gelora Brantas Stadium and Kusuma Agrowisata Stadium in Batu, Paskhas Stadium and Arhanud Stadium in Malang, and also Gelora Supriyadi Stadium in Blitar for third place and final. Thirty-two teams from each provincial association competed. The round began on 27 January 2019 and finished with a final on 9 February 2019.

PKN Penajam Utama U17 from East Kalimantan were the defending champions. But they were eliminated in the group stage.

Persebaya U17 from East Java won the title, defeating Persipan U17 2–0 in the final.

=== Teams ===
#	Province	Teams
Sumatra Region
1	Aceh	Kuala Nanggroe U17
2	North Sumatra	Binjai United U17
3	West Sumatra	PSP Padang U17
4	Riau	KS Tiga Naga U17
5	Riau Islands	—
6	Jambi	Bungo Putra U17
7	South Sumatra	PS Palembang U17
8	Bangka Belitung Islands	PS Basel U17
9	Bengkulu	PS Seluma U17
10	Lampung	Persilat Central Lampung U17
Java Region
11	Banten	Persipan Pandeglang U17
12	Jakarta	Urakan U17
13	West Java	Persikabo Bogor U17
14	Central Java	BJL 2000 U17
15	Special Region of Yogyakarta	—
16	East Java	Persebaya Surabaya U17
Lesser Sunda Islands Region
17	Bali	Bali United U17
18	West Nusa Tenggara	PSKT West Sumbawa U17
19	East Nusa Tenggara	Perseftim East Flores U17

#	Province	Teams
Kalimantan Region
20	West Kalimantan	Persilan Landak U17
21	Central Kalimantan	Persepar Garuda U17
22	South Kalimantan	Peseban Banjarmasin U17
23	East Kalimantan	PKN Penajam Utama U17
24	North Kalimantan	Kaltara U17
Sulawesi Region
25	North Sulawesi	Bolsel U17
26	Central Sulawesi	Persido Donggala U17
27	South Sulawesi	Persigowa Gowa U17
28	Southeast Sulawesi	PS North Kolaka U17
29	Gorontalo	PS Boalemo U17
30	West Sulawesi	PS Sandeq U17
Maluku Region
31	(Maluku (province)) Maluku	Pelauw Putra U17
32	North Maluku	Persihaltim East Halmahera U17
Papua Region
33	(West Papua (province)) West Papua	Persikos Sorong U17
34	(Papua (province)) Papua	Persimer Merauke U17

=== Group stage ===
==== Group 1 ====
Pos	Team	Pld	W	D	L	GF	GA	GD	Pts	Qualification
1	Persebaya U17s	3	3	0	0	19	1	+18	9	Advance to round of 16
2	Persikos U17s	3	2	0	1	7	9	−2	6	Advance to round of 16
3	Persido U17s	3	0	1	2	3	7	−4	1	
4	Peseban U17s	3	0	1	2	2	14	−12	1	

Source: PSSI
Rules for classification: 1) points; 2) goal difference; 3) number of goals scored.

==== Group 2 ====
Pos	Team	Pld	W	D	L	GF	GA	GD	Pts	Qualification
1	BJL 2000 U17s	3	2	1	0	9	4	+5	7	Advance to round of 16
2	PSP U17s	3	1	2	0	5	4	+1	5	Advance to round of 16
3	Urakan U17s	3	1	1	1	3	3	0	4	
4	PS Seluma U17s	3	0	0	3	0	6	−6	0	

Source: PSSI
Rules for classification: 1) points; 2) goal difference; 3) number of goals scored.

==== Group 3 ====
Pos	Team	Pld	W	D	L	GF	GA	GD	Pts	Qualification
1	Bali United U17s	3	2	1	0	8	4	+4	7	Advance to round of 16
2	Persigowa U17s	3	2	0	1	9	8	+1	6	Advance to round of 16
3	Persimer U17s	3	1	0	2	2	4	−2	3	
4	PSKT West Sumbawa U17s	3	0	1	2	5	8	−3	1	

Source: PSSI
Rules for classification: 1) points; 2) goal difference; 3) number of goals scored.

==== Group 4 ====
Pos	Team	Pld	W	D	L	GF	GA	GD	Pts	Qualification
1	PS Palembang U17s	3	3	0	0	11	2	+9	9	Advance to round of 16
2	Bolsel U17s	3	2	0	1	6	4	+2	6	Advance to round of 16
3	Kaltara U17s	3	1	0	2	3	5	−2	3	
4	Kuala Nanggroe U17s	3	0	0	3	0	9	−9	0	

Source: PSSI
Rules for classification: 1) points; 2) goal difference; 3) number of goals scored.

==== Group 5 ====
Pos	Team	Pld	W	D	L	GF	GA	GD	Pts	Qualification
1	Binjai United U17s	3	3	0	0	8	1	+7	9	Advance to round of 16
2	Pelauw Putra U17s	3	2	0	1	3	3	0	6	Advance to round of 16
3	Persilan U17s	3	1	0	2	3	6	−3	3	
4	Bungo Putra U17s	3	0	0	3	1	5	−4	0	

Source: PSSI
Rules for classification: 1) points; 2) goal difference; 3) number of goals scored.

==== Group 6 ====
Pos	Team	Pld	W	D	L	GF	GA	GD	Pts	Qualification
1	Persihaltim U17s	3	3	0	0	9	1	+8	9	Advance to round of 16
2	Persikabo U17s	3	2	0	1	8	4	+4	6	Advance to round of 16
3	Persilat U17s	3	1	0	2	3	6	−3	3	
4	PS Boalemo U17s	3	0	0	3	3	12	−9	0	

Source: PSSI
Rules for classification: 1) points; 2) goal difference; 3) number of goals scored.

==== Group 7 ====
Pos	Team	Pld	W	D	L	GF	GA	GD	Pts	Qualification
1	Tiga Naga U17s	3	1	2	0	8	5	+3	5	Advance to round of 16
2	PS Sandeq Polman U17s	3	1	2	0	7	6	+1	5	Advance to round of 16
3	PKN Penajam Utama U17s	3	0	3	0	5	5	0	3	
4	Persepar Garuda U17s	3	0	1	2	4	8	−4	1	

Source: PSSI
Rules for classification: 1) points; 2) goal difference; 3) number of goals scored.

==== Group 8 ====
Pos	Team	Pld	W	D	L	GF	GA	GD	Pts	Qualification
1	Persipan U17s	3	3	0	0	15	3	+12	9	Advance to round of 16
2	PS Basel U17s	3	2	0	1	12	9	+3	6	Advance to round of 16
3	Perseftim U17s	3	1	0	2	4	9	−5	3	
4	PS North Kolaka U17s	3	0	0	3	3	13	−10	0	

Source: PSSI
Rules for classification: 1) points; 2) goal difference; 3) number of goals scored.

=== Knockout stage ===
Round of 16
3 February – Batu
Persebaya U17s	3
PSP U17s	0
3 February – Batu
PS Palembang U17s	0
Persigowa U17s	2
3 February – Batu
Bali United U17s (pen.)	1 (7)
Bolsel U17s	1 (6)
3 February – Batu
BJL 2000 U17s	4
Persikos U17s	0
3 February – Malang
Binjai United U17s	0 (4)
Persikabo U17s (pen.)	0 (5)
3 February – Malang
Tiga Naga U17s	1
PS Basel U17s	0
3 February – Malang
Persipan U17s	3
PS Sandeq Polman U17s	0
3 February – Malang
Persihaltim U17s	2
Pelauw Putra U17s	1

Quarter-finals
5 February – Batu
Persebaya U17s (pen.)	1 (4)
Persigowa U17s	1 (3)
5 February – Batu
Bali United U17s	2
BJL 2000 U17s	1
5 February – Malang
Persikabo U17s	4
Tiga Naga U17s	2
5 February – Malang
Persipan U17s	7
Persihaltim U17s	6

Semi-finals
7 February – Malang
Persebaya U17s	5
Bali United U17s	0
7 February – Malang
Persikabo U17s	1
Persipan U17s	3

Final
9 February – Blitar
Persebaya U17s	2
Persipan U17s	0
Third place
9 February – Blitar
Bali United U17s	2 (3)
Persikabo U17s (pen.)	2 (4)

==== Round of 16 ====
3 February 2019
Persebaya U17s (East Java)	3–0	(West Sumatra) PSP U17s	Gelora Brantas Stadium, Batu
PS Palembang U17s (South Sumatra)	0–2	(South Sulawesi) Persigowa U17s	Kusuma Agrowisata Stadium, Batu
Bali United U17s	1–1 (7–6 p)	(North Sulawesi) Bolsel U17s	Kusuma Agrowisata Stadium, Batu
BJL 2000 U17s (Central Java)	4–0	(West Papua (province)) Persikos U17s	Gelora Brantas Stadium, Batu
Binjai United U17s (North Sumatra)	0–0 (4–5 p)	(West Java) Persikabo U17s	Paskhas Stadium, Malang
Tiga Naga U17s (Riau)	1–0	(Bangka Belitung Islands) PS Basel U17s	Arhanud Stadium, Malang
Persipan U17s (Banten)	3–0	(West Sulawesi) PS Sandeq Polman U17s	Arhanud Stadium, Malang
Persihaltim U17s (North Maluku)	2–1	(Maluku (province)) Pelauw Putra U17s	Paskhas Stadium, Malang

==== Quarter-finals ====
5 February 2019
Persebaya U17s (East Java)	1–1 (4–3 p)	(South Sulawesi) Persigowa U17s	Gelora Brantas Stadium, Batu
Bali United U17s	2–1	(Central Java) BJL 2000 U17s	Gelora Brantas Stadium, Batu
Persikabo U17s (West Java)	4–2	(Riau) Tiga Naga U17s	Paskhas Stadium, Malang
Persipan U17s (Banten)	7–6	(North Maluku) Persihaltim U17s	Paskhas Stadium, Malang

==== Semi-finals ====
7 February 2019
Persebaya U17s (East Java)	5–0	Bali United U17s	Paskhas Stadium, Malang
Persikabo U17s (West Java)	1–3	(Banten) Persipan U17s	Paskhas Stadium, Malang

==== Third place ====
9 February 2019
Bali United U17s	2–2 (3–4 p)	(West Java) Persikabo U17s	Gelora Supriyadi Stadium, Blitar

==== Final ====
9 February 2019
Persebaya U17s (East Java)	2–0	(Banten) Persipan U17s	Gelora Supriyadi Stadium, Blitar

== Under-15 ==
Soeratin Cup U15
Tournament details
- Dates: 27 January – 7 February 2019
- Teams: 21

Final positions
- Champions: SSB All Star Rahuning U15
- Runner-up: Persis U15
- Third place: Persikomet U15
- Fourth place: PS Badung U15

Tournament statistics
- Matches played: 26
- Goals scored: 105 (4.04 per match)
- Top goal scorer(s): Ardi Ardiana (6 goals)

Awards
- Best player: Arkhan Fikri
- Goals scored in penalty shoot-outs not included.

The national round of Soeratin Cup U15 held in Blitar Regency. Matches were held in Gelora Supriyadi Stadium and Gelora Bumi Penataran Stadium. Twenty-one teams from each provincial association was planned to compete. But before the tournament start, three teams withdrew, leaving only 18 teams competed. The round began on 27 January 2019 and finished with a final on 7 February 2019.

Askot Bandung from West Java were the defending champions, but they could not defend their title because they did not qualify for the national round.

SSB All Star Rahuning U15 from North Sumatra won the title, defeating Persis U15 2–1 after extra time.

=== Teams ===
#	Province	Teams
Sumatra Region
1	Aceh	—
2	North Sumatra	SSB All Star Rahuning U15
3	West Sumatra	Taruna Mandiri U15
4	Riau	KS Tiga Naga U15
5	Riau Islands	—
6	Jambi	Batanghari U15
7	South Sumatra	PS PALI U15
8	Bangka Belitung Islands	PS Banteng U15
9	Bengkulu	Tunas Muda U15
10	Lampung	Persikomet Metro U15
Java Region
11	Banten	Persitangsel South Tangerang U15
12	Jakarta	Trisakti U15
13	West Java	UNI Bandung U15
14	Central Java	Persis Solo U15
15	Special Region of Yogyakarta	—
16	East Java	PSBK Blitar U15
Lesser Sunda Islands Region
17	Bali	PS Badung U15
18	West Nusa Tenggara	Satya U15
19	East Nusa Tenggara	—

#	Province	Teams
Kalimantan Region
20	West Kalimantan	—
21	Central Kalimantan	Polsek Selat U15
22	South Kalimantan	Peseban Banjarmasin U15
23	East Kalimantan	—
24	North Kalimantan	Kaltara U15
Sulawesi Region
25	North Sulawesi	—
26	Central Sulawesi	—
27	South Sulawesi	—
28	Southeast Sulawesi	—
29	Gorontalo	—
30	West Sulawesi	SSB Mitra Manakara U15
Maluku Region
31	(Maluku (province)) Maluku	Nusaina U15
32	North Maluku	—
Papua Region
33	(West Papua (province)) West Papua	Persisos U15
34	(Papua (province)) Papua	—

=== Group stage ===
==== Group 1 ====
Pos	Team	Pld	W	D	L	GF	GA	GD	Pts	Qualification
1	PSBK U15	2	2	0	0	6	2	+4	6	Advance to quarter-finals
2	SSB Mitra Manakara U15	2	1	0	1	8	3	+5	3	
3	Batanghari U15	2	0	0	2	0	9	−9	0	
4	Polsek Selat U15	0	0	0	0	0	0	0	0	Withdrew

Source: PSSI
Rules for classification: 1) points; 2) goal difference; 3) number of goals scored.

==== Group 2 ====
Pos	Team	Pld	W	D	L	GF	GA	GD	Pts	Qualification
1	Persikomet U15	2	1	0	1	3	2	+1	3	Advance to quarter-finals
2	Satya U15	2	1	0	1	3	2	+1	3	
3	Peseban U15	2	1	0	1	2	4	−2	3	
4	Tunas Muda U15	0	0	0	0	0	0	0	0	Withdrew

Source: PSSI
Rules for classification: 1) points; 2) goal difference; 3) number of goals scored.

==== Group 3 ====
Pos	Team	Pld	W	D	L	GF	GA	GD	Pts	Qualification
1	SSB All Star Rahuning U15	3	3	0	0	12	1	+11	9	Advance to quarter-finals
2	Trisakti U15	3	2	0	1	3	3	0	6	Advance to quarter-finals
3	Nusaina U15	3	1	0	2	2	6	−4	3	
4	PS PALI U15	3	0	0	3	0	7	−7	0	

Source: PSSI
Rules for classification: 1) points; 2) goal difference; 3) number of goals scored.

==== Group 4 ====
Pos	Team	Pld	W	D	L	GF	GA	GD	Pts	Qualification
1	PS Banteng U15	1	1	0	0	5	1	+4	3	Advance to quarter-finals
2	Kaltara U15	1	0	0	1	1	5	−4	0	
3	Taruna Mandiri U15	0	0	0	0	0	0	0	0	Withdrew

Source: PSSI
Rules for classification: 1) points; 2) goal difference; 3) number of goals scored.

==== Group 5 ====
Pos	Team	Pld	W	D	L	GF	GA	GD	Pts	Qualification
1	Persis U15	2	0	2	0	4	4	0	2	Advance to quarter-finals
2	UNI Bandung U15	2	0	2	0	4	4	0	2	
3	Persitangsel U15	2	0	2	0	2	2	0	2	

Source: PSSI
Rules for classification: 1) points; 2) goal difference; 3) number of goals scored.

==== Group 6 ====
Pos	Team	Pld	W	D	L	GF	GA	GD	Pts	Qualification
1	PS Badung U15	2	2	0	0	14	1	+13	6	Advance to quarter-finals
2	KS Tiga Naga U15	2	1	0	1	10	3	+7	3	Advance to quarter-finals
3	Persisos U15	2	0	0	2	1	21	−20	0	

Source: PSSI
Rules for classification: 1) points; 2) goal difference; 3) number of goals scored.

=== Knockout stage ===
Quarter-finals
3 February – Blitar
PSBK U15	1
Persikomet U15s	3
3 February – Blitar
SSB All Star Rahuning U15	4
KS Tiga Naga U15	2
3 February – Blitar
Persis U15	2
Trisakti U15	0
3 February – Blitar
PS Badung U15	1
PS Banteng U15	0

Semi-finals
5 February – Blitar
Persikomet U15	0
SSB All Star Rahuning U15	3
5 February – Blitar
Persis U15	3
PS Badung U15	1

Final
7 February – Blitar
SSB All Star Rahuning U15 (a.e.t.)	2
Persis U15	1
Third place
7 February – Blitar
Persikomet U15	2
PS Badung U15	0

==== Quarter-finals ====
3 February 2019
PSBK U15 (East Java)	1–3	(Lampung) Persikomet U15	Gelora Supriyadi Stadium, Blitar
SSB All Star Rahuning U15 (North Sumatra)	4–2	(Riau) KS Tiga Naga U15	Gelora Bumi Penataran Stadium, Blitar
Persis U15 (Central Java)	2–0	(Jakarta) Trisakti U15	Gelora Supriyadi Stadium, Blitar
PS Badung U15 (Bali)	1–0	(Bangka Belitung Islands) PS Banteng U15	Gelora Bumi Penataran Stadium, Blitar

==== Semi-finals ====
5 February 2019
Persikomet U15 (Lampung)	0–3	(North Sumatra) SSB All Star Rahuning U15	Gelora Supriyadi Stadium, Blitar
Persis U15 (Central Java)	3–1	(Bali) PS Badung U15	Gelora Supriyadi Stadium, Blitar

==== Third place ====
7 February 2019
Persikomet U15 (Lampung)	2–0	(Bali) PS Badung U15	Gelora Supriyadi Stadium, Blitar

==== Final ====
7 February 2019
SSB All Star Rahuning U15 (North Sumatra)	2–1 (a.e.t.)	(Central Java) Persis U15	Gelora Supriyadi Stadium, Blitar

== See also ==
- 2019 Liga 1
- 2019 Liga 2
- 2019 Liga 3
- 2018–19 Piala Indonesia
