= Harin F.C. =

Indonesian football club

Harin
- Full name: Harimau Indonesia Football Club
- Nickname: The Tigers
- Short name: HFC
- Founded: 2020; 6 years ago
- Ground: Harin Sport Arena; Pondok Cabe Udik, Pamulang, South Tangerang
- Owner: Muzammil Andriansyah
- Head coach: Lebry Hidayatullah
- League: Liga 4
- 2024–25: 2nd (Banten Zone); Second round, 3rd in Group R (National phase)
Home colours	Away colours

Harimau Indonesia Football Club, commonly known as Harin, is an Indonesian football club based in Pamulang, South Tangerang, Banten. They currently compete in Liga 4 Banten zone.

== History ==
Since the 2023–24 season, Harin FC collaborated with the Muhammadiyah University of Jakarta and competed in Liga 3 Banten with the name Harin UMJ FC used for commercial purposes, while for administrative purposes registered with PSSI, the name Harin FC remains.

In that season, Harin FC was included in Group A with Gundala, Nathan Lebak, Serpong City, and Trisukma where Harin FC finished in fourth place with three points from four matches.

In the 2024-25 season, Harin FC was included in Group D with Raga Negeri and Persitangsel and finished as group champions. The best achievement in that season was finishing as runner-up after losing to Persic. Even so, Harin FC qualified for the national phase as Banten's representative in that phase.

== Honours ==
- Liga 4 Banten
  - Runners-up (2): 2024–25, 2025–26
- U13 Soeratin Cup
  - Third-place (1): 2022

== Performance by seasons ==
Season	Competition	Round	Province	Team	Score	Result
2023	2023 Liga 3 Banten	Group stage	(Banten)	Serpong City	3–0	4th
2023	2023 Liga 3 Banten	Group stage	(Banten)	Trisukma	1–8	4th
2023	2023 Liga 3 Banten	Group stage	(Banten)	Gundala	4–2	4th
2023	2023 Liga 3 Banten	Group stage	(Banten)	Nathan Lebak	3–0	4th
2024–25	2024–25 Liga 4 Banten	Group stage	(Banten)	Raga Negeri	1–0	1st
2024–25	2024–25 Liga 4 Banten	Group stage	(Banten)	Persitangsel	2–0	1st
2024–25	2024–25 Liga 4 Banten	Quarter-finals	(Banten)	Bantara	2–1	Runner-up
2024–25	2024–25 Liga 4 Banten	Semi-finals	(Banten)	Jagat	1–1 (Note: Draw after extra time, then won by penalty shoot-out 2–4.)	Runner-up
2024–25	2024–25 Liga 4 Banten	Final	(Banten)	Persic	3–0	Runner-up
2024–25	2024–25 Liga 4 national phase	First round	(Central Java)	Persip	2–0	2nd
2024–25	2024–25 Liga 4 national phase	First round	(Jambi)	Persebri	2–0	2nd
2024–25	2024–25 Liga 4 national phase	First round	(Special Region of Yogyakarta)	PS HW UMY	0–1	2nd
2024–25	2024–25 Liga 4 national phase	Second round	(Banten)	Persic	1–1	3rd
2024–25	2024–25 Liga 4 national phase	Second round	(West Java)	Cimahi United	1–2	3rd
2024–25	2024–25 Liga 4 national phase	Second round	(Central Java)	Persibat	3–2	3rd
