= Sirvi Arvani =

Indonesian footballer

Personal information
- Full name: Sirvi Arvani
- Date of birth: 11 February 1992 (age 34)
- Place of birth: Serang, Indonesia
- Height: 1.72 m (5 ft 8 in)
- Position: Forward

Team information
- Current team: Nathan Lebak
- Number: 10

Youth career
- 2005–2010: Persita Tangerang
- 2011: Perserang Serang

Senior career*
Years	Team	Apps	(Gls)
2011–2014	Persita Tangerang	51	(12)
2015	Persepam Madura Utama	0	(0)
2016–2024	Persita Tangerang	78	(26)
2021	→ RANS Cilegon (loan)	9	(2)
2024–2025	Persikota Tangerang	21	(9)
2026–	Nathan Lebak		
- * Club domestic league appearances and goals as of 22:10, 10 February 2025 (UTC)

Sirvi Arvani (born 11 February 1992) is an Indonesian professional footballer who plays as a forward for Liga 4 club Nathan Lebak.

== Club career ==
=== Persita Tangerang ===
He was signed for Persita Tangerang to play in Premier Division in the 2011–12 season. Arvani made his first-team debut on 10 January 2011 in a match against PS Bengkulu and scored his first goal for Persita in a 0–1 win over Persip Pekalongan. Until the end of the season, he successfully brought his team promotion to the Indonesia Super League even though in the final match lose over Barito Putera.

On 19 January 2013, Arvani made his first Indonesia Super League appearance in Persita's starting XI in a 1–1 draw with Persipura Jayapura at the Mashud Wisnusaputra Stadium, Kuningan Regency. He scored his first Super League goal of the 2013 season on 13 February 2013, scored a brace in a 3–1 home win over Persiba Balikpapan. He scored his goal on 27 April 2013, an equaliser in a 3–1 away lose over Persela Lamongan.

On 5 February 2014, Arvani scored his first goal of the 2014 season, scoring in a 2–1 lose over Persib Bandung at the Jalak Harupat Stadium, Bandung Regency. On 4 May 2014, Arfani scored a brace in a 4–0 home win to Persijap Jepara.

=== Persepam Madura United ===
In January 2015, he signed with Persepam Madura United. However, he is not making any appearances for his current club due to this season was officially discontinued by PSSI on 2 May 2015 due to a ban by Imam Nahrawi, Minister of Youth and Sports, against PSSI to run any football competition.

=== Return to Persita Tangerang ===
In early 2017, Arvani decided to re-join former club Persita Tangerang. Arvani scored his first league goal in the 2017 Liga 2 for Persita in a 2–0 win over Persika Karawang.

He scored his first Liga 2 goal of the 2018 season on 10 August 2018, coming on as a substitute in a 1–2 away win over Cilegon United.

On 23 June 2019, Arvani made his Liga 2 appearance in a match against PSGC Ciamis and then scored his first goal for the club in the injury time. On 2 July 2019, Arvani scored a hat-trick during a 4–0 win over Persibat Batang. with this result, he is listed as the first hat-trick in 2019 Liga 2. Arvani finished the season as leading Liga 2 goalscorer, with 14 goals, two ahead of Persiraja Banda Aceh striker Assanur Rijal in second and also successfully brought his team back to promotion to the Liga 1.

Arvani made his league debut on 6 March 2020 in new season 2020 Liga 1, coming on as a substitute for Samsul Arif in a 1–1 draw against PSM Makassar. And then, This season was suspended on 27 March 2020 due to the COVID-19 pandemic. The season was abandoned and was declared void on 20 January 2021. Arvani made his new season league debut on 28 August 2021 in a match against Persipura Jayapura at the Pakansari Stadium where he coming as a substitute for Ahmad Nur Hardianto.

==== Loan to RANS Cilegon ====
On 22 September 2021, Arvani joined RANS Cilegon on loan from Persita Tangerang for the 2021–22 season. Arvani made his Liga 2 debut for RANS on 28 September 2021, and scoring his first goal for the club against Dewa United.

=== Nathan Lebak ===
In 2026, he officially joined Liga 4 club Nathan Lebak, from Lebak Regency, Banten. He played for the club in the 2025–26 season of the Liga 4 Banten zone competition, qualifying for the provincial phase to play in the national phase. In the semi-finals, Arvani managed to score 1 goal in the 69th minute in a match that ended in Nathan Lebak's victory with a score of 3–0 over Sanggeni Purnama at the Benteng Reborn Stadium, Tangerang. He scored again in the final match, In the 13th minute, the match ended 1–0 with Nathan Lebak winning over Harin. With this result, Arvani won the 2025–26 Liga 4 Banten championship title with the club.

== Honours ==
=== Club ===
Persita Tangerang

- Liga 2 runner-up: 2019

RANS Cilegon

- Liga 2 runner-up: 2021

Nathan Lebak

- Liga 4 Banten champion: 2025–26

=== Individual ===
- Liga 2 Top Goalscorer: 2019
