= Kevin Armedyah =

Indonesian footballer

Personal information
- Full name: Kevin Armedyah Nur Erwihas
- Date of birth: 7 February 2001 (age 25)
- Place of birth: Binjai, Indonesia
- Height: 1.72 m (5 ft 8 in)
- Position: Attacking midfielder

Youth career
- 2018–2019: Binjai United
- 2019–2020: PON Sumut

Senior career*
Years	Team	Apps	(Gls)
2021–2022	Karo United	5	(0)
2022–2023	PSMS Medan	3	(0)
2023–2025	Arema	2	(0)
2023–2024	→ Sada Sumut (loan)	12	(0)
2024	→ Persekat Tegal (loan)	3	(0)
2024–2025	→ Sumut United (loan)	13	(1)
2025	Unaaha	10	(0)
- * Club domestic league appearances and goals

Kevin Armedyah Nur Erwihas (born 7 February 2001) is an Indonesian professional footballer who plays as an attacking midfielder.

== Early life ==
Armedyah was born in Binjai, he started his football career at Binjai United. Then, he had time to strengthen Karo United at the Liga 2. In 2022, he signed for PSMS Medan. He left PSMS Medan in late 2022.

== Club career ==
=== Arema ===
Armedyah joined a Liga 1 club Arema at 21 January 2023 after trialing. He made his Liga 1 debut for the club, in a 0–0 draw against Dewa United on 10 March 2023.

==== Sada Sumut (loan) ====
On 11 July 2023, Kevin joined Liga 2 club Sada Sumut on loan.

== Honours ==
Sumut United

- Liga Nusantara: 2024–25
