= 2024–25 Liga 4 Banten =

Liga 4 Banten
- Season: 2024–25
- Dates: 2–19 February 2025
- Champions: Persic (1st title)
- National phase: Persic; Harin
- Matches: 29
- Goals: 95 (3.28 per match)
- Biggest win: Nathan Lebak 5–0 Duta (4 February 2025); Billal 0–5 Serpong City (6 February 2025); Persigon 0–5 Nathan Lebak (8 February 2025)
- Highest scoring: Banten United 6–2 Billal (3 February 2025)

The 2024–25 Liga 4 Banten was the inaugural season of Liga 4 Banten after the change in the structure of Indonesian football competition and serves as a qualifying round for the national phase of the 2024–25 Liga 4. The competition is organised by the Banten Provincial PSSI Association.

== Teams ==
A total of 15 teams are competing in this season.

=== Teams changes ===
The following teams changed division after the 2023–24 season.

▲ Promoted to Liga 2
- Adhyaksa
- Persikota

=== Participating teams ===
No	Team	Location	2023 season
1	Jagat	Cilegon City	—
2	Persic	Cilegon City	Third place
3	Persigon	Cilegon City	—
4	Bantara	Serang City	—
5	Banten United	Serang City	—
6	Raga Negeri	Serang Regency	First round (3rd in Group C)
7	Matrix Putra Brother's	Tangerang Regency	First round (3rd in Group D)
8	Putra Tangerang	Tangerang Regency	First round (4th in Group D)
9	Trisukma	Tangerang Regency	First round (5th in Group A)
10	Billal	South Tangerang City	—
11	Harin	South Tangerang City	First round (4th in Group A)
12	Persitangsel	South Tangerang City	—
13	Serpong City	South Tangerang City	Quarter-finalist
14	Duta	Lebak Regency	First round (4th in Group B)
15	Nathan Lebak	Lebak Regency	Quarter-finalist

=== Personnel and kits ===
Note: Flags indicate national team as has been defined under FIFA eligibility rules. Players and coaches may hold more than one non-FIFA nationality.

Team	Head coach	Captain	Kit manufacturer	Main kit sponsor	Other kit sponsor(s)
Bantara			(Indonesia) McCloth	None	List: Front: None; Back: None; Sleeves: None; Shorts: None
Banten United			(Indonesia) Geoners	Rumah Makan Wong Kudus	List: Front: Geoners; Back: Sleeves: Shorts:
Billal			(Indonesia) Made by club	None	List: Front: Back: Sleeves: Shorts:
Duta			(Indonesia) DSI^{1}	Duta FC	List: Front: 2Madison, Gelora Printing, PT Tunasdaya Mustika; Back: Sleeves: Shorts:
Harin			(Indonesia) Made by club	Djava	List: Front: Laris Food Court, Universitas Muhammadiyah Jakarta; Back: Sleeves: Shorts:
Jagat		(Indonesia) Asep Mario	(Indonesia) XCollabs	None (Matchday 1 only) / Multiusaha Handitama (Matchday 2 onwards)	List: Front: None; Back: None; Sleeves: None; Shorts: None
Matrix Putra Brother's			(Indonesia) Kavta	Agam Türkiye	List: Front: BigsGall; Back: None; Sleeves: None; Shorts: None
Nathan Lebak	(Indonesia) Asri Akbar		(Indonesia) Nathan Apparel^{1}	Bayu Bangun Persada	List: Front: DOOgether, Mabolindo; Back: Omah Bakso BBP Wonogiri; Sleeves: None; Shorts: None
Persic	(Indonesia) Hariyadi Puthul	(Indonesia) Azat Sudrajat	(Indonesia) XMET Sport	Jagat Baratama	List: Front: None; Back: None; Sleeves: None; Shorts: None
Persigon					List: Front: Back: Sleeves: Shorts:
Persitangsel	(Indonesia) Bayu Iswadi	(Indonesia) Nurhidayat Noer	(Indonesia) Ways	None (Matchday 1) / PT Artha Jaya Laksana (Matchday 2)	List: Front: None; Back: None; Sleeves: None; Shorts: None
Putra Tangerang	(Indonesia) Rinci Gustiawan	(Indonesia) Kosmus Inyomusi	(Indonesia) Made by club	Rhadik Football Academy	List: Front: Back: Sleeves: Shorts:
Raga Negeri	(Indonesia) Selfianus Jakob	(Indonesia) Muhammad Nabiq Muntas	(Indonesia) Ghanior	Sedasa	List: Front: None; Back: Raga Negeri; Sleeves: None; Shorts: None
Serpong City			(Indonesia) Calma	None	List: Front: None; Back: None; Sleeves: None; Shorts: None
Trisukma				Tri Sukma	List: Front: Back: Sleeves: Shorts:

Notes:

1. Apparel made by club.

== Schedule ==
The schedule of the competition is as follows.

Stage	Matchday	Date
Group stage	Matchday 1	2–5 February 2025
Group stage	Matchday 2	6–9 February 2025
Group stage	Matchday 3	9–12 February 2025
Knockout stage	Quarter-finals	14–15 February 2025
Knockout stage	Semi-finals	17 February 2025
Knockout stage	Third place play-off	19 February 2025
Knockout stage	Final	19 February 2025

== Group stage ==
The draw for the group stage took place on 29 January 2025 in Serang, where 15 teams were divided into four groups. The first round will be played in a home tournament format of single round-robin matches.

The top two teams of each group will qualify for the knockout stage.

=== Group A ===
All matches will be held at Heroic Group 1 Kopassus Stadium, Serang.

Pos	Team	Pld	W	D	L	GF	GA	GD	Pts	Qualification	MPB	SCI	BUN	BIL
1	Matrix Putra Brother's	3	2	1	0	4	2	+2	7	Qualification to the Knockout stage	—	—	0–0	—
2	Serpong City	3	2	0	1	10	2	+8	6	Qualification to the Knockout stage	1–2	—	—	—
3	Banten United	3	1	1	1	6	6	0	4		—	0–4	—	6–2
4	Billal	3	0	0	3	3	13	−10	0		1–2	0–5	—	—

Source: Liga 4 Banten
Rules for classification: 1) Points; 2) Head-to-head points; 3) Head-to-head goal difference; 4) Head-to-head goals scored; 5) Goal difference; 6) Goals scored; 7) Fair-play points; 8) Draw.

==== Group A Matches ====
Matchday 1 (3 February 2025)
3 February 2025
13:15 WIB (UTC+7)

Serpong City	1–2	Matrix Putra Brother's
	Report

Heroic Group 1 Kopassus Stadium, Serang
3 February 2025
15:30 WIB (UTC+7)

Banten United	6–2	Billal
	Report

Heroic Group 1 Kopassus Stadium, Serang

Matchday 2 (6 February 2025)
6 February 2025
13:15 WIB (UTC+7)

Billal	0–5	Serpong City
	Report

Heroic Group 1 Kopassus Stadium, Serang
6 February 2025
15:30 WIB (UTC+7)

Matrix Putra Brother's	0–0	Banten United
	Report

Heroic Group 1 Kopassus Stadium, Serang

Matchday 3 (9–10 February 2025)
9 February 2025
15:30 WIB (UTC+7)

Banten United	0–4	Serpong City
	Report

Heroic Group 1 Kopassus Stadium, Serang
10 February 2025
13:15 WIB (UTC+7)

Billal	1–2	Matrix Putra Brother's
	Report

Heroic Group 1 Kopassus Stadium, Serang

=== Group B ===
All matches will be held at Heroic Group 1 Kopassus Stadium, Serang.

Pos	Team	Pld	W	D	L	GF	GA	GD	Pts	Qualification	PSC	BSC	PTR	TRI
1	Persic	3	2	1	0	8	1	+7	7	Qualification to the Knockout stage	—	—	—	3–0
2	Bantara	3	1	2	0	1	0	+1	5	Qualification to the Knockout stage	0–0	—	—	—
3	Putra Tangerang	3	0	2	1	2	6	−4	2		1–5	0–0	—	—
4	Trisukma	3	0	1	2	1	5	−4	1		—	0–1	1–1	—

Source: Liga 4 Banten
Rules for classification: 1) Points; 2) Head-to-head points; 3) Head-to-head goal difference; 4) Head-to-head goals scored; 5) Goal difference; 6) Goals scored; 7) Fair-play points; 8) Draw.

==== Group B Matches ====
Matchday 1 (2 & 4 February 2025)
2 February 2025
15:30 WIB (UTC+7)

Trisukma	1–1	Putra Tangerang
	Report

Heroic Group 1 Kopassus Stadium, Serang
4 February 2025
13:15 WIB (UTC+7)

Bantara	0–0	Persic
	Report

Heroic Group 1 Kopassus Stadium, Serang

Matchday 2 (7 February 2025)
7 February 2025
13:30 WIB (UTC+7)

Putra Tangerang	0–0	Bantara
	Report

Heroic Group 1 Kopassus Stadium, Serang
7 February 2025
15:30 WIB (UTC+7)

Persic	3–0	Trisukma
	Report

Heroic Group 1 Kopassus Stadium, Serang

Matchday 3 (10–11 February 2025)
10 February 2025
15:30 WIB (UTC+7)

Trisukma	0–1	Bantara
	Report

Heroic Group 1 Kopassus Stadium, Serang
11 February 2025
13:15 WIB (UTC+7)

Putra Tangerang	1–5	Persic
	Report

Heroic Group 1 Kopassus Stadium, Serang

=== Group C ===
All matches will be held at Heroic Group 1 Kopassus Stadium, Serang.

Pos	Team	Pld	W	D	L	GF	GA	GD	Pts	Qualification	JFC	NAT	DUT	GON
1	Jagat	3	3	0	0	6	0	+6	9	Qualification to the Knockout stage	—	—	—	2–0
2	Nathan Lebak	3	2	0	1	10	1	+9	6	Qualification to the Knockout stage	0–1	—	5–0	—
3	Duta	3	1	0	2	3	9	−6	3		0–3	—	—	3–1
4	Persigon	3	0	0	3	1	10	−9	0		—	0–5	—	—

Source: Liga 4 Banten
Rules for classification: 1) Points; 2) Head-to-head points; 3) Head-to-head goal difference; 4) Head-to-head goals scored; 5) Goal difference; 6) Goals scored; 7) Fair-play points; 8) Draw.

==== Group C Matches ====
Matchday 1 (4–5 February 2025)
4 February 2025
15:30 WIB (UTC+7)

Nathan Lebak	5–0	Duta
	Report

Heroic Group 1 Kopassus Stadium, Serang
5 February 2025
13:15 WIB (UTC+7)

Jagat	2–0	Persigon
	Report

Heroic Group 1 Kopassus Stadium, Serang

Matchday 2 (8 February 2025)
8 February 2025
13:15 WIB (UTC+7)

Duta	0–3	Jagat
	Report

Heroic Group 1 Kopassus Stadium, Serang
8 February 2025
15:30 WIB (UTC+7)

Persigon	0–5	Nathan Lebak
	Report

Heroic Group 1 Kopassus Stadium, Serang

Matchday 3 (11–12 February 2025)
11 February 2025
15:30 WIB (UTC+7)

Nathan Lebak	0–1	Jagat
	Report

Heroic Group 1 Kopassus Stadium, Serang
12 February 2025
13:15 WIB (UTC+7)

Duta	3–1	Persigon
	Report

Heroic Group 1 Kopassus Stadium, Serang

=== Group D ===
All matches will be held at Heroic Group 1 Kopassus Stadium, Serang.

Pos	Team	Pld	W	D	L	GF	GA	GD	Pts	Qualification	HAR	RAG	TSL
1	Harin	2	1	0	1	2	1	+1	3	Qualification to the Knockout stage	—	—	2–0
2	Raga Negeri	2	1	0	1	2	2	0	3	Qualification to the Knockout stage	1–0	—	—
3	Persitangsel	2	1	0	1	2	3	−1	3		—	2–1	—

Source: Liga 4 Banten
Rules for classification: 1) Points; 2) Head-to-head points; 3) Head-to-head goal difference; 4) Head-to-head goals scored; 5) Goal difference; 6) Goals scored; 7) Fair-play points; 8) Draw.

==== Group D Matches ====
Matchday 1 (5 February 2025)
5 February 2025
15:30 WIB (UTC+7)

Persitangsel	2–1	Raga Negeri
	Report

Heroic Group 1 Kopassus Stadium, Serang

Matchday 2 (9 February 2025)
9 February 2025
13:15 WIB (UTC+7)

Raga Negeri	1–0	Harin
	Report

Heroic Group 1 Kopassus Stadium, Serang

Matchday 3 (12 February 2025)
12 February 2025
15:30 WIB (UTC+7)

Harin	2–0	Persitangsel
	Report

Heroic Group 1 Kopassus Stadium, Serang

== Knockout stage ==
The knockout stage will be played as a single match. If tied after regulation time, extra time and, if necessary, a penalty shoot-out will be used to decide the winning team. The finalist will qualify for the national phase.

=== Bracket ===
Quarter-finals
14 February 2025 – Cilegon
A1	Matrix Putra Brother's	2
C2	Nathan Lebak	4
14 February 2025 – Cilegon
B1	Persic	3
D2	Raga Negeri	0
15 February 2025 – Cilegon
C1	Jagat	2
A2	Serpong City	1
15 February 2025 – Cilegon
D1	Harin	2
B2	Bantara	1

Semi-finals
17 February 2025 – Cilegon
Nathan Lebak	1
Persic	3
17 February 2025 – Cilegon
Jagat	1 (2)
Harin (p)	1 (4)

Final
19 February 2025 – Cilegon
Persic	3
Harin	0
Third place play-off
19 February 2025 – Cilegon
Nathan Lebak	5 (4)
Jagat	5 (3)

=== Quarter-finals ===
14 February 2025
13:30 WIB (UTC+7)

Matrix Putra Brother's	2–4	Nathan Lebak
	Report

Gelora Geger Stadium, Cilegon

14 February 2025
15:30 WIB (UTC+7)

Persic	3–0	Raga Negeri
	Report

Gelora Geger Stadium, Cilegon

15 February 2025
13:30 WIB (UTC+7)

Jagat	2–1	Serpong City
	Report

Gelora Geger Stadium, Cilegon

15 February 2025
15:30 WIB (UTC+7)

Harin	2–1	Bantara
	Report

Gelora Geger Stadium, Cilegon

=== Semi-finals ===
17 February 2025
13:30 WIB (UTC+7)

Nathan Lebak	1–3	Persic
	Report

Gelora Geger Stadium, Cilegon

17 February 2025
15:30 WIB (UTC+7)

Jagat	1–1	Harin
	Report
Penalties
	2–4

Gelora Geger Stadium, Cilegon

=== Third place play-off ===
19 February 2025
13:00 WIB (UTC+7)

Nathan Lebak	5–5	Jagat
	Report
Penalties
	4–3

Gelora Geger Stadium, Cilegon

=== Final ===
19 February 2025
15:15 WIB (UTC+7)

Persic	3–0	Harin
	Report

Gelora Geger Stadium, Cilegon

== See also ==
- 2024–25 Liga 4
