= SMP Negeri 1 Cilegon =

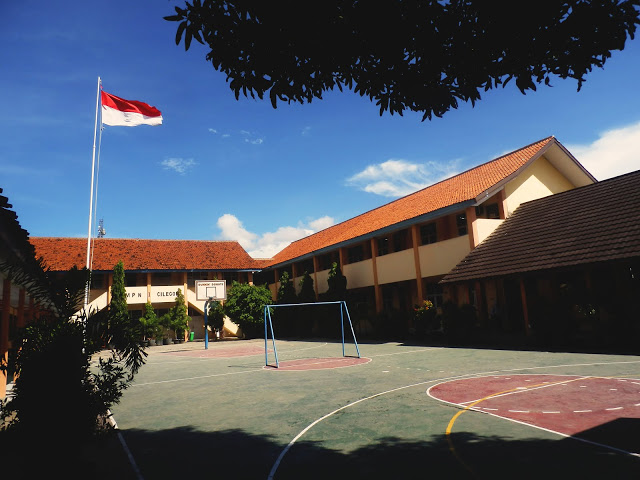
- Main building

Location
- Jalan Cut Nyak Dien; Cilegon, Banten 42411; Indonesia

Information
- Type: Public school
- Established: January 1958
- Principal: Hj.Reny Damayanti, S.Pd, M.Pd
- Grades: 7–9
- Accreditation: A
- Website: http://smpn1-cilegon.sch.id/

Sekolah Menengah Pertama Negeri 1 Cilegon (English: State Junior High School 1 Cilegon) or nicknamed SMPN 1 Cilegon is a public junior high school situated in Jalan Cut Nyak Dien No.34 Cilegon, Banten, Indonesia.

== History ==
Firstly, this school opened in January 1958 in Pegantungan, Cilegon, was originally remote classes from the SMP Negeri Serang. Then in the 70's, the school relocated to Jalan Stasiun (Jalan Cut Nyak Dien) with the name of SMP Cilegon, which at the time was a former prison built by the military region command of Maulana Yusuf. so it known by the name of SMP Maulana Yusuf. In 1982, the government opened more schools in Cilegon, since then SMP Cilegon become SMPN 1 Cilegon
