= Mohammadou Al Hadji =

Cameroonian footballer

Personal information
- Full name: Mohammadou Al Hadji Adamou
- Date of birth: 26 November 1986 (age 39)
- Place of birth: Nanga Eboko, Cameroon
- Height: 1.88 m (6 ft 2 in)
- Position: Centre-back

Team information
- Current team: Banyuwangi Putra
- Number: 45

Senior career*
Years	Team	Apps	(Gls)
2007–2008	PKT Bontang	14	(1)
2009–2012	Pattani	74	(18)
2012–2013	Persebaya DU	22	(0)
2013–2014	Persik Kediri	20	(2)
2015–2016	Semen Padang	18	(0)
2016–2017	Barito Putera	15	(1)
2017–2018	Borneo	12	(1)
2018–2019	Sriwijaya	7	(0)
2019	PSMS Medan	7	(1)
2021–2022	Serpong City	16	(0)
2024–	Banyuwangi Putra	8	(0)
- * Club domestic league appearances and goals as of 5 February 2025

Mohammadou Al Hadji Adamou (born 26 November 1986) is a Cameroonian footballer who plays as a centre-back for Liga 4 club Banyuwangi Putra.

== Career ==
=== Barito Putera ===
On 26 April 2016, Mohammadou signed one-year contract with Liga 1 club PS Barito Putera. He made his debut as a professional on 30 April 2016, starting and playing the full 90 minutes in a 1–2 loss against Bhayangkara.

=== Borneo ===
On 12 March 2018, Mohammadou signed one-year contract with Liga 1 club Borneo. On 25 March 2018, Mohammadou made his debut against Sriwijaya in the 2018 Liga 1 in a 0–0 draw home at Segiri Samarinda Stadium.

=== Sriwijaya ===
In middle season 2018, Al Hadji signed a year contract with Liga 1 club Sriwijaya from Borneo. He made his league debut on 11 August 2018 against Madura United at the Gelora Sriwijaya Stadium, Palembang.

=== PSMS Medan ===
He was signed for PSMS Medan to play in Liga 2 in the 2019 season. He made 7 league appearances and scored 1 goal for PSMS Medan.

=== Serpong City ===
He was signed for Serpong City to play in Liga 3 in the 2021 season. Al Hadji made his debut on 3 November 2021 in a match against Jagat. He made 16 league appearances and without scoring a goal for Serpong City.

== Personal life ==
On 31 January 2018, he officially became an Indonesian citizen after going through naturalization process.

== Career statistics ==
As of 13 March 2022

Appearances and goals by club, season and competition
Club	Season	League			Cup		Continental		Other		Total	
Club	Season	Division	Apps	Goals	Apps	Goals	Apps	Goals	Apps	Goals	Apps	Goals
Borneo	2018	Liga 1	12	1	0	0	–		0	0	12	1
Sriwijaya	2018	Liga 1	7	0	0	0	–		0	0	7	0
PSMS Medan	2019	Liga 2	7	1	0	0	–		0	0	7	1
Serpong City	2021	Liga 3	16	0	0	0	–		0	0	16	0
Career total			42	2	0	0	0	0	0	0	42	2
