= Anyar Pratama F.C. =

Indonesian football club

Anyar Pratama
- Full name: Anyar Pratama Football Club
- Nickname(s): Pendekar Selat Sunda (Sunda Strait Warriors)
- Short name: APFC
- Founded: 1998; 27 years ago
- Ground: Maulana Yusuf Stadium
- Capacity: 15,000
- Owner: Askab PSSI Serang
- Chairman: H. Fahmi Hakim
- Manager: Maryono
- League: Liga 4
- 2021: 4th in Group B, (Banten zone)
Home colours	Away colours

Anyar Pratama Football Club (simply known as APFC or Anyar Pratama) is an Indonesian football club based in Anyer, Serang Regency, Banten. They currently compete in the Liga 4.
