= Serpong City F.C. =

Indonesian football club

Serpong City
- Full name: Serpong City Football Club
- Nickname: Red Beast
- Short name: SCFC
- Founded: 12 December 2012; 13 years ago
- Ground: Sabnani Field, South Tangerang
- Capacity: 150
- Owner(s): Nabil Husein; Mochamad Chandra Kurniawan; Daniel Zii; Kemal Sabnani; Ricky Nelson
- Coach: Vacant
- League: Liga 4
- 2024–25: Quarter final, (Banten zone)
Home colours	Away colours

Serpong City Football Club (simply known as Serpong City) is an Indonesian football club based in North Serpong, South Tangerang, Banten. Starting as a soccer school club in 2012, they now compete in Liga 4, and in 2021, they were inaugurated in to the PSSI congress as a professional football club.

== History ==
Initially, Serpong City was a football school that was founded on December 12, 2012., Serpong City Soccer School (SCSS) was founded by coach Ricky Nelson and Earlier with Kemal Sabnani with the motto "Better Skill Better Football". they have the vision and mission to focus on developing the individual skills of players and also train mentally.

On 29 May 2021, when the PSSI congress became a momentum for them, at that time Serpong City was inaugurated as a new member of PSSI and was ready to compete in Indonesian Liga 3 for the first time, they are like being reborn as a Professional Football Club.

The heights momentum is become the Champions of Banten in 2022

Serpong City has continued to nurture and produce many young players for 9 years since 2012, and after being inaugurated as a professional club, Serpong City only has to continue the football pyramid of coaching that was previously owned.

On 3 November 2021, Serpong City made their first league match debut in a 3–1 win against club from Cilegon Jagat F.C. at the Krakatau Steel Stadium, in the next match, Serpong City will face a team also from South Tangerang Bintang Junior. two days later, in that match, they had their second match in an 8–0 biggest win against Bintang Junior. On 15 November, they closed the match in the group stage of the 2021 Liga 3 Banten zone in an 11–1 biggest win against Gundala, with this result, they qualified for the second round as runners-up Group C. On 25 November, they qualified for the semi-finals of the Liga 3 Banten zone as group F winners after their match won 3–0 over Persipan Pandeglang. but the unsatisfactory result occurred during the semi-final match against Persikota Tangerang three days later, they failed to reach the final after draw 0–0 in the first half to extra time, and lost on penalties (4–5). Serpong City qualified for the 2021 Liga 3 national round with the title of third place in the Banten zone after in their match they won 2–1 over Matrix Putra Brother's.

== Players ==
=== Current squad ===
Note: Flags indicate national team as defined under FIFA eligibility rules; some limited exceptions apply. Players may hold more than one non-FIFA nationality.

No.	Pos.	Nation	Player
1	GK	IDN	Dhafa Febrian Pribadi
3	DF	IDN	Yohanis Don Bosco Sakliressy
5	MF	IDN	Yohanes Sole
7	FW	IDN	Ronan Aryo
8	MF	IDN	Wilfianus Gula
9	FW	IDN	Rizky Dwi
10	MF	IDN	Abin Mubin
11	FW	IDN	Abdul Rahman
12	MF	IDN	Muhammad Baty
13	MF	IDN	Kurnia Fajri
14	MF	IDN	Rifial Akbar
15	MF	IDN	Ellod Darkos
16	MF	IDN	Rafly Alfariz
17	DF	IDN	Fahran Anzola
20	FW	IDN	Hilal Rahardien

No.	Pos.	Nation	Player
21	MF	IDN	Flabiola Soares
22	DF	IDN	Ahmad Surahman
23	DF	IDN	Muhammad Rizky Semarang
25	FW	IDN	Febri Setiadi Hamzah
26	DF	IDN	Mario Rex De Nono
27	MF	IDN	Danur
28	GK	IDN	Afrianus Moi
29	FW	IDN	Bayu Tri Sanjaya
40	GK	IDN	Muhammad Zul Fikri
44	DF	IDN	Aldy Rizky
77	MF	IDN	Faturahman
86	DF	CMR	Mohammadou Al Hadji (captain)
88	MF	IDN	Daud Esthen Banoet
94	MF	IDN	Samsudin Lontoh

== Stadium ==
They also chose Sabnani Park in North Serpong, South Tangerang, as their home base. The choice was taken because Sabnani Park has international standard facilities.

Sabnani Park was built and planted with grass according to FIFA and AFC standards. The field with dimensions of 40x30m is an ideal size for the development of children aged 5–12 years, with a 7v7 and 9v9 playing pattern.

== Honours ==
- Liga 3 Banten
  - Champion (1): 2022
  - Third-place (1): 2021
