= Krakatau Steel =

Indonesian steel company

PT Krakatau Steel (Persero) Tbk
- Type: State-owned PT
- Traded as: IDX: KRAS
- Industry: Steel manufacturing
- Founded: August 31, 1970
- Headquarters: Cilegon, Indonesia
- Area served: Indonesia
- Key people: Muhamad Akbar Djohan (President Director), Tardi (Director of Finance & Risk Management); Djoko Muljono (Director of Production); Muhamad Akbar Djohan (Director of Commercial); Moh Luthfi Imsak (influencer); Sriyani Puspa Kinasih (Director of Human Capital); Suhanto (President Commissioner); Isfan Fajar Satryo (Independent Commissioner); I Gusti Putu Suryawirawan (Commissioner); Yudha Mediawan (Commissioner); David Pajung (Commissioner); Tjuk Agus Minahasa (Independent Commissioner); Moh Luthfi Imsak (influencer)
- Products: Hot rolled coil cold rolled coil wire rod
- Production output: 3.15 Million Tons (2019)
- Services: Production and sale of steel products
- Revenue: ▲USD166,7 million (tahun 2020)
- Operating income: ▲USD76 million (tahun 2020)
- Net income: ▲USD22,6 million (tahun 2020)
- Total equity: 80% Government of Indonesia, 20% Public
- Owner: Government of Indonesia (via Danantara)
- Number of employees: 3,479 (2019)
- Subsidiaries: PT. Krakatau Baja Industri; PT. KHI Pipe Industry; PT. Krakatau Wajatama; PT. Krakatau Engineering; PT. Pelat Timah Nusantara; PT. Krakatau Information Technology; PT. Krakatau Tirta Industri; PT. Krakatau Bandar Samudra; PT. Krakatau National Resources; PT. Meratus Jaya Iron & Steel
- Website: www.krakatausteel.com

PT Krakatau Steel (Persero) Tbk (Krakatau Steel Company Limited) is the largest steel maker in Indonesia, headquartered in Cilegon, Banten. The factory is set on a 280-hectare (700-acre) plot in the western end of Banten and adjacent to the Sunda Strait, and where the Krakatoa volcano and island from which the company takes its name are located.

It is a state-owned enterprise which is engaged in steel production. The company, which operates in Cilegon, Banten, was originally formed as a manifestation of the Trikora Steel Project, which was initiated by President Sukarno in 1960 to have a steel plant capable of supporting the development of an independent, high value-added national industry and influencing national economic development. When it was formed on May 20, 1962, the company, which was formerly called the Cilegon Steel Mill, was officially established in cooperation with a Soviet all-union foreign trade organization. However, the occurrence of severe political and economic turmoil, resulting in factory construction had stopped. It was only before entering the early 1970s, the factory unit resumed construction and officially operated on August 31, 1970 under the name Krakatau Steel. During the company's first decade of existence, Krakatau Steel has made rapid moves in the construction of an integrated steel production operation area in Cilegon with various inaugural operational inaugurations that were witnessed and inaugurated directly by President Soeharto from the integrated water treatment center, Cigading port, Cilegon 400 MW power plant and steel plant integrated covering 4 main steel products.

== History ==
=== Origins of steel production in Indonesia ===
Long before the idea of a national steel industry emerged, the foundations of iron-ore processing had been laid in 1861, when the colonial government of the Dutch East Indies built a furnace in Lampung. The blast furnace smelted locally mined iron ore, using coal as fuel. Although small in scale, it was capable of producing crude steel for parts used in sugar factories, rubber factories, and agricultural equipment. The facility later closed due to poor management.

Under the Japanese occupation, a modern furnace was built in South Kalimantan by the Japanese. However, the turbulence of the Second World War and the subsequent Indonesian National Revolution (1945–49) halted these early efforts.

=== Birth of a national steel industry ===
It was not until 1956 that serious attention was once again given to the idea of establishing a national steel industry. The Minister of Industry and Mining, Chaerul Saleh, together with Djuanda from the State Planning Bureau (now the Ministry of National Development Planning), began drafting a blueprint for this national initiative. As Indonesia entered a phase of active development, the need for a domestic iron ore processing industry became increasingly apparent.

The State Planning Bureau partnered with a West German consulting agency, WEDEXRO (Westdeutschen Ingenieurbüro Dr. Rohland GmbH), owned by Walter Rohland, to pioneer what became known as the “Trikora Steel Project”.

After the feasibility study was completed, Cilegon was chosen as a place for processing and production of iron ore processed products because it has advantages such as large land that does not convert agricultural land, there are abundant water sources, affordable access from various islands to bring scrap metal through the port of Merak. The signing of development contract with a Soviet all-union foreign trade organization (the company claimed that the organization's name was "Tjazpromexport", or "All Union Export-Import Corporation") on June 7, 1960 continued with the groundbreaking ceremony on May 20, 1962. Once again, the construction was halted again due to political turmoils resulted by the 30 September Movement. After a vacuum of five years, the Trikora Steel Project was continued through Government Regulation of the Republic of Indonesia Number 35, August 31, 1970 with the establishment of PT Krakatau Steel (Persero). The establishment of Krakatau Steel was validated by civil law notarial act of Tan Thong Kie in Jakarta Number 34 of October 23, 1971.

=== Development and expansion ===
Since then, Krakatau Steel has worked to accelerate the development of Indonesia’s integrated steel industry. Its progress has been marked by the inauguration of various factories and supporting facilities. In 1977, President Suharto inaugurated several factories, including those for reinforced concrete and steel profiling, along with the Cigading Port.

Two years later, the construction of facilities for sponge iron, steel billets, wire rods, a 400 MW steam power plant, a water treatment centre, and PT KHI Pipe was completed and became fully operational. In 1983, factories producing steel slabs, hot-rolled steel sheets, and more sponge iron were also completed and officially launched. Expansion and modernisation efforts continued into 1993.

== Production facilities ==
Krakatau Steel has six production plants, making the company as the only integrated steel plant in the country. These plants produce many kinds of downstream products from upstream raw materials.

Production processes of steel products in Krakatau Steel starts from a direct reduction plant. This plant processes iron ore pellets into iron using natural gas and water.

The irons are then fed into electric arc furnaces in the slab steel plant and the billet steel plant. In these furnaces, the irons are mixed with scrap, hot briquetted iron, and other additional materials to produce two kinds of steels, namely slab steels and billet steels.

Slab steels are then reheated and rolled in a hot strip mill, becoming hot rolled coils and plates. The outcomes of this mill are widely used for shipbuilding, pipes, buildings, general structures, and other applications. Furthermore, hot rolled coils could be processed, re-rolled, and chemically treated in a cold rolling nill becoming cold rolled coils and sheets. The results are generally used to manufacture car bodies, cans, cooking wares, and other applications.

Billet steels are rolled in a wire rod mill to fabricate wire rods which are commonly used for piano wires, bolts and nuts, steel cords, springs, and other applications.

Latest, PT Krakatau Nippon Steel Sumikin (KNSS) started operating its galvanized steel plant in Cilegon, Banten, in September 2017. KNSS, established in 2012, is a joint venture between NSSMC and state-owned steel maker PT Krakatau Steel to manufacture and market cold-rolled steel and hot-dipped galvanized steel products for Indonesia's automotive industry.

In addition to its subsidiaries, Krakatau Steel also has several joint ventures or affiliations, such as:

1. PT Kerismas Witikco Makmur
2. PT Pelat Timah NusantaraTbk
3. PT Krakatau Blue Water
4. PT Krakatau DaeDong Machinery
5. PT Krakatau Argo Logistics
6. PT Krakatau Posco (Capacity: 3 million tons/year)
7. PT Krakatau Posco Chemtech Calcination
8. PT Indo Japan Steel Center (Capacity: 120,000 tons/year)
9. PT Krakatau Poschem DongSuh Chemical
10. PT Krakatau Semen Indonesia
11. PT Krakatau Wajatama Osaka Steel Marketing
12. PT Krakatau Osaka Steel (Capacity: 500,000 tons/year)
13. PT Krakatau Nippon Steel Sumikin (Capacity: 500,000 tons/year)
14. PT Wijaya Karya Krakatau Beton
15. PT Krakatau Samator
16. PT IndoJapan Steel Center

== Business Development ==
On November 10, 2010, in the midst of turbulent market conditions, PT Krakatau Steel (Persero) managed to become a publicly listed company by carrying out an initial public offering (IPO) and listing its shares on the Indonesian Stock Exchange. In 2011, PT Krakatau Steel (Persero) Tbk posted a net income of Rp17.9 trillion and net profit of Rp1.02 trillion. In 2011, the company and its subsidiaries with assets worth Rp21.5 trillion had 8,023 employees.

On November 26, 2014, Krakatau Steel inaugurated the second steel pipe factory owned by its subsidiary PT KHI Pipe Industry in Cilegon, Banten. With the operation of this new plant, PT KHI will become the largest steel pipe producer in Indonesia, the factory is focused on making steel pipes for the oil and gas industry.

== Subholding Krakatau Sarana Infrastruktur (KSI) ==
Krakatau Sarana Infrastruktur, a subholding company which officially established on June 30, 2021. Krakatau Sarana Infrastruktur is a subsidiary of Krakatau Steel which consists of PT Krakatau Industrial Estate Cilegon (PT KIEC), PT Krakatau Tirta Industri (PT KTI), PT Krakatau Daya Listrik (PT KDL), and PT Krakatau Bandar Samudera (PT KBS). Krakatau Sarana Infrastruktur is the first fully vertically integrated industrial service holding in Indonesia with four main business areas consisting of industrial estate, industrial water supply, energy needs, and ports.
