= Maulana Yusuf Stadium =

Stadium in Indonesia

Coordinates: 6°07′06.8″S 106°10′32.0″E

- SMY
- Location in Java
- Location: Serang, Banten, Indonesia
- Owner: Government of Serang Municipalities
- Operator: Government of Serang Municipalities
- Capacity: 15,000
- Surface: Grass field

Construction
- Built: 1983
- Opened: 1985
- Renovated: 2012–2014

Tenants
- Perserang Serang; Banten Jaya; Serang Jaya; Anyar Pratama

Maulana Yusuf Stadium (Stadion Maulana Yusuf) is the name of a football stadium in the city of Serang, Banten, Indonesia. It was named after the third Sultan of Banten is used as the home venue for Perserang Serang of the Liga Indonesia. The stadium has a capacity of 15,000. The stadium was built in 1983.
