= Soeratin Cup =

- Organiser(s): PSSI
- Founded: 1965; 61 years ago
- Region: Indonesia
- Teams: National; 29 (U17); 23 (U15); 23 (U13)
- Current champions: U18/U17: Persika Karanganyar (1st title); U15: SSB biMBA-AIUEO (1st title); U13: Persib Bandung (1st title)
- Most championships: U18/U17; Persijap Jepara; Persebaya Surabaya (3 titles each); U15; Seven clubs (1 title each); U13; Four clubs (1 title each)
- 2025

Soeratin Cup is an Indonesian football competition for players under the age of eighteen. Previously the competition was sponsored by Indofood and was called Liga Indofood.

Soeratin name used as the name for the dedicated this championship trophy as a tribute to one of the main founder and the chairman of the Football Association of Indonesia (PSSI).

The participants of this competition comes from all junior clubs from all board members to thirty-four local football associations throughout Indonesia.

== Competition format ==
The competition begins with a competition at the district and the city that is held simultaneously across the board football union branches throughout Indonesia. The best team drives the next round of competition at the provincial level.

=== Provincial ===
This provincial competition follows the best teams from each competition that is held by the Indonesian football union branch manager in the area of the province. The competition is held by the Indonesian football association board area. Two to four best teams from every province of this round advance to the regional level or the level of the island.

=== Region ===
The competition level of this region is held in six regions of northern Sumatra, southern Sumatra, Java-Bali, Kalimantan (Borneo), Sulawesi and eastern Indonesia (Nusa Tenggara · Maluku · Papua). A total of thirty two teams qualify for the national level.

=== National ===
National competition is held by the board Indonesian youth development section. This competition will produce future players for the Indonesia national football team.

== Champions ==
=== Under-18 (1965–2011) ===
Season	Champions	Score	Runners-up
1965	Persema Malang	—N/a	—N/a
1967	Persija Jakarta; PSMS Medan	—N/a	—N/a
1970	Persija Jakarta	—N/a	—N/a
1972	Persija Jakarta	—N/a	—N/a
1974	Persija Jakarta	—N/a	—N/a
1976	Persebaya Surabaya	—N/a	—N/a
1978	Persiter Ternate	—N/a	—N/a
1980	PSMS Medan	—N/a	—N/a
1984	Persikasi Bekasi	3–1	Persiter Ternate
1985	Persikasi Bekasi	—N/a	—N/a
1987	Persiss Sorong	1–0	Persipas Pangkalpinang
1989	Persikasi Bekasi	—N/a	—N/a
1991	Persikasi Bekasi	1–0	Perseden Denpasar
1992	PSB Bogor	—N/a	PSIM Yogyakarta
1993	PSB Bogor	—N/a	Persebaya Surabaya
1994	Persikasi Bekasi	—N/a	—N/a
1995	PSB Bogor	—N/a	Persis Solo
1996	Persema Malang	3–2	Medan Jaya
1998	Persijap Jepara	2–1	Persebaya Surabaya
2000	Persijatim Jakarta Timur	1–0	Persija Jakarta
2001	Persebaya Surabaya	—N/a	Persedikab Kediri
2002	Persijap Jepara	—N/a	PSIS Semarang
2003	Persib Bandung	2–1	PSIS Semarang
2004	PSIS Semarang	—N/a	Persebaya Surabaya
2005	PS Mojokerto Putra	—N/a	Persipura Jayapura
2006	Persib Bandung	2–1	PSIS Semarang
2007	Arema Malang	2–1	Persimuba Musi Banyuasin
2008	Persekabpas Pasuruan	6–5 (p)	Persikasi Bekasi
2009	Perseba Bangkalan	2–1	Persema Malang
2010	Villa 2000	1–0	PSIS Semarang

=== Under-17 (2012–present) ===
Season	Champions	Score	Runners-up
2012	PSDS Deli Serdang	2–2 (6–5) (p)	Persema Malang
2014	Jember United	3–1	Persis Solo
2016	Persab Brebes	4–1	Askot Kota Samarinda
2017	PKN Penajam Utama	3–2	Persita Tangerang
2019	Persebaya Surabaya	2–0	Persipan Pandeglang
2019–20	PSBK Blitar	1–0	PS Palembang
2021–22	Bhayangkara	3–0	PSJS South Jakarta
2023–24	Batavia	1–1 (5–3) (p)	Persikopa Pariaman
2024–25	Duta	3–1	Persikopa Pariaman
2025	Persika Karanganyar	2–1	Persikota Tangerang
2026	Waamanat Bhintuka	2–1	Persebaya Surabaya

=== Under-15 (2017–present) ===
Season	Champions	Score	Runners-up
2017	Askot Kota Bandung	4–1	PSSA Asahan
2019	SSB All Star Rahuning	2–1	Persis Solo
2019–20	PSP Padang	2–1	Gabsis Sambas
2021–22	ASIOP	0–0 (3–2) (p)	PSSA Asahan
2023–24	Persija Muda	2–1	Persebaya Surabaya
2024–25	Josal Piaman	2–1	Gabsis Sambas
2025	SSB biMBA-AIUEO	2–1	PS Freeport Indonesia
2026	Persib Bandung	3–0	Bali United

=== Under-13 (2022–present) ===
Season	Champions	Score	Runners-up
2021–22	Asiana SS	2–1	Bhayangkara
2023–24	Persikutim East Kutai	1–1 (5–4) (p)	ASIOP
2024–25	Persebaya Surabaya	0–0 (4–1) (p)	Persib Bandung
2025	Persib Bandung	2–1	ASIOP
2026	ASIOP	1–1 (4–2) (p)	Persebaya Surabaya
