= Krakatau Steel Stadium =

Stadium in Banten, Indonesia

- KS
- Location in Java
- Address: JL Kotasari, No. 1, Komplek Krakatau Steel, Kotabumi, Cilegon, Banten 42434; Indonesia
- Location: Cilegon, Banten
- Coordinates: 5.996090°S 106.039656°E
- Owner: Krakatau Steel Company Limited
- Operator: Krakatau Steel Company Limited
- Capacity: 5,000

Construction
- Renovated: 2004

Tenants
- Pelita Krakatau Steel (2002–2006); RANS Cilegon (2012–); Persic Cilegon (2021–); Persigon Cilegon (2020–)

Krakatau Steel Stadium is a multi-purpose stadium in Cilegon, Banten, Indonesia. It is mostly used for football matches and is the home stadium of RANS Cilegon, Persic Cilegon and Persigon Cilegon.
