= Persigon Cilegon =

Indonesian football club in Banten

Persigon
- Full name: Persatuan Sepakbola Indonesia Cilegon
- Nickname: Laskar Kota Baja
- Founded: 2020; 6 years ago
- Ground: Krakatau Steel Stadium
- Capacity: 5,000
- Owner: PSSI Cilegon City
- President: Dian Iswahyudi
- Manager: Ardi Maulana
- Coach: Dassuparidi
- League: Liga 4
- 2024–25: 4th, in Group C (Banten zone)
Home colours	Away colours

Persatuan Sepakbola Indonesia Cilegon (simply known as Persigon) is an Indonesian football club based in Cilegon, Banten. They currently compete in the Liga 4 and their homeground is Krakatau Steel Stadium.
