= Banten Jaya F.C. =

Indonesian football club in Banten

Banten Jaya
- Full name: Banten Jaya Football Club
- Nickname: Jawara Banten
- Short name: BJFC
- Founded: 2018; 8 years ago
- Ground: Maulana Yusuf Stadium
- Capacity: 15,000
- Owner: Rico Sahadi
- Chairman: Rico Sahadi
- Manager: Muhamad Sam'un
- Coach: Wowo Suntoro
- League: Liga 4
- 2021: 4th in Group C, (Banten zone)
Home colours	Away colours

Banten Jaya Football Club (simply known as BJFC or Banten Jaya) is an Indonesian football club based in Serang, Banten. They currently compete in the Liga 4 and their homeground is Maulana Yusuf Stadium.
