= Serang Jaya F.C. =

Indonesian football club in Banten

Serang Jaya
- Full name: Serang Jaya Football Club
- Nicknames: Laskar Surosowan; Pasukan Hijau
- Short name: SJFC
- Founded: 2021; 5 years ago
- Ground: Maulana Yusuf Stadium
- Capacity: 15,000
- Owner: Askot PSSI Serang
- Chairman: Subadri Ushuludin
- Manager: Yoyo Wicahyono
- Coach: Budi Santoso
- League: Liga 4
- 2023: Quarter-finals, (Banten zone)
Home colours	Away colours

Serang Jaya Football Club (simply known as SJFC or Serang Jaya) is an Indonesian football club based in Serang, Banten. They currently compete in the Liga 4 and their homeground is Maulana Yusuf Stadium.
