= Binjai United F.C. =

Indonesian football club in North Sumatra

Binjai United
- Full name: Binjai United Football Club
- Nicknames: Kambing Jantan (The Rams)
- Founded: 2013; 13 years ago
- Ground: PTPN II Tandam Hulu Field; Binjai, North Sumatra
- Owner: Askot PSSI Binjai
- Chairman: Yudi Irawan
- Manager: Mohan
- Coach: Amran
- League: Liga 4
- 2021: Round of 16, (North Sumatra zone)
Home colours	Away colours

Binjai United Football Club (simply known as BUFC or Binjai United) is an Indonesian football club based in Binjai, North Sumatra. They currently compete in the Liga 4 and their homeground is PTPN II Tandam Hulu Field.
