= Persic Cilegon =

Indonesian football club in Banten

Persic
- Full name: Persatuan Sepakbola Indonesia Cilegon
- Nicknames: Pasukan Kota Baja; Laskar Geger Cilegon
- Short name: Persic
- Founded: 1999; 27 years ago
- Ground: Krakatau Steel Stadium
- Capacity: 5,000
- Owner: PSSI Cilegon City
- Chairman: Robinsar
- Manager: Agung Kurniawan
- Coach: Muhammad Said Helmy
- League: Liga 4
- 2024–25: 1st (Banten zone); Third round, 3rd in Group B (National phase)
| Home colours | Away colours |

Persatuan Sepakbola Indonesia Cilegon (simply known as Persic) is an Indonesian football club based in Cilegon, Banten. They currently compete in the Liga 4 and their homeground is Krakatau Steel Stadium.

== Honours ==
- Liga 3 Banten
  - Third-place (1): 2023
- Liga 4 Banten
  - Champion (1): 2024–25
