= Persitangsel South Tangerang =

Indonesian football club

Persitangsel
- Full name: Persatuan Sepakbola Indonesia Tangerang Selatan
- Nickname(s): Laskar Cipasera
- Founded: 2009; 16 years ago
- Ground: Mini Ciputat Stadium; South Tangerang, Banten
- Capacity: 1,000
- Owner: PSSI South Tangerang
- Chairman: H. Muhamad
- Manager: Taufik Sukartono
- Coach: Bayu Iswadi
- League: Liga 4
- 2024–25: 3rd, in Group D (Banten zone)
Home colours	Away colours

Persatuan Sepakbola Indonesia Tangerang Selatan (simply known as Persitangsel) is an Indonesian football club based in South Tangerang, Banten. They currently plays in Liga 4 Banten zone.

== Honours ==
- Liga 3 Banten
  - Champion (1): 2017
