= Persipan Pandeglang =

Indonesian football club

Persipan
- Full name: Persatuan Sepakbola Indonesia Pandeglang
- Nickname(s): Laskar Ujung Kulon
- Founded: 1953; 72 years ago
- Ground: Badak Stadium; Pandeglang, Banten
- Capacity: 15,000
- Owner: Pandeglang Raya Group
- Manager: Ayatullah Mujahidin
- Coach: Suwita Pata
- League: Liga 4
- 2024–25: Not participation
- Website: Official website
Home colours	Away colours

Persatuan Sepakbola Indonesia Pandeglang (simply known as Persipan) is an Indonesian football club based in Pandeglang, Banten. They currently compete in the Liga 4 Banten zone.

== History ==
Persipan with Persita Tangerang are oldest football club in Banten. On youth level, Persipan highest achievement is 2018–19 Soeratin Cup runner-up after lose 2–0 against Persebaya Surabaya on final match in Blitar, East Java.

== Players ==
=== Current squad ===
As of 26 August 2020

Note: Flags indicate national team as defined under FIFA eligibility rules; some limited exceptions apply. Players may hold more than one non-FIFA nationality.

No.	Pos.	Nation	Player
—	GK	(Indonesia) IDN	Dian Aji
—		(Indonesia) IDN	Gilang Ramadhan
3	DF	(Indonesia) IDN	Zidan
—		(Indonesia) IDN	Miftahuddin
—		(Indonesia) IDN	Elvan
—	DF	(Indonesia) IDN	Hamdani
7	FW	(Indonesia) IDN	Abdul Karim
—	MF	(Indonesia) IDN	Andi Lala
—		(Indonesia) IDN	Ferdi Renaldi
10	MF	(Indonesia) IDN	Masrur Dasuki
—		(Indonesia) IDN	Muhammad Lensa
—		(Indonesia) IDN	Majid
—		(Indonesia) IDN	Roki
—	GK	(Indonesia) IDN	Aldi Maulana

No.	Pos.	Nation	Player
—	DF	(Indonesia) IDN	Acil Nurgraha
—		(Indonesia) IDN	Muhammad Riki
—		(Indonesia) IDN	Ahmad Rifa'i
—		(Indonesia) IDN	Ilham Nawawi
—		(Indonesia) IDN	Reza Bayu
19	MF	(Indonesia) IDN	Asep Mario (captain)
—		(Indonesia) IDN	Andi Wahyudi
—	DF	(Indonesia) IDN	Rio Ramanda
—		(Indonesia) IDN	Adios Jr
—		(Indonesia) IDN	Fay Leonard
—		(Indonesia) IDN	Anang Setiawan

== Kit suppliers ==
- Vilour (2009–2010)
- Diadora (2010–2011)
- Yansport (2018–present)
