= Serang Regency =

Regency in Banten, Indonesia

Serang Regency Kabupaten Serang
- Regency

Other transcription(s)
  - Javanese: ꦏꦧꦸꦥꦠꦺꦤ꧀ꦱꦼꦫꦁ
  - Sundanese: ᮊᮘᮥᮕᮒᮦᮔ᮪ ᮞᮦᮛᮀ
- Coat of arms
- Motto: Sepi Ing Pamrih Rame Ing Gawe (Selfless by Actions, High in Efforts)
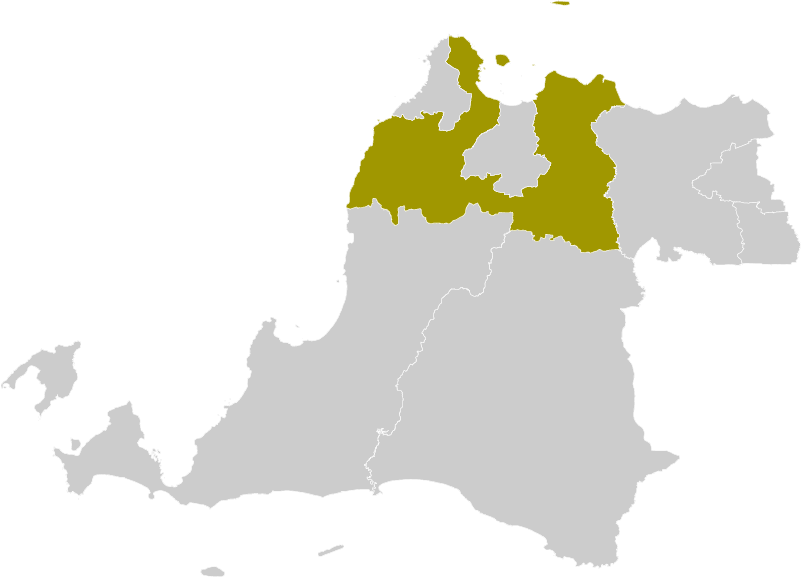
- Serang Regency (magenta) in Banten Province

- Location of Serang Regency on Java Island in Indonesia, facing Sunda Strait and Sumatra
- Coordinates: 6.15°S 106°E
- Country: Indonesia
- Province: Banten
- Regency seat: Ciruas

Government
  - Regent: Ratu Rachmatuzakiyah
  - Vice Regent: Najib Hamas

Area
  - Total: 1,469.92 km^{2} (567.54 sq mi)

Population (mid 2024 estimate)
  - Total: 1,701,803
  - Density: 1,157.75/km^{2} (2,998.56/sq mi)
- Time zone: UTC+7 (WIB)
- Website: serangkab.go.id

Serang Regency (Sundanese: ᮞᮨᮛᮀ) is a regency of Banten province, Indonesia. It is located in the northwest corner of the island of Java. The administrative center of the regency is at Ciruas, while the capital of the province is the independent municipality of Serang (Kota Serang) which was split off the regency on 17 July 2007.

Serang municipality is about 10 km from Old Banten, the eponymous former sultanate's capital. Merak, a major port and ferry terminal, is located at the northwest tip of Java, within the independent municipality of Cilegon, which was split off from the regency on 20 April 1999. Serang Regency and its semi-enclaved cities have experienced a heavy influx of residents as Jakarta continues its outward growth; some planning agencies consider it to be part of the metropolitan area. It shares its eastern border with Tangerang Regency of Jabodetabek.

Serang Regency covers a land area of 1,469.92 km^{2}, and had a population of 1,402,818 at the 2010 Census and 1,622,630 at the 2020 Census; the official estimate as at mid 2024 was 1,701,803 (comprising 868,453 males and 833,350 females). Including Cilegon and Serang cities, both of which the regency surrounds on their landward sides, the mid 2024 population amounted to 2,892,286 inhabiting 1,899.55 km^{2}, for an overall density of 1,522.6 per km^{2}. Both Cilegon and Serang cities are semi-enclaves within Serang Regency.

Serang Regency is bounded by Java Sea to the north, Sunda Strait to the west, Tangerang Regency of Greater Jakarta to the east, Lebak Regency and Pandeglang Regency to the south.

== Administrative districts ==
As at time of the 2010 Census, the Regency was divided into twenty-eight districts (kecamatan). However, an additional district - Lebakwangi - was created in 2017 from the southeastern part of Pontang District and other neighbouring districts. The districts are tabulated below with their current areas and their populations at the 2010 Census and the 2020 Census, together with the official estimates as of mid-2024. The table also includes the locations of the district administrative centres, the number of administrative villages (all classed as desa) within each district, and its postal code.

Kode Wilayah	Name of District (kecamatan)	Area in km^{2}	Pop'n 2010 Census	Pop'n 2020 Census	Pop'n mid 2024 Estimate	Admin centre	No. of villages	Post code
36.04.31	Cinangka	123.09	53,323	60,815	63,250	Cinangka	14	42167
36.04.29	Padarincang	97.64	61,357	69,647	72,303	Padarincang	14	42168
36.04.27	Ciomas	56.61	37,101	42,771	43,669	Sukadana	11	42164
36.04.28	Pabuaran	40.08	38,005	43,155	44,807	Pasanggrahan	8	42163
36.04.33	Gunungsari	53.44	19,359	23,517	25,064	Gunungsari	7	42160
36.04.22	Baros	36.07	51,293	59,302	62,003	Baros	14	42173
36.04.19	Petir	49.22	50,134	61,896	66,381	Mekarbaru	15	42172
36.04.20	Tunjung Teja	42.40	38,933	47,101	50,119	Tunjung Jaya	9	42174
36.04.23	Cikeusal	56.29	64,872	76,980	81,301	Cikeusal	17	42175
36.04.24	Pamarayan	45.02	48,820	59,805	63,945	Pamarayan	10	42179
36.03.34	Bandung	25.79	30,540	38,418	41,502	Bandung	8	42176
36.04.26	Jawilan	44.95	52,448	59,739	65,100	Jawilan	9	42177
36.04.25	Kopo	36.51	48,183	53,552	55,143	Kopo	10	42178
36.04.15	Cikande	49.05	91,834	110,569	117,436	Cikande	13	42186
36.04.16	Kibin	30.58	67,194	61,020	61,432	Ciagel	9	42185
36.04.11	Kragilan	38.05	79,627	80,302	82,291	Kragilan	12	42184
36.04.06	Waringinkurung	46.33	41,290	48,859	51,546	Waringin Kuning	11	42453
36.04.32	Mancak	97.94	43,275	48,247	49,740	Labuan	14	42165
36.04.30	Anyar	67.90	51,124	58,726	61,247	Anyar	12	42166
36.04.07	Bojonegara	36.97	41,526	50,286	53,527	Bojonegara	11	42454
36.04.08	Pulo Ampel ^{(a)}	45.99	34,098	39,297	41,036	Sumuranja	9	42455
36.04.05	Kramatwatu	56.56	87,326	100,119	104,340	Kramatwatu	15	42161
36.04.09	Ciruas	33.62	79,500	82,622	86,509	Citerep	15	42182
36.04.12	Pontang	60.39	48,582	47,248	50,508	Pontang	11	42192
36.04.35	Lebakwangi	34.74	^{(b)}	38,893	41,147	Teras Bendung	10	42181
36.04.17	Carenang	29.07	41,303	39,362	41,587	Panenjoan	8	42195
36.04.18	Binuang	28.72	27,359	31,739	33,228	Binuang	7	42196
36.04.13	Tirtayasa	59.70	37,816	46,349	49,568	Tirtayasa	14	42193
36.04.14	Tanara	47.21	36,897	42,294	44,074	Cerukcuk	9	42194
	Totals	1,469.92	1,402,818	1,622,630	1,701,803		326	

Note: (a) including offshore Panjang Island (7.4 km^{2}) with 3,420 inhabitants in 2023.
(b) the 2010 population on the new Lebakwangi District is included in the figures for the districts from which it was cut out.
