= Cilegon =

City in Banten, Indonesia

- City
- City of Cilegon; Kota Cilegon

Name transcription(s)
  - Javanese: ꦏꦶꦛꦕꦶꦭꦺꦒꦺꦴꦤ꧀
  - Sundanese: ᮓᮚᮩᮂ ᮎᮤᮜᮨᮌᮧᮔ᮪
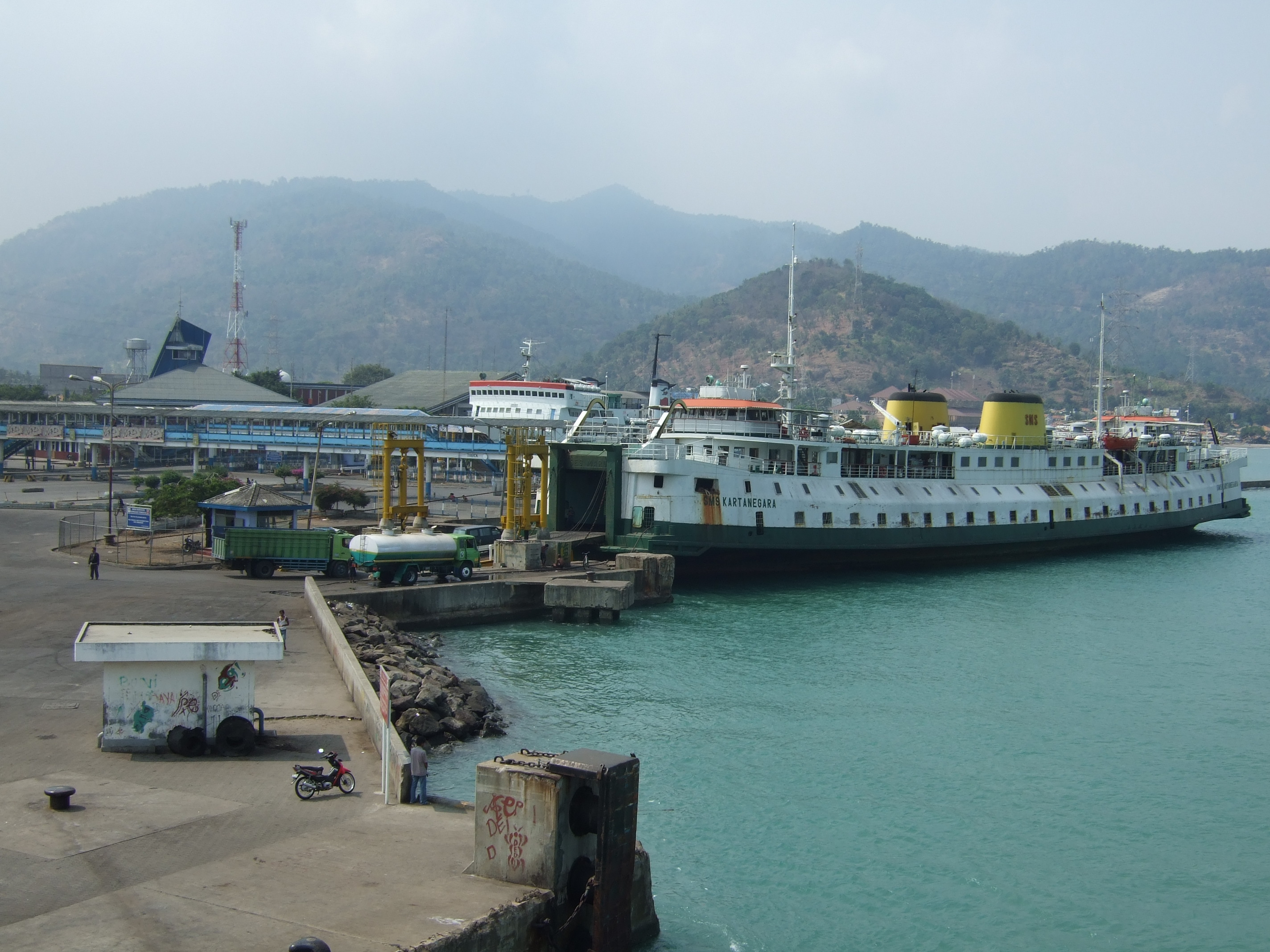
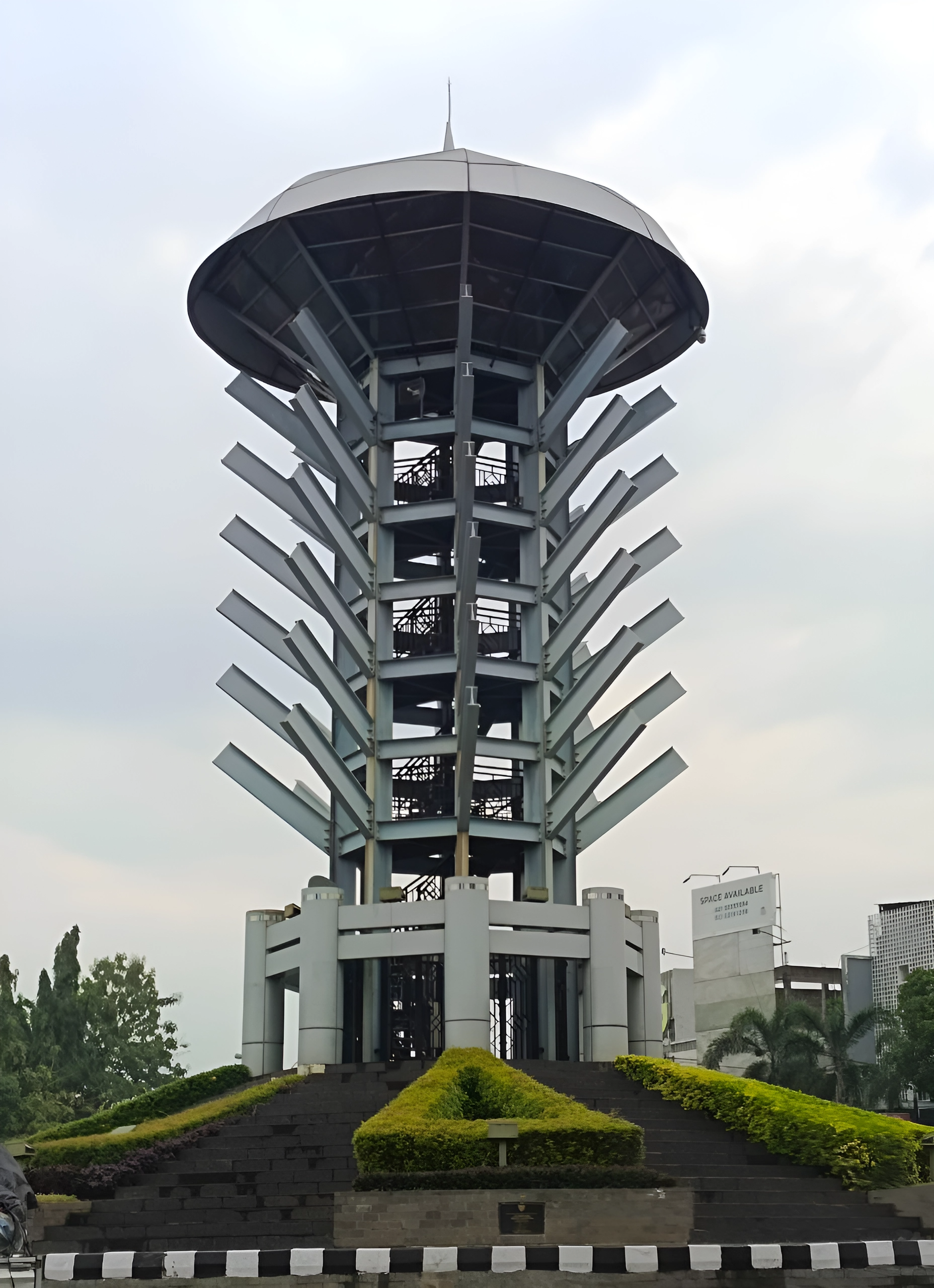
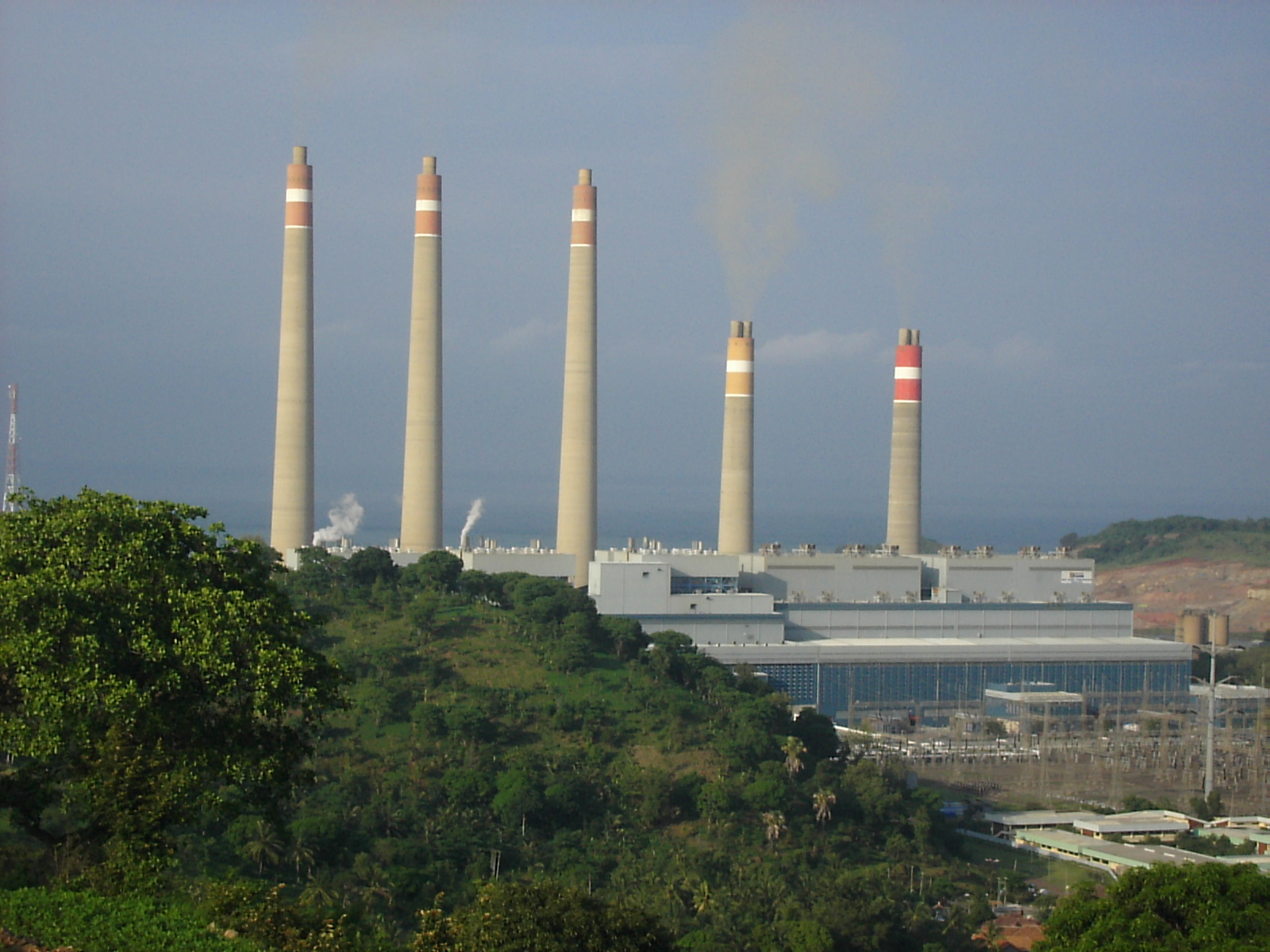
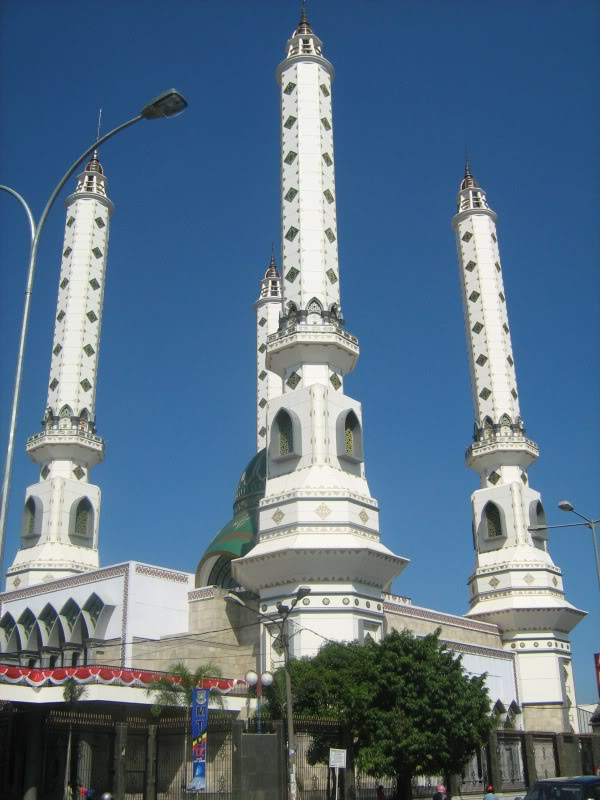
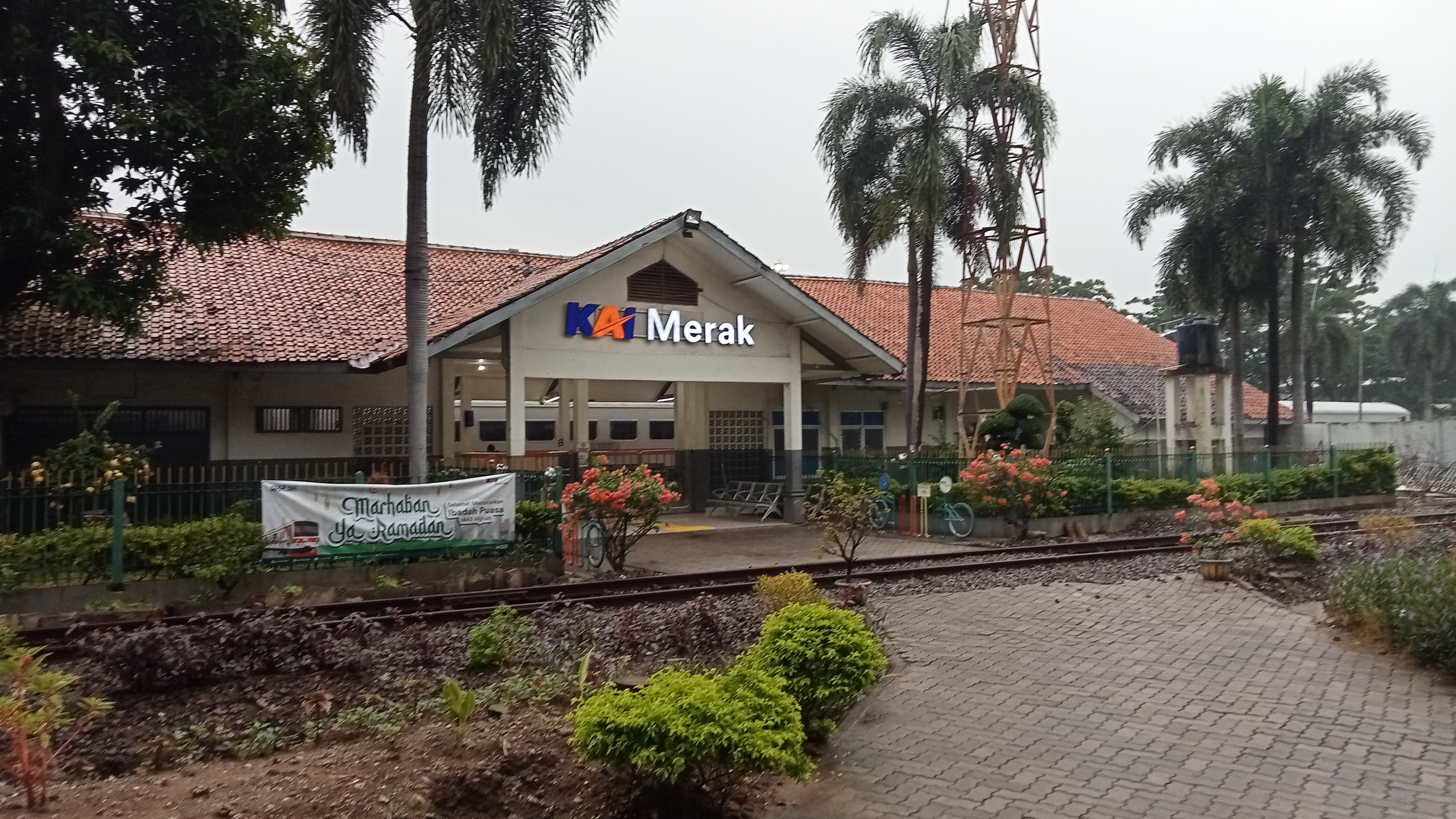
- From top, left to right: Port of Merak; Tugu Kota Cilegon; Suralaya Steam–electric power station; Grand Mosque of Cilegon; Merak Rail station

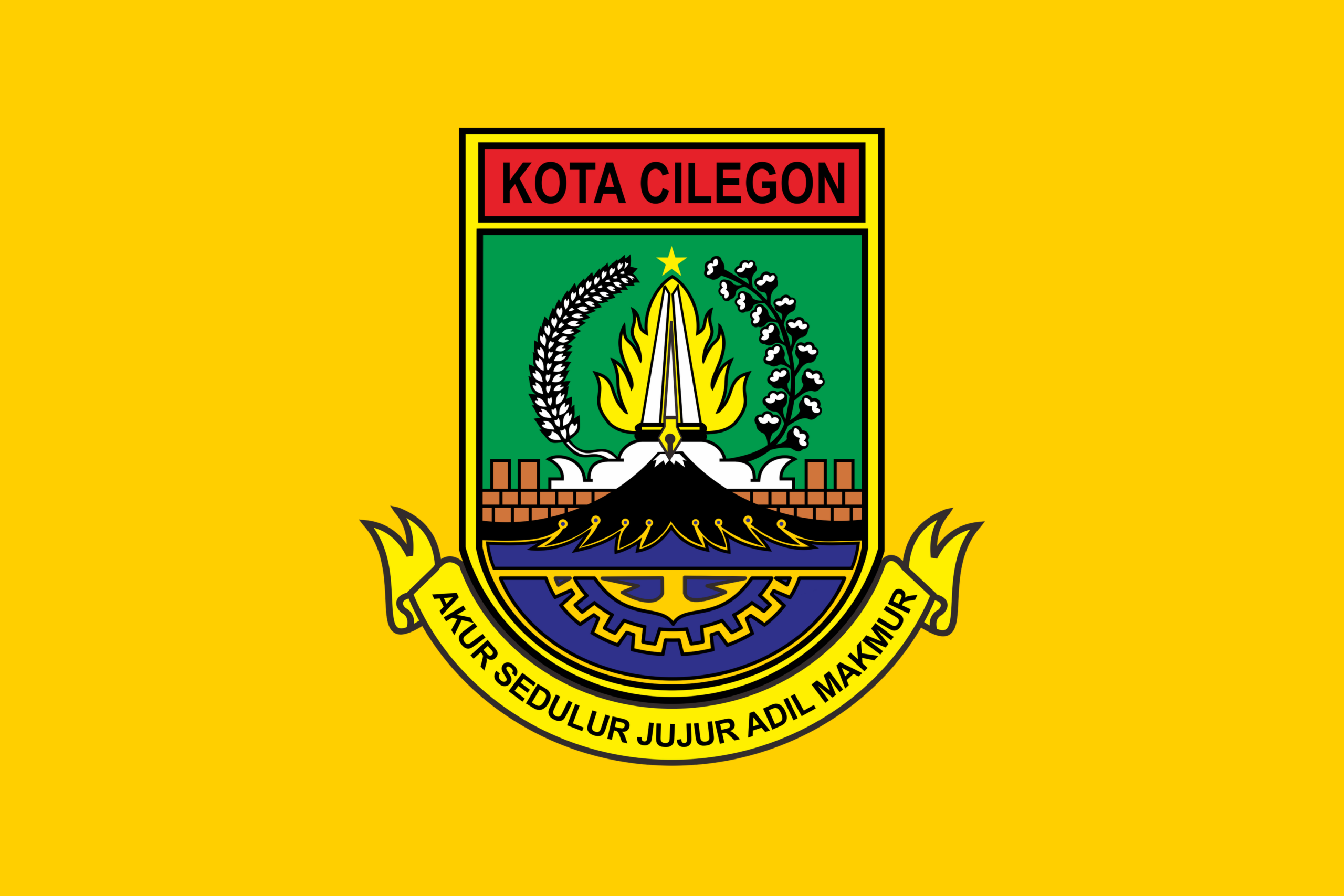
- Flag Coat of arms
- Nickname: Steel City
- Motto: Akur Sedulur Jujur Adil Makmur (Get along with fellows; honest, fair, and prosperous)
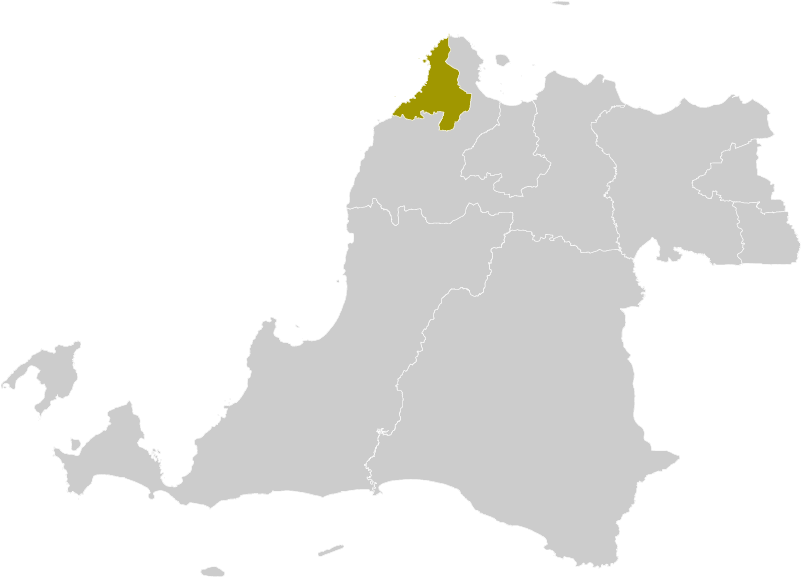
- Location within Banten

- Location in Java and Indonesia Cilegon (Indonesia)
- Coordinates: 6.002685°S 106.011202°E
- Country: Indonesia
- Province: Banten
- Administrative City: 1987
- Municipality: 27 April 1999
- City: 4 September 1999

Government
  - Mayor: Robinsar
  - Vice Mayor: Fajar Hadi Prabowo

Area
  - Total: 162.51 km^{2} (62.75 sq mi)
- Elevation: 14 m (46 ft)

Population (mid 2023 estimate)
  - Total: 470,378
  - Density: 2,894.5/km^{2} (7,496.6/sq mi)
- Time zone: UTC+7 (Indonesia Western Time)
- Postcodes: 42400
- Area code: (+62) 254
- Website: cilegon.go.id

Cilegon (Indonesian: Kota Cilegon, Indonesian pronunciation: [t͡ʃiˈləgɔn]) is a major coastal industrial city in Banten province, Indonesia, covering 162.51 km^{2} (62.75 sq mi). It is located on the island of Java. The city had a population of 374,464 at the 2010 Census and 434,896 at the 2020 Census; the official estimate as of mid-2023 was 470,378.

Among the factories located in Cilegon are the Krakatau Steel Company, a vital company in Indonesia, which produces steel for industrial (domestic and foreign) needs, and the Asahimas Chemical Company. The nickname for Cilegon is "Steel City" since the city is the largest steel producer in Southeast Asia, about 6 million tons of steel produced each year in the Industrial Area Krakatau Steel, Cilegon. Additionally Cilegon is one of the vital assets of the state, because in this town there is a wide range of important objects such as the Merak Harbour, the Krakatau Steel Industrial Zone (including the PT. Krakatau Steel Tbk, Asahimas, Siemens, KS - POSCO joint venture, Chandra Asri, and Pertamina), PLTU Suralaya, Power plant Krakatau, Krakatau Tirta Industrial Water Treatment Plant, the Sunda Strait Bridge Construction (Lot Plan) & Sunda Strait Industrial Zones.

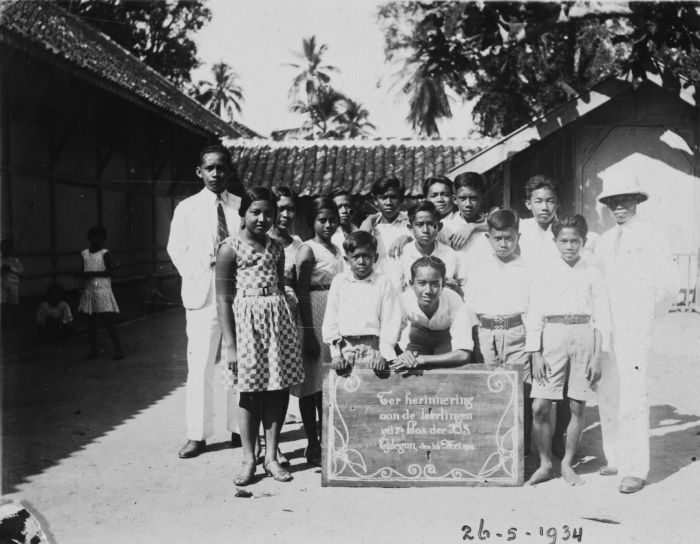
Photos of Groepsportret van leerlingen van de H.I.S. in Tjilegon (Cilegon), West-Java.

== Geography ==
Cilegon is located on the most northwest coast of Java island, at the mouth of the Cilegon River on Ciwandan Bay, which is an inlet of the Sunda Strait. It is administratively a semi-enclave within Serang Regency, as it borders with Serang Regency in the east and south, while it borders with Sunda Strait in the north and west.

== Administrative districts ==
The City of Cilegon is divided into eight districts (kecamatan), tabulated below with their areas and their populations at the 2010 Census and the 2020 Census, together with the official estimates as of mid-2023. The table also includes the locations of the district administrative centres, the number of administrative villages (all classed as urban kelurahan) in each district, and its postal codes.

Kode Wilayah	of District (kecamatan)	Area in km^{2}	Pop'n Census 2010	Pop'n Census 2020	Pop'n Estimate mid 2023	Admin centre	No. of villages	Post codes
36.72.04	Ciwandan	33.33	42,921	50,058	53,574	Tegal Ratu	6	42441 - 42447
36.72.08	Citangkil	25.90	65,073	79,903	85,850	Kebonsari	7	42441 - 42444
36.72.03	Pulomerak ^{(a)}	25.70	43,060	48,373	50,791	Lebak Gede	4	42431 - 42439
36.72.07	Purwakarta	16.60	38,479	42,658	44,048	Purwakarta	6	42431 - 42437
36.72.06	Grogol	23.71	38,538	42,442	46,134	Rawa Arum	4	42436 - 42438
36.72.02	Cilegon (district)	8.21	39,465	46,327	53,199	Ciwaduk	5	42415 - 42419
36.72.05	Jombang	10.31	60,415	65,431	71,730	Jombang Wetan	5	42411 - 42416
36.72.01	Cibeber	18.80	46,608	59,704	65,052	Kalitimbang	6	42422 - 42427
	Totals	162.51	374,464	434,896	470,378		43	

Notes: (a) including 5 small offshore islands.

== Climate ==
Cilegon has a hot and humid climate near the boundary between tropical rainforest (Af) and tropical monsoon climate (Am) according to the Köppen climate classification system. Despite being located relatively close to the equator, the city has distinct wet and dry seasons. The wet season in Cilegon covers the majority of the year, running from October through May. The remaining four months forms the city's dry season. Located in the most western part of Java, Cilegon's wet season rainfall peak is January with average monthly rainfall of 319 millimetres (12.6 in), and its dry season low point is August with a monthly average of 71 millimetres (2.8 in).

Climate data for Cilegon
Month	Jan	Feb	Mar	Apr	May	Jun	Jul	Aug	Sep	Oct	Nov	Dec	Year
Mean daily maximum °C (°F)	30.6 (87.1)	31.1 (88.0)	31.6 (88.9)	32.2 (90.0)	32.5 (90.5)	32.4 (90.3)	32.4 (90.3)	32.4 (90.3)	32.8 (91.0)	33.0 (91.4)	32.6 (90.7)	31.8 (89.2)	32.1 (89.8)
Daily mean °C (°F)	26.6 (79.9)	26.9 (80.4)	27.2 (81.0)	27.5 (81.5)	27.7 (81.9)	27.4 (81.3)	27.1 (80.8)	27.0 (80.6)	27.4 (81.3)	27.8 (82.0)	27.7 (81.9)	27.4 (81.3)	27.3 (81.2)
Mean daily minimum °C (°F)	22.7 (72.9)	22.8 (73.0)	22.8 (73.0)	22.9 (73.2)	23.0 (73.4)	22.4 (72.3)	21.9 (71.4)	21.7 (71.1)	22.1 (71.8)	22.6 (72.7)	22.9 (73.2)	23.0 (73.4)	22.6 (72.6)
Average rainfall mm (inches)	319 (12.6)	269 (10.6)	209 (8.2)	157 (6.2)	129 (5.1)	94 (3.7)	80 (3.1)	71 (2.8)	73 (2.9)	116 (4.6)	169 (6.7)	240 (9.4)	1,926 (75.9)
Source: Climate-Data.org

== Demographics ==
From 1991 to 2005 the population of Cilegon grew 47.18%, an average of 2.66% per year. Cilegon is the fourth largest city in Banten. The high population growth rate of Cilegon is primarily caused by migrants entering the city.

=== Religious discrimination ===
In 2019 there are 382 mosques and 287 musallas in Cilegon, without any churches, Hindu temples, or Buddhist viharas, even though there are 6,740 Protestants, 1,743 Catholics, 215 Hindus, 215 Buddhists, and 7 Confucians in the city. A proposal to build a Batak Protestant Christian Church in Cilegon was rejected by local residents, which forces religious services to be conducted in Serang.

== Media ==
=== Newspaper ===
- Radar Banten (Jawa Pos)

=== Radio ===
- 91.8 Top FM Cilegon
- 95.3 FM Banten Radio
- 96.9 FM Sam Radio
- 102.0 Cilegon Mandiri FM (Siaran Pemda)
- 105.2 Cilegon Pass FM
- 107.7 Gema Suara Tercinta
- 107.9 Flash Radio FM

== Education ==
- SMP Negeri 1
- SMPIT Raudhatul Jannah Cilegon
- SMK Negeri 1 Cilegon
