= 2017 Soeratin Cup =

Pertamina Soeratin Cup

Tournament details
- Country: Indonesia
- Dates: 14 October – 28 October 2017
- Teams: U-17: 31 (1 withdrew); U-15: 27 (3 withdrew)

Final positions
- Champions: U-17: PKN Penajam Utama; U-15: Askot Bandung
- Runner-up: U-17: Persita Tangerang; U-15: PSSA Asahan
- Third place: U-17: PSS Sleman; U-15: Asprov Yogyakarta
- Fourth place: U-15: Askot Tangerang

Tournament statistics
- Matches played: 110
- Goals scored: 422 (3.84 per match)
- Top goal scorer(s): U-17: Muhammad Ramli; U-15: Bagus Kahfi

Awards
- Best player: U-17: Muhammad Ramli; U-15: Muhammad Talaouhu

The 2017 Soeratin Cup (also known as the Pertamina Soeratin Cup for sponsorship reasons) season is a football competition which is intended for footballers under the age of seventeen and fifteen. The national round started on 14 October 2017.

Persab Brebes are the defending champion for U-17. PKN Penajam Utama won the title of U-17 on 28 October 2017 after defeating Persita Tangerang 3–2 at the final. Askot Bandung won the title of U-15 on 28 October 2017 after defeating PSSA Asahan 4–1 at the final.

== Format ==
Each Provincial Association only given one representative to the national round. 30 teams will perform in the national round of under-15 and 32 teams in under-17, consist of teams of provincial competition winners. National round took place in Magelang, Central Java and Special Region of Yogyakarta.

== Teams ==
=== U-17 ===
#	Province	Teams
Sumatra Region
1	Aceh	PS Kuala Nanggroe
2	North Sumatra	PSMS Medan
3	West Sumatra	Semen Padang
4	Riau	Tiga Naga
5	Riau Islands	PS Bintan
6	Jambi	Siginjai Sakti
7	Bangka-Belitung	PS East Belitung
8	South Sumatra	PS East OKU
9	Bengkulu	Indonesia Muda
10	Lampung	PS Tanggamus
Java Region
1	Banten	Persita Tangerang
2	Jakarta	Trisakti
3	West Java	Patriot Chandrabhaga
4	Central Java	Persiku Kudus
5	Yogyakarta	PSS Sleman
6	East Java	Persid Jember
Kalimantan Region
1	South Kalimantan	Peseban Banjarmasin
2	West Kalimantan	Gabsis Sambas
3	Central Kalimantan	Persebun Pangkalan Bun
4	East Kalimantan	PKN Penajam Utama
5	North Kalimantan	Malinau
Sulawesi Region
1	North Sulawesi	Bintang Muda Matali
2	South Sulawesi	Persigowa Gowa
3	Central Sulawesi	Celebest
4	West Sulawesi	PS Sandeq Polman
5	Southeast Sulawesi	Did not participate
6	Gorontalo	Boliyo Huto
Bali and Nusra Region
1	Bali	PS Badung
2	East Nusa Tenggara	Persewa Waingapu
3	West Nusa Tenggara	Persisum Sumbawa
Maluku Region
1	Maluku	Tulehu Putra
2	North Maluku	Persiter Ternate
Papua Region
1	West Papua	Did not participate
2	Papua	Persidafon Jayapura

=== U-15 ===
#	Province	Teams
Sumatra Region
1	Aceh	Persimura Idie
2	North Sumatra	PSSA Asahan
3	West Sumatra	PSP Padang
4	Riau	Tiga Naga
5	Riau Islands	PS Bintan
6	Jambi	IKM
7	Bangka-Belitung	PS West Bangka
8	South Sumatra	Persimura Musi Rawas
9	Bengkulu	PS Kaur
10	Lampung	Catur Tunggal
Java Region
1	Banten	Askot Tangerang
2	Jakarta	East Jakarta
3	West Java	Askot Bandung
4	Central Java	Pasoepati FA
5	Yogyakarta	Asprov Yogyakarta
6	East Java	Bhayangkara
Kalimantan Region
1	South Kalimantan	Peseban Banjarmasin
2	West Kalimantan	Delta Pontianak
3	Central Kalimantan	PS Kobar
4	East Kalimantan	PS Mahulu
5	North Kalimantan	PS Nunukan
Sulawesi Region
1	North Sulawesi	Askot Manado
2	South Sulawesi	Persigowa Gowa
3	Central Sulawesi	Tiswan Wani
4	West Sulawesi	PS Sandeq Polman
5	Southeast Sulawesi	Did not participate
6	Gorontalo	Did not participate
Bali and Nusra Region
1	Bali	Perseden Denpasar
2	East Nusa Tenggara	Did not participate
3	West Nusa Tenggara	PS Mataram
Maluku Region
1	Maluku	Maenahu
2	North Maluku	Persiter Ternate
Papua Region
1	West Papua	Did not participate
2	Papua	Persidafon Jayapura

== National Round ==
National round took place in Magelang, Central Java and Special Region of Yogyakarta. Two teams from each group will advance to the knockout round.

=== U-17 ===
==== Group stage ====
32 teams from each provincial association will compete. Matches for the Group Stage will be played from 14 October 2017. All group will play half season round-robin.

===== Group A =====
This group will be held in Sultan Agung Stadium, Bantul.

Pos	Team	Pld	W	D	L	GF	GA	GD	Pts	Qualification
1	Patriot Chandrabhaga (A)	3	3	0	0	11	2	+9	9	Advance to Round of 16
2	PS East OKU (A)	3	1	1	1	5	4	+1	4	Advance to Round of 16
3	Persisum Sumbawa (E)	3	0	2	1	3	7	−4	2	
4	PS Bintan (E)	3	0	1	2	2	8	−6	1	

Source: PSSI
Rules for classification: 1) points; 2) head-to-head; 3) goal difference; 4) number of goals scored.
(A) Advance to a further round; (E) Eliminated

15 October 2017
PS Bintan	1–3	PS East OKU
Persisum Sumbawa	1–5	Patriot Chandrabhaga
17 October 2017
Patriot Chandrabhaga	2–1	PS East OKU
Persisum Sumbawa	1–1	PS Bintan
19 October 2017
PS Bintan	0–4	Patriot Chandrabhaga
PS East OKU	1–1	Persisum Sumbawa

===== Group B =====
This group will be held in Sultan Agung Stadium, Bantul.

Pos	Team	Pld	W	D	L	GF	GA	GD	Pts	Qualification
1	Persid Jember (A)	3	2	1	0	12	4	+8	7	Advance to Round of 16
2	PKN Penajam Utama (A)	3	2	1	0	11	5	+6	7	Advance to Round of 16
3	PS Tanggamus (E)	3	1	0	2	9	10	−1	3	
4	Persewa Waingapu (E)	3	0	0	3	1	14	−13	0	

Source: PSSI
Rules for classification: 1) points; 2) head-to-head; 3) goal difference; 4) number of goals scored.
(A) Advance to a further round; (E) Eliminated

16 October 2017
PS Tanggamus	2–6	Persid Jember
Persewa Waingapu	1–5	PKN Penajam Utama
18 October 2017
PKN Penajam Utama	2–2	Persid Jember
Persewa Waingapu	0–5	PS Tanggamus
20 October 2017
PS Tanggamus	2–4	PKN Penajam Utama
Persid Jember	4–0	Persewa Waingapu

===== Group C =====
This group will be held in Maguwoharjo Stadium, Sleman.

Pos	Team	Pld	W	D	L	GF	GA	GD	Pts	Qualification
1	PSS Sleman (A)	3	3	0	0	8	1	+7	9	Advance to Round of 16
2	Persebun Pangkalan Bun (A)	3	2	0	1	5	5	0	6	Advance to Round of 16
3	Tulehu Putra (E)	3	1	0	2	5	3	+2	3	
4	Peseban Banjarmasin (E)	3	0	0	3	3	12	−9	0	

Source: PSSI
Rules for classification: 1) points; 2) head-to-head; 3) goal difference; 4) number of goals scored.
(A) Advance to a further round; (E) Eliminated

14 October 2017
PSS Sleman	2–0	Persebun Pangkalan Bun
15 October 2017
Peseban Banjarmasin	0–4	Tulehu Putra
17 October 2017
Tulehu Putra	0–1	PSS Sleman
Persebun Pangkalan Bun	3–2	Peseban Banjarmasin
19 October 2017
Persebun Pangkalan Bun	2–1	Tulehu Putra
Peseban Banjarmasin	1–5	PSS Sleman

===== Group D =====
This group will be held in Maguwoharjo Stadium, Sleman.

Pos	Team	Pld	W	D	L	GF	GA	GD	Pts	Qualification
1	Persiku Kudus (A)	3	3	0	0	12	2	+10	9	Advance to Round of 16
2	Gabsis Sambas (A)	3	1	1	1	2	7	−5	4	Advance to Round of 16
3	Siginjai Sakti (E)	3	0	2	1	3	6	−3	2	
4	Persigowa Gowa (E)	3	0	1	2	4	6	−2	1	

Source: PSSI
Rules for classification: 1) points; 2) head-to-head; 3) goal difference; 4) number of goals scored.
(A) Advance to a further round; (E) Eliminated

16 October 2017
Persiku Kudus	4–1	Siginjai Sakti
Persigowa Gowa	1–2	Gabsis Sambas
18 October 2017
Gabsis Sambas	0–0	Siginjai Sakti
Persigowa Gowa	1–2	Persiku Kudus
20 October 2017
Siginjai Sakti	2–2	Persigowa Gowa
Persiku Kudus	6–0	Gabsis Sambas

===== Group E =====
This group will be held in Moch. Soebroto Stadium, Magelang.

Pos	Team	Pld	W	D	L	GF	GA	GD	Pts	Qualification
1	PSMS Medan (A)	2	2	0	0	7	2	+5	6	Advance to Round of 16
2	Malinau (A)	2	0	1	1	2	3	−1	1	Advance to Round of 16
3	PS Sandeq Polman (E)	2	0	1	1	0	4	−4	1	
4	PS Kuala Nanggroe (X)	0	0	0	0	0	0	0	0	Withdrawn

Source: PSSI
Rules for classification: 1) points; 2) head-to-head; 3) goal difference; 4) number of goals scored.
(A) Advance to a further round; (E) Eliminated; (X) Withdrawn

15 October 2017
PS Sandeq Polman	0–0	Malinau
17 October 2017
PSMS Medan	4–0	PS Sandeq Polman
19 October 2017
Malinau	2–3	PSMS Medan

===== Group F =====
This group will be held in Moch. Soebroto Stadium, Magelang.

Pos	Team	Pld	W	D	L	GF	GA	GD	Pts	Qualification
1	Persiter Ternate (A)	3	2	1	0	11	2	+9	7	Advance to Round of 16
2	PS Badung (A)	3	1	1	1	8	6	+2	4	Advance to Round of 16
3	Semen Padang (E)	3	1	1	1	8	11	−3	4	
4	Indonesia Muda (E)	3	0	1	2	4	12	−8	1	

Source: PSSI
Rules for classification: 1) points; 2) head-to-head; 3) goal difference; 4) number of goals scored.
(A) Advance to a further round; (E) Eliminated

16 October 2017
Semen Padang	6–4	Indonesia Muda
Persiter Ternate	5–1	PS Badung
18 October 2017
PS Badung	6–0	Indonesia Muda
Persiter Ternate	6–1	Semen Padang
20 October 2017
Semen Padang	1–1	PS Badung
Indonesia Muda	0–0	Persiter Ternate

===== Group G =====
This group will be held in Gemilang Stadium, Magelang Regency.

Pos	Team	Pld	W	D	L	GF	GA	GD	Pts	Qualification
1	Persita Tangerang (A)	3	3	0	0	11	1	+10	9	Advance to Round of 16
2	Persidafon Jayapura (A)	3	2	0	1	9	4	+5	6	Advance to Round of 16
3	Bintang Muda Matali (E)	3	1	0	2	4	9	−5	3	
4	PS East Belitung (E)	3	0	0	3	3	13	−10	0	

Source: PSSI
Rules for classification: 1) points; 2) head-to-head; 3) goal difference; 4) number of goals scored.
(A) Advance to a further round; (E) Eliminated

15 October 2017
Persita Tangerang	7–1	PS East Belitung
Bintang Muda Matali	1–6	Persidafon Jayapura
17 October 2017
Persidafon Jayapura	3–1	PS East Belitung
Bintang Muda Matali	0–2	Persita Tangerang
19 October 2017
PS East Belitung	1–3	Bintang Muda Matali
Persita Tangerang	2–0	Persidafon Jayapura

===== Group H =====
This group will be held in Gemilang Stadium, Magelang Regency.

Pos	Team	Pld	W	D	L	GF	GA	GD	Pts	Qualification
1	Tiga Naga (A)	3	3	0	0	4	0	+4	9	Advance to Round of 16
2	Boliyo Huto (A)	3	1	1	1	5	3	+2	4	Advance to Round of 16
3	Trisakti (E)	3	1	0	2	6	8	−2	3	
4	Celebest (E)	3	0	1	2	1	5	−4	1	

Source: PSSI
Rules for classification: 1) points; 2) head-to-head; 3) goal difference; 4) number of goals scored.
(A) Advance to a further round; (E) Eliminated

16 October 2017
Tiga Naga	1–0	Boliyo Huto
Celebest	1–4	Trisakti
18 October 2017
Celebest	0–1	Tiga Naga
Boliyo Huto	5–2	Trisakti
20 October 2017
Tiga Naga	2–0	Trisakti
Celebest	0–0	Boliyo Huto

==== Knockout stage ====
Round of 16
22 October – Magelang
PSMS Medan	1 (4)
PS Badung	1 (6)
22 October – Magelang Regency
Persita Tangerang	5
Boliyo Huto	0
22 October – Magelang Regency
Tiga Naga	1
Persidafon Jayapura	0
22 October – Magelang
Persiter Ternate	10
Malinau	1
22 October – Bantul
Patriot Chandrabhaga	2
PKN Penajam Utama	3
22 October – Sleman
Persiku Kudus	2
Persebun Pangkalan Bun	1
22 October – Sleman
PSS Sleman	3
Gabsis Sambas	0
22 October – Bantul
Persid Jember	7
PS East OKU	0

Quarter-finals
23 October – Magelang
PS Badung	0
Persita Tangerang	3
23 October – Magelang Regency
Tiga Naga	2
Persiter Ternate	3
23 October – Bantul
PKN Penajam Utama	4
Persiku Kudus	0
23 October – Sleman
PSS Sleman	3
Persid Jember	1

Semi-finals
25 October – Sleman
Persita Tangerang	DQ
Persiter Ternate
25 October – Sleman
PKN Penajam Utama	0 (4)
PSS Sleman	0 (2)

Final
28 October – Sleman
Persita Tangerang	2
PKN Penajam Utama	3

===== Round of 16 =====
22 October 2017
PSMS Medan	(4) 1–1 (6)	PS Badung	Moch. Soebroto Stadium, Magelang
22 October 2017
Persita Tangerang	5–0	Boliyo Huto	Gemilang Stadium, Magelang Regency
22 October 2017
Tiga Naga	1–0	Persidafon Jayapura	Gemilang Stadium, Magelang Regency
22 October 2017
Persiter Ternate	10–1	Malinau	Moch. Soebroto Stadium, Magelang
22 October 2017
Patriot Chandrabhaga	2–3	PKN Penajam Utama	Sultan Agung Stadium, Bantul
22 October 2017
Persiku Kudus	2–1	Persebun Pangkalan Bun	Maguwoharjo Stadium, Sleman
22 October 2017
PSS Sleman	3–0	Gabsis Sambas	Maguwoharjo Stadium, Sleman
22 October 2017
Persid Jember	7–0	PS East OKU	Sultan Agung Stadium, Bantul

===== Quarter-finals =====
23 October 2017
PS Badung	0–3	Persita Tangerang	Moch. Soebroto Stadium, Magelang
23 October 2017
Tiga Naga	2–3	Persiter Ternate	Gemilang Stadium, Magelang Regency
23 October 2017
PKN Penajam Utama	4–0	Persiku Kudus	Sultan Agung Stadium, Bantul
23 October 2017
PSS Sleman	3–1	Persid Jember	Maguwoharjo Stadium, Sleman

===== Semi-finals =====
25 October 2017
Persita Tangerang	1–2	Persiter Ternate (DQ)	Maguwoharjo Stadium, Sleman
25 October 2017
PKN Penajam Utama	(4) 0–0 (2)	PSS Sleman	Maguwoharjo Stadium, Sleman

===== Third-place =====
As Persiter Ternate disqualified from the tournament, PSS Sleman won third-place position automatically.

===== Final =====
28 October 2017
Persita Tangerang	2–3	PKN Penajam Utama	Maguwoharjo Stadium, Sleman

=== U-15 ===
==== Group stage ====
30 teams from each provincial association will compete. Matches for the Group Stage will be played from 15 October 2017. All group will play half season round-robin.

===== Group A =====
This group will be held in Dwi Windu Stadium, Bantul.

Pos	Team	Pld	W	D	L	GF	GA	GD	Pts	Qualification
1	Perseden Denpasar (A)	3	3	0	0	9	1	+8	9	Advance to Round of 16
2	Persidafon Jayapura (A)	3	1	1	1	5	4	+1	4	Advance to Round of 16
3	PS Kaur (E)	3	0	2	1	2	6	−4	2	
4	Delta Pontianak (E)	3	0	1	2	2	7	−5	1	

Source: PSSI
Rules for classification: 1) points; 2) head-to-head; 3) goal difference; 4) number of goals scored.
(A) Advance to a further round; (E) Eliminated

15 October 2017
Persidafon Jayapura	1–1	PS Kaur
Perseden Denpasar	3–0	Delta Pontianak
17 October 2017
Delta Pontianak	1–3	Persidafon Jayapura
PS Kaur	0–4	Perseden Denpasar
19 October 2017
PS Kaur	1–1	Delta Pontianak
Perseden Denpasar	2–1	Persidafon Jayapura

===== Group B =====
This group will be held in Dwi Windu Stadium, Bantul.

Pos	Team	Pld	W	D	L	GF	GA	GD	Pts	Qualification
1	Bhayangkara (A)	3	3	0	0	11	4	+7	9	Advance to Round of 16
2	PSP Padang (A)	3	2	0	1	8	5	+3	6	Advance to Round of 16
3	Persimura Idie (E)	3	1	0	2	7	5	+2	3	
4	Tiswan Wani (E)	3	0	0	3	0	12	−12	0	

Source: PSSI
Rules for classification: 1) points; 2) head-to-head; 3) goal difference; 4) number of goals scored.
(A) Advance to a further round; (E) Eliminated

16 October 2017
Tiswan Wani	0–4	Persimura Idie
Bhayangkara	4–2	PSP Padang
18 October 2017
PSP Padang	4–0	Tiswan Wani
Persimura Idie	2–3	Bhayangkara
20 October 2017
Persimura Idie	1–2	PSP Padang
Bhayangkara	4–0	Tiswan Wani

===== Group C =====
This group will be held in Abu Bakrin Stadium, Magelang.

Pos	Team	Pld	W	D	L	GF	GA	GD	Pts	Qualification
1	Pasoepati FA (A)	3	3	0	0	8	2	+6	9	Advance to Round of 16
2	PS Sandeq Polman (A)	3	1	1	1	3	4	−1	4	Advance to Round of 16
3	PS Mataram (E)	3	1	0	2	5	6	−1	3	
4	PS Bintan (E)	3	0	1	2	2	6	−4	1	

Source: PSSI
Rules for classification: 1) points; 2) head-to-head; 3) goal difference; 4) number of goals scored.
(A) Advance to a further round; (E) Eliminated

15 October 2017
PS Sandeq Polman	1–1	PS Bintan
Pasoepati FA	4–1	PS Mataram
17 October 2017
Pasoepati FA	2–0	PS Sandeq Polman
PS Mataram	3–0	PS Bintan
19 October 2017
PS Mataram	1–2	PS Sandeq Polman
PS Bintan	1–2	Pasoepati FA

===== Group D =====
This group will be held in Abu Bakrin Stadium, Magelang.

Pos	Team	Pld	W	D	L	GF	GA	GD	Pts	Qualification
1	Askot Tangerang (A)	1	1	0	0	2	1	+1	3	Advance to Round of 16
2	Askot Bandung (A)	1	0	0	1	1	2	−1	0	Advance to Round of 16
3	Catur Tunggal (X)	0	0	0	0	0	0	0	0	Withdrawn
4	Askot Manado (X)	0	0	0	0	0	0	0	0	Withdrawn

Source: PSSI
Rules for classification: 1) points; 2) head-to-head; 3) goal difference; 4) number of goals scored.
(A) Advance to a further round; (X) Withdrawn

16 October 2017
Askot Bandung	1–2	Askot Tangerang

===== Group E =====
This group will be held in Tridadi Stadium, Sleman.

Pos	Team	Pld	W	D	L	GF	GA	GD	Pts	Qualification
1	Asprov Yogyakarta (A)	2	2	0	0	11	1	+10	6	Advance to Round of 16
2	Persigowa Gowa (A)	2	1	0	1	2	5	−3	3	Advance to Round of 16
3	Maenahu (E)	2	0	0	2	0	7	−7	0	
4	PS Nunukan (X)	0	0	0	0	0	0	0	0	Withdrawn

Source: PSSI
Rules for classification: 1) points; 2) head-to-head; 3) goal difference; 4) number of goals scored.
(A) Advance to a further round; (E) Eliminated; (X) Withdrawn

15 October 2017
Persigowa Gowa	1–5	Asprov Yogyakarta
17 October 2017
Maenahu	0–1	Persigowa Gowa
19 October 2017
Asprov Yogyakarta	6–0	Maenahu

===== Group F =====
This group will be held in Tridadi Stadium, Sleman.

Pos	Team	Pld	W	D	L	GF	GA	GD	Pts	Qualification
1	PSSA Asahan (A)	3	3	0	0	17	0	+17	9	Advance to Round of 16
2	PS Mahulu (A)	3	2	0	1	3	8	−5	6	Advance to Round of 16
3	Peseban Banjarmasin (E)	3	0	1	2	0	5	−5	1	
4	IKM (E)	3	0	1	2	0	7	−7	1	

Source: PSSI
Rules for classification: 1) points; 2) head-to-head; 3) goal difference; 4) number of goals scored.
(A) Advance to a further round; (E) Eliminated

17 October 2017
Peseban Banjarmasin	0–0	IKM
PS Mahulu	0–8	PSSA Asahan
18 October 2017
PSSA Asahan	3–0	Peseban Banjarmasin
IKM	0–1	PS Mahulu
20 October 2017
IKM	0–6	PSSA Asahan
PS Mahulu	2–0	Peseban Banjarmasin

===== Group G =====
This group will be held in Yogyakarta State University Stadium, Yogyakarta.

Pos	Team	Pld	W	D	L	GF	GA	GD	Pts	Qualification
1	Persiter Ternate (A)	2	2	0	0	12	1	+11	6	Advance to Round of 16
2	PS Kobar (A)	2	0	1	1	2	7	−5	1	Advance to Round of 16
3	PS West Bangka (E)	2	0	1	1	1	7	−6	1	

Source: PSSI
Rules for classification: 1) points; 2) head-to-head; 3) goal difference; 4) number of goals scored.
(A) Advance to a further round; (E) Eliminated

15 October 2017
PS Kobar	1–6	Persiter Ternate
17 October 2017
PS West Bangka	1–1	PS Kobar
19 October 2017
Persiter Ternate	6–0	PS West Bangka

===== Group H =====
This group will be held in Yogyakarta State University Stadium, Yogyakarta.

Pos	Team	Pld	W	D	L	GF	GA	GD	Pts	Qualification
1	East Jakarta (A)	2	2	0	0	5	2	+3	6	Advance to Round of 16
2	Persimura Musi Rawas (A)	2	0	1	1	4	5	−1	1	Advance to Round of 16
3	Tiga Naga (E)	2	0	1	1	2	4	−2	1	

Source: PSSI
Rules for classification: 1) points; 2) head-to-head; 3) goal difference; 4) number of goals scored.
(A) Advance to a further round; (E) Eliminated

16 October 2017
Tiga Naga	0–2	East Jakarta
18 October 2017
Persimura Musi Rawas	2–2	Tiga Naga
20 October 2017
East Jakarta	3–2	Persimura Musi Rawas

==== Knockout stage ====
Round of 16
22 October – Bantul
Perseden Denpasar	1
PSP Padang	2
22 October – Magelang
Askot Tangerang	3
PS Sandeq Polman	0
22 October – Magelang
Pasoepati FA	1
Askot Bandung	4
22 October – Bantul
Bhayangkara	4
Persidafon Jayapura	2
22 October – Sleman
Asprov Yogyakarta	1
PS Mahulu	0
22 October – Yogyakarta
Persiter Ternate	0
Persimura Musi Rawas	1
22 October – Yogyakarta
East Jakarta	2
PS Kobar	0
22 October – Sleman
PSSA Asahan	4
Persigowa Gowa	0

Quarter-finals
24 October – Bantul
PSP Padang	0
Askot Tangerang	1
24 October – Magelang
Askot Bandung	4
Bhayangkara	2
24 October – Sleman
Asprov Yogyakarta	4
Persimura Musi Rawas	1
24 October – Yogyakarta
East Jakarta	3
PSSA Asahan	4

Semi-finals
26 October – Bantul
Askot Tangerang	0
Askot Bandung	4
26 October – Bantul
Asprov Yogyakarta	1
PSSA Asahan	3

Final
28 October – Sleman
Askot Bandung	4
PSSA Asahan	1
Third place
27 October – Sleman
Askot Tangerang	1
Asprov Yogyakarta	2

===== Round of 16 =====
22 October 2017
Perseden Denpasar	1–2	PSP Padang	Dwi Windu Stadium, Bantul
22 October 2017
Askot Tangerang	3–0	PS Sandeq Polman	Abu Bakrin Stadium, Magelang
22 October 2017
Pasoepati FA	1–4	Askot Bandung	Abu Bakrin Stadium, Magelang
22 October 2017
Bhayangkara	4–2	Persidafon Jayapura	Dwi Windu Stadium, Bantul
22 October 2017
Asprov Yogyakarta	1–0	PS Mahulu	Tridadi Stadium, Sleman
22 October 2017
Persiter Ternate	0–1	Persimura Musi Rawas	Yogyakarta State University Stadium, Yogyakarta
22 October 2017
East Jakarta	2–0	PS Kobar	Yogyakarta State University Stadium, Yogyakarta
22 October 2017
PSSA Asahan	4–0	Persigowa Gowa	Tridadi Stadium, Sleman

===== Quarter-finals =====
24 October 2017
PSP Padang	0–1	Askot Tangerang	Dwi Windu Stadium, Bantul
24 October 2017
Askot Bandung	4–2	Bhayangkara	Abu Bakrin Stadium, Magelang
24 October 2017
Asprov Yogyakarta	4–1	Persimura Musi Rawas	Tridadi Stadium, Sleman
24 October 2017
East Jakarta	3–4	PSSA Asahan	Yogyakarta State University Stadium, Yogyakarta

===== Semi-finals =====
26 October 2017
Askot Tangerang	0–4	Askot Bandung	Sultan Agung Stadium, Bantul
26 October 2017
Asprov Yogyakarta	1–3	PSSA Asahan	Sultan Agung Stadium, Bantul

===== Third-place =====
27 October 2017
Askot Tangerang	1–2	Asprov Yogyakarta	Maguwoharjo Stadium, Sleman

===== Final =====
28 October 2017
Askot Bandung	4–1	PSSA Asahan	Maguwoharjo Stadium, Sleman

== See also ==
- 2017 Liga 1
- 2017 Liga 2
- 2017 Liga 3
- 2017 Indonesia President's Cup
- 2017 Liga 1 U-19
