= Purwodadi =

Purwodadi is the name of several towns and districts in Indonesia:

- Purwodadi, Grobogan, a town and district in Grobogan Regency
- Purwodadi, Purworejo, a district in Purworejo Regency
- Purwodadi, Musi Rawas, a district in Musi Rawas Regency
- Purwodadi, Blimbing, a sub-district in Blimbing, Malang City
