= Tanjung Batu =

Tanjung Batu (Cape Batu, literally "Cape Rock" in Indonesian and Malaysian) may refer to:

== Indonesia ==
- Tanjung Batu, Donggala Regency, a village in Central Sulawesi
- Tanjung Batu, a city on Kundur Island, Riau Islands Province
- Tanjung Batu, a subdistrict of South Sumatra
- Tanjung Batu beach, Ketapang
- Tanjung Batu beach, Pemangkat

== Malaysia ==
- Tanjung Batu (Sabah state constituency)
- Tanjung Batu, the coastal area of Bintulu in Sarawak
