= 2017 Liga 3 final =

- Event: 2017 Liga 3
Persik Kendal	Blitar United
1	2
- Date: 17 December 2017
- Venue: Gelora Bumi Kartini Stadium, Jepara

The 2017 Liga 3 final is a football match to determine the winner of the 2017 Liga 3 between Persik Kendal and Blitar United. The match will held on 17 December 2017 at Gelora Bumi Kartini Stadium, Jepara.

== Route to the final ==
Persik Kendal		Round	Blitar United	
Opponent	Result	Group stage	Opponent	Result
Maung Anom	0–1	Matchday 1	Persimura Musi Rawas	0–0
Villa 2000 021 Jakarta	3–0	Matchday 2	PS Bangka Selection	7–0
Pespessel South Coast	4–0	Matchday 3	Persis GR	1–1
Opponent	Result	Knockout phase	Opponent	Result
Deltras Sidoarjo	3–1	Round of 16	Persekabpas Pasuruan	1–0
Persitangsel South Tangerang	2–0	Quarter-finals	Persimura Musi Rawas	3–1
Aceh United	2–1	Semi-finals	PSAD Kodam VI/MLW Balikpapan	1–0

== Match ==
17 December 2017
(UTC+7:00) 18:30

Persik Kendal	1–2	Blitar United
M. Alaik 35'	Report	Guntur 28'; Diego 73'

Gelora Bumi Kartini Stadium, Jepara
