= 2017 Liga 3 (Indonesia) =

Liga 3
- Season: 2017
- Dates: 28 November – 17 December 2017
- Champions: Blitar United (1st title)
- Promoted: Blitar United; Persik Kendal; Aceh United
- Matches: 85
- Goals: 236 (2.78 per match)
- Best Player: Assanur Rijal
- Top goalscorer: Arianto (7 goals)
- Highest scoring: Play-off; Persiter 11–0 PS Balangan (30 November 2017); National round PES Pessel 1–6 Maung Anom (5 December 2017); PS Bangka Sel. 0–7 Blitar Utd. (6 December 2017)

The 2017 Liga 3 season was the 2nd season of lower-tier and the inaugural season of the third-tier competition in Indonesia with the new name Liga 3.

Persatu Tuban, winner of the 2014 Liga Nusantara are the defending champions, as the 2015 Liga Nusantara was not held and the 2016 ISC Liga Nusantara was not counted as an official league.

Blitar United won the title after a 2–1 win over Persik Kendal in 2017 Liga 3 Final at Gelora Bumi Kartini Stadium, Jepara on 17 December 2017.

== Format ==
National round took place in several provinces that have been determined by PT Liga Indonesia Baru with the following format:

- Play-off round contains 24 teams divided into eight groups. The winner from each group advanced to the National round.
- National round contains 32 teams divided into eight groups. Two teams from each group advanced to the knockout round.

== Teams ==
Each Provincial Association held their Provincial League (Regional round) followed by unlimited teams and the winner advanced to National round or Play-off round. Each Provincial Association only given 1 to 4 representatives to the National round or Play-off round based on rate of their Provincial League competitiveness. Regional round start at 12 April 2017 in Central Java Province.

=== Regional round winners ===
#	Regional	Qualified teams	
#	Regional	National round	Play-off round
Sumatra Region
1	Aceh	Kuala Nanggroe	Aceh United
2	North Sumatra	PSDS Deli Serdang	PS Keluarga USU
3	West Sumatra	Batang Anai	PES Pessel South Coast
4	Riau	Nabil	—
5	Riau Islands	—	PS Bintan
6	Jambi	—	Persijam Jambi
7	South Sumatra	—	Persimura Musi Rawas
8	Bangka Belitung Islands	PS Bangka Selection	PS Beltim East Belitung
9	Bengkulu	—	PS Benteng Central Bengkulu
10	Lampung	Persilat Central Lampung	SS Lampung
Java Region
11	Banten	—	Persitangsel South Tangerang
12	Jakarta	Villa 2000 021 Jakarta	Bintang Kranggan
13	West Java	PSKC Cimahi; Maung Anom	Patriot Candrabhaga
14	Central Java	Persik Kendal; Persis GR	—
15	(Special Region of Yogyakarta) Yogyakarta	Satria Adikarta	Gama
16	East Java	Blitar United; Persibo Bojonegoro; Deltras Sidoarjo; Persekabpas Pasuruan	—
Kalimantan Region
17	West Kalimantan	—	Persibeng Bengkayang
18	Central Kalimantan	—	Persegumas Gunung Mas
19	South Kalimantan	Peseban Banjarmasin	PS Balangan
20	East Kalimantan	PSAD Kodam VI/MLW Balikpapan	—
21	North Kalimantan	Pelangi Intimung	—
Sulawesi Region
22	North Sulawesi	Persbit Bitung; PS Bank Sulut	—
23	Central Sulawesi	—	Persipal Palu
24	South Sulawesi	Sidrap United	—
25	Southeast Sulawesi	—	—
26	Gorontalo	—	Persidago Gorontalo
27	West Sulawesi	—	PS Matra North Mamuju
Lesser Sunda Islands Region
28	Bali	—	Persekaba Bali
29	West Nusa Tenggara	—	PSKT West Sumbawa
30	East Nusa Tenggara	Perse Ende	—
Maluku and Papua Region
31	(Maluku (province)) Maluku	—	Pelauw Putra
32	North Maluku	—	Persiter Ternate
33	(West Papua (province)) West Papua	—	—
34	(Papua (province)) Papua	Persewar Waropen	Persintan Intan Jaya

== Play-off round ==
There are 24 teams entered this round divided into 8 groups and played on 28 November-1 December 2017. The winners from each group advanced to National round.

=== Group 1 ===
All matches were held in Citarum Stadium, Semarang.

Pos	Team	Pld	W	D	L	GF	GA	GD	Pts	Qualification
1	PS Matra North Mamuju	2	2	0	0	3	0	+3	6	Qualification to National round group A
2	PS Beltim East Belitung	2	1	0	1	2	1	+1	3	
3	Persibeng Bengkayang	2	0	0	2	1	3	−2	0	

Source: PSSI

28 November 2017
Persibeng Bengkayang	0–1	PS Matra North Mamuju
29 November 2017
PS Beltim East Belitung	2–1	Persibeng Bengkayang
30 November 2017
PS Matra North Mamuju	2–0	PS Beltim East Belitung

=== Group 2 ===
All matches were held in Citarum Stadium, Semarang.

Pos	Team	Pld	W	D	L	GF	GA	GD	Pts	Qualification
1	Aceh United	2	2	0	0	4	1	+3	6	Qualification to National round group B
2	PS Benteng Central Bengkulu	2	1	0	1	4	3	+1	3	
3	Pelauw Putra	2	0	0	2	1	5	−4	0	

Source: PSSI

28 November 2017
PS Benteng Central Bengkulu	1-2	Aceh United
30 November 2017
Pelauw Putra	1–3	PS Benteng Central Bengkulu
1 December 2017
Aceh United	2–0	Pelauw Putra

=== Group 3 ===
All matches were held in Kebon Dalem Stadium, Kendal.

Pos	Team	Pld	W	D	L	GF	GA	GD	Pts	Qualification
1	PES Pessel South Coast	2	1	1	0	2	1	+1	4	Qualification to National round group C
2	Gama	2	1	1	0	2	1	+1	4	
3	Patriot Candrabhaga	2	0	0	2	0	2	−2	0	

Source: PSSI

28 November 2017
Patriot Candrabhaga	0–1	PES Pessel South Coast
29 November 2017
Gama	1–0	Patriot Candrabhaga
30 November 2017
PES Pessel South Coast	1–1	Gama

=== Group 4 ===
All matches were held in Kebon Dalem Stadium, Kendal.

Pos	Team	Pld	W	D	L	GF	GA	GD	Pts	Qualification
1	Persitangsel South Tangerang	2	2	0	0	9	3	+6	6	Qualification to National round group D
2	Persegumas Gunung Mas	2	1	0	1	2	5	−3	3	
3	Persidago Gorontalo	2	0	0	2	4	7	−3	0	

Source: PSSI

28 November 2017
Persidago Gorontalo	3–5	Persitangsel South Tangerang
29 November 2017
Persegumas Gunung Mas	2–1	Persidago Gorontalo
30 November 2017
Persitangsel South Tangerang	4–0	Persegumas Gunung Mas

=== Group 5 ===
All matches were held in Wergu Wetan Stadium, Kudus.

Pos	Team	Pld	W	D	L	GF	GA	GD	Pts	Qualification
1	Persiter Ternate	2	1	1	0	11	0	+11	4	Qualification to National round group E
2	Persipal Palu	2	1	1	0	5	0	+5	4	
3	PS Balangan	2	0	0	2	0	16	−16	0	

Source: PSSI

28 November 2017
Persipal Palu	0–0	Persiter Ternate
29 November 2017
PS Balangan	0–5	Persipal Palu
30 November 2017
Persiter Ternate	11–0	PS Balangan

=== Group 6 ===
All matches were held in Wergu Wetan Stadium, Kudus.

Pos	Team	Pld	W	D	L	GF	GA	GD	Pts	Qualification
1	PS Bintan	2	1	1	0	3	2	+1	4	Qualification to National round group F
2	PSKT West Sumbawa	2	1	0	1	3	3	0	3	
3	Persintan Intan Jaya	2	0	1	1	2	3	−1	1	

Source: PSSI

28 November 2017
Persintan Intan Jaya	1–1	PS Bintan
29 November 2017
PSKT West Sumbawa	2–1	Persintan Intan Jaya
30 November 2017
PS Bintan	2–1	PSKT West Sumbawa

=== Group 7 ===
All matches were held in Gelora Bumi Kartini Stadium, Jepara.

Pos	Team	Pld	W	D	L	GF	GA	GD	Pts	Qualification
1	Persijam Jambi	2	1	1	0	1	0	+1	4	Qualification to National round group G
2	Persekaba Bali	2	1	0	1	3	1	+2	3	
3	SS Lampung	2	0	1	1	0	3	−3	1	

Source: PSSI

28 November 2017
Persekaba Bali	3–0	SS Lampung
29 November 2017
Persijam Jambi	1–0	Persekaba Bali
30 November 2017
SS Lampung	0–0	Persijam Jambi

=== Group 8 ===
All matches were held in Gelora Bumi Kartini Stadium, Jepara.

Pos	Team	Pld	W	D	L	GF	GA	GD	Pts	Qualification
1	Persimura Musi Rawas	2	2	0	0	6	0	+6	6	Qualification to National round group H
2	PS Keluarga USU	2	1	0	1	2	2	0	3	
3	Bintang Kranggan	2	0	0	2	1	7	−6	0	

Source: PSSI

28 November 2017
Bintang Kranggan	0–5	Persimura Musi Rawas
29 November 2017
PS Keluarga USU	2–1	Bintang Kranggan
30 November 2017
Persimura Musi Rawas	1–0	PS Keluarga USU

== National round ==
There are 24 teams (+8 teams from Play-off round) entered this round and played on 3–17 December 2017 at Central Java.

=== Group stage ===
==== Group A ====
All matches were held in Citarum Stadium, Semarang.

Pos	Team	Pld	W	D	L	GF	GA	GD	Pts	Qualification
1	Kuala Nanggroe	3	2	1	0	3	0	+3	7	Advance to Knockout phase
2	PSDS Deli Serdang	3	1	2	0	2	1	+1	5	Advance to Knockout phase
3	PS Matra North Mamuju	3	0	2	1	1	2	−1	2	
4	Persewar Waropen	3	0	1	2	0	3	−3	1	

Source: PSSI

3 December 2017
PSDS Deli Serdang	0–0	Kuala Nanggroe
Persewar Waropen	0–0	PS Matra North Mamuju
5 December 2017
Kuala Nanggroe	2–0	Persewar Waropen
PS Matra North Mamuju	1–1	PSDS Deli Serdang
7 December 2017
Persewar Waropen	0–1	PSDS Deli Serdang
PS Matra North Mamuju	0–1	Kuala Nanggroe

==== Group B ====
All matches were held in Citarum Stadium, Semarang.

Pos	Team	Pld	W	D	L	GF	GA	GD	Pts	Qualification
1	Aceh United	3	2	1	0	7	2	+5	7	Advance to Knockout phase
2	Persibo Bojonegoro	3	2	1	0	5	2	+3	7	Advance to Knockout phase
3	PSKC Cimahi	3	1	0	2	2	3	−1	3	
4	Peseban Banjarmasin	3	0	0	3	0	7	−7	0	

Source: PSSI

4 December 2017
PSKC Cimahi	2–0	Peseban Banjarmasin
Persibo Bojonegoro	2–2	Aceh United
6 December 2017
Peseban Banjarmasin	0–2	Persibo Bojonegoro
Aceh United	2–0	PSKC Cimahi
8 December 2017
Persibo Bojonegoro	1–0	PSKC Cimahi
Aceh United	3–0	Peseban Banjarmasin

==== Group C ====
All matches were held in Kebon Dalem Stadium, Kendal.

Pos	Team	Pld	W	D	L	GF	GA	GD	Pts	Qualification
1	Maung Anom	3	3	0	0	9	2	+7	9	Advance to Knockout phase
2	Persik Kendal	3	2	0	1	7	1	+6	6	Advance to Knockout phase
3	PES Pessel South Coast	3	1	0	2	3	11	−8	3	
4	Villa 2000 021 Jakarta	3	0	0	3	2	7	−5	0	

Source: PSSI

3 December 2017
Maung Anom	1–0	Persik Kendal
Villa 2000 021 Jakarta	1–2	PES Pessel South Coast
5 December 2017
Persik Kendal	3–0	Villa 2000 021 Jakarta
PES Pessel South Coast	1–6	Maung Anom
7 December 2017
Villa 2000 021 Jakarta	1–2	Maung Anom
PES Pessel South Coast	0–4	Persik Kendal

==== Group D ====
All matches were held in Kebon Dalem Stadium, Kendal.

Pos	Team	Pld	W	D	L	GF	GA	GD	Pts	Qualification
1	Deltras Sidoarjo	3	2	0	1	8	1	+7	6	Advance to Knockout phase
2	Persitangsel South Tangerang	3	2	0	1	4	3	+1	6	Advance to Knockout phase
3	Persbit Bitung	3	2	0	1	4	6	−2	6	
4	Batang Anai	3	0	0	3	2	8	−6	0	

Source: PSSI

4 December 2017
Deltras Sidoarjo	4–0	Batang Anai
Persbit Bitung	2–1	Persitangsel South Tangerang
6 December 2017
Batang Anai	1–2	Persbit Bitung
Persitangsel South Tangerang	1–0	Deltras Sidoarjo
8 December 2017
Persbit Bitung	0–4	Deltras Sidoarjo
Persitangsel South Tangerang	2–1	Batang Anai

==== Group E ====
All matches were held in Wergu Wetan Stadium, Kudus.

Pos	Team	Pld	W	D	L	GF	GA	GD	Pts	Qualification
1	Perse Ende	3	2	1	0	9	5	+4	7	Advance to Knockout phase
2	PSAD Kodam VI/MLW Balikpapan	3	2	0	1	5	4	+1	6	Advance to Knockout phase
3	PS Bank Sulut	3	1	1	1	7	6	+1	4	
4	Persiter Ternate	3	0	0	3	3	9	−6	0	

Source: PSSI

3 December 2017
PS Bank Sulut	1–2	PSAD Kodam VI/MLW Balikpapan
Perse Ende	4–1	Persiter Ternate
5 December 2017
PSAD Kodam VI/MLW Balikpapan	1–2	Perse Ende
Persiter Ternate	1–3	PS Bank Sulut
7 December 2017
Perse Ende	3–3	PS Bank Sulut
Persiter Ternate	1–2	PSAD Kodam VI/MLW Balikpapan

==== Group F ====
All matches were held in Wergu Wetan Stadium, Kudus.

Pos	Team	Pld	W	D	L	GF	GA	GD	Pts	Qualification
1	PS Bintan	3	2	1	0	4	2	+2	7	Advance to Knockout phase
2	Persilat Central Lampung	3	2	0	1	4	2	+2	6	Advance to Knockout phase
3	Nabil	3	1	0	2	5	5	0	3	
4	Satria Adikarta	3	0	1	2	1	5	−4	1	

Source: PSSI

4 December 2017
Nabil	1–3	Persilat Central Lampung
Satria Adikarta	1–1	PS Bintan
6 December 2017
Persilat Central Lampung	1–0	Satria Adikarta
PS Bintan	2–1	Nabil
8 December 2017
Satria Adikarta	0–3	Nabil
PS Bintan	1–0	Persilat Central Lampung

==== Group G ====
All matches were held in Gelora Bumi Kartini Stadium, Jepara.

Pos	Team	Pld	W	D	L	GF	GA	GD	Pts	Qualification
1	Persekabpas Pasuruan	2	1	1	0	3	1	+2	4	Advance to Knockout phase
2	Sidrap United	2	0	2	0	3	3	0	2	Advance to Knockout phase
3	Persijam Jambi	2	0	1	1	2	4	−2	1	
4	Pelangi Intimung	0	0	0	0	0	0	0	0	Disqualified

Source: PSSI

3 December 2017
Persekabpas Pasuruan	2–0	Persijam Jambi
5 December 2017
Persijam Jambi	2–2	Sidrap United
7 December 2017
Persekabpas Pasuruan	1–1	Sidrap United

==== Group H ====
All matches were held in Gelora Bumi Kartini Stadium, Jepara.

Pos	Team	Pld	W	D	L	GF	GA	GD	Pts	Qualification
1	Persimura Musi Rawas	3	2	1	0	5	1	+4	7	Advance to Knockout phase
2	Blitar United	3	1	2	0	8	1	+7	5	Advance to Knockout phase
3	Persis GR	3	1	1	1	4	2	+2	4	
4	PS Bangka Selection	3	0	0	3	1	14	−13	0	

Source: PSSI

4 December 2017
Persis GR	3–0 (W.O.)	PS Bangka Selection
Blitar United	0–0	Persimura Musi Rawas
6 December 2017
PS Bangka Selection	0–7	Blitar United
Persimura Musi Rawas	1–0	Persis GR
8 December 2017
Blitar United	1–1	Persis GR
Persimura Musi Rawas	4–1	PS Bangka Selection

=== Knockout phase ===
Round of 16
11 December 2017 – Semarang
Kuala Nanggroe	1
Persibo	2
11 December 2017 – Semarang
Aceh United	3
PSDS	2
10 December 2017 – Kendal
Maung Anom	1
Persitangsel	2
11 December 2017 – Kendal
Deltras	1
Persik Kendal	3
10 December 2017 – Kudus
Perse	2
Persilat	0
11 December 2017 – Kudus
PS Bintan	0
PSAD Balikpapan	2
10 December 2017 – Jepara
Persekabpas	0
Blitar United	1
11 December 2017 – Jepara
Persimura (a.e.t.)	2
Sidrap United	1

Quarter-finals
13 December 2017 – Semarang
Persibo	1
Aceh United	2
13 December 2017 – Kendal
Persitangsel	0
Persik Kendal	2
13 December 2017 – Kudus
Perse	0
PSAD Balikpapan	1
13 December 2017 – Jepara
Blitar United	3
Persimura	1

Semi-finals
15 December 2017 – Kendal
Aceh United	1
Persik Kendal	2
15 December 2017 – Jepara
PSAD Balikpapan	0
Blitar United	1

Final
17 December 2017 – Jepara
Persik Kendal	1
Blitar United	2
Third place
17 December 2017 – Jepara
Aceh United	2
PSAD Balikpapan	0

==== Round of 16 ====
10 December 2017
Maung Anom	1–2	Persitangsel South Tangerang	Kebon Dalem Stadium, Kendal
Perse Ende	2–0	Persilat Central Lampung	Wergu Wetan Stadium, Kudus
Persekabpas Pasuruan	0–1	Blitar United	Gelora Bumi Kartini Stadium, Jepara
11 December 2017
Kuala Nanggroe	1–2	Persibo Bojonegoro	Citarum Stadium, Semarang
Aceh United	3–2	PSDS Deli Serdang	Citarum Stadium, Semarang
Deltras Sidoarjo	1–3	Persik Kendal	Kebon Dalem Stadium, Kendal
PS Bintan	0–2	PSAD Kodam VI/MLW Balikpapan	Wergu Wetan Stadium, Kudus
Persimura Musi Rawas	2–1 (a.e.t.)	Sidrap United	Gelora Bumi Kartini Stadium, Jepara

==== Quarter-finals ====
13 December 2017
Persibo Bojonegoro	1–2	Aceh United	Citarum Stadium, Semarang
Persitangsel South Tangerang	0–2	Persik Kendal	Kebon Dalem Stadium, Kendal
Perse Ende	0–1	PSAD Kodam VI/MLW Balikpapan	Wergu Wetan Stadium, Kudus
Blitar United	3–1	Persimura Musi Rawas	Gelora Bumi Kartini Stadium, Jepara

==== Semi-finals ====
15 December 2017
Aceh United	1–2	Persik Kendal	Kebon Dalem Stadium, Kendal
PSAD Kodam VI/MLW Balikpapan	0–1	Blitar United	Gelora Bumi Kartini Stadium, Jepara

==== Third-place ====
17 December 2017
Aceh United	2–0	PSAD Kodam VI/MLW Balikpapan	Gelora Bumi Kartini Stadium, Jepara

==== Final ====
17 December 2017
Persik Kendal	1–2	Blitar United	Gelora Bumi Kartini Stadium, Jepara

== Champions ==
Champions
Blitar United
1st title

== Awards ==
- Best Player: Assanur Rijal (Aceh United)
- Top Scorer: Arianto (Aceh United)

== See also ==
- 2017 Liga 1
- 2017 Liga 2
