= Mitali =

Mitali is a given name. Notable people bearing this given include;

- Mitali Bag, Indian politician
- Mitali Nag, Indian television actress
- Mitali Mayekar, Indian Marathi television and film actress
- Mitali Mukherjee (journalist), Indian news anchor and financial journalist
- Mitali Mukherjee (singer), Indian-Bangladeshi classical and playback singer
- Mitali Roy, Indian politician
- Mitali Madhumita, second woman officer in the Indian Army
- Mitali Mukerji, Professor and Head of the Department of Bioscience
- Mitali Perkins, Indian-American writer of children's and young adult literature
- Mitali Banerjee Ruths, American-Canadian children's author and pediatrician
- Mitali Banerjee Bhawmik, Indian classical singer

== See also ==
- Mitali Express
- Mithali Raj
- Matali (disambiguation)
