= 2017 Liga 3 Lampung =

Liga 3 Lampung
- Season: 2017
- Champions: Persilat

The 2017 Liga 3 Lampung season is the third edition of Liga 3 Lampung is a qualifying round of the 2017 Liga 3. Persilat are the defending champions.

== Teams ==
19 clubs from entire Lampung will be join this league.

- Group A :

Persilamtim, Putrad PB, Ababil United, Persilu, Lampung.

- Group B :

Infa 39 MM, Karya Wiyata, La Plata YONIF 143/TWEJ F.C., SS Lampung

- Group C :

Mesuji, Serasi, PS Tanggamus, Spectra F.C., Persilat.

- Group D :

PSBL, Bintang Utama Utara, Bandar Lampung, Kampus City, Projaya South Lampung.

== Champions ==
Champions
Persilat
2nd title
