= Matali =

Matali may refer to one of the following:

- Kal Matali, a village in Iran
- Mātali (Sanskrit: मातलि), charioteer of Indra in Hinduism.
- PS Bintang Muda Matali, an Indonesian football club in 2017 Liga 3 North Sulawesi
- Hadi Ariffin Bin Matali Abdul, a Sepaktakraw player for Brunei at the 2014 Asian Games
- Kitab Matali' al-Buruj, a work of Islamic mathematical astronomy translated into Chinese by Ma Yize
- Andreu Matalí, a basketball player for BC Andorra

== See also ==
- Mətəli river, a tributary of the Vilesh
- Mary Matalin, an American political consultant
- Matalia, a synonym for the snout moth genus Stericta
- Matale District a district in Central Province, Sri Lanka.
- Matal v. Tam, a United States Supreme Court case
