= Fahreza =

Fahreza is a given name. Notable people with the name include:

- Fahreza Agamal (born 1992), Indonesian footballer
- Fahreza Sudin (born 2000), Indonesian footballer

== See also ==
- Bahril Fahreza (born 2001), Indonesian footballer
