= 2017 Liga 3 North Maluku =

Liga 3 North Maluku
- Season: 2017
- Champions: Persiter Ternate

The 2017 Liga 3 North Maluku is the third edition of Liga 3 North Maluku as a qualifying round for the national round of 2017 Liga 3. Persiter Ternate are the defending champions.

== Teams ==
Only 3 clubs participated in the league in this season.

#	Clubs
1	Persiter Ternate
2	Persihalbar West Halmahera
3	Persitob Tobelo

== Group stage ==
This stage scheduled starts on 9 July 2017 and finish 27 July 2017. The winner of group stage will represent North Maluku region in national round of 2017 Liga 3.

All matches will be held in Gelora Kie Raha Stadium, Ternate.

Pos	Team	Pld	W	D	L	GF	GA	GD	Pts	Qualification
1	Persiter Ternate (F)	2	1	1	0	3	1	+2	4	Advance to final
2	Persihalbar West Halmahera (F)	2	1	1	0	3	2	+1	4	Advance to final
3	Persitob Tobelo	2	0	0	2	1	4	−3	0	

Updated to match(es) played on 27 July 2017. Source: Info Liga 3
(F) ?
21 July 2017
16:00 WIT

Persiter Ternate	1–1	Persihalbar West Halmahera
	Report

Gelora Kie Raha Stadium, Ternate
23 July 2017
16:00 WIT

Persiter Ternate	2–0	Persitob Tobelo
Ajis Yamin 35'; Sofyan Hairuddin 58'	Report

Gelora Kie Raha Stadium, Ternate
Referee: Fransiscus
25 July 2017
16:00 WIT

Persitob Tobelo	1–2	Persihalbar West Halmahera

Gelora Kie Raha Stadium, Ternate

== Final ==
Because of the points and head-to-head between Persiter Ternate and Persihalbar West Halmahera is similar, so the final stage is held.

27 July 2017
16:00 WIT

Persiter Ternate	1–0	Persihalbar West Halmahera
Sofyan 66'	Report

Gelora Kie Raha Stadium, Ternate
Referee: Husen Ali

== Champions ==
Champions
Persiter Ternate
2nd title
