= 2017 Liga 3 West Sumatra =

Liga 3 West Sumatra
- Season: 2017

The 2017 Liga 3 West Sumatra is the third edition of Liga 3 West Sumatra as a qualifying round for the 2017 Liga 3.

The competition scheduled starts on July 15, 2017.

== Teams ==
There are 14 clubs which will participate the league in this season.

Group A
PSKB Bukittinggi
PS GAS Sawahlunto
PSKPS Pasaman
Persikopa Pariaman
PS Batang Anai (Padang Pariaman)

Group B
PS Aroma Taram
PSBS Batusangkar
Persiju Sijunjung
PS Pasbar (West Pasaman)
PS Pessel (South Pesisir)

Group C
Gasliko Lima Puluh Kota
Seven FC Ulakan (Padang Pariaman)
PSP Padang
Limkos FC Padang Pariaman
