= 2017 Liga 3 Jambi =

Liga 3 Jambi
- Season: 2017

The 2017 Liga 3 Jambi is the third edition of Liga 3 Jambi as a qualifying round for the 2017 Liga 3.

The competition starts on 3 August 2017.

== Teams ==
There are 8 clubs which will participate the league in this season.

2017 clubs
Group A
PS Tebo
Persikoja Jambi
PS PLN Jambi
Persibri Batanghari
Group B
Persijam Jambi
PS Sailun Salimbai (Muaro Jambi)
PS POP
PS Siginjai Sakti
