= 2017 Liga 3 Riau =

Liga 3 Riau
- Season: 2017

The 2017 Liga 3 Riau is the third edition of Liga 3 Riau as a qualifying round for the national round of 2017 Liga 3. Riau F.C. are the defending champions.

The competition scheduled starts on 17 August 2017.

== Teams ==
There are 16 clubs which will participate the league in this season.

Participants
Tiga Naga FC
Nabil FC
PS Petalangan
Pandawalima FC
UIR Riau FC
Indragiri FC
PS Universitas Pahlawan T Tambusai Kampar
PS Siak
PS Bina Bakat
AS Abadi FC
Putra Khatulistiwa FC
Persikalis Bengkalis
Kabun Rohul FC
PS PPLP
Rumbai FC
Persiks Kuansing
