= 2017 Liga 3 West Sulawesi =

Liga 3 West Sulawesi
- Season: 2017

The 2017 Liga 3 West Sulawesi season is the third edition of Liga 3 West Sulawesi is a qualifying round of the 2017 Liga 3. Mamuju Utama FC are the defending champions.

== Teams ==
This season there are 7 clubs in West Sulawesi become participants. They are:

1. Persimaju Mamuju
2. PS Sandeq Polman
3. Balanipa Mandar FC
4. TSL AKO FC
5. Gasman Majene
6. PS Matra
7. OTP37 FC
