= 2017 Liga 3 Banten =

Liga 3 Banten
- Season: 2017

The 2017 Liga 3 Banten is the third edition of Liga 3 Banten as a qualifying round for the national round of 2017 Liga 3.

The competition was scheduled to start on July 21, 2017.

All match were played at Maulana Yusuf Stadium.

== Teams ==
There are 6 clubs which participated in the league in this season.

2017 clubs
Serang Jaya
Persikota Tangerang
Kanekes FC
Persitangsel South Tangerang
Bantara SC
Persic Cilegon
