= Theloderma licin =

Conservation status
- Least Concern (IUCN 3.1)

Scientific classification
- Kingdom: Animalia
- Phylum: Chordata
- Class: Amphibia
- Order: Anura
- Family: Rhacophoridae
- Genus: Theloderma
- Species: T. licin

Binomial name
- Theloderma licin (McLeod and Norhayati, 2007)

Species of amphibian

Theloderma licin, also known as the smooth frog and the white-backed bug-eyed frog, is a species of frog in the family Rhacophoridae found in peninsular Malaysia, southern Thailand, and Indonesia's Sumatra island. It inhabits lowland to montane forests. It can be found in water filled tree holes, bamboo cuts, or man-made objects like metal pipes.

== Appearance ==
The adult male frog measures about 28.0 – 30.1 mm in snout-vent length and the adult female 27.5 – 31.2 mm long. The skin of the dorsum is white-brown with darker spots and marks. The chin is brown. The iris is red in color.

== Etymology ==
Scientists named this frog licin from the Malay language word for "smooth." This is because the frog has smooth skin.

== Young ==
Scientists infer that this frog breeds in water-filled tree holes like its congeners.

== Habitat and range ==
Theloderma licin has been recorded from the following locations mostly in Malaysia, and also in Thailand and Indonesia. It has been observed between 82 and 193 meters above sea level.

- Taman Negara Resort, Kuala Tahan, Taman Negara National Park, Pahang State
- Lakum Forest Reserve, Pahang State
- Bukit Rengit and Kuala Gandah, Pahang State
- Pulau Perhentian, Pahang State
- Ulu Muda Forest Reserve, Kedah State
- Sungai Lasor base camp, Ulu Muda Forest Reserve, Kedah State
- Ampang Forest Reserve and Raja Muda Forest Reserve, Selangor State
- Kenaboi Forest Reserve, Negeri Sembilan State
- Khao Lu-ang National Park, Nakhon Si Thamarat Province, Thailand
- Isau-Isau Wildlife Reserve, South Sumatra, Indonesia
- Lembah Harau Nature Reserve, West Sumatra, Indonesia
- Muara Labuh, Kerinci Seblat National Park, West Sumatra, Indonesia
- Hutan Harapan, Jambi, Indonesia

== Threats ==
The IUCN classifies this frog as at least concern of extinction because of its large range and tolerance to habitat disruption.

== See also ==
- Napal Licin
