= Purwodadi, Musi Rawas =

Purwodadi
- District
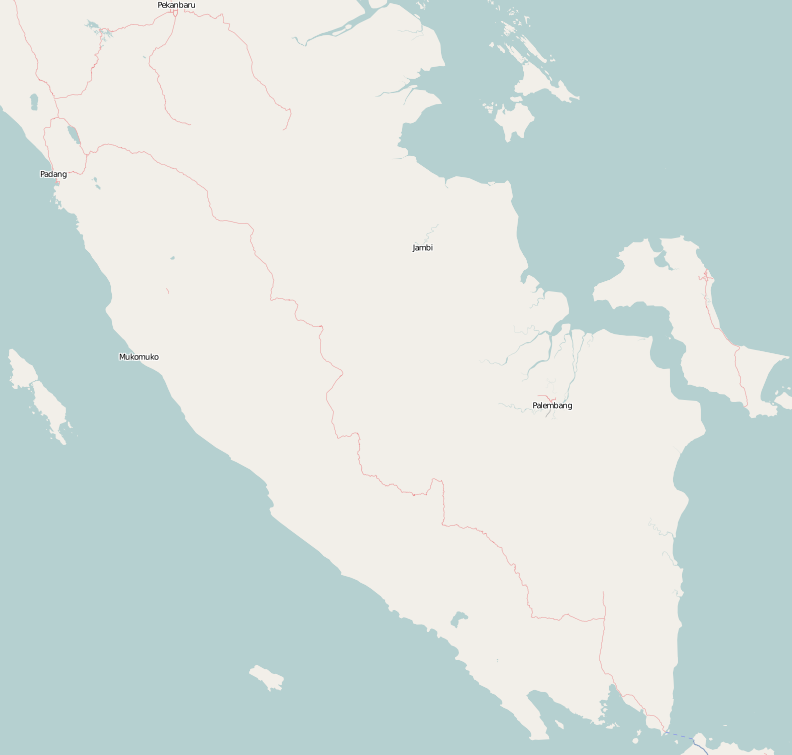
- Location within Southern Sumatra Location within Indonesia
- Coordinates: 3.0999778°S 102.97553529999999°E
- Country: Indonesia
- Province: South Sumatra
- Regency: Musi Rawas Regency

Government
  - Head of district: Adi Winata

Area
  - Total: 63.26 km^{2} (24.42 sq mi)

Population (mid 2024 estimate)
  - Total: 16,652
  - Density: 263.2/km^{2} (681.8/sq mi)
- Time zone: UTC+7 (IWST)
- Area code: (+62) 733
- Villages: 11
- Website: purwodadi.musi-rawas.go.id

Purwodadi is a district in Musi Rawas Regency, South Sumatra, Indonesia.

== Administrative villages ==
Karanganyar consists of 11 villages (kelurahan or desa) namely:

1. Bangun Sari
2. Karyadadi
3. Kerto Sari
4. Mangun Harjo
5. Mardi Harjo
6. Pagersari
7. Purwakarya
8. Purwodadi
9. Rejo Sari
10. Sadar Karya
11. Tri Karya
