= Napal Licin =

Coordinates: 2.7940°S 102.2450°E

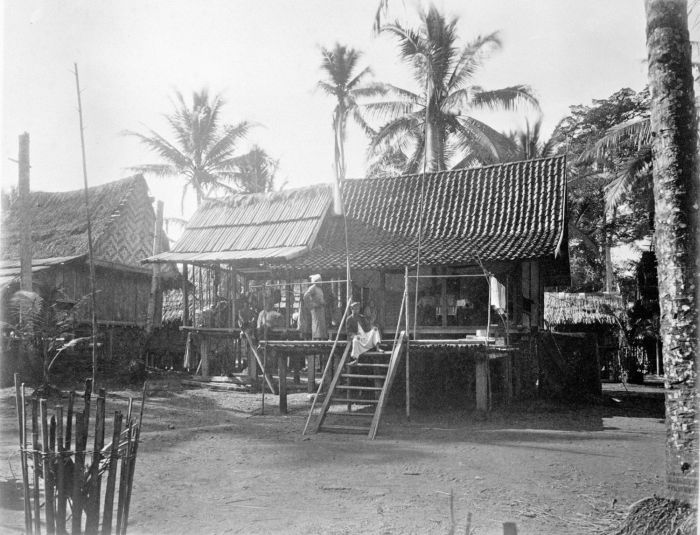
House in Napal Litjin, Rawas District, Sumatra (circa 1878)

Napal Licin, sometimes written as Napal Litjin from the Dutch East Indies era, is a location in south Sumatra that was visited by European explorers at the end of the 19th century. A cave in the area, Napal Licin Cave, features stalactites and stalagmites and is a tourist attraction that can be reached by boat up the Rawas River, a tributary of the Musi River.

Henry Ogg Forbes reached Napal Licin during his expedition to central Sumatra. He described it as a picturesque village at the base of a perpendicular limestone peak, Karang-nata (Karang Nato). He climbed it, describing the caves with stalactites and thousands of bats he encountered, as well as ferns, orchids, and a species of Boea. He also found a species of nutmeg with fruit "as large as the largest orange". He also found ants "milking" a Hemipteron which produced droplets for them.

== Gallery ==
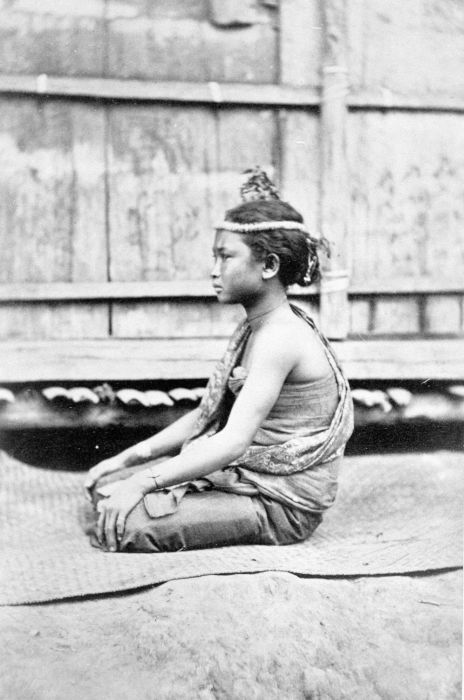
Portrait of girl in Napal Litjin, Djambi Residency (Jambi) by Daniël David Veth (circa 1878)

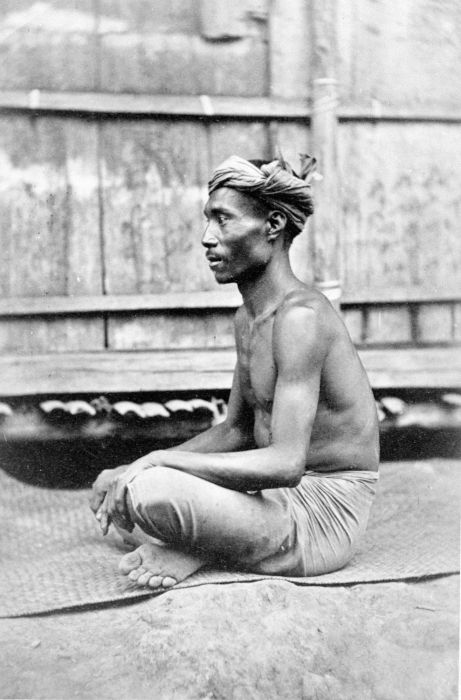
A native of Napal Litjin Palembang Uplands district Rawas Sumatra

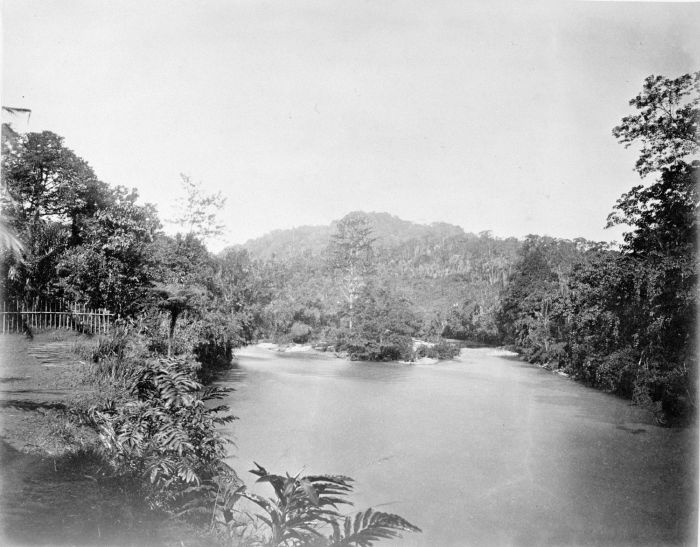
"Batang Koeloes" at Napal Litjin district, Rawas, Sumatra

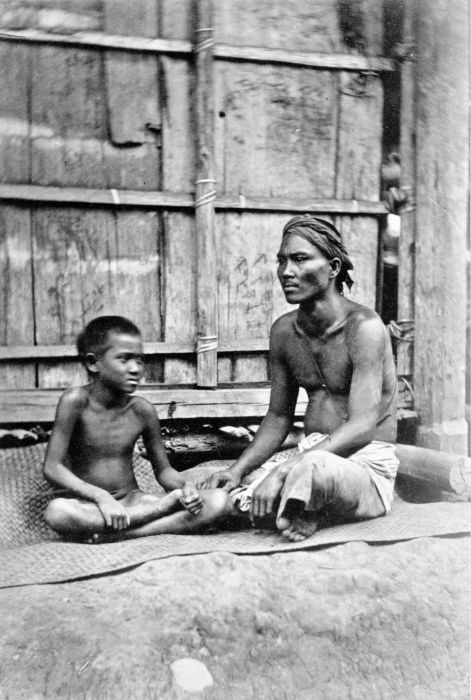
Man and boy in Napal Litjin

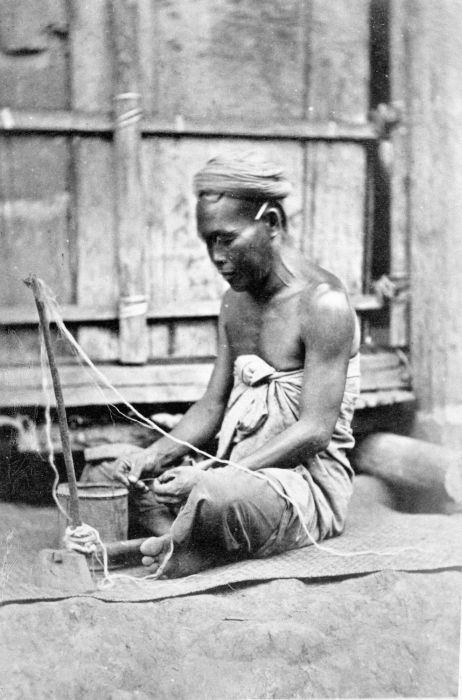
A rope spinner

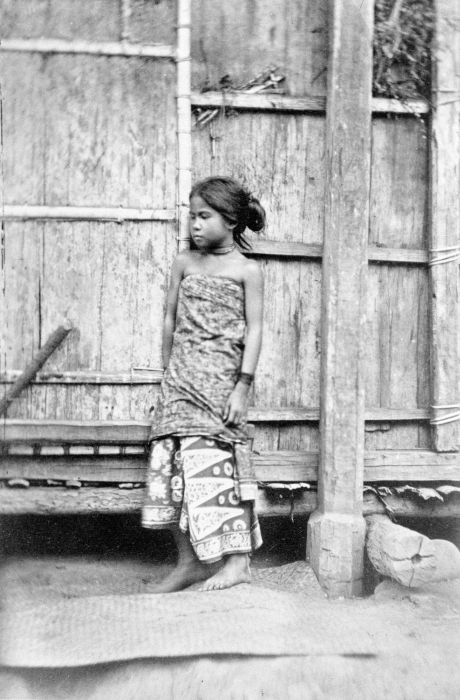
A girl

== See also ==
- Theloderma licin, a species of frog
- Musi Rawas
- Kerinci Seblat National Park
