= Muara Beliti =

Coordinates: 3°15′S 103°02′E

Muara Beliti is the capital of Musi Rawas, South Sumatra, Indonesia. Muara means estuary.

== Subdistricts and villages ==
- Air Lesing
- Air Satan
- Bumi Agung
- Durian Remuk
- Ketuan Jaya
- Mana Resmi
- Muara Beliti Baru
- Pasar Muara Beliti
- Pedang (Sumatra)
- Satan Indah Jaya
- Suro (Sumatra)
- Tanah Periuk
