= 2017 Liga 3 North Sulawesi =

Liga 3 North Sulawesi
- Season: 2017

The 2017 Liga 3 North Sulawesi season is the third edition of Liga Nusantara North Sulawesi is a qualifying round of the 2017 Liga 3. Persma 1960 Manado were the defending champions, but lost.

== Teams ==
This league is followed by 21 clubs.

- Group A
  - Persma 1960
  - PS Manado
  - Mandiri
  - PS Bank Sulut
  - Bina Taruna
  - Persital Talaud
  - PS Manguni Manado
- Group B
  - Persis Sangihe
  - Persitaro Sitaro
  - PSMU North Minahasa
  - Persbit Bitung
  - Persmin Minahasa
  - PSKT Tomohon
  - Persmitra Southeast Minahasa
- Group C
  - Persikokot Kotamobagu
  - Persibom Bolaang Mongondow
  - Bolsel (South Bolaang Mongondow)
  - Boltim (East Bolaang Mongondow)
  - PS Bintang Muda Matali
  - PS Kuda Laut Belang
  - Persminsel South Minahasa
