= 2017 Liga 3 Riau Islands =

Liga 3 Islands
- Season: 2017

The 2017 Liga 3 Riau Islands is the third edition of Liga 3 Riau Islands, as a qualifying round for the 2017 Liga 3.

The competition starts on 26 August 2017.

== Teams ==
There are six clubs which will participate the league in this season. Matches were played at Tumenggung Abdul Jamal Stadium, Batam.

2017 clubs
Group A
Persedas Dabo Singkep
PS Bintan
PS Karimun
Group B
FC Kepri United
PSTS Tanjungpinang
PS Natuna
