= Isau-Isau Wildlife Reserve =

Wildlife reserve in Indonesia

Isau Isau Wildlife Reserve
- Isau Isau Pasemah Wildlife Reserve
- IUCN category IV (habitat/species management area)
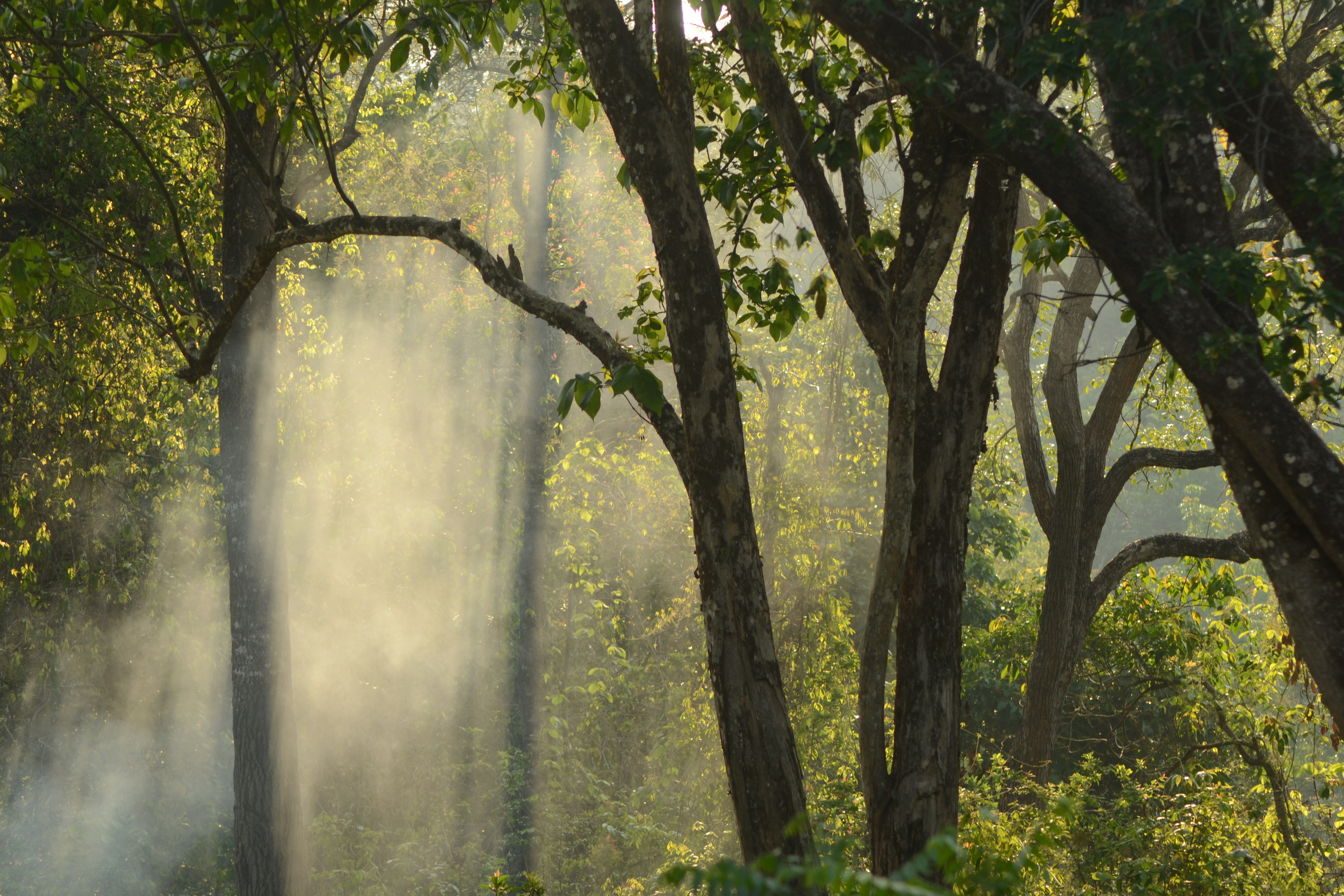
- Morning sunlight in Isau-Isau Wildlife Reserve
- Interactive map of Isau Isau Wildlife Reserve
- Location: South Sumatra, Indonesia
- Coordinates: 03°48′04″S 103°21′31″E
- Area: 16,742.92 ha (41,373 acres)
- Max. elevation: 1,400 m (4,593 ft)
- Min. elevation: 300 m (984 ft)
- Established: 1978
- Governing body: Natural Resources Conservation Agency (BKSDA)
- Website: https://balaiksdasumsel.org/halaman/detail/isau-isau

Isau-Isau Wildlife Reserve is a nature reserve in South Sumatra, Indonesia. It is home to a large number of species, many of which are threatened or endangered. Formerly protected as Isau-Isau Pasemah Nature Reserve since 1978, the modern Wildlife Reserve was founded in 2014 and is managed by the Natural Resources Conservation Agency (BKSDA) of South Sumatra Province. The reserve is listed as IUCN Management Category IV.

== Geography ==
Isau-Isau is one of South Sumatra's largest nature reserves, at 16,742.92 ha (41,373 acres). It spans across the regions of Kabupaten Lahat and Kabupaten Muara Enim. The reserve is isolated from other protected areas due to human presence. There are 24 villages in and around the reserve, including Lawang Agung, Pagar Agung, and Tanah Abang. These villages engage in agricultural practices such as coffee and rubber plantations.

=== Climate ===
The reserve ranges between approximately 300 and 1,400 meters (980 and 4,590 ft) in elevation. Temperature and humidity vary based on elevation and forest canopy cover. In old-growth forest, air and water temperature is lowest while humidity and dissolved oxygen in water is highest; the opposite is true in open plantations and settlements, with intermediate conditions in secondary forest. From January to March 2022, air temperature ranged from 22.7 to 28.3 °C (72.9 to 82.9 °F), while humidity ranged from 72% to 87%. Soil pH ranged from 7.2 in the forest to 7.9 on plantations. From May to July 2023, water temperature ranged from 19.6 °C (67.3 °F) in primary forest, up to 22.1 °C (71.8 °F) in human settlements. Dissolved oxygen in water ranged from 7.7 mg/L in primary forest to 5.06 mg/L in towns. Water pH is neutral in all habitats.

=== Geology ===
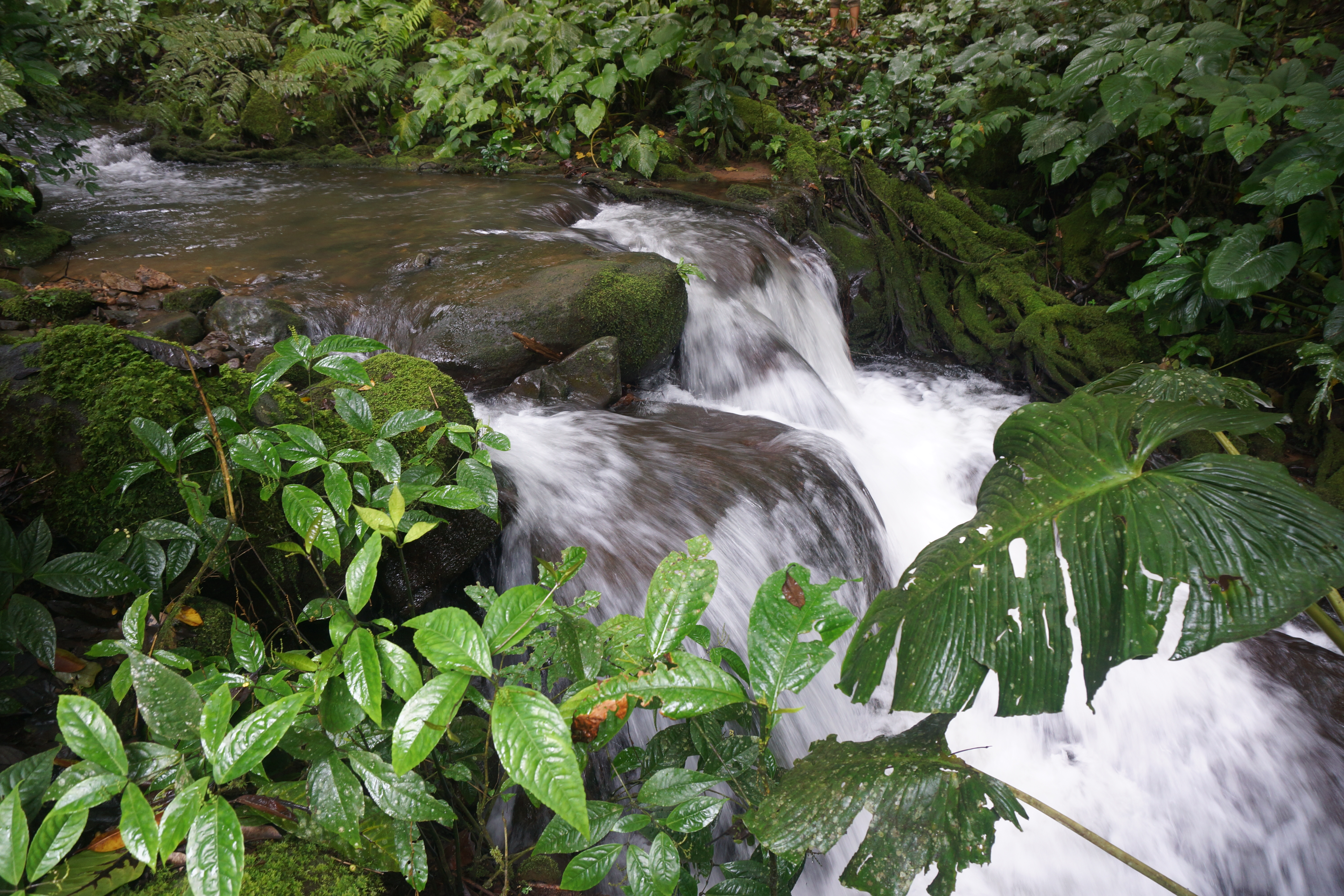
Waterfall in Isau-Isau

Isau-Isau Wildlife Reserve is on a volcanic landscape in the Bukit Barisan Mountains, and peaks on Isau-Isau Volcano at 1,422-1,431m (4,665.35-4,694.88 ft) in elevation. The mountain is a mostly andesitic volcano that last erupted during the Pleistocene Epoch. Isau-Isau's eruptions released andesitic lava flows and pyroclastic flows into the lowlands. The pyroclastic flows created tuff lapilli and tuff breksi rock formations.

=== Hydrology ===
The reserve is located in the Lematang and Perapau subwatersheds, within the Musi Watershed. The rainforest mitigates soil erosion and flooding. One river within the reserve is the 3-km long Ijuk River, which provides habitat for a diverse benthic insect community.

== Ecology ==
=== Flora ===
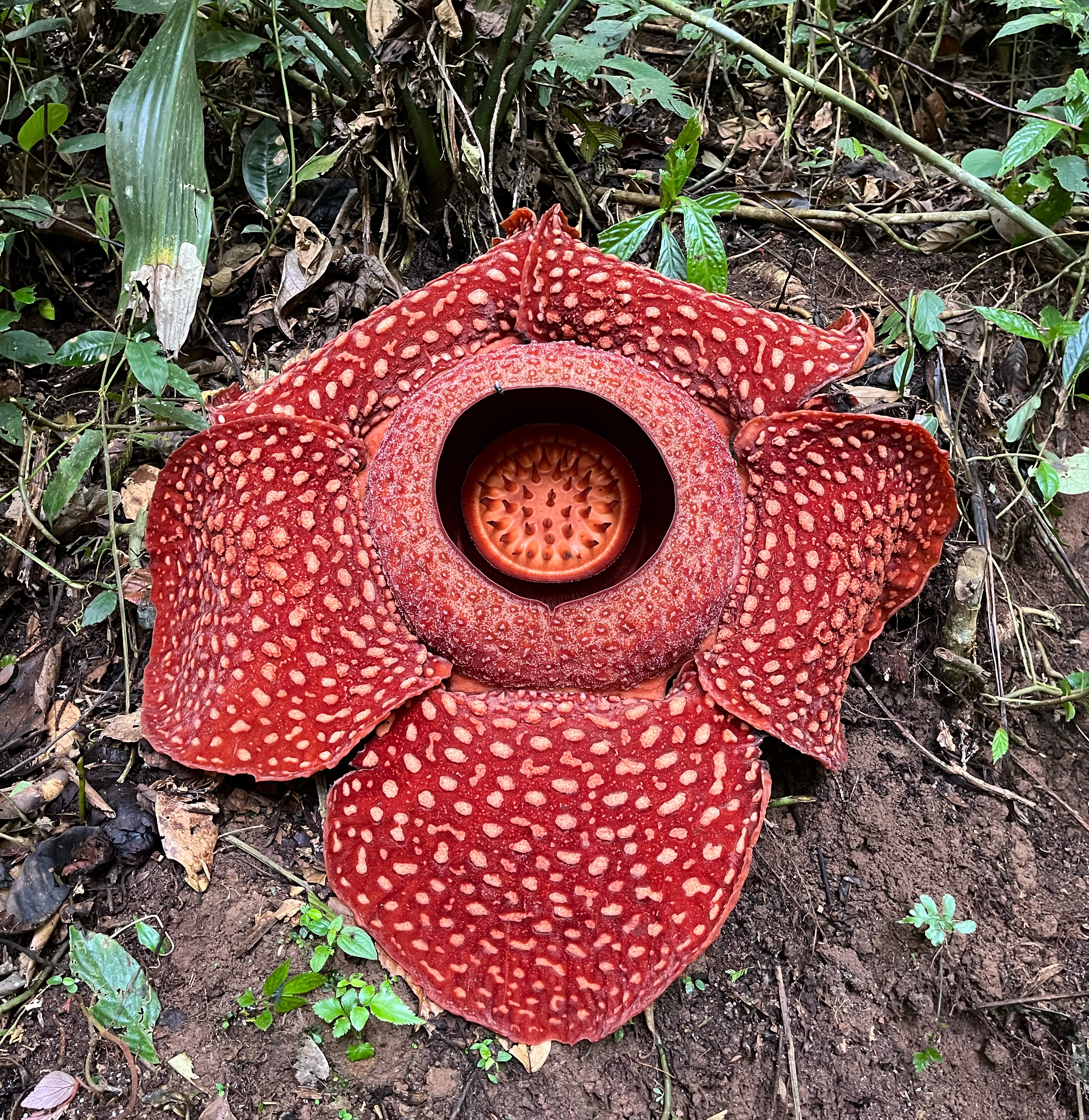
The corpse flower, Rafflesia

Sumatran lowland rainforest covers the majority of the reserve, with some Sumatran montane rainforest at higher elevations. The core of the reserve contains old-growth forest, while secondary forest grows around villages. The forest is dominated by hardwood trees of the Dipterocarpaceae family, such as meranti (Shorea sp.). Other common trees include Pulai (genus Alstonia), durian (genus Durio), jelutong (Dyera sp.), terap (Artocarpus elasticus), white mango (Mangifera caesia), and cempedak (Artocarpus integer). Understory species include vines such as rotan (Calamus manan), shrubs such as simpur (Dillenia grandifolia) and albizia (genus Paraserianthes), and grasses like bamboo (Bambusa sp.).

The forest is home to the world's largest flower species, the corpse flower (Rafflesia arnoldii), and the world's tallest flower species, Amorphopallus muelleri.

At least 22 species of orchids live in Isau-Isau. 21 of these species are epiphytes (tree-dwellers) and one is terrestrial. One species in the reserve, Vanda foetida, is endemic to South Sumatra.

41 plant species in the reserve and surrounding villages are used for traditional medicine. Isau-Isau's plants of the pepper (Piperaceae) family have antibacterial properties.

=== Fauna ===
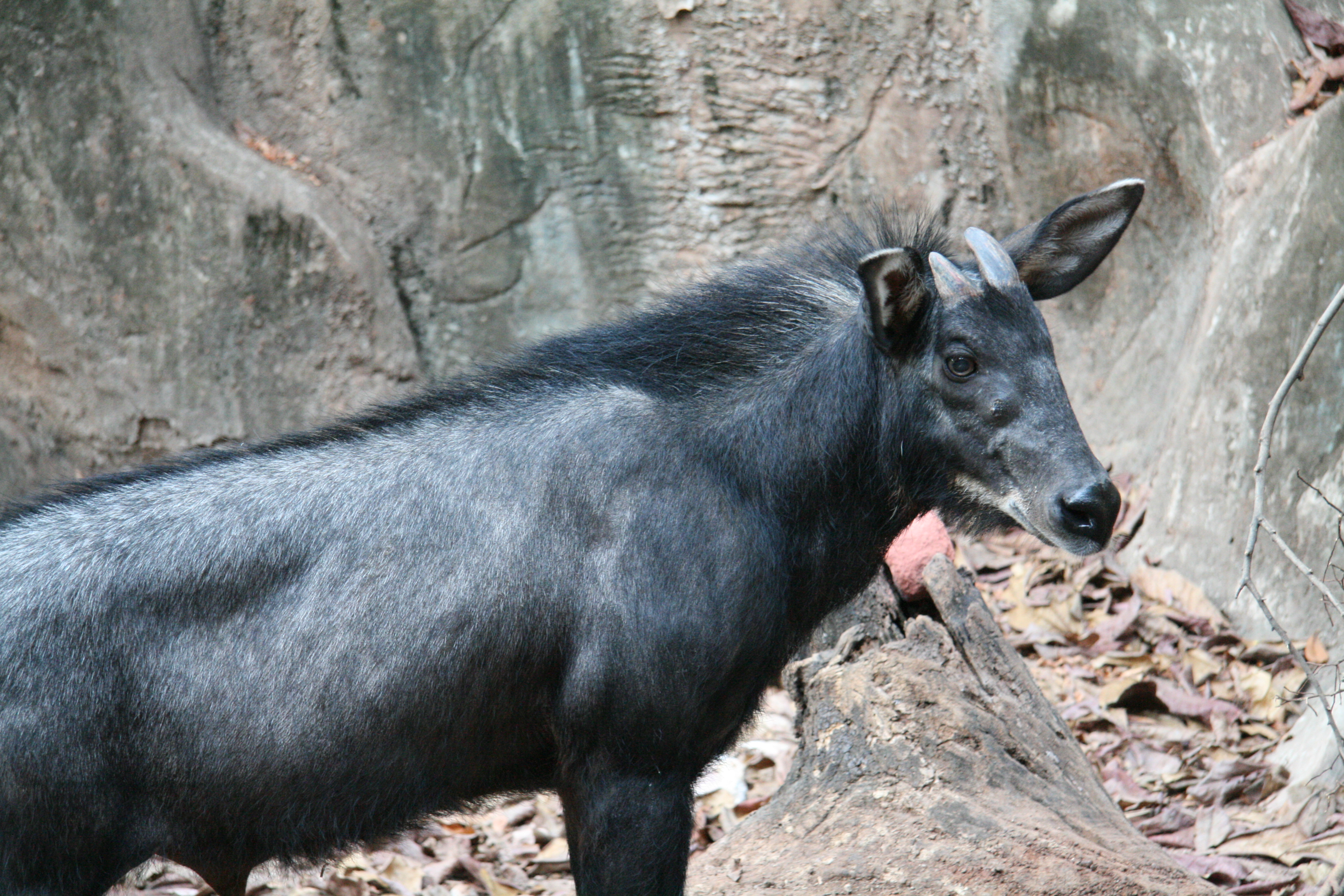
A vulnerable Sumatran serow

Isau-Isau's rainforest is home to many species of primates: siamang (Symphalangus cyndactylus), southern pig-tailed macaque (Macaca nemestrina), black-crested Sumatran langur (Presbytis melalophos), Sunda slow loris (Nycticebus coucang), and agile gibbon (Hylobates agilis). Herbivores such as Sumatran porcupine (Hystrix brachyuran), lesser mouse-deer (Tragulus kanchil), sambar deer (Cervus unicolor), southern red muntjac (Muntiacus muntjak), banded pig (Sus scrofa vittatus), Sumatran serow (Capricornis sumatraensis), and Malayan tapir (Tapirus indicus) browse the flora, while the critically endangered Sunda pangolin (Manis javanica) feeds on insects. The reserve is home to the world's rarest lagomorph, the Sumatran striped rabbit (Nesolagus netscheri).

Predatory mammals of the reserve include the binturong (Arctictis binturong), Asian golden cat (Catopuma teminckii), marbled cat (Pardofelis marmorata), Asian leopard cat (Felis bengalensis), dhole (Cuon alpinus), Sunda clouded leopard (Neofelis diardii), sun bear (Helarctos malayanus), and Sumatran Tiger (Panthera tigris sumatrae).

Bats in Isau-Isau include black-capped fruit bat (Chironax melanocephalus), lesser short-nosed fruit bat (Cynopterus brachyotis), and greater short-nosed fruit bat (Cynopterus sphinx).

At least 22 bird species have been documented in the reserve. These include the white chested babbler (Trichastoma rostratum), rhinoceros hornbill (Buceros rhinoceros) and bronze-tailed peacock-pheasant (Polyplectron chalcurum).

12 amphibian species have been observed in Isau-Isau, representing 11 genera and 4 families. Common species include the crab-eating frog (Fejervarya cancrivora) and Asian giant toad (Phrynoidis asper). The white-backed bug-eyed frog (Theloderma licin), an IUCN data deficient species, lives in shrubs and on the ground near water sources. Amphibian diversity is highest in secondary dryland forest and primary dryland forest.

Earlier habitat assessments from the 1990s determined that the reserve did not have the capacity to host large animals such as Sumatran elephants (Elephas maximus sumatranus), although there is a captive elephant sanctuary nearby in Lahat that, as of 2023, houses one male and seven female elephants.

=== Fungi ===
A 2022 study identified 30 species of fungi in Isau-Isau's forests. One species comes from the phylum Ascomycota, while the rest are in the phylum Basidiomycota. The most prevalent family was Polyporaceae, with 9 decomposer species.

== Human impact and conservation ==
=== Threats ===
The reserve is threatened by illegal logging and illegal agricultural plantations within the protected area. As the human population surrounding the reserve grows and the local environment shifts, there is increasing pressure on the landscape. From 1990 to 2000, the reserve lost approximately 1.9 km^{2} of forest cover, at a rate of 0.19% forest loss per year. Many species, such as the Sumatran serow, are poached by locals for food and trade. Tigers are also poached as a result of human-wildlife conflict, as tigers have killed people. Other species are captured alive for illegal wildlife trafficking. Wildlife living near agricultural habitat may be exposed to pesticides, which can be especially harmful to local amphibians. Until recently, conservation measures were poorly enforced by authorities due to low budgets following Indonesia's decolonization.

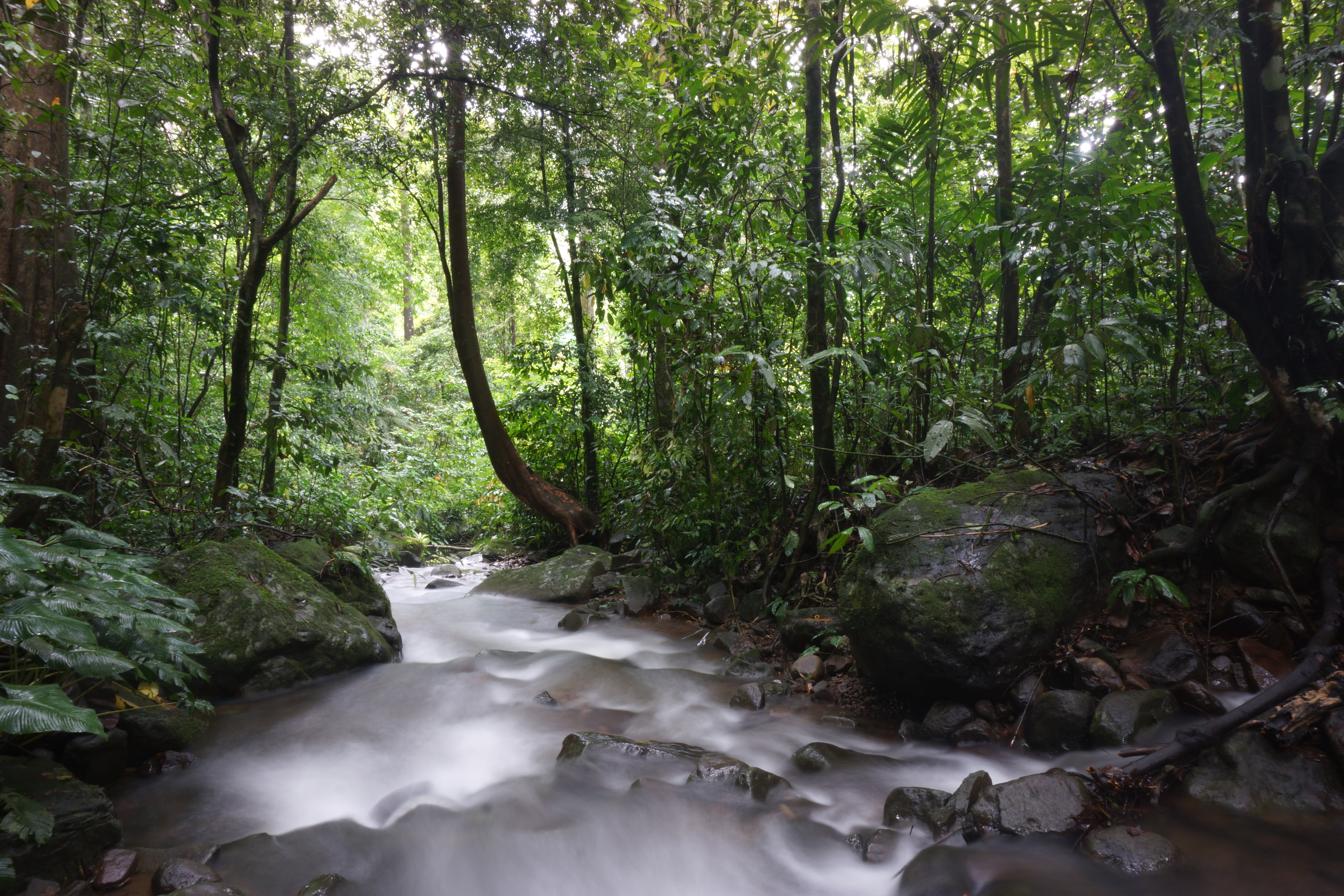
A river in Isau-Isau Wildlife Reserve

=== Conservation measures ===
In the 2010s and 2020s, the BKSDA and several non-governmental organizations (NGOs) have begun a series of efforts to protect and restore the ecology of Isau-Isau and other nature reserves in South Sumatra. In 2014, the government and NGOs published a framework for monitoring and protecting biodiversity in South Sumatra. The framework called for programs such as assessing biological diversity and habitat integrity, mapping hotspots of human-wildlife conflict, encouraging citizen science and stakeholder collaboration, and using research to facilitate habitat restoration and the establishment of ecological corridors to connect protected habitats. A follow-up action plan in 2017 called for increased law enforcement to mitigate illegal logging and poaching. This plan also called for flora and fauna reintroduction, ecotourism development, renewal of sustainable agroforestry using traditional knowledge, and normalizing biodiversity considerations into everyday life. Previous studies have indicated Isau-Isau as a priority location to assess for reforestation.

The action plans have begun to facilitate change. Programs such as the Jungle Library Book Project engage children from local villages in hands-on environmental education, where students use scientific exploration to interact with the rainforest. Students aged 8–10 years are taught in biweekly lessons for the entire school year. All students showed improved knowledge of ecological concepts and conservation awareness following their year in the program. The Sumatra Camera Trap Project has intensified scientific research by monitoring local wildlife such as tigers with remote cameras. The Flora Rescue Project recovers threatened plants from areas of the rainforest that are vulnerable to destruction. The plants are propagated in captivity, before eventually being released into better-protected habitat within the reserve. Local villagers have begun to engage in conservation by reporting cases of wildlife trafficking and poaching, and have assisted conservation officers with the process of rehabilitating and releasing trafficked animals to the wild. Many animals, such as gibbons, have been voluntarily surrendered recently. Organizations such as the Aspinall Foundation have assisted with wildlife rehabilitation and release. Ecotourism is encouraged by the BKSDA and partnering NGOs.
