= 2017 Liga 3 Maluku =

Liga 3 Maluku
- Season: 2017

The 2017 Liga 3 Maluku is the third edition of Liga 3 Maluku as a qualifying round for the 2017 Liga 3.

The competition scheduled starts on 22 July 2017.

== Teams ==
There are 7 clubs which will participate the league in this season.

2017 clubs
Maluku Putra FC
Bursel FC (South Buru)
PSA Ambon
Galunggung FC
Pelauw Putra
Ilehena FC
Hatunuku FC
