= 2017 Liga 3 Jakarta =

Liga 3 Jakarta
- Season: 2017

The 2017 Liga 3 Jakarta is the third edition of Liga 3 Jakarta as a qualifying round for the 2017 Liga 3.

The competition scheduled starts on July 15, 2017.

== Teams ==
There are 21 clubs which will participate the league in this season.

Group A
MC Utama
Bintang Kota FC
Putra Citra Muda
Bintang Kranggan
Persija Muda

Group B
PRO-Direct
Pemuda Jaya
PS Jakarta Selatan
Urakan FC
Trisakti FC

Group C
Batavia FC
Persitara North Jakarta
Villa 2000 FC
ABC Wirayuda
Betawi FC

Group D
Bina Mutiara FC
Jakarta Timur FC
Taruna Persada
Laskar Muda FC
PS Jakarta Barat
Kompak FC
