= 2017 Liga 3 Bengkulu =

Liga 3 Bengkulu
- Season: 2017

The 2017 Liga 3 Bengkulu is the third edition of Liga 3 Bengkulu as a qualifying round for the 2017 Liga 3.

The competition scheduled starts on 30 July 2017.

== Teams ==
There are 10 clubs which will participate the league in this season.

Group 1
PS Lebong
Persiman Manna (South Bengkulu)
PS Kepahiang
PS Bengkulu Raya
Persibutara North Bengkulu

Group 2
PS Seluma
PS Mukomuko
PS Benteng (Central Bengkulu)
PS Indonesia Muda
Bengkulu Putra FC
