= Bahril Fahreza =

Indonesian footballer

Personal information
- Full name: Mohammad Bahril Fajar Fahreza
- Date of birth: 16 February 2001 (age 25)
- Place of birth: Sampang, Indonesia
- Height: 1.83 m (6 ft 0 in)
- Positions: Forward; left-back

Youth career
- SSB Pusam
- SSB PSGM Banjarnegara
- Persesa Sampang
- PSIS U18

Senior career*
Years	Team	Apps	(Gls)
2021–2024	PSIS Semarang	8	(1)
2023–2024	→ Persik Kendal (loan)	0	(0)

International career
2020	Indonesia U19	5	(0)
- * Club domestic league appearances and goals as of 26 March 2023

Mohammad Bahril Fajar Fahreza (born 16 February 2001) is an Indonesian professional footballer who plays as a forward or left-back.

== Club career ==
=== PSIS Semarang ===
He was signed for PSIS Semarang to play in Liga 1 in the 2021 season. Bahril made his professional debut on 15 October 2021 in a match against Persik Kediri at the Manahan Stadium, Surakarta.

== International career ==
In August 2020, Bahril was included on Indonesia national under-19 football team 30-man list for Training Center in Croatia. He earned his first under-19 cap on 11 September 2020 in 3–3 draw against Saudi Arabia U19.

== Career statistics ==
=== Club ===
As of 26 March 2023

Club	Season	League			Cup		Other		Total	
Club	Season	Division	Apps	Goals	Apps	Goals	Apps	Goals	Apps	Goals
PSIS Semarang	2021–22	Liga 1	4	1	0	0	0	0	4	1
PSIS Semarang	2022–23	Liga 1	4	0	0	0	0	0	4	0
Persik Kendal (loan)	2023–24	Liga 3	0	0	0	0	0	0	0	0
Career total			8	1	0	0	0	0	8	1
