= Persihalbar West Halmahera =

Indonesian football club

Persihalbar
- Full name: Persatuan Sepakbola Indonesia Halmahera Barat
- Nickname: Laskar Banau
- Founded: 2005; 21 years ago
- Ground: Banau Stadium; Jailolo, West Halmahera
- Capacity: 1,500
- Chairman: Djufri Muhamad
- Coach: Lukas Ulahayanan
- League: Liga 4
- 2021: Withdraw, Liga 3
Home colours	Away colours

Persatuan Sepakbola Indonesia Halmahera Barat, commonly known as Persihalbar, is a football club based in Jailolo, West Halmahera, North Maluku. They are currently playing at Liga 4 and their homebase is Banau Stadium.

== Honours ==
- Liga 3 North Maluku
  - Champion (1): 2019
