= Kal Matali =

Kal Matali كل متلي
- Village

- Location within Iran
- Coordinates: 27°08′39″N 55°47′48″E
- Country: Iran
- Province: Hormozgan
- County: Bandar Abbas
- Bakhsh: Central
- Rural District: Gachin

Population (2006)
  - Total: 1,589
- Time zone: UTC+3:30 (IRST)
  - Summer (DST): UTC+4:30 (IRDT)

Kal Matali (Persian: كل متلي, also Romanized as Kal Matalī and Kal Matlī; also known as Lātīdān) is a village in Gachin Rural District, in the Central District of Bandar Abbas County, Hormozgan Province, Iran. At the 2006 census, its population was 1,589, in 325 families.
