= Tanjung Batu, Donggala Regency =

Tanjung Batu
- Location in Central Sulawesi and Indonesia Tanjung Batu (Indonesia)
- Coordinates: 0°42′20.17″S 119°45′24.5″E
- Country: Indonesia
- Province: Central Sulawesi
- Regency: Donggala Regency
- District: Banawa District
- Elevation: 82 ft (25 m)

Population (2010)
  - Total: 2,554
- Time zone: UTC+8 (Indonesia Central Standard Time)

Tanjung Batu is a village in Banawa district, Donggala Regency in Central Sulawesi province, Indonesia. Its population is 2554.

== Climate ==
Tanjung Batu has a dry tropical rainforest climate (Af) with moderate rainfall year-round. It is one of the driest places in Indonesia.

Climate data for Tanjung Batu
Month	Jan	Feb	Mar	Apr	May	Jun	Jul	Aug	Sep	Oct	Nov	Dec	Year
Mean daily maximum °C (°F)	30.3 (86.5)	30.5 (86.9)	30.7 (87.3)	30.7 (87.3)	31.1 (88.0)	30.2 (86.4)	29.3 (84.7)	30.8 (87.4)	30.8 (87.4)	32.0 (89.6)	31.1 (88.0)	30.8 (87.4)	30.7 (87.2)
Daily mean °C (°F)	26.6 (79.9)	26.7 (80.1)	26.9 (80.4)	26.8 (80.2)	27.4 (81.3)	26.6 (79.9)	25.8 (78.4)	26.8 (80.2)	26.6 (79.9)	27.6 (81.7)	27.0 (80.6)	27.0 (80.6)	26.8 (80.3)
Mean daily minimum °C (°F)	22.9 (73.2)	23.0 (73.4)	23.1 (73.6)	23.0 (73.4)	23.8 (74.8)	23.1 (73.6)	21.9 (71.4)	22.9 (73.2)	22.5 (72.5)	23.3 (73.9)	23.0 (73.4)	23.2 (73.8)	23.0 (73.4)
Average rainfall mm (inches)	96 (3.8)	67 (2.6)	84 (3.3)	82 (3.2)	66 (2.6)	116 (4.6)	84 (3.3)	88 (3.5)	108 (4.3)	62 (2.4)	76 (3.0)	70 (2.8)	999 (39.4)
Source: Climate-Data.org
