= Abu Bakrin Stadium =

Stadium in Magelang, Central Java

- Interactive map of Abu Bakrin Stadium
- Address: Magelang, Indonesia
- Location: Magelang, Central Java, Indonesia
- Coordinates: 7.487°S 110.217°E
- Owner: Magelang city government
- Operator: Magelang city government
- Capacity: 10,000
- Surface: Grass field

Tenant
- PPSM Sakti Magelang

Abu Bakrin Stadium is a football stadium in the city of Magelang, Indonesia. The stadium has a capacity of 10,000 people. It was the home stadium of PPSM Sakti Magelang until 2012.
