= Mitali Banerjee Ruths =

American-Canadian children's author and pediatrician

Mitali Banerjee Ruths (born 1982) is an American-Canadian children's author and pediatrician.

== Life ==
Ruths was born in New York, and grew up in Texas; her parents immigrated to the U.S. from West Bengal, India. There, her father worked for NASA as an engineer, and she attended Space Center Intermediate. After attending medical school, she had her pediatric internship in Houston.

Ruths began writing her Party Diaries series following the onset of the COVID-19 pandemic.

== Personal life ==
Ruths moved to Montreal, Canada in 2010. As of 2023, she, her husband, and their three children live in Montreal, where she works as a pediatrician.

== Publications ==
- Archie Celebrates Diwali. Charlesbridge Publishing. 2021-09-14. ISBN 978-1-62354-119-4.
- Archie Celebrates an Indian Wedding. Charlesbridge Publishing. 2024-04-30. ISBN 978-1-62354-418-8.
- Help the Kind Lion: An Acorn Book (The Inside Scouts #1). Scholastic Inc. 2024-02-06. ISBN 978-1-338-89500-1.

=== The Party Diaries ===
- Awesome Orange Birthday: A Branches Book (The Party Diaries #1). Scholastic Inc. 2023-01-03. ISBN 978-1-338-79964-4.
- Starry Henna Night: A Branches Book (The Party Diaries #2). Scholastic Inc. 2023-04-04. ISBN 978-1-338-79985-9.
- Top Secret Anniversary: A Branches Book (The Party Diaries #3). Scholastic Inc. 2023-10-31. ISBN 978-1-338-79992-7.
