= Persimura Musi Rawas =

Indonesian football club in South Sumatra

- Full name: Persatuan Sepakbola Indonesia Musi Rawas
- Nickname: Laskar Lanang Lian
- Founded: 1980; 46 years ago
- Ground: Petanang Stadium; Lubuklinggau, South Sumatra
- Capacity: 10,000
- Owner: Municipal government of Musi Rawas
- CEO: H. Rudi Irawan
- Manager: Yudi Fachriansyah
- Coach: Donny Fahamsyah
- League: Liga 4
- 2021: 4th, (South Sumatra zone)
Home colours	Away colours

Persatuan Sepakbola Indonesia Musi Rawas (simply known as Persimura) is an Indonesian football club based in Musi Rawas Regency, South Sumatra. They currently compete in the Liga 4 and their homeground is Petanang Stadium.

Persimura Musi Rawas's highest achievement was in 2017, they managed to become champions in the 2017 Liga 3 South Sumatra zone, and stopped in the Big 8 of the 2017 Liga 3, At that time Persimura Musi Rawas was defeated by Blitar United with a score of 1–3. Persimura's own achievements were followed by the women's team, in the 2019 Pertiwi Cup competition, those who represented South Sumatra managed to become champions after defeating Bangka Belitung in the Final.

== Players ==
=== Current squad ===
As of 17 March 2022

Note: Flags indicate national team as defined under FIFA eligibility rules; some limited exceptions apply. Players may hold more than one non-FIFA nationality.

No.	Pos.	Nation	Player
1	GK	IDN	Aldi Firmansyah
2	DF	IDN	Muhammad Farhan Tifani
3	DF	IDN	Amsal Leno Prayoga
5	DF	IDN	Fadhilla Hadyanto
6	MF	IDN	Septo Prasetyo
7	MF	IDN	Dwi Seto Winarco
8	MF	IDN	Desri Rizki Ramadona
9	MF	IDN	Yahya Moehaimin
10	MF	IDN	Vidi Seta Purba
11	MF	IDN	Exsya Setiawan
13	MF	IDN	Usodo
14	MF	IDN	Untung Wibowo (captain)

No.	Pos.	Nation	Player
15	MF	IDN	Sony Arya Wibowo
16	FW	IDN	Data Apriyadi
17	FW	IDN	Triatmono
18	FW	IDN	Rivanda Situmorang
19	DF	IDN	Ronaldo Yogi Firnando
20	DF	IDN	Eko Setiawan
21	DF	IDN	Indra Laya
22	GK	IDN	Jalu Prasetyo
23	DF	IDN	Rivaldo Parizki
29	DF	IDN	Rivaldo Sihombing
27	FW	IDN	Billy Dwi Nugroho
28	FW	IDN	Budiman Adi Wijaya

== Honours ==
- Liga 3 South Sumatra
  - Champion: 2017
