= Persis Sangihe =

Indonesian football club

- Full name: Persatuan Sepakbola Indonesia Sangihe
- Nickname: Laskar Bataha Santiago
- Founded: 2017; 9 years ago
- Ground: Gesit Tahuna Field; Tahuna, Sangihe Islands Regency
- Capacity: 1,000
- Owner: Askab PSSI Kepulauan Tahuna
- Manager: Aditya Seliang
- Coach: Handri Tatengkeng
- League: Liga 4
- 2021: 3rd, (North Sulawesi zone)
Home colours	Away colours

Persatuan Sepakbola Indonesia Sangihe or Persis Sangihe is an Indonesian football club based in Tahuna, Sangihe Islands Regency, North Sulawesi. They currently compete in the Liga 4.

== Honours ==
- Liga 3 North Sulawesi
  - Third-place: 2021
