= Arianto =

Arianto is an Indonesian name. Notable people with the name include:

- Nova Arianto (born 1979), Indonesian footballer;
- Ruy Arianto (born 2004), Indonesian footballer;
- Tintus Arianto Wibowo (born 1960), Indonesian tennis player.
