= PSBS Batusangkar =

Indonesian football club

- Full name: Persatuan Sepakbola Batusangkar dan Sekitarnya
- Founded: 1952; 74 years ago
- Ground: Gumarang Stadium; Batusangkar, Tanah Datar, West Sumatera
- Capacity: 1,000
- Owner: Askab PSSI Tanah Datar
- Chairman: Desril Chandra
- Manager: Bahrumsyah
- Coach: Zilnetriadi
- League: Liga 4
- 2021: 3rd in Group F, (West Sumatra zone)
Home colours	Away colours

Persatuan Sepakbola Batusangkar dan Sekitarnya is an Indonesian football club based in Batusangkar, Tanah Datar Regency, West Sumatra. They currently compete in the Liga 4.
