= Musi Rawas Regency =

Regency in South Sumatra, Indonesia

Coordinates: 3.0833°S 103.2000°E

Musi Rawas Regency Kabupaten Musi Rawas
- Regency
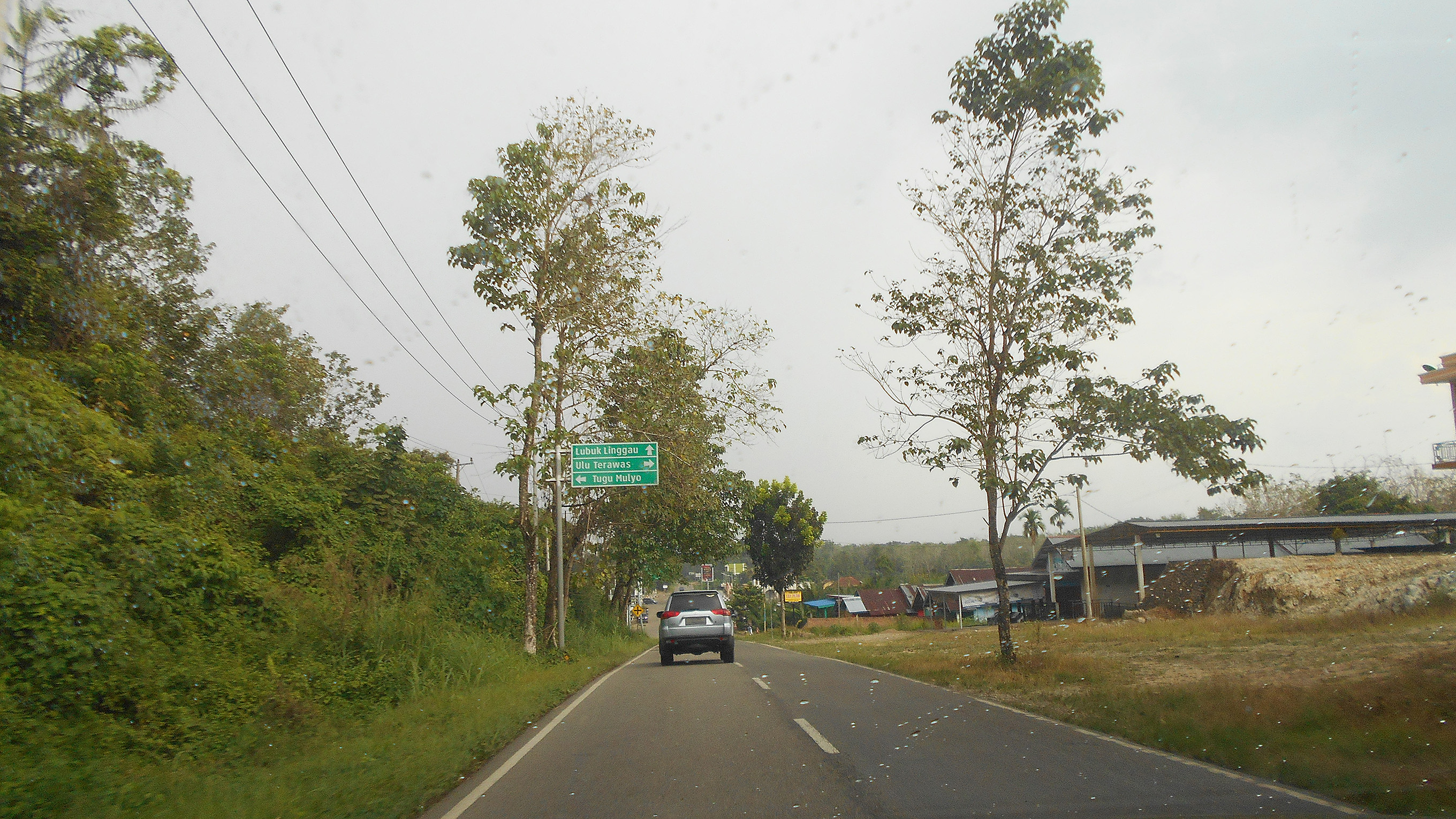
- The Trans-Sumatran Highway at Musi Rawas Regency in 2020

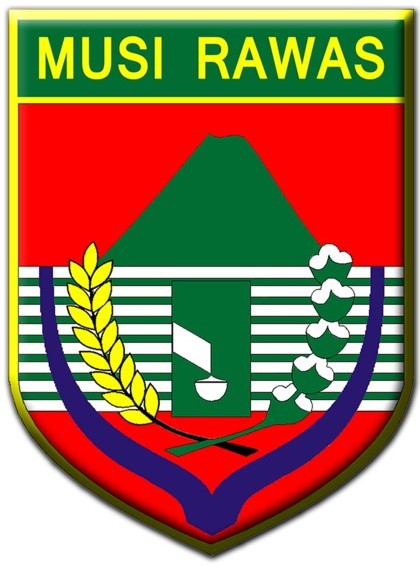
- Coat of arms

- Location in South Sumatra
- Country: Indonesia
- Province: South Sumatra
- Regency seat: Muara Beliti

Government
  - Regent: Ratna Machmud
  - Vice Regent: Suwarti Burlian

Area
  - Total: 6,357.17 km^{2} (2,454.52 sq mi)

Population (mid 2025 estimate)
  - Total: 415,744
  - Density: 65.3977/km^{2} (169.379/sq mi)
- Time zone: UTC+7 (WIB)
- Website: musirawaskab.go.id

Musi Rawas Regency is a regency of South Sumatra Province, Indonesia. Prior to 2013, it covered an area of 12,134.57 km^{2} and had a population of 524,919 at the 2010 Census; however on 10 June 2013 the northern half of the regency was split off to form a separate North Musi Rawas Regency. Previous to 2001, the Regency had also included the city of Lubuklinggau, which was split off to form an independent city outside the regency.

The area of the residual Regency from 2013 is 6,357.17 km^{2} and this had a population of 356,076 at the 2010 Census and 395,570 at the 2020 Census; the official estimate as at mid 2025 was 415,744 (comprising 212,340 males and 203,410 females). The regency seat is the town of Muara Beliti Baru. During the Dutch East Indies area it was known as Rawas District. The area is named for the Musi River and its tributary the Rawas River.

== History ==
In February 2010, Musi Rawas was subjected to serious flooding which submerged over 6,000 homes and affected thousands of hectares of land.

On 29 April 2013 there were a clash between local people from the northern part of Musi Rawas Regency (who blockaded the national road between Jambi and Palembang) and policemen who tried to lift the blockade. After 11 hours of negotiation had failed, four people were killed and six policemen were shot with traditional guns by protesters. People from northern Musi Rawas had called for a new regency to be split from the current Musi Rawas Regency; this new regency, called North Musi Rawas Regency (abbreviated often to Muratara Regency), was created in July 2013.

== Administrative districts ==
As at 2010, the Musi Rawas Regency was subdivided into twenty-one districts (kecamatan), but on 10 July 2013 the northernmost seven districts (Rupit, Rawas Ulu, Nibung, Rawas Ilir, Karang Dapo, Karang Jaya, and Ulu Rawas) were split off to form a new North Musi Rawas Regency (Musi Rawas Utara). The remaining fourteen districts are listed below with their areas and their populations at the 2010 Census and 2020 Census, together with the official estimates as at mid 2024. The table also includes the locations of the district administrative centres, the number of administrative villages in each district (comprising 186 rural desa and 13 urban kelurahan), and its post codes.

Kode Wilayah	Name of District (kecamatan)	Area in km^{2}	Pop'n Census 2010	Pop'n Census 2020	Pop'n Estimate mid 2024	Admin centre	No. of villages	Post code
16.05.10	Suku Tengah Lakitan Ulu	596.92	28,820	32,236	34,589	Terawas *	13	30771
16.05.11	Selangit	717.34	17,866	19,161	20,457	Selangit *	12	31625
16.05.19	Sumber Harta	103.78	16,892	18,432	19,766	Sumber Harta *	10	30772
16.05.01	Tugumulyo	67.71	43,137	46,839	49,766	Srikaton *	18	31662
16.05.13	Purwodadi	63.26	14,486	15,746	16,652	Purwodadi *	11	31668
16.05.09	Muara Beliti	175.63	22,363	26,449	29,133	Pasar Muara Beliti *	12	31661
16.05.18	Tiang Pumpung Kepungut	326.42	11,704	12,391	13,108	Muara Kati Baru I	10	31660
16.05.08	Jayaloka	160.46	14,433	16,113	16,918	Marga Tunggal *	13	31665
16.05.21	Suka Karya	121.53	12,852	14,956	15,968	Ciptodadi	8	31665
16.05.03	Muara Kelingi	645.82	35,386	41,687	46,603	Muara Kelingi *	21	31663
16.05.14	Bulan Tengah Suku Ulu	751.54	26,030	29,274	32,396	Bangun Jaya *	19	31652
16.05.20	Tuah Negeri	263.45	25,042	26,976	28,513	Lubuk Rumbai	11	31664
16.05.02	Muara Lakitan	1,963.54	38,974	40,616	44,712	Muara Lakitan *	20	31666
16.05.12	Megang Sakti	399.78	48,091	54,694	59,142	Megang Sakti I *	21	31657
	Totals	6,357.17	356,076	395,570	427,723	Muara Beliti	199	

Note: The 13 kelurahan in this regency comprise 11 of the district administrative centres (those asterisked above by *), together with Mangun Harjo (in Purwodadi District) and Talang Ubi (in Megang Sakti District).

== Gallery ==
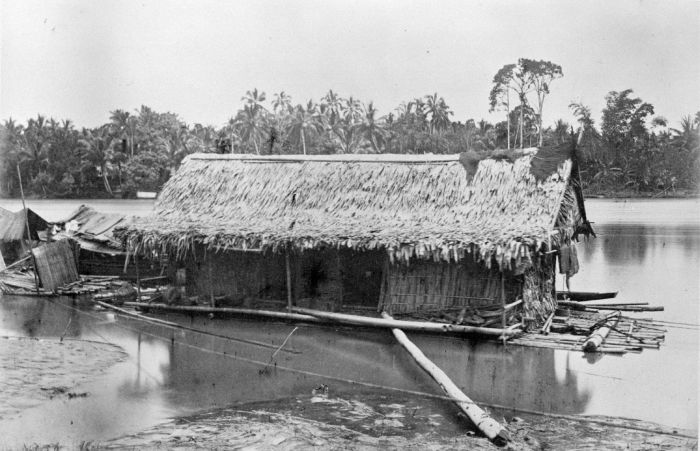
Houseboat on the Rawas River in what was then the Rawas District, Sumatra, Dutch East Indies, circa 1878

== See also ==
- Napal Licin, an area in Rawas
