= List of districts of South Sumatra =

The province of the South Sumatra in Indonesia is divided into regencies which are divided administratively into districts or kecamatan.

The districts of South Sumatra, with the regency each falls into, are as follows:

- Abab (Penukal Abab), Muara Enim
- Air Sugihan, Ogan Komering Ilir
- Alang-Alang Lebar, Palembang
- BKL Ulu Terawas, Musi Rawas
- BTS Ulu, Musi Rawas
- Babat Toman, Musi Banyuasin
- Banding Agung, Ogan Komering Ulu Selatan
- Banyuasin I, Banyuasin
- Banyuasin II, Banyuasin
- Banyuasin III, Banyuasin
- Batang Harileko, Musi Banyuasin
- Baturaja Barat, Ogan Komering Ulu
- Baturaja Timur, Ogan Komering Ulu
- Bayung Lencir, Musi Banyuasin
- Belitang II, Ogan Komering Ulu Timur
- Belitang III, Ogan Komering Ulu Timur
- Belitang, Ogan Komering Ulu Timur
- Benakat, Muara Enim
- Betung, Banyuasin
- Buay Madang, Ogan Komering Ulu Timur
- Buay Pemaca, Ogan Komering Ulu Selatan
- Buay Pemuka Peliung, Ogan Komering Ulu Timur
- Buay Runjung, Ogan Komering Ulu Selatan
- Buay Sandang Aji, Ogan Komering Ulu Selatan
- Bukit Kecil, Palembang
- Cambai, Prabumulih
- Cempaka, Ogan Komering Ulu Timur
- Cengal, Ogan Komering Ilir
- Dempo Selatan, Pagar Alam
- Dempo Tengah, Pagar Alam
- Dempo Utara, Pagar Alam
- Gandus, Palembang
- Gelumbang, Muara Enim
- Gunung Megang, Muara Enim
- Ilir Barat I, Palembang
- Ilir Barat II, Palembang
- Ilir Timur I, Palembang
- Ilir Timur II, Palembang
- Indralaya, Ogan Ilir
- Jarai, Lahat
- Jayaloka, Musi Rawas
- Jejawi, Ogan Komering Ilir
- Kalidoni, Palembang
- Karang Dapo, Musi Rawas
- Karang Jaya, Musi Rawas
- Kelekar, Muara Enim
- Keluang, Musi Banyuasin
- Kemuning, Palembang
- Kertapati, Palembang
- Kikim Barat, Lahat
- Kikim Selatan, Lahat
- Kikim Tengah, Lahat
- Kikim Timur, Lahat
- Kisam Tinggi, Ogan Komering Ulu Selatan
- Kota Agung, Lahat
- Kota Kayu Agung, Ogan Komering Ilir
- Lahat, Lahat
- Lais, Musi Banyuasin
- Lalan, Musi Banyuasin
- Lawang Kidul, Muara Enim
- Lembak, Muara Enim
- Lempuing Jaya, Ogan Komering Ilir
- Lengkiti, Ogan Komering Ulu
- Lintang Kanan, Lahat
- Lubai, Muara Enim
- Lubuk Batang, Ogan Komering Ulu
- Lubuklinggau Barat I, Lubuklinggau
- Lubuklinggau Barat II, Lubuklinggau
- Lubuklinggau Selatan I, Lubuklinggau
- Lubuklinggau Selatan II, Lubuklinggau
- Lubuklinggau Timur I, Lubuklinggau
- Lubuklinggau Timur II, Lubuklinggau
- Lubuklinggau Utara I, Lubuklinggau
- Lubuklinggau Utara II, Lubuklinggau
- Madang Suku I, Ogan Komering Ulu Timur
- Madang Suku II, Ogan Komering Ulu Timur
- Makarti Jaya, Banyuasin
- Mandi Aur, Muara Kelingi, Musi Rawas
- Martapura, Ogan Komering Ulu Timur
- Megang Sakti, Musi Rawas
- Mekakau Ilir, Ogan Komering Ulu Selatan
- Merapi, Lahat
- Mesuji, Ogan Komering Ilir
- Muara Belida, Muara Enim
- Muara Beliti, Musi Rawas
- Muara Enim, Muara Enim
- Muara Kelingi, Musi Rawas
- Muara Kuang, Ogan Ilir
- Muara Lakitan, Musi Rawas
- Muara Padang, Banyuasin
- Muara Pinang, Lahat
- Muara Rupit, Musi Rawas
- Muara Telang, Banyuasin
- Muaradua Kisam, Ogan Komering Ulu Selatan
- Muaradua, Ogan Komering Ulu Selatan
- Mulak Ulu, Lahat
- Nibung, Musi Rawas
- Pagar Alam Selatan, Pagar Alam
- Pagar Alam Utara, Pagar Alam
- Pajar Bulan, Lahat
- Pampangan, Ogan Komering Ilir
- Pasemah Air Keruh, Lahat
- Pedamaran, Ogan Komering Ilir
- Pematang Panggang, Ogan Komering Ilir
- Pemulutan, Ogan Ilir
- Pendopo Lintang, Empat Lawang
- Pendopo, Lahat
- Pengandonan, Ogan Komering Ulu
- Peninjauan, Ogan Komering Ulu
- Penukal Abab, Muara Enim
- Penukal Utara, Muara Enim
- Penukal, Muara Enim
- Plaju, Palembang
- Plakat Tinggi, Musi Banyuasin
- Prabumulih Barat, Prabumulih
- Prabumulih Timur, Prabumulih
- Pulau Beringin, Ogan Komering Ulu Selatan
- Pulau Pinang, Lahat
- Pulau Rimau, Banyuasin
- Purwodadi, Musi Rawas
- Rambang Dangku, Muara Enim
- Rambang Kapak Tengah, Prabumulih
- Rambang, Muara Enim
- Rambutan, Banyuasin
- Rantau Alai, Ogan Ilir
- Rantau Bayur, Banyuasin
- Rawas Ilir, Musi Rawas
- Rawas Ulu, Musi Rawas
- Sako, Palembang
- Sanga Desa, Musi Banyuasin
- Seberang Ulu I, Palembang
- Seberang Ulu II, Palembang
- Sekayu, Musi Banyuasin
- Selangit, Musi Rawas
- Sematang Borang, Palembang
- Semendawai Suku III, Ogan Komering Ulu Timur
- Semende Darat Laut, Muara Enim
- Semende Darat Tengah, Muara Enim
- Semende Darat Ulu, Muara Enim
- Semidang Aji, Ogan Komering Ulu
- Simpang, Ogan Komering Ulu Selatan
- Sirah Pulau Padang, Ogan Komering Ilir
- Sosoh Buay Rayap, Ogan Komering Ulu
- Sukarame, Palembang
- Sungai Keruh, Musi Banyuasin
- Sungai Lilin, Musi Banyuasin
- Sungai Rotan, Muara Enim
- Talang Kelapa, Banyuasin
- Talang Padang, Lahat
- Talang Ubi, Muara Enim
- Tanah Abang, Muara Enim
- Tanjung Agung, Muara Enim
- Tanjung Batu, Ogan Ilir
- Tanjung Lubuk, Ogan Komering Ilir
- Tanjung Raja, Ogan Ilir
- Tanjung Sakti, Lahat
- Tebing Tinggi, Lahat
- Tugumulyo, Musi Rawas
- Tulung Selapan, Ogan Komering Ilir
- Ujan Mas, Muara Enim
- Ulu Musi, Lahat
- Ulu Ogan, Ogan Komering Ulu
- Ulu Rawas, Musi Rawas
