= Gelora Bumi Kartini Stadium =

Stadium in Central Java, Indonesia

Coordinates: 6°35′01″S 110°39′49″E

- Interactive map of Gelora Bumi Kartini Stadium
- Location: Jepara, Jepara Regency, Central Java
- Capacity: 8,570
- Surface: Bermuda grass
- Field size: 105x68

Construction
- Cost: Rp. 12,000,000,000

Tenant
- Persijap Jepara (2008– )

Gelora Bumi Kartini Stadium (Indonesian: Stadion Gelora Bumi Kartini) is a multi-use stadium in Jepara, Indonesia. It is used mostly for football matches. The stadium holds 8,570 people.
