= Persijam Jambi =

Indonesian football club

Persijam
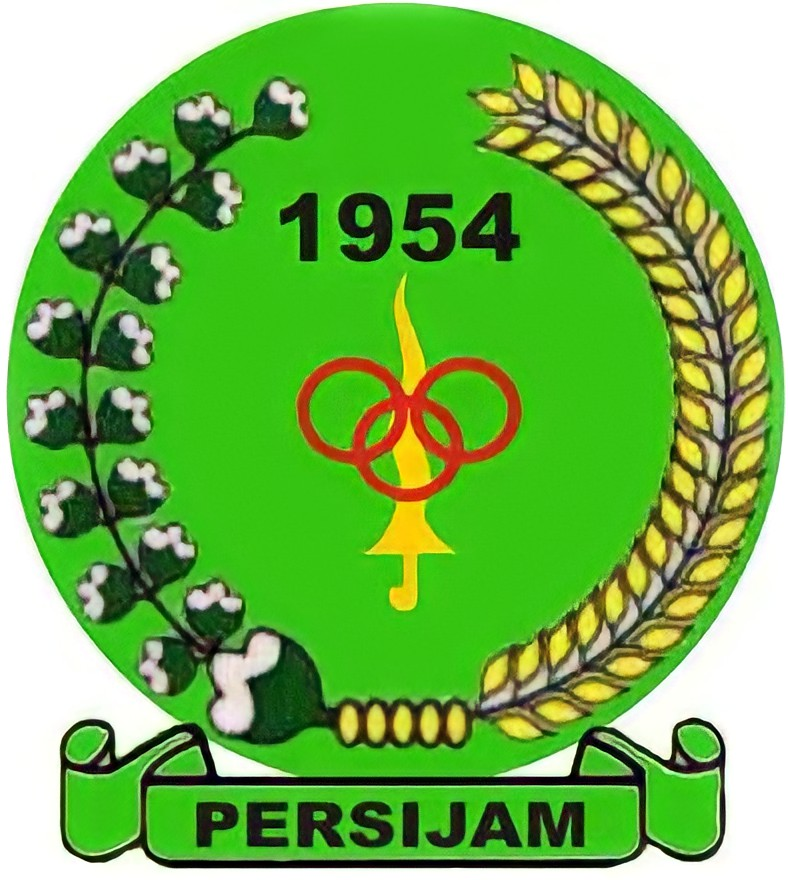
- Full name: Persatuan Sepakbola Indonesia Jambi
- Nickname: Laskar Pusako Betuah (Pusako Betuah Warriors)
- Founded: 1954; 72 years ago as Persatuan Sepakbola Indonesia Djambi (Persid)
- Ground: Persijam Stadium
- Capacity: 5,000
- Owner: Askot PSSI Jambi City
- Manager: Andang Fazri
- Coach: Afrizal Abbas
- League: Liga 3
- 2023: 3rd, Group A (Jambi zone)
Home colours	Away colours

Persatuan Sepakbola Indonesia Jambi (simply known as Persijam) is an Indonesian football club based in Jambi, the capital of Jambi Province. They are currently compete in Liga 3.

== Honours ==
- Liga 3 Jambi
  - Champions (1): 2017
