= PS Tanggamus =

Indonesian football club

- Full name: Perserikatan Sepakbola Tanggamus
- Nickname: Lumba-Lumba Teluk Semaka
- Founded: 1997; 29 years ago
- Ground: Tangsi Talangpadang Field
- Capacity: 2,000
- Owner: PSSI Tanggamus Regency
- Chairman: Iskandar Juned
- Coach: Anton Irawan
- League: Liga 4
- 2021: Quarter-finals, (Liga 3 Lampung zone)
Home colours	Away colours

Perserikatan Sepakbola Tanggamus (simply known as PS Tanggamus) is an Indonesian football club based in Tanggamus Regency, Lampung. They currently competes in Liga 4 Lampung zone.

== Honours ==
- U17 Soeratin Cup Lampung
  - Champions (3): 2016, 2017, 2021
