= 2025–26 Liga 4 West Kalimantan =

Liga 4 West Kalimantan
- Season: 2025–26
- Dates: 25 January – 8 February 2026
- Champions: Persiwah (1st title)
- Runner up: PS Kubu Raya
- National phase: Persiwah; PS Kubu Raya

The 2025–26 Liga 4 West Kalimantan will be the second season of Liga 4 West Kalimantan after the change in the structure of Indonesian football competition and serves as a qualifying round for the national phase of the 2025–26 Liga 4.

The competition is organised by the West Kalimantan Provincial PSSI Association.

== Teams ==
=== Participating teams ===
A total of 16 teams are competing in this season.

No	Team	Location	2024–25 season
1	Gabsis	Sambas Regency	Champions
2	PS Pulau Indah	Sambas Regency	Group stage (4th in Zone 1 Group A)
3	Kalbar United	Pontianak City	Quarter-finalist
4	Persipon	Pontianak City	Finalist
5	PS Delta Khatulistiwa	Pontianak City	—
6	PS Kubu Raya	Kubu Raya Regency	Group stage (3th in Zone 1 Group A)
7	MIRS7 Singkawang	Singkawang City	—
8	Persikat	Ketapang Regency	Group stage (3th in Zone 1 Group B)
9	Persibeng	Bengkayang Regency	—
10	PS Sanggau	Sanggau Regency	Quarter-finalist
11	SSS Sanggau	Sanggau Regency	—
12	Persista	Sintang Regency	Group stage (3th in Zone 2 Group B)
13	PS Gelora Sintang	Sintang Regency	Semi-finalist
14	Persimel	Melawi Regency	Semi-finalist
15	Sky	Mempawah Regency	—
16	Persiwah	Mempawah Regency	—

== Group stage ==
A total of 16 teams will be drawn into 4 groups. The group stage will be played in a home tournament format of single round-robin matches. The top two teams of each group will qualify for the knockout round.

=== Group A ===
All matches will be held at Sultan Syarif Abdurrahman Stadium, Pontianak and Perkasa Kodam XII/TPR Field, Kubu Raya.

Pos	Team	Pld	W	D	L	GF	GA	GD	Pts	Qualification	WAH	BKY	PON	MIR
1	Persiwah	3	3	0	0	5	1	+4	9	Qualification to the knockout round	—			
2	Persibeng	3	2	0	1	7	5	+2	6	Qualification to the knockout round		—		
3	Persipon	3	1	0	2	6	4	+2	3				—	
4	MIRS7 Singkawang	3	0	0	3	2	10	−8	0					—

Source: 2025–26 Liga 4 West Kalimantan
Legend: Blue = home team win; Yellow = draw; Red = away team win.
Rules for classification: 1) Points; 2) Head-to-head points; 3) Head-to-head goal difference; 4) Head-to-head goals scored; 5) Goal difference; 6) Goals scored; 7) Fair-play points; 8) Draw.

=== Group B ===
All matches will be held at Sultan Syarif Abdurrahman Stadium, Pontianak and Perkasa Kodam XII/TPR Field, Kubu Raya.

Pos	Team	Pld	W	D	L	GF	GA	GD	Pts	Qualification	PTA	GBS	SSS	SKY
1	Persista	3	3	0	0	4	0	+4	9	Qualification to the knockout round	—			
2	Gabsis	3	2	0	1	9	1	+8	6	Qualification to the knockout round		—		
3	SSS Sanggau	3	1	0	2	3	8	−5	3				—	
4	Sky	3	0	0	3	1	8	−7	0					—

Source: 2025–26 Liga 4 West Kalimantan
Legend: Blue = home team win; Yellow = draw; Red = away team win.
Rules for classification: 1) Points; 2) Head-to-head points; 3) Head-to-head goal difference; 4) Head-to-head goals scored; 5) Goal difference; 6) Goals scored; 7) Fair-play points; 8) Draw.

=== Group C ===
All matches will be held at Sultan Syarif Abdurrahman Stadium, Pontianak and Perkasa Kodam XII/TPR Field, Kubu Raya.

Pos	Team	Pld	W	D	L	GF	GA	GD	Pts	Qualification	KUN	SNG	KTP	GEL
1	Kalbar United	3	3	0	0	10	5	+5	9	Qualification to the knockout round	—			
2	PS Sanggau	3	2	0	1	5	5	0	6	Qualification to the knockout round		—		
3	Persikat	3	1	0	2	5	6	−1	3				—	
4	PS Gelora Sintang	3	0	0	3	2	6	−4	0					—

Source: 2025–26 Liga 4 West Kalimantan
Legend: Blue = home team win; Yellow = draw; Red = away team win.
Rules for classification: 1) Points; 2) Head-to-head points; 3) Head-to-head goal difference; 4) Head-to-head goals scored; 5) Goal difference; 6) Goals scored; 7) Fair-play points; 8) Draw.

=== Group D ===
All matches will be held at Sultan Syarif Abdurrahman Stadium, Pontianak and Perkasa Kodam XII/TPR Field, Kubu Raya.

Pos	Team	Pld	W	D	L	GF	GA	GD	Pts	Qualification	MEL	KRY	DTA	PUL
1	Persimel	3	2	1	0	5	1	+4	7	Qualification to the knockout round	—			
2	PS Kubu Raya	3	1	2	0	5	1	+4	5	Qualification to the knockout round		—		
3	PS Delta Khatulistiwa	3	1	0	2	3	7	−4	3				—	
4	PS Pulau Indah	3	0	1	2	1	5	−4	1					—

Source: 2025–26 Liga 4 West Kalimantan
Legend: Blue = home team win; Yellow = draw; Red = away team win.
Rules for classification: 1) Points; 2) Head-to-head points; 3) Head-to-head goal difference; 4) Head-to-head goals scored; 5) Goal difference; 6) Goals scored; 7) Fair-play points; 8) Draw.

== Knockout stage ==
The knockout stage will be played as a single match. If tied after regulation time, extra time and, if necessary, a penalty shoot-out will be used to decide the winning team. The top three teams will qualify to the national phase.

Quarter-finals
A1	Persiwah	0 (4)
B2	Gabsis	0 (3)
D1	Persimel	0
A2	Persibeng	1
C1	Kalbar United	1 (2)
D2	PS Kubu Raya	1 (4)
B1	Persista	1 (7)
C2	PS Sanggau	1 (6)

Semi-finals
Persiwah	1 (4)
Persibeng	1 (2)
PS Kubu Raya	2
Persista	1

Final
Persiwah	2
PS Kubu Raya	0
Third place play-off
Persibeng	0
Persista	3

== See also ==
- 2025–26 Liga 4
- 2025–26 Liga 4 Central Kalimantan
- 2025–26 Liga 4 East Kalimantan
- 2025–26 Liga 4 South Kalimantan
