= 2023–24 Liga 3 West Kalimantan =

Tournament details
- Country: Indonesia
- Venue: 1
- Dates: 9 – 25 January 2024
- Teams: 13

Final positions
- Champions: Kalbar United (1st title)
- Runners-up: Dodos
- Qualified for: 2023–24 Liga 3 National Phase

Tournament statistics
- Matches played: 22
- Goals scored: 79 (3.59 per match)

The 2023–24 Liga 3 West Kalimantan is the seventh season of Liga 3 West Kalimantan organized by Asprov PSSI West Kalimantan.

This competition was attended by 13 clubs. The winner of this competition will advance to the national phase.

Gabsis are the defending champion after winning it in the 2021 season.

== Teams ==
2023 Liga 3 West Kalimantan was attended by 13 teams.

No.	Team	Location
1	PS BPBE	Bengkayang Regency
2	Persikat	Ketapang Regency
3	Dodos	Kubu Raya Regency
4	PS Kubu Raya	Kubu Raya Regency
5	Persilan^{WD}	Landak Regency
6	Persimel	Melawi Regency
7	Kalbar United	Pontianak City
8	Persipon	Pontianak City
9	Delta Khatulistiwa	Pontianak City
10	Gabsis	Sambas Regency
11	Pulau Indah	Sambas Regency
12	MIRS 7	Singkawang City
13	Persista	Sintang Regency
14	Gelora Sintang	Sintang Regency

== Venue ==
- Sultan Syarif Abdurrahman Stadium, Pontianak City

== Group stage ==
=== Group A ===
Pos	Team	Pld	W	D	L	GF	GA	GD	Pts	Qualification
1	Kalbar United	2	2	0	0	20	1	+19	6	Advance to the Knockout Stage
2	PS Delta Khatulistiwa	2	1	0	1	2	7	−5	3	Advance to the Knockout Stage
3	MIRS 7	2	0	0	2	2	16	−14	0	

Source: Asprov PSSI West Kalimantan
9 January 2024
13.30 WIB (Note: The MIRS 7 vs PS Delta Khatulistiwa match was originally scheduled for 9 January 2024 at 13.30 WIB. The first half ended with a score MIRS 7 0−1 PS Delta Khatulistiwa and the match was stopped due to bad weather. The match is scheduled to resume on 10 January 2024 at 08.00 WIB.)

MIRS 7	1–2	PS Delta Khatulistiwa
	Report

Sultan Syarif Abdurrahman Stadium, Pontianak City

11 January 2024
15.30 WIB

Kalbar United	14–1	MIRS 7
	Report

Sultan Syarif Abdurrahman Stadium, Pontianak City

14 January 2024
15.30 WIB

Kalbar United	6–0	PS Delta Khatulistiwa
	Report

Sultan Syarif Abdurrahman Stadium, Pontianak City

=== Group B ===
Pos	Team	Pld	W	D	L	GF	GA	GD	Pts	Qualification
1	PS Kubu Raya	2	2	0	0	4	0	+4	6	Advance to the Knockout Stage
2	Persipon	2	1	0	1	3	1	+2	3	Advance to the Knockout Stage
3	PS BPBE	2	0	0	2	0	6	−6	0	

Source: Asprov PSSI West Kalimantan
10 January 2024
15.30 WIB

PS Kubu Raya	3–0	PS BPBE
	Report

Sultan Syarif Abdurrahman Stadium, Pontianak City

12 January 2024
15.30 WIB

Persipon	0–1	PS Kubu Raya
	Report

Sultan Syarif Abdurrahman Stadium, Pontianak City

14 January 2024
13.30 WIB

PS BPBE	0–3	Persipon
	Report

Sultan Syarif Abdurrahman Stadium, Pontianak City

=== Group C ===
Pos	Team	Pld	W	D	L	GF	GA	GD	Pts	Qualification
1	Dodos	3	3	0	0	11	3	+8	9	Advance to the Knockout Stage
2	Persista	3	2	0	1	6	3	+3	6	Advance to the Knockout Stage
3	Gabsis	3	1	0	2	3	7	−4	3	
4	PS Gelora Sintang	3	0	0	3	3	10	−7	0	

Source: Asprov PSSI West Kalimantan
10 January 2024
09.00 WIB (Note: The PS Gelora Sintang vs Persista match was originally scheduled for 9 January 2024 at 15.30 WIB, was rescheduled due to bad weather reasons to 10 January 2024 at 09.00 WIB.)

PS Gelora Sintang	1–4	Persista
	Report

Sultan Syarif Abdurrahman Stadium, Pontianak City
10 January 2024
13.30 WIB

Dodos	6–0	Gabsis
	Report

Sultan Syarif Abdurrahman Stadium, Pontianak City

12 January 2024
13.30 WIB

Gabsis	3–0	PS Gelora Sintang
	Report

Sultan Syarif Abdurrahman Stadium, Pontianak City
13 January 2024
13.30 WIB

Persista	1–2	Dodos
	Report

Sultan Syarif Abdurrahman Stadium, Pontianak City

15 January 2024
13.30 WIB

Dodos	3–2	PS Gelora Sintang
	Report

Sultan Syarif Abdurrahman Stadium, Pontianak City
16 January 2024
14.30 WIB

Gabsis	0–1	Persista
	Report

Sultan Syarif Abdurrahman Stadium, Pontianak City

=== Group D ===
Pos	Team	Pld	W	D	L	GF	GA	GD	Pts	Qualification
1	Persikat	2	1	1	0	3	0	+3	4	Advance to the Knockout Stage
2	Pulau Indah	2	0	2	0	2	2	0	2	Advance to the Knockout Stage
3	Persimel	2	0	1	1	2	5	−3	1	

Source: Asprov PSSI West Kalimantan
11 January 2024
13.30 WIB

Persimel	0–3	Persikat
	Report

Sultan Syarif Abdurrahman Stadium, Pontianak City

13 January 2024
15.30 WIB

Pulau Indah	2–2	Persimel
	Report

Sultan Syarif Abdurrahman Stadium, Pontianak City

15 January 2024
15.30 WIB

Pulau Indah	0–0	Persikat
	Report

Sultan Syarif Abdurrahman Stadium, Pontianak City

== Knockout stage ==
=== Bracket ===
Quarter-finals
18 January 2024 – Pontianak
D1	Persikat (p)	1 (5)
B2	Persipon	1 (4)
19 January 2024 – Pontianak
C1	Dodos	2
A2	PS Delta Khatulistiwa	1
18 January 2024 – Pontianak
B1	PS Kubu Raya	0 (5)
D2	Pulau Indah (p)	0 (6)
19 January 2024 – Pontianak
A1	Kalbar United	3
C2	Persista	0

Semi-finals
21 January 2024 – Pontianak
Persikat	0
Dodos	2
22 January 2024 – Pontianak
Pulau Indah	1 (2)
Kalbar United (p)	1 (3)

Final
25 January 2024 – Pontianak
Dodos	2
Kalbar United	4

=== Quarter-finals ===
18 January 2024
13.15 WIB

Persikat	1–1 (a.e.t.)	Persipon
	Report
Penalties
	5–4

Sultan Syarif Abdurrahman Stadium, Pontianak City

18 January 2024
15.15 WIB

PS Kubu Raya	0–0 (a.e.t.)	Pulau Indah
	Report
Penalties
	5–6

Sultan Syarif Abdurrahman Stadium, Pontianak City

19 January 2024
13.15 WIB

Kalbar United	3–0	Persista
	Report

Sultan Syarif Abdurrahman Stadium, Pontianak City

19 January 2024
15.15 WIB

Dodos	2–1	PS Delta Khatulistiwa
	Report

Sultan Syarif Abdurrahman Stadium, Pontianak City

=== Semi-finals ===
21 January 2024
13.30 WIB

Persikat	0–2	Dodos
	Report

Sultan Syarif Abdurrahman Stadium, Pontianak City

22 January 2024
15.30 WIB

Pulau Indah	1–1 (a.e.t.)	Kalbar United
	Report
Penalties
	2–3

Sultan Syarif Abdurrahman Stadium, Pontianak City

=== Final ===
25 January 2024
14.30 WIB

Dodos	2–4	Kalbar United
	Report

Sultan Syarif Abdurrahman Stadium, Pontianak City

== Qualification to the national phase ==
As of 13 March 2024, PSSI confirmed that Dodos withdrew from the national phase due to the club's financial problems. Instead, the remaining slot was given to Persikat as the semifinalist of 2023–24 Liga 3 West Kalimantan.

Team	Method of qualification	Date of qualification	Qualified to
Kalbar United	Champions of 2023–24 Liga 3 West Kalimantan	25 January 2024	2023–24 Liga 3 National Phase
Persikat	Semifinalist of 2023–24 Liga 3 West Kalimantan	13 March 2024	2023–24 Liga 3 National Phase

== See also ==
- 2023–24 Liga 3 National phase
