= 2024–25 Liga 4 West Kalimantan =

Liga 4 West Kalimantan
- Season: 2024–25
- Dates: 18–27 February 2025
- Champions: Gabsis (1st title)
- National phase: Gabsis
- Matches: 24
- Goals: 59 (2.46 per match)
- Biggest win: Persikara 1–6 Kalbar United (21 February 2025)
- Highest scoring: Persikara 1–6 Kalbar United (21 February 2025)

The 2024–25 Liga 4 West Kalimantan was the inaugural season of Liga 4 West Kalimantan after the change in the structure of Indonesian football competition and serves as a qualifying round for the national phase of the 2024–25 Liga 4.

The competition is organised by the West Kalimantan Provincial PSSI Association.

== Teams ==
=== Participating teams ===
A total of 13 teams are competing in this season.

No	Team	Location	2023–24 season
Zone 1
1	Gabsis	Sambas Regency	First round (3rd in Group C)
2	PS Pulau Indah	Sambas Regency	Semi-finalist
3	Kalbar United	Pontianak City	Champions
4	Persipon	Pontianak City	Quarter-finalist
5	PS Kubu Raya	Kubu Raya Regency	Quarter-finalist
6	Persikara	North Kayong Regency	—
7	Persikat	Ketapang Regency	Semi-finalist

No	Team	Location	2023–24 season
Zone 2
8	Persilan	Landak Regency	—
9	PS Sanggau	Sanggau Regency	—
10	PS Sekadau	Sekadau Regency	—
11	Persista	Sintang Regency	—
12	PS Gelora Sintang	Sintang Regency	Group stage (4th in Group C)
13	Persimel	Melawi Regency	Group stage (3rd in Group D)

== Schedule ==
The schedule of the competition is as follows.

Round	Matchday	Date	
Round	Matchday	Zone 1	Zone 2
Preliminary round
Preliminary round	Matchday 1	18–19 February 2025	18 February 2025
Preliminary round	Matchday 2	19–20 February 2025	19 February 2025
Preliminary round	Matchday 3	20–21 February 2025	20 February 2025
Preliminary round	Matchday 4	22 February 2025	—
Knockout round
Knockout round	Zonal Semi-finals	23 February 2025	21 February 2025
Knockout round	Zonal final	24 February 2025	22 February 2025
Championship round
Championship round	Semi-finals	25–26 February 2025	
Championship round	Final	27 February 2025	

== Preliminary round ==
A total of 13 teams will be divided into two zones based on the geographical location of their home base. Each zone will consist of two groups. The first round will be played in a home tournament format of single round-robin matches.

The top two teams of each group will qualify for the knockout round.

=== Zone 1 ===
==== Group A ====
All matches will be held at Sultan Syarif Abdurrahman Stadium, Pontianak.

Pos	Team	Pld	W	D	L	GF	GA	GD	Pts	Qualification	GAB	PON	KBU	PUL
1	Gabsis	3	2	1	0	4	2	+2	7	Qualification to the knockout round	—	—	—	2–1
2	Persipon	3	1	2	0	4	3	+1	5	Qualification to the knockout round	1–1	—	—	—
3	PS Kubu Raya	3	1	1	1	4	2	+2	4		0–1	1–1	—	
4	PS Pulau Indah	3	0	0	3	2	7	−5	0		—	1–2	0–3	—

Source: Liga 4 West Kalimantan
Legend: Blue = home team win; Yellow = draw; Red = away team win.
Rules for classification: 1) Points; 2) Head-to-head points; 3) Head-to-head goal difference; 4) Head-to-head goals scored; 5) Goal difference; 6) Goals scored; 7) Fair-play points; 8) Draw.

Group A Matches

Matchday 1 (18 February 2025)
18 February 2025
13.30 WIB (UTC+7)

PS Pulau Indah	1–2	Persipon
	Report

Sultan Syarif Abdurrahman Stadium, Pontianak
18 February 2025
15.15 WIB (UTC+7)

PS Kubu Raya	0–1	Gabsis
	Report

Sultan Syarif Abdurrahman Stadium, Pontianak

Matchday 2 (19 February 2025)
19 February 2025
15.15 WIB (UTC+7)

Persipon	1–1	Gabsis
	Report

Sultan Syarif Abdurrahman Stadium, Pontianak

Matchday 3 (20–21 February 2025)
20 February 2025
15.15 WIB (UTC+7)

PS Kubu Raya	1–1	Persipon
	Report

Sultan Syarif Abdurrahman Stadium, Pontianak

21 February 2025
13.30 WIB (UTC+7)

Gabsis	2–1	PS Pulau Indah
	Report

Sultan Syarif Abdurrahman Stadium, Pontianak

Matchday 4 (22 February 2025)
22 February 2025
15.15 WIB (UTC+7)

PS Pulau Indah	0–3	PS Kubu Raya
	Report

Sultan Syarif Abdurrahman Stadium, Pontianak

==== Group B ====
All matches will be held at Sultan Syarif Abdurrahman Stadium, Pontianak.

Pos	Team	Pld	W	D	L	GF	GA	GD	Pts	Qualification	KAL	KRA	KAT
1	Kalbar United	2	2	0	0	8	1	+7	6	Qualification to the knockout round	—	—	2–0
2	Persikara	2	1	0	1	3	7	−4	3	Qualification to the knockout round	1–6	—	—
3	Persikat	2	0	0	2	1	4	−3	0		—	1–2	—

Source: Liga 4 West Kalimantan
Legend: Blue = home team win; Yellow = draw; Red = away team win.
Rules for classification: 1) Points; 2) Head-to-head points; 3) Head-to-head goal difference; 4) Head-to-head goals scored; 5) Goal difference; 6) Goals scored; 7) Fair-play points; 8) Draw.

Group B Matches

Matchday 1 (19 February 2025)
19 February 2025
13.30 WIB (UTC+7)

Kalbar United	2–0	Persikat
	Report

Sultan Syarif Abdurrahman Stadium, Pontianak

Matchday 2 (20 February 2025)
20 February 2025
13.30 WIB (UTC+7)

Persikat	1–2	Persikara
	Report

Sultan Syarif Abdurrahman Stadium, Pontianak

Matchday 3 (21 February 2025)
21 February 2025
15.15 WIB (UTC+7)

Persikara	1–6	Kalbar United
	Report

Sultan Syarif Abdurrahman Stadium, Pontianak

=== Zone 2 ===
==== Group A ====
All matches will be held at Baning Stadium, Sintang.

Pos	Team	Pld	W	D	L	GF	GA	GD	Pts	Qualification	SGU	SKD	LAN
1	PS Sanggau	2	2	0	0	4	0	+4	6	Qualification to the knockout round	—	—	3–0
2	PS Sekadau	2	1	0	1	2	1	+1	3	Qualification to the knockout round	0–1	—	—
3	Persilan	2	0	0	2	0	5	−5	0		—	0–2	—

Source: Liga 4 West Kalimantan
Legend: Blue = home team win; Yellow = draw; Red = away team win.
Rules for classification: 1) Points; 2) Head-to-head points; 3) Head-to-head goal difference; 4) Head-to-head goals scored; 5) Goal difference; 6) Goals scored; 7) Fair-play points; 8) Draw.

Group A Matches

Matchday 1 (18 February 2025)
18 February 2025
13.30 WIB (UTC+7)

Persilan	0–2	PS Sekadau
	Report

Baning Stadium, Sintang

Matchday 2 (19 February 2025)
19 February 2025
15.15 WIB (UTC+7)

PS Sekadau	0–1	PS Sanggau
	Report

Baning Stadium, Sintang

Matchday 3 (20 February 2025)
20 February 2025
15.15 WIB (UTC+7)

PS Sanggau	3–0	Persilan
	Report

Baning Stadium, Sintang

==== Group B ====
All matches will be held at Baning Stadium, Sintang.

Pos	Team	Pld	W	D	L	GF	GA	GD	Pts	Qualification	GEL	MEL	STA
1	PS Gelora Sintang	2	1	0	1	3	3	0	3	Qualification to the knockout round	—	3–2	—
2	Persimel	2	1	0	1	3	3	0	3	Qualification to the knockout round	—	—	1–0
3	Persista	2	1	0	1	1	1	0	3		1–0	—	—

Source: Liga 4 West Kalimantan
Legend: Blue = home team win; Yellow = draw; Red = away team win.
Rules for classification: 1) Points; 2) Head-to-head points; 3) Head-to-head goal difference; 4) Head-to-head goals scored; 5) Goal difference; 6) Goals scored; 7) Fair-play points; 8) Draw.

Group B Matches

Matchday 1 (18 February 2025)
18 February 2025
15.15 WIB (UTC+7)

Persimel	1–0	Persista
	Report

Baning Stadium, Sintang

Matchday 2 (19 February 2025)
19 February 2025
13.30 WIB (UTC+7)

Persista	1–0	PS Gelora Sintang
	Report

Baning Stadium, Sintang

Matchday 3 (20 February 2025)
20 February 2025
13.30 WIB (UTC+7)

PS Gelora Sintang	3–2	Persimel
	Report

Baning Stadium, Sintang

== Knockout round ==
The knockout round will be played as a single match. If tied after regulation time, extra time and, if necessary, a penalty shoot-out will be used to decide the winning team. The finalist team in each zone will qualify for the championship round.

=== Bracket ===
Zone 1

Zonal semi-finals
23 February 2025 – Pontianak
B1	Kalbar United	1 (2)
A2	Persipon (p)	1 (3)
23 February 2025 – Pontianak
A1	Gabsis	2
B2	Persikara	0

Zonal final
24 February 2025 – Pontianak
Persipon (p)	1 (6)
Gabsis	1 (5)

Zone 2

Zonal semi-finals
21 February 2025 – Sintang
B1	PS Sanggau	0 (3)
A2	Persimel (p)	0 (4)
21 February 2025 – Sintang
A1	PS Gelora Sintang	1
B2	PS Sekadau	0

Zonal final
22 February 2025 – Sintang
Persimel	2
PS Gelora Sintang	4

=== Zonal semi-finals ===
==== Zone 1 ====
23 February 2025
13.30 WIB (UTC+7)

Kalbar United	1–1	Persipon
	Report
Penalties
	2–3

Sultan Syarif Abdurrahman Stadium, Pontianak

23 February 2025
15.15 WIB (UTC+7)

Gabsis	2–0	Persikara
	Report

Sultan Syarif Abdurrahman Stadium, Pontianak

==== Zone 2 ====
21 February 2025
13.30 WIB (UTC+7)

PS Gelora Sintang	1–0	PS Sekadau
	Report

Baning Stadium, Sintang

21 February 2025
15.15 WIB (UTC+7)

PS Sanggau	0–0	Persimel
	Report
Penalties
	3–4

Baning Stadium, Sintang

=== Zonal final ===
==== Zone 1 ====
24 February 2025
15.15 WIB (UTC+7)

Persipon	1–1	Gabsis
	Report
Penalties
	6–5

Sultan Syarif Abdurrahman Stadium, Pontianak

==== Zone 2 ====
22 February 2025
14.15 WIB (UTC+7)

Persimel	2–4	PS Gelora Sintang
	Report

Baning Stadium, Sintang

== Championship round ==
The championship round will be played as a single match. If tied after regulation time, extra time and, if necessary, a penalty shoot-out will be used to decide the winning team.

=== Bracket ===
Semi-finals
25 February 2025 – Pontianak
Persipon	2
Persimel	1
26 February 2025 – Pontianak
PS Gelora Sintang	2 (2)
Gabsis (p)	2 (4)

Final
27 February 2025 – Pontianak
Persipon	0 (3)
Gabsis (p)	0 (4)

=== Semi-finals ===
25 February 2025
14.00 WIB (UTC+7)

Persipon	2–1	Persimel
	Report

Sultan Syarif Abdurrahman Stadium, Pontianak

26 February 2025
14.00 WIB (UTC+7)

PS Gelora Sintang	2–2	Gabsis
	Report
Penalties
	2–4

Sultan Syarif Abdurrahman Stadium, Pontianak

=== Final ===
27 February 2025
14.00 WIB (UTC+7)

Persipon	0–0	Gabsis
	Report
Penalties
	3–4

Sultan Syarif Abdurrahman Stadium, Pontianak

== See also ==
- 2024–25 Liga 4
