= 2016 ISC Liga Nusantara =

ISC Liga Nusantara
- Season: 2016
- Champions: Perseden Denpasar

The 2016 ISC Liga Nusantara or 2016 Indonesia Soccer Championship C season is the second edition of Liga Nusantara after the Second Division and Third Division merged on 2014 season. This season is managed by competition committee of Province Association for qualification round and managed by PT. GTS in national round. The competition started in May 2016.

Perseden Denpasar became champion after beating PSN Ngada 2–0 in the final.

== Format ==
Each Provincial Association only given one representative to the national round. 32 teams will perform in the final round, consist of 30 teams of provincial competition winners and two winning teams from play-off of the bottom four teams. National round took place in several provinces that have been determined by PT GTS with the following format:

- Preliminary round contains 32 teams divided into eight groups. Two teams from each group will advance to the knockout round.

== Teams ==
Each Provincial Association only given one representative to the national round.

=== Sumatra Region ===
#	Province	Teams
1	Aceh	PS Pidie Jaya
2	North Sumatra	PS POP Asahan
3	West Sumatra	PS GAS Sawahlunto
4	Riau	Riau
5	Riau Islands	YSK 757 Karimun
6	Jambi	Merangin
7	Bangka-Belitung	PS Beltim
8	South Sumatra	PSAD Kodam II/Sriwijaya
9	Bengkulu	PS Benteng
10	Lampung	Persilat Central Lampung

=== Java Region ===
#	Province	Teams
1	Banten	Persikota Tangerang
2	Jakarta	Urakan
3	West Java	Persikotas Tasikmalaya
4	Central Java	Persiku Kudus
5	Yogyakarta	Gama
6	East Java	Blitar United

=== Kalimantan Region ===
#	Province	Teams
1	South Kalimantan	Peseban Banjarmasin
2	West Kalimantan	PS Delta Khatulistiwa
3	Central Kalimantan	PS PU Putra Palangkaraya
4	East Kalimantan	Persikutim East Kutai
5	North Kalimantan	PS Pelangi Utara Malinau

=== Sulawesi Region ===
#	Province	Teams
1	North Sulawesi	Persma 1960 Manado
2	South Sulawesi	Perseka Bosowa
3	Central Sulawesi	Persipal Palu
4	West Sulawesi	PS Mamuju Utama
5	Southeast Sulawesi	UHO
6	Gorontalo	PS Boalemo

=== Bali and Nusa Tenggara Region ===
#	Province	Teams
1	Bali	Perseden Denpasar
2	East Nusa Tenggara	PSN Ngada
3	West Nusa Tenggara	PSKT West Sumbawa

=== Maluku and Papua Region ===
#	Province	Teams
1	Maluku	Nusaina
2	North Maluku	Persiter Ternate
3	West Papua	did not participate
4	Papua	did not participate

== National round ==
National round will take place in Central Java and Special Region of Yogyakarta.

=== Group stage ===
32 teams from each provincial association will compete. Matches for the Group stage will be played from 19 to 25 November 2016. All group will play half season round-robin.

==== Group A ====
This group will be held in Jenderal Hoegeng Stadium, Pekalongan and Moh Sarengat Stadium, Batang Regency.

Pos	Team	Pld	W	D	L	GF	GA	GD	Pts	Qualification or relegation
1	Perseden Denpasar	3	2	1	0	8	1	+7	7	Advance to Round of 16
2	Blitar United	3	2	0	1	4	5	−1	6	Advance to Round of 16
3	PSAD Kodam II/Sriwijaya	3	1	1	1	5	2	+3	4	
4	PS POP Asahan	3	0	0	3	1	10	−9	0	

Updated to match(es) played on 25 November 2016. Source: ISC
Rules for classification: 1) points; 2) head-to-head; 3) goal difference; 4) number of goals scored.

Match 1

19 November 2016	Blitar United	0–4	Perseden Denpasar	Pekalongan
				Stadium: Jenderal Hoegeng Stadium

19 November 2016	PSAD Kodam II/Sriwijaya	4–0	PS POP Asahan	Batang Regency
				Stadium: Moh Sarengat Stadium

Match 2

22 November 2016	Blitar United	1–0	PSAD Kodam II/Sriwijaya	Pekalongan
				Stadium: Jenderal Hoegeng Stadium

22 November 2016	PS POP Asahan	0–3	Perseden Denpasar	Batang Regency
				Stadium: Moh Sarengat Stadium

Match 3

25 November 2016	PS POP Asahan	1–3	Blitar United	Pekalongan
				Stadium: Jenderal Hoegeng Stadium

25 November 2016	Perseden Denpasar	1–1	PSAD Kodam II/Sriwijaya	Batang Regency
				Stadium: Moh Sarengat Stadium

==== Group B ====
This group will be held in Jatidiri Stadium, Semarang and Citarum Stadium, Semarang.

Pos	Team	Pld	W	D	L	GF	GA	GD	Pts	Qualification or relegation
1	Persikotas Tasikmalaya	3	3	0	0	9	1	+8	9	Advance to Round of 16
2	UHO	3	2	0	1	5	3	+2	6	Advance to Round of 16
3	Persma 1960 Manado	3	1	0	2	3	5	−2	3	
4	Urakan	3	0	0	3	2	10	−8	0	

Updated to match(es) played on 25 November 2016. Source: ISC
Rules for classification: 1) points; 2) head-to-head; 3) goal difference; 4) number of goals scored.

Match 1

19 November 2016	UHO	1–3	Persikotas Tasikmalaya	Semarang
				Stadium: Jatidiri Stadium

19 November 2016	Urakan	2–3	Persma 1960 Manado	Semarang
				Stadium: Citarum Stadium

Match 2

22 November 2016	UHO	3–0	Urakan	Semarang
				Stadium: Jatidiri Stadium

22 November 2016	Persma 1960 Manado	0–2	Persikotas Tasikmalaya	Semarang
				Stadium: Citarum Stadium

Match 3

25 November 2016	Persma 1960 Manado	0–1	UHO	Semarang
				Stadium: Jatidiri Stadium

25 November 2016	Persikotas Tasikmalaya	4–0	Urakan	Semarang
				Stadium: Citarum Stadium

==== Group C ====
This group will be held in Pandan Arang Stadium, Ungaran.

Pos	Team	Pld	W	D	L	GF	GA	GD	Pts	Qualification or relegation
1	Persiter Ternate	3	2	1	0	4	1	+3	7	Advance to Round of 16
2	PS Pidie Jaya	3	1	2	0	2	0	+2	5	Advance to Round of 16
3	PSKT West Sumbawa	3	0	2	1	1	2	−1	2	
4	Riau	3	0	1	2	0	4	−4	1	

Updated to match(es) played on 25 November 2016. Source: ISC
Rules for classification: 1) points; 2) head-to-head; 3) goal difference; 4) number of goals scored.

Match 1

19 November 2016	Persiter Ternate	0–0	PS Pidie Jaya	Ungaran
				Stadium: Pandan Arang Stadium

19 November 2016	PSKT West Sumbawa	0–0	Riau	Ungaran
				Stadium: Pandan Arang Stadium

Match 2

22 November 2016	Persiter Ternate	2–1	PSKT West Sumbawa	Ungaran
				Stadium: Pandan Arang Stadium

22 November 2016	Riau	0–2	PS Pidie Jaya	Ungaran
				Stadium: Pandan Arang Stadium

Match 3

25 November 2016	Riau	0–2	Persiter Ternate	Ungaran
				Stadium: Pandan Arang Stadium

25 November 2016	PS Pidie Jaya	0–0	PSKT West Sumbawa	Ungaran
				Stadium: Pandan Arang Stadium

==== Group D ====
This group will be held in Gelora Bumi Kartini Stadium, Jepara.

Pos	Team	Pld	W	D	L	GF	GA	GD	Pts	Qualification or relegation
1	Persikutim East Kutai	3	2	1	0	5	3	+2	7	Advance to Round of 16
2	Persikota Tangerang	3	2	0	1	8	3	+5	6	Advance to Round of 16
3	Peseban Banjarmasin	3	1	1	1	3	3	0	4	
4	PS GAS Sawahlunto	3	0	0	3	5	12	−7	0	

Updated to match(es) played on 25 November 2016. Source: ISC
Rules for classification: 1) points; 2) head-to-head; 3) goal difference; 4) number of goals scored.

Match 1

19 November 2016	Peseban Banjarmasin	2–1	PS GAS Sawahlunto	Jepara
				Stadium: Gelora Bumi Kartini Stadium

19 November 2016	Persikota Tangerang	0–1	Persikutim East Kutai	Jepara
				Stadium: Gelora Bumi Kartini Stadium

Match 2

22 November 2016	Peseban Banjarmasin	0–1	Persikota Tangerang	Jepara
				Stadium: Gelora Bumi Kartini Stadium

22 November 2016	Persikutim East Kutai	3–2	PS GAS Sawahlunto	Jepara
				Stadium: Gelora Bumi Kartini Stadium

Match 3

25 November 2016	Persikutim East Kutai	1–1	Peseban Banjarmasin	Jepara
				Stadium: Gelora Bumi Kartini Stadium

25 November 2016	PS GAS Sawahlunto	2–7	Persikota Tangerang	Jepara
				Stadium: Gelora Bumi Kartini Stadium

==== Group E ====
This group will be held in Wergu Wetan Stadium, Kudus.

Pos	Team	Pld	W	D	L	GF	GA	GD	Pts	Qualification or relegation
1	Persiku Kudus	3	3	0	0	9	0	+9	9	Advance to Round of 16
2	PS Mamuju Utama	3	1	1	1	7	7	0	4	Advance to Round of 16
3	PS Benteng	3	1	1	1	4	7	−3	4	
4	PS Beltim	3	0	0	3	3	9	−6	0	

Updated to match(es) played on 25 November 2016. Source: ISC
Rules for classification: 1) points; 2) head-to-head; 3) goal difference; 4) number of goals scored.

Match 1

19 November 2016	PS Mamuju Utama	0–2	Persiku Kudus	Kudus
				Stadium: Wergu Wetan Stadium

19 November 2016	PS Benteng	2–1	PS Beltim	Kudus
				Stadium: Wergu Wetan Stadium

Match 2

22 November 2016	PS Mamuju Utama	2–2	PS Benteng	Kudus
				Stadium: Wergu Wetan Stadium

22 November 2016	PS Beltim	0–2	Persiku Kudus	Kudus
				Stadium: Wergu Wetan Stadium

Match 3

25 November 2016	PS Beltim	2–5	PS Mamuju Utama	Kudus
				Stadium: Wergu Wetan Stadium

25 November 2016	Persiku Kudus	4–0	PS Benteng	Kudus
				Stadium: Wergu Wetan Stadium

==== Group F ====
This group will be held in Sapta Marga Stadium, Magelang.

Pos	Team	Pld	W	D	L	GF	GA	GD	Pts	Qualification or relegation
1	PS Delta Khatulistiwa	2	2	0	0	5	2	+3	6	Advance to Round of 16
2	YSK 757 Karimun	2	1	0	1	4	3	+1	3	Advance to Round of 16
3	PS Boalemo	2	1	0	1	2	6	−4	3	
4	Perseka Bosowa	0	0	0	0	0	0	0	0	Disqualified

Updated to match(es) played on 26 November 2016. Source: ISC
Rules for classification: 1) points; 2) head-to-head; 3) goal difference; 4) number of goals scored.

Match 1

19 November 2016	PS Boalemo	1–3	PS Delta Khatulistiwa	Magelang
				Stadium: Sapta Marga Stadium

Match 2

22 November 2016	PS Delta Khatulistiwa	2–1	YSK 757 Karimun	Magelang
				Stadium: Sapta Marga Stadium

Match 3

26 November 2016	YSK 757 Karimun	3–1	PS Boalemo	Magelang
				Stadium: Sapta Marga Stadium

==== Group G ====
This group will be held in Sriwedari Stadium, Surakarta.

Pos	Team	Pld	W	D	L	GF	GA	GD	Pts	Qualification or relegation
1	Persilat Central Lampung	3	3	0	0	11	3	+8	9	Advance to Round of 16
2	PSPU Putra Palangkaraya	3	1	1	1	4	5	−1	4	Advance to Round of 16
3	Merangin	3	0	2	1	2	7	−5	2	
4	Nusa Ina	3	0	1	2	0	2	−2	1	

Updated to match(es) played on 25 November 2016. Source: ISC
Rules for classification: 1) points; 2) head-to-head; 3) goal difference; 4) number of goals scored.

Match 1

19 November 2016	PSPU Putra Palangkaraya	2–4	Persilat Central Lampung	Surakarta
				Stadium: R. Maladi Stadium

19 November 2016	Merangin	0–0	Nusa Ina	Boyolali
				Stadium: Pandan Arang Stadium

Match 2

22 November 2016	PSPU Putra Palangkaraya	1–1	Merangin	Surakarta
				Stadium: Sriwedari Stadium

22 November 2016	Nusa Ina	0–1	Persilat Central Lampung	Surakarta
				Stadium: Sriwedari Stadium

Match 3

25 November 2016	Nusa Ina	0–1	PSPU Putra Palangkaraya	Surakarta
				Stadium: Sriwedari Stadium

25 November 2016	Persilat Central Lampung	6–1	Merangin	Surakarta
				Stadium: Sriwedari Stadium

==== Group H ====
This group will be held in Sultan Agung Stadium, Bantul.

Pos	Team	Pld	W	D	L	GF	GA	GD	Pts	Qualification or relegation
1	PSN Ngada	3	3	0	0	12	1	+11	9	Advance to Round of 16
2	Persipal Palu	3	2	0	1	4	4	0	6	Advance to Round of 16
3	PS Pelangi Utara Malinau	3	0	1	2	3	11	−8	1	
4	Gama	3	0	1	2	4	7	−3	1	

Updated to match(es) played on 25 November 2016. Source: ISC
Rules for classification: 1) points; 2) head-to-head; 3) goal difference; 4) number of goals scored.

Match 1

19 November 2016	Persipal Palu	1–0	PS Pelangi Utara Malinau	Bantul
				Stadium: Sultan Agung Stadium

19 November 2016	Gama	0–2	PSN Ngada	Bantul
				Stadium: Sultan Agung Stadium

Match 2

22 November 2016	Persipal Palu	2–1	Gama	Bantul
				Stadium: Sultan Agung Stadium

22 November 2016	PSN Ngada	7–0	PS Pelangi Utara Malinau	Bantul
				Stadium: Sultan Agung Stadium

Match 3

25 November 2016	PSN Ngada	3–1	Persipal Palu	Bantul
				Stadium: Sultan Agung Stadium

25 November 2016	PS Pelangi Utara Malinau	3–3	Gama	Bantul
				Stadium: Sultan Agung Stadium

=== Knockout stage ===
==== Round of 16 ====
Matches for the Round of 16 will be played at 28 November 2016.

28 November 2016	Perseden Denpasar	1–1 (5–4 p)	UHO	Jepara
15:30				Stadium: Gelora Bumi Kartini Stadium

28 November 2016	Persikotas Tasikmalaya	0–1	Blitar United	Jepara
19:00				Stadium: Gelora Bumi Kartini Stadium

28 November 2016	Persiter Ternate	0–1	Persikota Tangerang	Magelang Regency
15:30				Stadium: Gemilang Stadium

28 November 2016	Persikutim East Kutai	0–1	PS Pidie Jaya	Magelang
15:30				Stadium: Sapta Marga Stadium

28 November 2016	Persiku Kudus	1–0	YSK 757 Karimun	Kudus
15:30				Stadium: Wergu Wetan Stadium

28 November 2016	PS Delta Khatulistiwa	0–2	PS Mamuju Utama	Kudus
19:00				Stadium: Wergu Wetan Stadium

28 November 2016	Persilat Central Lampung	0–1	Persipal Palu	Bantul
15:30				Stadium: Sultan Agung Stadium

28 November 2016	PSN Ngada	1–1 (4–2 p)	PSPU Putra Palangkaraya	Bantul
19:00				Stadium: Sultan Agung Stadium

==== Quarter-finals ====
Matches for the quarter-finals will be played at 2 December 2016.

2 December 2016	Perseden Denpasar	5–0	Persikota Tangerang	Bantul
15:30				Stadium: Sultan Agung Stadium

2 December 2016	Blitar United	1–0	PS Pidie Jaya	Bantul
19:00				Stadium: Sultan Agung Stadium

2 December 2016	Persiku Kudus	2–1	Persipal Palu	Kudus
15:30				Stadium: Wergu Wetan Stadium

2 December 2016	PS Mamuju Utama	2–3	PSN Ngada	Kudus
19:00				Stadium: Wergu Wetan Stadium

==== Semi-finals ====
Matches for Semi-finals will be played at 6 December 2016.

6 December 2016	Perseden Denpasar	1–0	Persiku Kudus	Bantul
15:00				Stadium: Sultan Agung Stadium

6 December 2016	Blitar United	1–3	PSN Ngada	Bantul
19:00				Stadium: Sultan Agung Stadium

==== Third-place ====
Matches for Third Place Play-off will be played at 11 December 2016.

11 December 2016	Persiku Kudus	1–2	Blitar United	Surakarta
15:00				Stadium: Manahan Stadium

==== Final ====
Matches for Final will be played at 11 December 2016.

11 December 2016	Perseden	2–0	PSN Ngada	Surakarta
19:00	Andika Dian 17'; Andik Zulianto 42'			Stadium: Manahan Stadium; Attendance: 377; Referee: Ikhsan Prasetya Jati

== Champions ==
Champions
Perseden Denpasar
1st title

== See also ==
- 2016 Indonesia Soccer Championship A
- 2016 Indonesia Soccer Championship B
- 2016 Indonesia Soccer Championship U-21
- 2016 Soeratin Cup
