= 2021 Liga 3 West Kalimantan =

Tournament details
- Dates: 9 October 2021 – 28 October 2021
- Teams: 10

Final positions
- Champions: Gabsis (1st title)
- Runners-up: Delta Khatulistiwa

Tournament statistics
- Matches played: 24
- Goals scored: 54 (2.25 per match)

The 2021 Liga 3 West Kalimantan will be the sixth season of Liga 3 West Kalimantan as a qualifying round for the national round of the 2021–22 Liga 3.

Persikat Ketapang were the defending champion.

== Teams ==
There are 10 teams participated in the league this season, divided into 2 groups of five.

Team	Location
Gabsis Sambas	Sambas
Persikat Ketapang	Ketapang
Persimel Melawi	Melawi
Persipon Pontianak	Pontianak
Persiwah Mempawah	Mempawah
PS Delta Khatulistiwa	Pontianak
PS Kota Singkawang	Singkawang
PS Kubu Raya	Great Kubu
PS Sanggau	Sanggau
Sambas Putra	Sambas

== Group stage ==
=== Group A ===
Pos	Team	Pld	W	D	L	GF	GA	GD	Pts	Qualification
1	Gabsis Sambas	4	3	1	0	9	1	+8	10	Advanced to Semi final
2	PS Delta Khatulistiwa	4	2	2	0	3	1	+2	8	Advanced to Semi final
3	Persiwah Mempawah	4	1	2	1	5	9	−4	5	
4	PS Kota Singkawang (H)	4	0	2	2	5	7	−2	2	
5	Persimel Melawi	4	0	1	3	1	5	−4	1	

Updated to match(es) played on 18 October 2021. Source: Liga 3 Kalimantan Barat
(H) Hosts

=== Group B ===
Pos	Team	Pld	W	D	L	GF	GA	GD	Pts	Qualification
1	Persipon Pontianak (H)	4	3	1	0	7	2	+5	10	Advanced to Semi final
2	Persikat Ketapang	4	2	1	1	8	3	+5	7	Advanced to Semi final
3	PS Kubu Raya	4	1	1	2	3	7	−4	4	
4	PS Sanggau	4	0	3	1	2	3	−1	3	
5	Sambas Putra	4	0	2	2	1	6	−5	2	

Updated to match(es) played on 18 October 2021. Source: Liga 3 Kalimantan Barat
(H) Hosts

== Knockout stage ==
=== Semi final ===
Leg 1

October 19, 2021
15.20 UTC+7

Gabsis Sambas	2–0	Persikat Ketapang
	Report

Kodam XII Field, Tanjungpura
October 20, 2021
15.20 UTC+7

Persipon Pontianak	2–2	PS Delta Khatulistiwa
	Report

Kodam XII Field, Tanjungpura

Leg 2

October 21, 2021
15.20 UTC+7

Persikat Ketapang	1–0	Gabsis Sambas
	Report

Kodam XII Field, Tanjungpura

Gabsis Sambas won 2–1 on aggregate.

October 22, 2021
15.20 UTC+7

PS Delta Khatulistiwa	0–1	Persipon Pontianak (W.O.)
	Report

Kodam XII Field, Tanjungpura

=== Final ===
Leg 1

October 24, 2021
15.20 UTC+7

Gabsis Sambas	0–1	PS Delta Khatulistiwa
	Report

Kodam XII Field, Tanjungpura

Leg 2

October 28, 2021
08:30 UTC+7

PS Delta Khatulistiwa	0–1	Gabsis Sambas
	Report
Penalties
Penalty scored Penalty missed	3–4	Penalty scored Penalty missed

Kodam XII Field, Tanjungpura

Gabsis Sambas won 4–3 on penalty shoot-out.
