= Rian Firmansyah =

Indonesian professional football player

Personal information
- Full name: Muhammad Rian Firmansyah
- Date of birth: 16 December 1998 (age 27)
- Place of birth: Pontianak, Indonesia
- Height: 1.60 m (5 ft 3 in)
- Position: Right winger

Team information
- Current team: Kalbar United
- Number: 10

Senior career*
| Years | Team | Apps | (Gls) |
| 2017–2018 | Persipon Pontianak | 14 | (0) |
| 2019 | Sarawak | 5 | (0) |
| 2019–2021 | Bali United | 1 | (0) |
| 2021 | PSM Makassar | 2 | (0) |
| 2022–2023 | Persipal Palu | 3 | (0) |
| 2024– | Kalbar United | 11 | (0) |
- * Club domestic league appearances and goals as of 17:50, 23 February 2025 (UTC)

Muhammad Rian Firmansyah (born 16 December 1998) is an Indonesian professional footballer who plays as a right winger for Liga 4 club Kalbar United.

== Club career ==
=== Sarawak FA ===
He was signed for Sarawak FA from Persipon to play in the Malaysia Premier League on 15 January 2019.

=== Bali United ===
Rian signed a year-and-a-half long contract with Bali United F.C. (BUFC) on 15 September 2019, after a month-long trial with the club in which he competed in Trofeo Hamengku Buwono X. BUFC registered him for 2019 Liga 1 to complete its quota of U-23 players because Hanis Sagara Putra was out injured.

Rian made his BUFC debut in Liga 1 on 16 December 2019, coming in as a substitute for Irfan Bachdim in a match against Arema F.C.

=== PSM Makassar ===
In 2021, Rian signed a contract with Liga 1 club PSM Makassar. Rian made his debut on 5 September 2021, again as a substitute in a match against Arema F.C. at the Pakansari Stadium in Cibinong.

== Career statistics ==
=== Club ===
As of match played 23 February 2025

| Club | Season | League | | | Cup | | Continental | | Other | | Total | |
| Club | Season | Division | Apps | Goals | Apps | Goals | Apps | Goals | Apps | Goals | Apps | Goals |
|---|---|---|---|---|---|---|---|---|---|---|---|---|
| Persipon Pontianak | 2017 | Liga 2 | 14 | 0 | 0 | 0 | 0 | 0 | 0 | 0 | 14 | 0 |
| Sarawak | 2019 | Malaysia Premier League | 5 | 0 | 0 | 0 | 0 | 0 | 0 | 0 | 5 | 0 |
| Bali United | 2019 | Liga 1 | 1 | 0 | 0 | 0 | 0 | 0 | 0 | 0 | 1 | 0 |
| Bali United | 2020 | Liga 1 | 0 | 0 | 0 | 0 | 0 | 0 | 0 | 0 | 0 | 0 |
| PSM Makassar | 2021 | Liga 1 | 2 | 0 | 0 | 0 | 0 | 0 | 0 | 0 | 2 | 0 |
| Persipal Palu | 2022 | Liga 2 | 3 | 0 | 0 | 0 | 0 | 0 | 0 | 0 | 3 | 0 |
| Kalbar United | 2023–24 | Liga 3 | 8 | 0 | 0 | 0 | 0 | 0 | 0 | 0 | 8 | 0 |
| Kalbar United | 2024–25 | Liga 4 | 3 | 0 | 0 | 0 | 0 | 0 | 0 | 0 | 3 | 0 |
| Career total | | | 36 | 0 | 0 | 0 | 0 | 0 | 0 | 0 | 36 | 0 |

== Honours ==
=== Club ===
Bali United

- Liga 1: 2019
