= Gala Pagamo =

Indonesian footballer (born 2006)

Personal information
- Full name: Gala Pagamo
- Date of birth: 11 August 2006 (age 20)
- Place of birth: Payakumbuh, Indonesia
- Height: 1.78 m (5 ft 10 in)
- Position: Winger

Team information
- Current team: PSM Makassar
- Number: 18

Youth career
- 2021: PPLP West Sumatra
- 2021: Gasliko 50 Kota
- 2022: PSP Padang
- 2023: PON West Sumatra
- 2023: Semen Padang U20

Senior career*
Years	Team	Apps	(Gls)
2024–2025	Semen Padang	20	(3)
2025–	PSM Makassar	5	(0)

International career^{‡}
2025	Indonesia U20	1	(0)
- * Club domestic league appearances and goals as of 16 October 2026 ‡ National team caps and goals as of 30 January 2025

Gala Pagamo (born 11 August 2006) is an Indonesian professional footballer who plays as a winger for Super League club PSM Makassar.

== Club career ==
Born in Payakumbuh, he started his career at PPLP West Sumatra and Gasliko Youth.

=== Semen Padang ===
In 2023, Pagamo joined Semen Padang youth academy and he officially joined Semen Padang first squad for the 2024–25 season. Pagamo did not get minutes to play at the beginning of the competition, but he managed to show his quality. On 18 October 2024, Pagamo made his league debut for the team, also scored his first league goal in a 2–3 lose against PSBS Biak. On 1 November 2024, Pagamo scored equalizer in a 1–1 draw over Persib Bandung. He added his third goals of the season on 21 November 2024 with one goal against PSM Makassar in a 1–1 draw.

== International career ==
In July 2023, it was reported that Pagamo received a call-up from the Indonesia U-17 to take part in the selection of the U17 national team which is prepared to appear for the 2023 FIFA U-17 World Cup.

In December 2024, Pagamo was called up to the Indonesia U-20 team for a training camp, to be held in Jakarta as part of the preparations for the 2025 AFC U-20 Asian Cup. On 30 January 2025, Pagamo made his debut for the under-20 team against India U-20, in a 4–0 win in a friendly match.

== Career statistics ==
=== Club ===
As of 6 September 2026

Club	Season	League		Cup		Continental		Other		Total	
Club	Season	Apps	Goals	Apps	Goals	Apps	Goals	Apps	Goals	Apps	Goals
Semen Padang	2024–25	20	3	0	0	–		0	0	20	3
PSM Makassar	2025–26	3	0	0	0	–		0	0	3	0
PSM Makassar	2026–27	1	0	0	0	–		0	0	1	0
Career total		24	3	0	0	0	0	0	0	24	3

== Honours ==
Individual

- Liga 1 Young Player of the Month: October/November 2024
