= 2022 Liga 3 Gorontalo =

Gorontalo Governor's Cup Liga 3

Tournament details
- Country: Indonesia
- Dates: 28 August 2022 – TBD 2022
- Teams: 27

Final positions
- Champions: Persidago Gorontalo
- Qualified for: 2022 Liga 3 National Round

Tournament statistics
- Matches played: 64
- Goals scored: 314 (4.91 per match)

The 2022 Liga 3 Gorontalo or the official name Gorontalo Governor's Cup Liga 3, is the fifth edition of Liga 3 Gorontalo organized by Asprov PSSI Gorontalo.

Followed by 27 clubs. The winner of this competition will immediately advance to the national round.

Persidago Gorontalo is the defending champion after winning it in the 2021 season.

== Teams ==
2022 Liga 3 Gorontalo was attended by 26 teams from regencies and cities in Gorontalo who registered with the Asprov PSSI Gorontalo.

No	Team	Location
01	Abdi United	Bone Bolango Regency
02	IPPOT Tapa	Bone Bolango Regency
03	Predator	Bone Bolango Regency
04	Mahardika	Boalemo Regency
05	Paguyuman All Star	Boalemo Regency
06	PS Boalemo	Boalemo Regency
07	Panua GFC	Pohuwato Regency
08	PSP Pohuwato	Pohuwato Regency
09	Mipo FC Pohuwato	Pohuwato Regency
10	Basmi	Gorontalo Regency
11	Boliyohuto	Gorontalo Regency
12	Dulamayo	Gorontalo Regency
13	Lakeya	Gorontalo Regency
14	Likot	Gorontalo Regency
15	Panipi Raya	Gorontalo Regency
16	Persidago Gorontalo	Gorontalo Regency
17	Persikota Talaga	Gorontalo Regency
18	Sparadis United	Gorontalo Regency
19	Telaga Biru	Gorontalo Regency
20	FC Gorut	North Gorontalo Regency
21	Persital Talumolo	Gorontalo
22	Muara Tirta	Gorontalo
23	Kreasindo	Gorontalo
24	Rajawali Gorontalo	Gorontalo
25	Gorontalo United	Gorontalo
26	Brigade Pesisir	Gorontalo

== Venues ==
- Merdeka Stadium, Gorontalo City
- 23 January Stadium, Gorontalo Regency
- Pemuda Boalemo Stadium, Boalemo Regency
- 25 February Stadium, Pohuwato Regency

== Group stage ==
=== Group A ===
Pos	Team	Pld	W	D	L	GF	GA	GD	Pts	Qualification	PSL	RGF	PKT	IPP	DUL	AUN	SUN
1	Persital	5	5	0	0	22	2	+20	15	Advance to Knockout stage	—			2–0		4–1	
2	Rajawali Gorontalo (H)	6	4	0	2	19	9	+10	12	Advance to Knockout stage	1–2	—	3–2	1–2	3–1	3–2	8–0
3	Persikota	5	4	0	1	10	4	+6	12	Advance to Knockout stage			—	1–0	2–0	1–0	
4	IPPOT Tapa	5	3	0	2	9	5	+4	9	Advance to Knockout stage				—		2–1	
5	Dulamayo	5	2	0	3	11	16	−5	6		0–9				—	4–2	
6	Abdi United	5	0	0	5	6	14	−8	0							—	
7	Sparadis United	5	0	0	5	1	28	−27	0		0–5		1–4	0–5	0–6		—

Updated to match(es) played on 21 September 2022. Source: Liga 3 2022 Gorontalo
(H) Hosts

=== Group B ===
Pos	Team	Pld	W	D	L	GF	GA	GD	Pts	Qualification	PDG	PRA	MTR	LKT	BPR	TBI	BMI
1	Persidago (H)	6	5	0	1	44	6	+38	15	Advance to Knockout stage	—	3–4	6–0	9–0	4–0	9–0	13–2
2	Panipi Raya	4	4	0	0	20	5	+15	12	Advance to Knockout stage		—	6–1		8–0		
3	Muara Tirta	5	2	1	2	22	18	+4	7	Advance to Knockout stage			—	3–3			4–3
4	Likot	4	2	1	1	12	16	−4	7	Advance to Knockout stage				—			
5	Brigade Pesisir	5	1	0	4	6	20	−14	3 (Note: Head-to-head points: Brigade Pesisir (+1) 3 pts; Telaga Biru (0); 3 pts Basmi (-1) 3 pts.)					1–4	—		
6	Telaga Biru	5	1	0	4	6	30	−24	3			1–2	0–14		3–5	—	2–0
7	Basmi	5	1	0	4	9	24	−15	3					3–5	1–0		—

Updated to match(es) played on 3 Oktober 2022. Source: Liga 3 2022 Gorontalo
(H) Hosts

=== Group C ===
Pos	Team	Pld	W	D	L	GF	GA	GD	Pts	Qualification	PSB	GUN	PAG	KSO	BYO	FCG
1	PS Boalemo (H)	5	5	0	0	21	2	+19	15	Advance to Knockout stage	—	2–1	2–0	5–1	5–0	7–0
2	Gorontalo United	5	4	0	1	23	2	+21	12	Advance to Knockout stage		—				6–0
3	Paguyaman All Star	5	2	1	2	8	10	−2	7 (Note: Head-to-head results: Paguyaman All Star 3–3 Kreasindo.)	Advance to Knockout stage		0–4	—	3–3	2–0	3–1
4	Kreasindo	5	2	1	2	9	17	−8	7	Advance to Knockout stage		0–8		—	1–0	4–1
5	Boliyohuto	5	1	0	4	1	12	−11	3			0–4			—	1–0
6	FC Gorut	5	0	0	5	2	21	−19	0							—

Source: Liga 3 2022 Gorontalo
(H) Hosts

=== Group D ===
Pos	Team	Pld	W	D	L	GF	GA	GD	Pts	Qualification	MDA	PSP	PGF	LAK	MPO	PRE
1	Mahardika	5	4	1	0	14	3	+11	13	Advance to Knockout stage	—		3–1	0–0	5–0	2–1
2	PSP Pohuwato (H)	5	3	1	1	14	10	+4	10	Advance to Knockout stage	1–4	—	1–1	4–0	4–3	4–2
3	Panua GFC	5	1	3	1	7	7	0	6	Advance to Knockout stage			—	0–0	2–2	3–1
4	Lakeya	4	0	3	1	1	5	−4	3	Advance to Knockout stage				—	1–1	
5	Mipo	5	0	3	2	7	13	−6	3						—	1–1
6	Predator	4	0	1	3	5	10	−5	1							—

Updated to match(es) played on 21 September 2022. Source: Liga 3 2022 Gorontalo
(H) Hosts

== Knockout stage ==
Wait for the completion of the group phase first.
