= 2021–22 Liga 3 (Indonesia) =

Fourth season of the Liga 3 in Indonesia

Liga 3
- Season: 2021–22
- Dates: Provincial round: 23 September 2021 – 12 January 2022; National round: 6 February – 30 March 2022
- Champions: Karo United (1st title)
- Promoted: Karo United; Putra Delta Sidoarjo; PSDS; Mataram Utama; Deltras; Persikab; Persipa; Gresik United
- Matches: 127
- Goals: 535 (4.21 per match)
- Best player: Rian Ramadan (Karo United)
- Top goalscorer: Mochamad Adam Malik (11 goals)
- Highest scoring: Panipi Raya 1–10 Persida (13 February 2022)

The 2021–22 Liga 3 is the fifth season of the Liga 3 under its current name, the sixth season under its current league structure, and the only amateur league football competition in Indonesia.

Persijap were the defending champions from the 2019 season after the 2020 season was cancelled due to COVID-19 pandemic in Indonesia.

== Team changes ==
The following teams changed division after the 2019 season.

=== To Liga 3 ===
Relegated from Liga 2

- PSGC
- Persibat
- Bandung United
- Madura
- Persatu
- PSMP

==== From Liga 3 ====
Promoted to Liga 2

- Persijap
- PSKC
- KS Tiga Naga
- Persekat
- Putra Sinar Giri (now became AHHA PS Pati)
- Semeru (now became PS Hizbul Wathan)

== Overview ==
In this season, the regional round stage are not held due to COVID-19 pandemic, so teams that qualify from the provincial round will immediately qualify for the national round.

=== Regulations ===
1. The player was born 1 January 1999 to 31 December 2003
2. It is allowed to register 5 (five) senior players with a maximum of 3 (three) senior players registered in the List of Players (DSP).
3. The maximum number of registered players are 35 players
4. The coach must have AFC C License
5. The maximum number of registered team officials are 10
6. Registration of players through the SIAP online system (PSSI Information and Administration System)

== Provincial round ==
These teams are the representatives from their provincial league to be competing in national round.

**Sumatra**
Provincial league	Qualified teams
Aceh	**PSBL**
Aceh	Galacticos Bireuen
Aceh	PSLS
North Sumatra	**PSDS**
North Sumatra	YOB Belawan
North Sumatra	Karo United
West Sumatra	**PSKB**
West Sumatra	Gasliko
Riau	**PS Siak**
Riau	Tornado
Riau Islands	**757 Kepri Jaya**
Jambi	**Jambi United**
South Sumatra	**PS Palembang**
Bangka Belitung Islands	**Belitong**
Bangka Belitung Islands	PS Bangka Setara
Bengkulu	**Benteng HB**
Lampung	**AD Sport**

**Kalimantan**
Provincial league	Qualified teams
West Kalimantan	**Gabsis**
Central Kalimantan
South Kalimantan	**Persemar**
South Kalimantan	Batulicin Putra 69
East Kalimantan	**Persikutim**
East Kalimantan	Persisam United
North Kalimantan

**Java**
Provincial league	Qualified teams
Banten	**Persikota**
Banten	Farmel
Banten	Serpong City
Jakarta	**Batavia**
Jakarta	ASIOP
Jakarta	UMS 1905
West Java	**Persikab**
West Java	Bandung United
West Java	Persikasi
West Java	PCB Persipasi
West Java	PSGC
West Java	Citeureup Raya
Central Java	**Persipa**
Central Java	Persebi
Central Java	Persak
(Special Region of Yogyakarta) Yogyakarta	**Mataram Utama**
(Special Region of Yogyakarta) Yogyakarta	Sleman United
East Java	**NZR Sumbersari**
East Java	Persedikab
East Java	Gresik United
East Java	Persewangi
East Java	Persinga
East Java	Deltras
East Java	Persida
East Java	Putra Delta Sidoarjo

**Lesser Sunda Islands**
Provincial league	Qualified teams
Bali	**Perseden**
Bali	PS Jembrana
West Nusa Tenggara	**Perslobar**
West Nusa Tenggara	PS Bima Sakti
East Nusa Tenggara

**Sulawesi**
Provincial league	Qualified teams
North Sulawesi	**Persmin**
Central Sulawesi	**Persipal**
South Sulawesi	**Gasma**
South Sulawesi	Alesha
Southeast Sulawesi	**Gasko**
Gorontalo	**Persidago**
Gorontalo	Panipi Raya
West Sulawesi	**PS Sandeq**

**Maluku**
Provincial league	Qualified teams
North Maluku	**Persihalsel**
(Maluku (province)) Maluku	**Maluku**

**Papua**
Provincial league	Qualified teams
(West Papua (province)) West Papua	**Perseman**
(Papua (province)) Papua	**Toli**
(Papua (province)) Papua	Persigubin

Notes:

- BOLD: Winner of each provincial league.
- Grey background denotes provinces that did not held province round.

== National round ==
A total of 64 teams competed in this round.

=== First round ===
In this first round, the 64 teams were divided into 16 groups. Each group played a home tournament basis. The first round was played from 6 February 2022. Winner and runner-up of each group advanced to the second round.

==== Group A ====
Five matches were held at the Benteng Stadium, Tangerang and one match was played at the PTIK Stadium, Jakarta.

Pos	Team	Pld	W	D	L	GF	GA	GD	Pts	Qualification	KOT	KSI	GAL	MAN
1	Persikota (H)	3	2	1	0	5	0	+5	7	Advanced to the second round	—	4–0	—	1–0
2	Persikasi	3	2	0	1	4	6	−2	6	Advanced to the second round	—	—	—	3–2
3	Galacticos Bireuen	3	1	1	1	2	2	0	4		0–0	0–1	—	—
4	Perseman	3	0	0	3	3	6	−3	0		—	—	1–2	—

Source: PSSI
(H) Hosts

==== Group B ====
Five matches were held at the Benteng Stadium, Tangerang and one match was played at the PTIK Stadium, Jakarta.

Pos	Team	Pld	W	D	L	GF	GA	GD	Pts	Qualification	BEL	SID	PLB	PRA
1	Belitong	3	3	0	0	9	0	+9	9	Advanced to the second round	—	2–0	1–0	—
2	Persida	3	1	1	1	11	4	+7	4	Advanced to the second round	—	—	1–1	—
3	Perslobar	3	1	1	1	5	5	0	4		—	—	—	4–3
4	Panipi Raya	3	0	0	3	4	20	−16	0		0–6	1–10	—	—

Source: PSSI

==== Group C ====
Five matches were held at the Jalak Harupat Stadium, Bandung Regency and one match was played at the Gelora Bandung Lautan Api Stadium, Bandung.

Pos	Team	Pld	W	D	L	GF	GA	GD	Pts	Qualification	KRU	KAB	ASI	KRJ
1	Karo United	3	3	0	0	8	2	+6	9	Advanced to the second round	—	—	—	1–0
2	Persikab (H)	3	2	0	1	9	3	+6	6	Advanced to the second round	0–2	—	—	5–0
3	ASIOP	3	1	0	2	5	10	−5	3		0–5	1–4	—	—
4	757 Kepri Jaya	3	0	0	3	1	8	−7	0		—	—	1–2	—

Source: PSSI
(H) Hosts

==== Group D ====
Five matches were held at the Jalak Harupat Stadium, Bandung Regency and one match was played at the Gelora Bandung Lautan Api Stadium, Bandung.

Pos	Team	Pld	W	D	L	GF	GA	GD	Pts	Qualification	PDT	KTM	GLK	BHB
1	Putra Delta Sidoarjo	3	2	1	0	12	4	+8	7	Advanced to the second round	—	—	—	6–1
2	Persikutim	3	2	1	0	9	3	+6	7	Advanced to the second round	2–2	—	—	5–0
3	Gasliko	3	1	0	2	4	6	−2	3		1–4	1–2	—	—
4	Benteng HB	3	0	0	3	1	13	−12	0		—	—	2–0	—

Source: PSSI

==== Group E ====
Five matches were held at the Galuh Stadium, Ciamis and one match was played at the Gelora Banjar Patroman Stadium, Banjar.

Pos	Team	Pld	W	D	L	GF	GA	GD	Pts	Qualification	PGC	BTL	PAL	GBS
1	PSGC (H)	3	3	0	0	5	1	+4	9	Advanced to the second round	—	2–1	2–0	—
2	Batulicin Putra 69	3	2	0	1	6	4	+2	6	Advanced to the second round	—	—	1–0	—
3	Persipal	3	1	0	2	4	3	+1	3		—	—	—	4–0
4	Gabsis	3	0	0	3	2	9	−7	0		0–1	2–4	—	—

Source: PSSI
(H) Hosts

==== Group F ====
Five matches were held at the Galuh Stadium, Ciamis and one match was played at the Gelora Banjar Patroman Stadium, Banjar.

Pos	Team	Pld	W	D	L	GF	GA	GD	Pts	Qualification	MTU	CTR	SAM	SDQ
1	Mataram Utama	3	2	1	0	10	2	+8	7	Advanced to the second round	—	2–0	—	2–2
2	Citeureup Raya	3	1	1	1	6	6	0	4	Advanced to the second round	—	—	—	2–2
3	Persisam United	3	1	0	2	7	11	−4	3		0–6	2–4	—	—
4	PS Sandeq	3	0	2	1	5	9	−4	2		—	—	1–5	—

Source: PSSI

==== Group G ====
Five matches were held at the Kebondalem Stadium, Kendal Regency and one match was played at the Moh Sarengat Stadium, Batang.

Pos	Team	Pld	W	D	L	GF	GA	GD	Pts	Qualification	PPA	GKO	BKA	UMS
1	Persipa (H)	3	2	0	1	11	2	+9	6	Advanced to the second round	—	1–2	—	3–0
2	Gasko	3	2	0	1	5	3	+2	6	Advanced to the second round	—	—	1–2	—
3	PS Bangka Setara	3	2	0	1	4	8	−4	6		0–7	—	—	2–0
4	UMS 1905	3	0	0	3	0	7	−7	0		—	0–2	—	—

Source: PSSI
(H) Hosts

==== Group H ====
Five matches were held at the Kebondalem Stadium, Kendal Regency and one match was played at the Moh Sarengat Stadium, Batang.

Pos	Team	Pld	W	D	L	GF	GA	GD	Pts	Qualification	PLM	KBM	PKB	JMB
1	PS Palembang	3	3	0	0	4	1	+3	9	Advanced to the second round	—	1–0	1–0	—
2	Persak	3	2	0	1	6	2	+4	6	Advanced to the second round	—	—	2–1	—
3	PSKB	3	1	0	2	3	3	0	3		—	—	—	2–0
4	PS Jembrana	3	0	0	3	1	8	−7	0		1–2	0–4	—	—

Source: PSSI

==== Group I ====
Five matches were held at the Gelora Joko Samudro Stadium, Gresik Regency and one match was played at the Semen Gresik Stadium, Gresik Regency.

Pos	Team	Pld	W	D	L	GF	GA	GD	Pts	Qualification	GRU	PDN	MAR	ALE
1	Gresik United (H)	3	3	0	0	4	1	+3	9	Advanced to the second round	—	—	1–0	1–0
2	Perseden	3	2	0	1	8	3	+5	6	Advanced to the second round	1–2	—	—	3–0
3	Persemar	3	1	0	2	4	7	−3	3		—	1–4	—	—
4	Alesha	3	0	0	3	2	7	−5	0		—	—	2–3	—

Source: PSSI
(H) Hosts

==== Group J ====
Five matches were held at the Gelora Joko Samudro Stadium, Gresik Regency and one match was played at the Semen Gresik Stadium, Gresik Regency.

Pos	Team	Pld	W	D	L	GF	GA	GD	Pts	Qualification	PCB	SIA	ADS	SLU
1	PCB Persipasi	3	1	2	0	9	5	+4	5	Advanced to the second round	—	—	3–3	—
2	PS Siak	3	1	2	0	2	1	+1	5	Advanced to the second round	1–1	—	0–0	—
3	AD Sport	3	0	3	0	4	4	0	3		—	—	—	1–1
4	Sleman United	3	0	1	2	2	7	−5	1		1–5	0–1	—	—

Source: PSSI

==== Group K ====
Five matches were held at the Gelora Delta Stadium, Sidoarjo Regency and one match was played at the Jenggolo Stadium, Sidoarjo Regency.

Pos	Team	Pld	W	D	L	GF	GA	GD	Pts	Qualification	DLT	JBU	MIN	TOR
1	Deltras (H)	3	2	1	0	3	0	+3	7	Advanced to the second round	—	—	2–0	1–0
2	Jambi United	3	1	2	0	2	1	+1	5	Advanced to the second round	0–0	—	—	2–1
3	Persmin	3	1	1	1	4	3	+1	4		—	0–0	—	—
4	Tornado	3	0	0	3	2	7	−5	0		—	—	1–4	—

Source: PSSI
(H) Hosts

==== Group L ====
Five matches were held at the Gelora Delta Stadium, Sidoarjo Regency and one match was played at the Jenggolo Stadium, Sidoarjo Regency.

Pos	Team	Pld	W	D	L	GF	GA	GD	Pts	Qualification	GSM	DGO	BMS	PLS
1	Gasma	3	1	2	0	4	3	+1	5	Advanced to the second round	—	—	2–1	—
2	Persidago	3	1	2	0	2	1	+1	5	Advanced to the second round	0–0	—	—	1–0
3	PS Bima Sakti	3	0	2	1	3	4	−1	2		—	1–1	—	1–1
4	PSLS	3	0	2	1	3	4	−1	2		2–2	—	—	—

Source: PSSI

==== Group M ====
Five matches were held at the Brawijaya Stadium, Kediri and one match was played at the Canda Bhirawa Stadium, Kediri Regency.

Pos	Team	Pld	W	D	L	GF	GA	GD	Pts	Qualification	DKB	BDU	HSL	YOB
1	Persedikab (H)	3	2	0	1	7	5	+2	6	Advanced to the second round	—	—	3–1	2–1
2	Bandung United	3	1	2	0	6	5	+1	5	Advanced to the second round	3–2	—	—	3–3
3	Persihalsel	3	1	1	1	3	4	−1	4		—	0–0	—	—
4	YOB Belawan	3	0	1	2	5	7	−2	1		—	—	1–2	—

Source: PSSI
(H) Hosts

==== Group N ====
Five matches were held at the Brawijaya Stadium, Kediri and one match was played at the Canda Bhirawa Stadium, Kediri Regency.

Pos	Team	Pld	W	D	L	GF	GA	GD	Pts	Qualification	BOY	PBL	TOL	PWG
1	Persebi	3	2	1	0	10	3	+7	7	Advanced to the second round	—	1–1	—	7–2
2	PSBL	3	1	2	0	2	1	+1	5	Advanced to the second round	—	—	0–0	1–0
3	Toli	3	1	1	1	4	2	+2	4		0–2	—	—	—
4	Persewangi	3	0	0	3	2	12	−10	0		—	—	0–4	—

Source: PSSI

==== Group O ====
Four matches were held at the Gajayana Stadium, Malang and the rest were held at the Jenderal Sudirman Yon Zipur 5 Field and Yonif Para Raider 502/Ujwala Yudha Field, Malang Regency.

Pos	Team	Pld	W	D	L	GF	GA	GD	Pts	Qualification	FML	SPC	NZR	BTV
1	Farmel	3	2	1	0	6	1	+5	7	Advanced to the second round	—	3–0	1–1	—
2	Serpong City	3	2	0	1	4	3	+1	6	Advanced to the second round	—	—	—	1–0
3	NZR Sumbersari (H)	3	0	2	1	4	7	−3	2		—	0–3	—	3–3
4	Batavia	3	0	1	2	3	6	−3	1		0–2	—	—	—

Source: PSSI
(H) Hosts

==== Group P ====
Four matches were held at the Gajayana Stadium, Malang and the rest were held at the Brigif Para Raider 18/Trisula Field and Yonif Para Raider 502/Ujwala Yudha Field, Malang Regency.

Pos	Team	Pld	W	D	L	GF	GA	GD	Pts	Qualification	PDS	MAL	NGA	GBN
1	PSDS	3	2	1	0	9	2	+7	7	Advanced to the second round	—	—	—	4–1
2	Maluku	3	1	2	0	5	2	+3	5	Advanced to the second round	1–1	—	1–1	—
3	Persinga	3	0	2	1	2	6	−4	2		0–4	—	—	—
4	Persigubin	3	0	1	2	2	8	−6	1		—	0–3	1–1	—

Source: PSSI

=== Second round ===
In this second round, 32 teams divided into eight groups. Each group played a home tournament basis. Second round were played from 16 February 2022. Winner and runner-up of each group advanced to the third round.

==== Group Q ====
Five matches were held at the Benteng Stadium, Tangerang and one match was played at the PTIK Stadium, Jakarta.

Pos	Team	Pld	W	D	L	GF	GA	GD	Pts	Qualification	KAB	KOT	BEL	KTM
1	Persikab	3	2	1	0	5	1	+4	7	Advanced to the third round	—	0–0	—	3–0
2	Persikota	3	1	2	0	1	0	+1	5	Advanced to the third round	—	—	0–0	1–0
3	Belitong	3	0	2	1	4	5	−1	2		1–2	—	—	—
4	Persikutim	3	0	1	2	3	7	−4	1		—	—	3–3	—

Source: PSSI

==== Group R ====
Five matches were held at the Jalak Harupat Stadium, Bandung Regency and one match was played at the Gelora Bandung Lautan Api Stadium, Bandung.

Pos	Team	Pld	W	D	L	GF	GA	GD	Pts	Qualification	PDT	KRU	SID	KSI
1	Putra Delta Sidoarjo	3	2	1	0	8	3	+5	7	Advanced to the third round	—	—	—	3–1
2	Karo United	3	2	1	0	5	2	+3	7	Advanced to the third round	1–1	—	1–0	—
3	Persida	3	1	0	2	4	6	−2	3		1–4	—	—	—
4	Persikasi	3	0	0	3	3	9	−6	0		—	1–3	1–3	—

Source: PSSI

==== Group S ====
Five matches were held at the Galuh Stadium, Ciamis and one match was played at the Gelora Banjar Patroman Stadium, Banjar.

Pos	Team	Pld	W	D	L	GF	GA	GD	Pts	Qualification	PGC	MTU	KBM	GKO
1	PSGC	3	3	0	0	6	3	+3	9	Advanced to the third round	—	2–1	1–0	—
2	Mataram Utama	3	2	0	1	6	4	+2	6	Advanced to the third round	—	—	—	3–1
3	Persak	3	1	0	2	4	4	0	3		—	1–2	—	—
4	Gasko	3	0	0	3	4	9	−5	0		2–3	—	1–3	—

Source: PSSI

==== Group T ====
Five matches were held at the Kebondalem Stadium, Kendal Regency and one match was played at the Moh Sarengat Stadium, Batang.

Pos	Team	Pld	W	D	L	GF	GA	GD	Pts	Qualification	PLM	PPA	BTL	CTR
1	PS Palembang	3	2	1	0	5	0	+5	7	Advanced to the third round	—	—	4–0	—
2	Persipa	3	2	0	1	6	2	+4	6	Advanced to the third round	0–1	—	—	4–0
3	Batulicin Putra 69	3	1	0	2	7	8	−1	3		—	1–2	—	6–2
4	Citeureup Raya	3	0	1	2	2	10	−8	1		0–0	—	—	—

Source: PSSI

==== Group U ====
Five matches were held at the Gelora Joko Samudro Stadium, Gresik Regency and one match was played at the Semen Gresik Stadium, Gresik Regency.

Pos	Team	Pld	W	D	L	GF	GA	GD	Pts	Qualification	DGO	GRU	PCB	JBU
1	Persidago	3	2	1	0	5	3	+2	7	Advanced to the third round	—	—	2–1	—
2	Gresik United	3	2	0	1	4	2	+2	6	Advanced to the third round	0–1	—	2–1	—
3	PCB Persipasi	3	1	0	2	5	5	0	3		—	—	—	3–1
4	Jambi United	3	0	1	2	3	7	−4	1		2–2	0–2	—	—

Source: PSSI

==== Group V ====
Five matches were held at the Gelora Delta Stadium, Sidoarjo Regency and one match was played at the Jenggolo Stadium, Sidoarjo Regency.

Pos	Team	Pld	W	D	L	GF	GA	GD	Pts	Qualification	DLT	SIA	PDN	GSM
1	Deltras	3	2	1	0	6	1	+5	7	Advanced to the third round	—	1–0	—	4–0
2	PS Siak	3	2	0	1	7	2	+5	6	Advanced to the third round	—	—	—	3–1
3	Perseden	3	0	2	1	2	6	−4	2		1–1	0–4	—	—
4	Gasma	3	0	1	2	2	8	−6	1		—	—	1–1	—

Source: PSSI

==== Group W ====
Five matches were held at the Brawijaya Stadium, Kediri and one match was played at the Canda Bhirawa Stadium, Kediri Regency.

Pos	Team	Pld	W	D	L	GF	GA	GD	Pts	Qualification	SPC	DKB	BOY	MAL
1	Serpong City	3	2	1	0	4	1	+3	7	Advanced to the third round	—	1–1	—	1–0
2	Persedikab	3	2	1	0	6	4	+2	7	Advanced to the third round	—	—	2–1	3–2
3	Persebi	3	1	0	2	4	6	−2	3		0–2	—	—	—
4	Maluku	3	0	0	3	4	7	−3	0		—	—	2–3	—

Source: PSSI

==== Group X ====
Five matches were held at the Jala Krida AAL Stadium, Surabaya and one match was played at the Jenggolo Stadium, Sidoarjo Regency.

Pos	Team	Pld	W	D	L	GF	GA	GD	Pts	Qualification	FML	PDS	BDU	PBL
1	Farmel	3	2	1	0	7	1	+6	7	Advanced to the third round	—	0–0	—	4–1
2	PSDS	3	1	2	0	4	0	+4	5	Advanced to the third round	—	—	0–0	—
3	Bandung United	3	1	1	1	4	4	0	4		0–3	—	—	4–1
4	PSBL	3	0	0	3	2	12	−10	0		—	0–4	—	—

Source: PSSI

=== Third round ===
In this third round, 16 teams were divided into four groups. Each group was played on a home tournament basis. Third round were played from 6 March 2022 which were held at the Gelora Joko Samudro Stadium, Gresik Regency and Gelora Delta Stadium, Sidoarjo Regency. Winner and runner-up of each group promoted to Liga 2. Winner of each group also advanced to the semi-finals.

==== Group AA ====
Pos	Team	Pld	W	D	L	GF	GA	GD	Pts	Qualification	PDS	DLT	DKB	PLM
1	PSDS (P)	3	2	1	0	6	1	+5	7	Promoted to the Liga 2 and advanced to the semi-finals	—	1–0	—	4–0
2	Deltras (P)	3	2	0	1	3	2	+1	6	Promoted to the Liga 2	—	—	2–1	1–0
3	Persedikab	3	0	2	1	5	6	−1	2		1–1	—	—	—
4	PS Palembang	3	0	1	2	3	8	−5	1		—	—	3–3	—

Source: PSSI
(P) Promoted

==== Group BB ====
Pos	Team	Pld	W	D	L	GF	GA	GD	Pts	Qualification	KRU	KAB	SPC	SIA
1	Karo United (P)	3	2	1	0	6	2	+4	7	Promoted to the Liga 2 and advanced to the semi-finals	—	2–1	0–0	—
2	Persikab (P)	3	2	0	1	6	2	+4	6	Promoted to the Liga 2	—	—	—	4–0
3	Serpong City	3	1	1	1	4	2	+2	4		—	0–1	—	—
4	PS Siak	3	0	0	3	2	12	−10	0		1–4	—	1–4	—

Source: PSSI
(P) Promoted

==== Group CC ====
Pos	Team	Pld	W	D	L	GF	GA	GD	Pts	Qualification	PDT	PPA	FML	KOT
1	Putra Delta Sidoarjo (P)	3	2	1	0	6	3	+3	7	Promoted to the Liga 2 and advanced to the semi-finals	—	1–1	2–1	—
2	Persipa (P)	3	1	1	1	9	7	+2	4	Promoted to the Liga 2	—	—	6–3	—
3	Farmel	3	1	0	2	7	8	−1	3		—	—	—	3–0 (Note: The match between Farmel and Persikota was stopped in 63rd minute due to dissatisfaction to referee when Farmel was leading 3–0.)
4	Persikota (Note: Persikota were deducted three points by the PSSI Disciplinary Committee as punishment for not continuing the match against Farmel on 6 March 2022.)	3	1	0	2	4	8	−4	0		1–3	3–2	—	—

Source: PSSI
(P) Promoted

==== Group DD ====
Pos	Team	Pld	W	D	L	GF	GA	GD	Pts	Qualification	MTU	GRU	PGC	DGO
1	Mataram Utama (P)	3	1	2	0	6	3	+3	5	Promoted to the Liga 2 and advanced to the semi-finals	—	1–1	—	—
2	Gresik United (P)	3	1	2	0	4	1	+3	5	Promoted to the Liga 2	—	—	—	0–0
3	PSGC	3	0	2	1	2	5	−3	2		1–1	0–3	—	—
4	Persidago	3	0	2	1	2	5	−3	2		1–4	—	1–1	—

Source: PSSI
(P) Promoted

=== Knockout stage ===
All times listed below are UTC+7.

Semi-finals
26 March 2022 – Sidoarjo Regency
PSDS	0
Karo United	2
27 March 2022 – Sidoarjo Regency
Putra Delta Sidoarjo	6
Mataram Utama	1

Final
30 March 2022 – Sidoarjo Regency
Karo United	3 (4)
Putra Delta Sidoarjo	3 (2)

==== Semi-finals ====
26 March 2022
14:00

PSDS	0–2	Karo United
	Report	Tarigan 54' (pen.); Agung 67'

Gelora Delta Stadium, Sidoarjo Regency
27 March 2022
14:00

Putra Delta Sidoarjo	6–1	Mataram Utama
Aldy 5'; Adam 24', 70', 90'; Ferry 31'; Wisal 65'	Report	Ridhwan 45'

Gelora Delta Stadium, Sidoarjo Regency

==== Final ====
30 March 2022
14:00

Karo United	3–3	Putra Delta Sidoarjo
Tarigan 15' (pen.); Faisal 20'; Agung 40'	Report	Adam 9'; Yoga 45'; Fajrul 88'
Penalties
Aidun (penalty scored); Faisal (penalty scored); Riyan (penalty scored); Aditiya (penalty scored)	4–2	(penalty scored) Adam; (penalty missed) Burji; (penalty scored) Fega; (penalty missed) Shadiq

Gelora Delta Stadium, Sidoarjo Regency

== Top goalscorers ==
Rank	Player	Team	Goals
1	(Indonesia) Mochamad Adam Malik	Putra Delta Sidoarjo	11
2	(Indonesia) Kardinata Tarigan	Karo United	9
2	(Indonesia) Sehabudin Ahmad	Farmel	9
3	(Indonesia) Dwiki Mardiyanto	Persikab	8
5	(Indonesia) Mohammad Khanafi	Persedikab	7

== See also ==
- 2021–22 Liga 1
- 2021–22 Liga 2
