= Ardhiansah Pramesthu =

Indonesian footballer

Personal information
- Full name: Ardhiansah Pramesthu
- Date of birth: July 21, 2002 (age 24)
- Place of birth: Bantul, Indonesia
- Height: 1.72 m (5 ft 8 in)
- Position: Attacking midfielder

Youth career
- 2017: Askab Bantul
- 2018: Baturetno FC
- 2019: Nur Iman FC
- 2019: PSS Sleman
- 2020: Barito Putera

Senior career*
Years	Team	Apps	(Gls)
2021	Barito Putera	2	(0)
2023–2025	Persiba Bantul	25	(5)
- * Club domestic league appearances and goals as of 18 January 2025

Ardhiansah Pramesthu (born July 21, 2002) is an Indonesian professional footballer who plays as an attacking midfielder.

== Club career ==
=== Barito Putera ===
He was signed for Barito Putera to play in Liga 1 in the 2021 season. Ardhiansah made his professional debut on 20 October 2021 in a match against PSIS Semarang at the Sultan Agung Stadium, Bantul.

== Career statistics ==
=== Club ===
As of 23 November 2021.

Club	Season	League			Cup		Continental		Other		Total	
Club	Season	Division	Apps	Goals	Apps	Goals	Apps	Goals	Apps	Goals	Apps	Goals
Barito Putera	2021	Liga 1	2	0	0	0	–		0	0	2	0
Career total			2	0	0	0	0	0	0	0	2	0
