= 2021 Liga 3 Gorontalo =

Tournament details
- Dates: 28 September 2021-January 2022
- Teams: 24

Final positions
- Champions: Persidago Gorontalo (4th title)
- Runners-up: Panipi Raya

The 2021 Liga 3 Gorontalo will be the fourth season of Liga 3 Gorontalo as a qualifying round for the national round of the 2021–22 Liga 3.

Persidago Gorontalo were the defending champion.

== Teams ==
There are 24 teams participated in the league this season.

- Abdi United
- Basmi
- Boliyohuto
- Bonebol
- Dulamayo
- Dulupi
- FC Gorut
- IPPOT Bolango
- Kreasindo
- Lakeya
- Likot
- Mahardika
- Muara Tirta
- Paguyaman All Star
- Paguyaman Pantai All Star
- Panipi Raya
- Panua GFC
- Persidago Gorontalo
- Persital
- PS Boalemo
- PSP Pohuwato
- Rajawali Gorontalo
- Sparadis United
- Telaga Biru

== Group stages ==
=== Group A ===
Pos	Team	Pld	W	D	L	GF	GA	GD	Pts	Qualification
1	Panipi Raya	11	10	0	1	46	24	+22	30	Advanced to Second round
2	Persidago Gorontalo	11	9	2	0	60	6	+54	29	Advanced to Second round
3	Rajawali Gorontalo	11	9	1	1	30	14	+16	28	Advanced to Second round
4	Abdi United	11	5	1	5	28	27	+1	16	Advanced to Second round
5	IPPOT Bolango	11	5	1	5	23	26	−3	16	Advanced to Second round
6	Telaga Biru	11	4	3	4	30	23	+7	15	Advanced to Second round
7	Persital Talumolo	11	5	0	6	24	26	−2	15	Advanced to Second round
8	Kreasindo	11	4	3	4	21	28	−7	15	Advanced to Second round
9	Bonebol	11	3	2	6	22	25	−3	11	
10	Dulamayo	11	2	2	7	20	40	−20	8	
11	Boliyohuto	11	0	3	8	8	41	−33	3	Relegated to 2022 Liga 3 Gorontalo B
12	Likot	11	0	2	9	15	47	−32	2	Relegated to 2022 Liga 3 Gorontalo B

Updated to match(es) played on 4 December 2021. Source: Liga 3 Gorontalo 2021

=== Group B ===
Pos	Team	Pld	W	D	L	GF	GA	GD	Pts	Qualification
1	PS Boalemo	11	9	2	0	42	9	+33	29	Advanced to Second round
2	PSP Pohuwato	11	7	4	0	37	14	+23	25	Advanced to Second round
3	Muara Tirta	11	7	3	1	25	10	+15	24	Advanced to Second round
4	FC Gorut	11	6	1	4	24	18	+6	19	Advanced to Second round
5	Mahardhika	11	5	2	4	25	13	+12	17	Advanced to Second round
6	Panua GFC	11	4	4	3	20	16	+4	16	Advanced to Second round
7	Basmi	11	3	4	4	18	24	−6	13	Advanced to Second round
8	Lakeya	11	3	3	5	20	19	+1	12	Advanced to Second round
9	Dulupi	11	3	3	5	23	21	+2	12	
10	Sparadis United	11	2	1	8	15	39	−24	7	
11	Paguyaman Pantai All Star	11	1	3	7	13	40	−27	6	Relegated to 2022 Liga 3 Gorontalo B
12	Paguyaman All Star	11	1	0	10	11	50	−39	3	Relegated to 2022 Liga 3 Gorontalo B

Updated to match(es) played on 6 December 2021. Source: Liga 3 Gorontalo 2021

== Second round ==
19 December 2021
14.30 UTC+8

Panipi Raya	5–0	Lakeya

23 January Stadium, Gorontalo

20 December 2021
14.30 UTC+8

PS Boalemo	1–1 (4–2)	Abdi United

23 January Stadium, Gorontalo

21 December 2021
14.30 UTC+8

PSP Pohuwato	4–0	Telaga Biru

23 January Stadium, Gorontalo

22 December 2021
14.30 UTC+8

Persidago Gorontalo	6–0	Basmi

23 January Stadium, Gorontalo

23 December 2021
14.30 UTC+8

Rajawali Gorontalo	5–1	Panua GFC

23 January Stadium, Gorontalo

24 December 2021
14.30 UTC+8

Muara Tirta	3–2	Persital Talumolo

23 January Stadium, Gorontalo

25 December 2021
14.30 UTC+8

FC Gorut	2—1	IPPOT Bolango

23 January Stadium, Gorontalo

26 December 2021
14.30 UTC+8

Kreasindo	0—1	Mahardhika

23 January Stadium, Gorontalo

== Third round ==
=== Group C ===
Pos	Team	Pld	W	D	L	GF	GA	GD	Pts	Qualification
1	Panipi Raya	3	2	1	0	9	3	+6	7	Advanced to Final and Qualified to National round
2	Rajawali Gorontalo	3	2	1	0	6	2	+4	7	
3	PSP Pohuwato	2	0	0	2	2	6	−4	0	
4	FC Gorut	2	0	0	2	1	7	−6	0	

Updated to match(es) played on 7 January 2022. Source:

=== Group D ===
Pos	Team	Pld	W	D	L	GF	GA	GD	Pts	Qualification
1	Persidago Gorontalo	3	3	0	0	16	2	+14	9	Advanced to Final and Qualified to National round
2	Muara Tirta	3	2	0	1	7	8	−1	6	
3	PS Boalemo	3	1	0	2	7	5	+2	3	
4	Mahardhika	3	0	0	3	2	17	−15	0	

Updated to match(es) played on 8 January 2022. Source:

== Final ==
January 11, 2022
14.30 UTC+8

Panipi Raya	2–3	Persidago Gorontalo

23 January Telaga Stadium, Gorontalo
