= Arie Sandy =

Indonesian footballer

Personal information
- Full name: Arie Sandy
- Date of birth: 1 June 1997 (age 29)
- Place of birth: Makassar, Indonesia
- Height: 1.68 m (5 ft 6 in)
- Positions: Defensive midfielder; defender

Youth career
- –2016: Barito Putera

Senior career*
| Years | Team | Apps | (Gls) |
| 2016 | Barito Putera | 11 | (0) |
| 2017–2019 | PSS Sleman | 37 | (2) |
- * Club domestic league appearances and goals as of 17 Juni 2018

Arie Sandy (born January 6, 1997), is an Indonesian professional footballer who plays as defensive midfielder, he can also operate as a defender.

== Club career ==
=== Barito Putera ===
Arie joined the squad for the event Indonesia Soccer Championship. Arie made his debut when facing against Persipura Jayapura on the sixth week Indonesia Soccer Championship A 2016.

== Honours ==
=== Club ===
PSS Sleman

- Liga 2: 2018
