= 2016 Soeratin Cup =

Piala Soeratin
- Season: 2016
- Dates: 19 November - 10 December

The 2016 Soeratin Cup season is a football competition which is intended for footballers born before 1 January 1999. This season is managed by competition committee of Province Association for qualification round and managed by PT. GTS in national round. The national round started on 19 November 2016.

== Format ==
Each Provincial Association only given one representative to the national round. 30 teams will perform in the final round, consist of 30 teams of provincial competition winners. National round took place in Central Java and Special Region of Yogyakarta.

== Teams ==
Each Provincial Association only given one representative to the national round. Jakarta, West Kalimantan, West Papua, and Papua did not send its representative.

=== Sumatra Region ===
#	Province	Teams
1	Aceh	PSAP Junior
2	North Sumatra	PSDS Deli Serdang
3	West Sumatra	Persiju Sijunjung
4	Riau	PS Duri
5	Riau Islands	PS Batam
6	Jambi	Persibri Batanghari
7	Bangka-Belitung	PS South Bangka
8	South Sumatra	PS East OKU
9	Bengkulu	PS Bengkulu
10	Lampung	PS Tanggamus

=== Java Region ===
#	Province	Teams
1	Banten	Cilegon United F.C.
2	Jakarta	Did not participate
3	West Java	Persib Bandung
4	Central Java	Persab Brebes
5	Yogyakarta	PSIM Yogyakarta
6	East Java	Persida Sidoarjo

=== Kalimantan Region ===
#	Province	Teams
1	South Kalimantan	Peseban Banjarmasin
2	West Kalimantan	Did not participate
3	Central Kalimantan	Green Ranger F.C.
4	East Kalimantan	Association City of Balikpapan (Askot Balikpapan)
5	North Kalimantan	PSN Nunukan

=== Sulawesi Region ===
#	Province	Teams
1	North Sulawesi	Persbit Bitung
2	South Sulawesi	District Association of Gowa (Askab Gowa)
3	Central Sulawesi	Bandar Sulteng F.C.
4	West Sulawesi	PS Polmas
5	Southeast Sulawesi	Sultra Selection U-17
6	Gorontalo	Gorontalo

=== Bali and Nusa Tenggara Region ===
#	Province	Teams
1	Bali	Putra Tresna F.C.
2	East Nusa Tenggara	Persesba West Sumba
3	West Nusa Tenggara	Persisum Sumbawa

=== Maluku and Papua Region ===
#	Province	Teams
1	Maluku	Persita Laha
2	North Maluku	Persihaltim East Halmahera
3	West Papua	Did not participate
4	Papua	Did not participate

== National Round ==
National round will take place in Central Java and Special Region of Yogyakarta.

=== Group stage ===
30 teams from each provincial association will compete. Matches for the Group stage will be played from 19–25 November 2016. All group will play half season round-robin.

==== Group A ====
This group will be held in Jenderal Hoegeng Stadium, Pekalongan and Moh Sarengat Stadium, Batang Regency.

Pos	Team	Pld	W	D	L	GF	GA	GD	Pts	Qualification or relegation
1	Persida Sidoarjo	0	0	0	0	0	0	0	0	Advance to Round of 16
2	Putra Tresna	0	0	0	0	0	0	0	0	Advance to Round of 16
3	PS East OKU	0	0	0	0	0	0	0	0	
4	PSDS Deli Serdang	0	0	0	0	0	0	0	0	

Updated to match(es) played on unknown. Source: ISC
Rules for classification: 1) points; 2) head-to-head; 3) goal difference; 4) number of goals scored.

Match 1

TBD	TBD	v	TBD	TBD
TBD

TBD	TBD	v	TBD	TBD
TBD

Match 2

TBD	TBD	v	TBD	TBD
TBD

TBD	TBD	v	TBD	TBD
TBD

Match 3

TBD	TBD	v	TBD	TBD
TBD

TBD	TBD	v	TBD	TBD
TBD

==== Group B ====
This group will be held in Jatidiri Stadium, Semarang and Citarum Stadium, Semarang.

Pos	Team	Pld	W	D	L	GF	GA	GD	Pts	Qualification or relegation
1	Sultra Selection	0	0	0	0	0	0	0	0	Advance to Round of 16
2	Persib Bandung	0	0	0	0	0	0	0	0	Advance to Round of 16
3	Persbit Bitung	0	0	0	0	0	0	0	0	

Updated to match(es) played on unknown. Source: ISC
Rules for classification: 1) points; 2) head-to-head; 3) goal difference; 4) number of goals scored.

Match 1

TBD	TBD	v	TBD	TBD
TBD

Match 2

TBD	TBD	v	TBD	TBD
TBD

Match 3

TBD	TBD	v	TBD	TBD
TBD

==== Group C ====
This group will be held in Pandanaran Stadium, Ungaran.

Pos	Team	Pld	W	D	L	GF	GA	GD	Pts	Qualification or relegation
1	Persihaltim East Halmahera	0	0	0	0	0	0	0	0	Advance to Round of 16
2	PSAP Junior	0	0	0	0	0	0	0	0	Advance to Round of 16
3	Persisum Sumbawa	0	0	0	0	0	0	0	0	
4	PS Duri	0	0	0	0	0	0	0	0	

Updated to match(es) played on unknown. Source: ISC
Rules for classification: 1) points; 2) head-to-head; 3) goal difference; 4) number of goals scored.

Match 1

TBD	TBD	v	TBD	TBD
TBD

TBD	TBD	v	TBD	TBD
TBD

Match 2

TBD	TBD	v	TBD	TBD
TBD

TBD	TBD	v	TBD	TBD
TBD

Match 3

TBD	TBD	v	TBD	TBD
TBD

TBD	TBD	v	TBD	TBD
TBD

==== Group D ====
This group will be held in Gelora Bumi Kartini Stadium, Jepara.

Pos	Team	Pld	W	D	L	GF	GA	GD	Pts	Qualification or relegation
1	Peseban Banjarmasin	0	0	0	0	0	0	0	0	Advance to Round of 16
2	Persiju Sijunjung	0	0	0	0	0	0	0	0	Advance to Round of 16
3	Cilegon United	0	0	0	0	0	0	0	0	
4	Askot Balikpapan	0	0	0	0	0	0	0	0	

Updated to match(es) played on unknown. Source: ISC
Rules for classification: 1) points; 2) head-to-head; 3) goal difference; 4) number of goals scored.

Match 1

TBD	TBD	v	TBD	TBD
TBD

TBD	TBD	v	TBD	TBD
TBD

Match 2

TBD	TBD	v	TBD	TBD
TBD

TBD	TBD	v	TBD	TBD
TBD

Match 3

TBD	TBD	v	TBD	TBD
TBD

TBD	TBD	v	TBD	TBD
TBD

==== Group E ====
This group will be held in Wergu Wetan Stadium, Kudus.

Pos	Team	Pld	W	D	L	GF	GA	GD	Pts	Qualification or relegation
1	PS Polmas	0	0	0	0	0	0	0	0	Advance to Round of 16
2	PS South Bangka	0	0	0	0	0	0	0	0	Advance to Round of 16
3	PSIM Yogyakarta	0	0	0	0	0	0	0	0	
4	PS Bengkulu	0	0	0	0	0	0	0	0	

Updated to match(es) played on unknown. Source: ISC
Rules for classification: 1) points; 2) head-to-head; 3) goal difference; 4) number of goals scored.

Match 1

TBD	TBD	v	TBD	TBD
TBD

TBD	TBD	v	TBD	TBD
TBD

Match 2

TBD	TBD	v	TBD	TBD
TBD

TBD	TBD	v	TBD	TBD
TBD

Match 3

TBD	TBD	v	TBD	TBD
TBD

TBD	TBD	v	TBD	TBD
TBD

==== Group F ====
This group will be held in Moch. Soebroto Stadium, Magelang and Gemilang Stadium, Magelang Regency.

Pos	Team	Pld	W	D	L	GF	GA	GD	Pts	Qualification or relegation
1	Askab Gowa	0	0	0	0	0	0	0	0	Advance to Round of 16
2	Gorontalo	0	0	0	0	0	0	0	0	Advance to Round of 16
3	PS Batam	0	0	0	0	0	0	0	0	

Updated to match(es) played on unknown. Source: ISC
Rules for classification: 1) points; 2) head-to-head; 3) goal difference; 4) number of goals scored.

Match 1

TBD	TBD	v	TBD	TBD
TBD

Match 2

TBD	TBD	v	TBD	TBD
TBD

Match 3

TBD	TBD	v	TBD	TBD
TBD

==== Group G ====
This group will be held in Sriwedari Stadium, Surakarta.

Pos	Team	Pld	W	D	L	GF	GA	GD	Pts	Qualification or relegation
1	Green Ranger	0	0	0	0	0	0	0	0	Advance to Round of 16
2	PS Tanggamus	0	0	0	0	0	0	0	0	Advance to Round of 16
3	Persibri Batanghari	0	0	0	0	0	0	0	0	
4	Persita Laha	0	0	0	0	0	0	0	0	

Updated to match(es) played on unknown. Source: ISC
Rules for classification: 1) points; 2) head-to-head; 3) goal difference; 4) number of goals scored.

Match 1

TBD	TBD	v	TBD	TBD
TBD

TBD	TBD	v	TBD	TBD
TBD

Match 2

TBD	TBD	v	TBD	TBD
TBD

TBD	TBD	v	TBD	TBD
TBD

Match 3

TBD	TBD	v	TBD	TBD
TBD

TBD	TBD	v	TBD	TBD
TBD

==== Group H ====
This group will be held in Sultan Agung Stadium, Bantul.

Pos	Team	Pld	W	D	L	GF	GA	GD	Pts	Qualification or relegation
1	Persab Brebes	0	0	0	0	0	0	0	0	Advance to Round of 16
2	PSN Nunukan	0	0	0	0	0	0	0	0	Advance to Round of 16
3	Persesba West Sumba	0	0	0	0	0	0	0	0	
4	Bandar Sulteng	0	0	0	0	0	0	0	0	

Updated to match(es) played on unknown. Source: ISC
Rules for classification: 1) points; 2) head-to-head; 3) goal difference; 4) number of goals scored.

Match 1

TBD	TBD	v	TBD	TBD
TBD

TBD	TBD	v	TBD	TBD
TBD

Match 2

TBD	TBD	v	TBD	TBD
TBD

TBD	TBD	v	TBD	TBD
TBD

Match 3

TBD	TBD	v	TBD	TBD
TBD

TBD	TBD	v	TBD	TBD
TBD

=== Knockout stage ===
==== Quarter-finals ====
Matches for Quarter-finals will be played at 3 December 2016.

3 December 2016	Putra Tresna	2–5	Askot Balikpapan	Bantul
15:30				Stadium: Sultan Agung Stadium

3 December 2016	Persib Bandung	3–0	Persihaltim	Bantul
19:00				Stadium: Sultan Agung Stadium

3 December 2016	PS Bangsel	0–1	PS Tanggamus	Kudus
15:30				Stadium: Wergu Wetan Stadium

3 December 2016	PSIM Yogyakarta	0–2	Persab Brebes	Kudus
19:00				Stadium: Wergu Wetan Stadium

==== Semi-finals ====
Matches for Semi-finals will be played at 7 December 2016.

7 December 2016	Askot Balikpapan	1–0	PS Tanggamus	Bantul
14:30				Stadium: Sultan Agung Stadium

7 December 2016	Persib Bandung	2–4	Persab Brebes	Bantul
19:00				Stadium: Sultan Agung Stadium

==== Third Place ====
Matches for Third Place Play-off will be played at 10 December 2016.

10 December 2016	PS Tanggamus	0–2	Persib Bandung	Surakarta
15:30				Stadium: Manahan Stadium

==== Final ====
Matches for Final were played on 10 December 2016.

10 December 2016	Askot Balikpapan	1–4	Persab Brebes	Surakarta
19:00				Stadium: Manahan Stadium

== Champions ==
Champions

Persab Brebes
1st title

== See also ==
- 2016 Indonesia Soccer Championship A
- 2016 Indonesia Soccer Championship B
- 2016 Indonesia Soccer Championship U-21
- 2016 Liga Nusantara
