= Indonesia Soccer Championship =

- Founded: 2016
- Folded: 2017
- Country: Indonesia
- Divisions: ISC A ISC B ISC Liga Nusantara; ISC U-21; ISC Soeratin U-17
- Number of clubs: 18 (ISC A)
- Level on pyramid: 1–3
- Broadcaster(s): SCTV; Indosiar
- Website: Official Site

Indonesia Soccer Championship (ISC; Indonesian: Kejuaraan Sepak Bola Indonesia), also known as Torabika Soccer Championship for sponsorship reasons, was a temporary professional football competition system in Indonesia, replacing the temporarily suspended Indonesia League. It only ran for a year in 2016.

== History ==
=== Origins ===
After the ISL was stopped and the management of PSSI under La Nyalla Mattalitti was frozen by Minister for Youth and Sports Affairs Imam Nahrawi on 17 April 2015, FIFA then froze the membership of PSSI, resulting in the suspension of the Indonesian Football Association. Tournaments were made to replace the competition, starting with the 2015 President's Cup (Indonesian: Piala Presiden) where Persib Bandung came out as champions, until the Bhayangkara Cup (Indonesian: Piala Bhayangkara) closed the tournaments ahead of ISC 2016. The 2015–16 season of the Indonesia Super League (ISL) was originally to start from either 24 or 25 of October 2015 and end in August 2016. However, various constraints faced thwarted the plan, including the use of the name "Indonesia Super League" which was the property of PSSI. Finally PT Liga and Indonesian football clubs agreed not to use the "ISL" name for the upcoming long-term tournaments.

=== Establishment ===
PT Gelora Trisula Semesta (GTS) held a meeting with all of the ex-ISL and Premier Division clubs on Friday, 26 February 2016, and agreed to form ISC 2016 that would contain 18 ex-ISL clubs and 59 from the Premier Division. The competition was approved by the government. Using the name Torabika Soccer Championship, ISC officially launched in Hotel Mulia in Senayan, Jakarta, on Monday, 18 April 2016.
