= Fathlul Rahman =

Indonesian footballer

Fatur Rahman
Personal information
- Full name: Fathlul Rahman
- Date of birth: 16 August 1984 (age 42)
- Place of birth: Makassar, Indonesia
- Height: 1.70 m (5 ft 7 in)
- Position: Left back

Senior career*
Years	Team	Apps	(Gls)
2006–2010	PSM Makassar	68	(0)
2010–2011	Mitra Kukar	16	(0)
2011–2012	Persela Lamongan	29	(1)
2012–2014	Barito Putera	51	(0)
2014–2016	Sriwijaya FC	13	(0)
2016–2017	Barito Putera	30	(0)
2017–2018	PSM Makassar	14	(0)
2018–2019	Persiba Balikpapan	20	(0)
2019	Borneo	3	(0)
2019–2020	Barito Putera	1	(0)

Managerial career
- 2021–2022: Alesha
- * Club domestic league appearances and goals as of 18 September 2019

Fathlul Rahman (born August 16, 1984) is an Indonesian professional football coach and former player.

== Club career statistics ==
As of 5 January 2013.

Club performance			League		Cup		League Cup		Total	
Season	Club	League	Apps	Goals	Apps	Goals	Apps	Goals	Apps	Goals
Indonesia			League		Piala Indonesia		League Cup		Total	
2007–08	PSM Makassar	Liga Indonesia	22	0	1	0	-		23	0
2008–09	PSM Makassar	Super League	12	0	1	0	-		13	0
2009–10	PSM Makassar	Super League	31	0	6	0	-		37	0
2010–11	Mitra Kukar	Premier Division	16	0	-		-		16	0
2011–12	Persela Lamongan	Super League	29	1	-		-		29	1
2013	Barito Putera	Super League	1	0	0	0	-		1	0
Total	Indonesia		111	1	8	0	-		119	1
Career total			111	1	8	0	-		119	1
