= Adrem (snacks) =

Indonesian traditional snacks

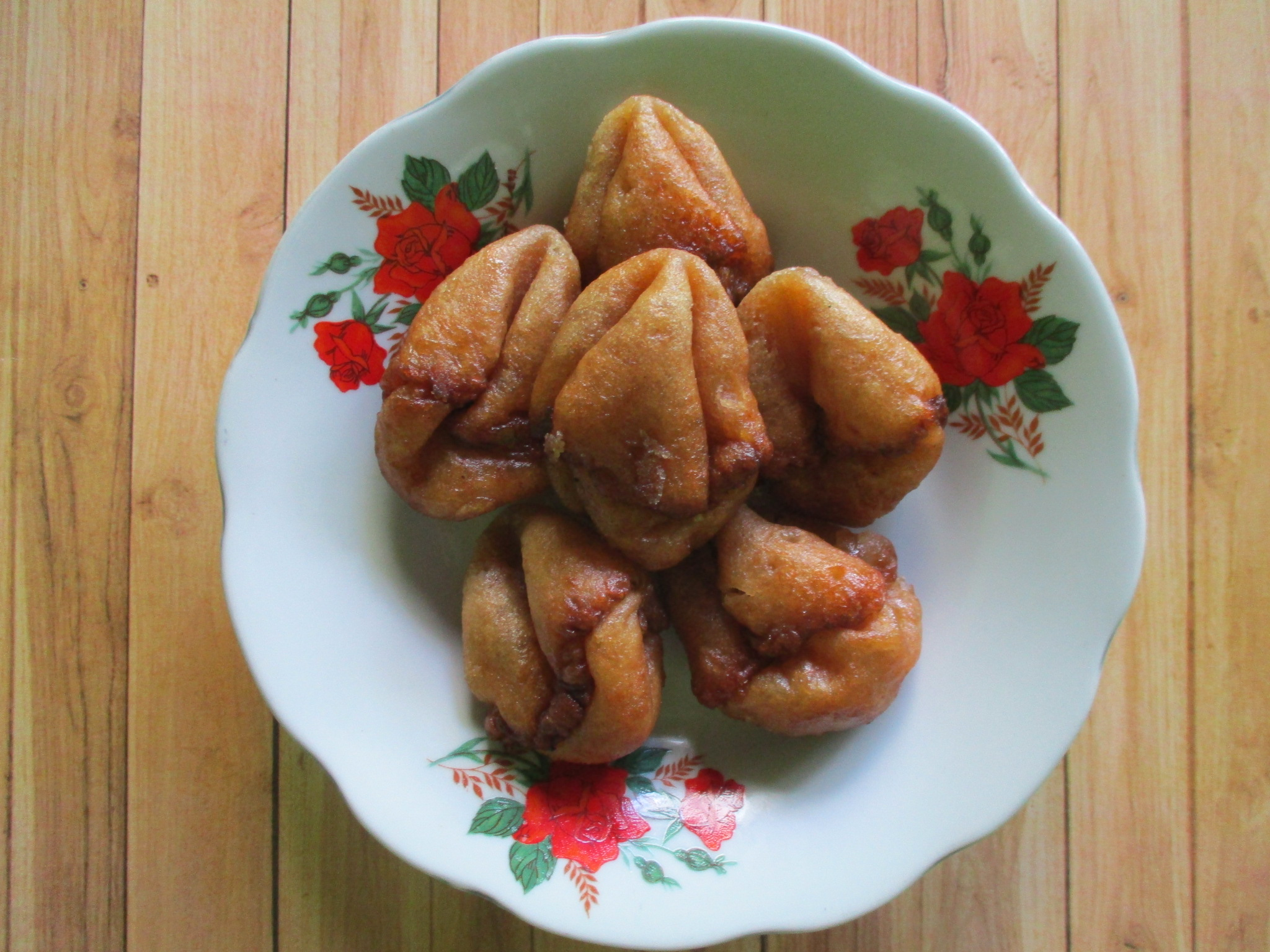
- Alternative names: Tholpit
- Type: Snack food
- Place of origin: Bantul, Indonesia
- Main ingredients: Rice flour, brown sugar

Adrem, also known as Tholpit, is a traditional Indonesian snack in Bantul made of fried rice flour and brown sugar. These snacks are produced in the Sanden area and can be found in traditional markets in Bantul and surrounding areas.

== Production ==
The main ingredients for making Adrem snacks are rice flour, grated coconut, and brown sugar. The mixture of grated rice flour and grated coconut is then mixed with brown sugar that has been melted, crushed, then fried into a round shape like a meatball. It is then flattened on a banana leaf. The unique shape of the Adrem snack is obtained during the frying process, due to its fixation with bamboo slats.
