= Persiwah Mempawah =

Indonesian football club in West Kalimantan

- Full name: Persatuan Sepakbola Indonesia Mempawah
- Nickname: Laskar Opu Daeng Manambon
- Ground: Opu Daeng Manambon Stadium; Mempawah, West Kalimantan
- Owner: Askab PSSI Mempawah
- Chairman: Ismayuda
- Manager: Suprihadi
- Coach: Muhammad Syafaruddin
- League: Liga 4
- 2025–26: 1st (West Kalimantan zone); First round, 4th in Group A (National phase)
Home colours	Away colours

Persatuan Sepakbola Indonesia Mempawah (simply known as Persiwah Mempawah) is an Indonesian football club based in Mempawah Regency, West Kalimantan. They currently compete in the Liga 4 and their homeground is Opu Daeng Manambon Stadium.

== Season-by-season records ==
Season(s)	League/Division	Tier	Tms.	Pos.	Piala Indonesia	AFC/AFF competition(s)	
2018							
2019	Liga 3	3	32	Eliminated in Provincial phase	–	–	–
2020	Liga 3	3	season abandoned		–	–	–
2021–22	Liga 3	3	64	Eliminated in Provincial phase	–	–	–
2022–23							
2023–24
2024–25
2025–26	Liga 4	4	64	TBD	–	–	–

== Honours ==
- Liga 4 West Kalimantan
  - Champions: 2025–26
