= Gasma Enrekang =

Indonesian football club

- Full name: Gabungan Sepakbola Massenrempulu Enrekang
- Nicknames: Laskar Gunung Nona; Laskar Puncak Celebes; Laskar Bukit Bawang; Laskar Massenrempulu
- Short name: Gasma
- Ground: Massenrempulu Stadium, Enrekang
- Capacity: 5,000
- Owner: Askab PSSI Enrekang
- Manager: Suherdi Eljalani
- Coach: Deni Tarkas
- League: Liga 4
- 2021–22: Liga 3, Round of 32 (National)
Home colours	Away colours

Gabungan Sepakbola Massenrempulu Enrekang or Gasma Enrekang is an Indonesian football team based in Enrekang Regency, South Sulawesi. They currently competes in Liga 4.

== Current squad ==
As of December 2021

Note: Flags indicate national team as defined under FIFA eligibility rules; some limited exceptions apply. Players may hold more than one non-FIFA nationality.

No.	Pos.	Nation	Player
99	GK	IDN	Dandi R.
6	DF	IDN	Dandy
25	DF	IDN	Fatrio
41	DF	IDN	Muhammad Ardiansyah
47	DF	IDN	Imam Syambi
23	DF	IDN	Irgi
27	MF	IDN	Fachrul Rijal
53	MF	IDN	Simson
70	MF	IDN	Chaerul Anwar

No.	Pos.	Nation	Player
11	MF	IDN	Farhan
29	MF	IDN	Zulfiqri
78	MF	IDN	Muhammad Fatwa
5	MF	IDN	Herwin Halijas
21	MF	IDN	Imam Sarisan
9	MF	IDN	Muhammad Arham
10	MF	IDN	Muhammad Faizal
86	FW	IDN	Muhammad Ali
90	FW	IDN	Michael

== Honours ==
- Liga 3 South Sulawesi
  - Champion: 2021
- Habibie Cup
  - Winner: 2010
