= Persihalsel South Halmahera =

Indonesian football club

Persihalsel
- Full name: Persatuan Sepakbola Indonesia Halmahera Selatan
- Nickname: Laskar Sibela
- Founded: 2003; 23 years ago
- Ground: Gelora Bahrain Kasuba Stadium; Labuha, Bacan Island
- Owner: Askab PSSI Halmahera Selatan
- Coach: Ikram Selang
- League: Liga 3
- 2021–22: Liga 3, Round of 64 (National)
Home colours	Away colours	Third colours

Persatuan Sepakbola Indonesia Halmahera Selatan (simply known as Persihalsel) is an Indonesian football club based in Labuha, Bacan Island, South Halmahera Regency, North Maluku. They currently play in the Liga 3 and their homebase is Gelora Bahrain Kasuba Stadium.

== Honours ==
- Liga 3 North Maluku
  - Champion (1): 2021
