= PS Kota Singkawang =

Indonesian football club

- Full name: Persatuan Sepakbola Kota Singkawang
- Nickname: Kesatria Naga (The Dragon Knights)
- Ground: Kridasana Stadium; Singkawang, West Kalimantan
- Capacity: 10,000
- Owner: Askot PSSI Singkawang
- Chairman: Tjhai Chui Mie
- Manager: Sujianto
- Coach: Kurniadi
- League: Liga 3
- 2021: 4th in Group A, (West Kalimantan zone)
Home colours	Away colours

Persatuan Sepakbola Kota Singkawang (simply known as a PS Kota Singkawang) is an Indonesian football club based in Singkawang, West Kalimantan. Club played at Liga 3 and their homeground is Kridasana Stadium.
