= YOB Belawan =

Indonesian football club

- Full name: Young Olahraga Belawan
- Nickname: Paus Pembunuh
- Founded: 2017; 9 years ago
- Ground: Teladan Stadium; Medan
- Capacity: 20,000
- Owner: PT. Pelindo I
- Chairman: Hadi Suhendra
- Manager: Jaya Saputra
- Coach: Zefrizal
- League: Liga 3
- 2021–22: Liga 3, Round of 64 (National)
Home colours	Away colours

Young Olahraga Belawan is an Indonesian football club based in Belawan, Medan, North Sumatra. They currently compete in the Liga 3.

== History ==
YOB Belawan was established on 2017, YOB Belawan was founded on the initiative of football fans who are Belawan residents who want to establish a football club that uses its identity to the Region Professionally. The existence of this club aims to mobilize the spirit of the younger generation in Belawan to build football achievements.

The role of PT. Pelindo I is needed to support the steps that have been taken. For many years this club has been managed independently on a self-help basis, and YOB Belawan is now registered with the PSSI administration. Management and support from all parties are required.

== Honours ==
- Liga 3 North Sumatra
  - Runner-up: 2021
