= YSK 757 Karimun =

Indonesian football club

- Full name: Yayasan Sepakbola Karimun 757 Football Club
- Nickname: The Captains
- Dissolved: 2017
- Ground: Badang Perkasa Stadium; Karimun Regency, Riau Islands
- Capacity: 15,000
- Coach: Pendi Taufiq
- League: Liga Nusantara
- 2016: National Round
Home colours

YSK 757 Karimun or Yayasan Sepakbola Karimun 757 was an Indonesian football club based in Karimun Regency, Riau Islands, and nicknamed "The Captains". They used to play in the Liga Nusantara. The club was merged with PS Bintang Jaya Asahan in 2017 to form 757 Kepri Jaya F.C.

== Honours ==
- Liga Nusantara Riau Islands Region
  - Winners: 2016
