= Alesha F.C. =

Association football team in Indonesia

Alesha
- Full name: Alesha Football Club
- Nickname: The Pink Force
- Short name: AFC, ALSH
- Founded: 2019; 7 years ago
- Dissolved: 2022
- Ground: Gelora Sultan Hasanuddin Field; Makassar
- Owner: PT. Alesha Group Perkasa
- President: Ady Novandi
- Manager: Uki Nugraha
- Coach: Fathlul Rahman
- League: Liga 3
- 2021–22: Liga 3, Round of 64 (National)
Home colours	Away colours	Third colours

Alesha Football Club is an Indonesian football club from Makassar, South Sulawesi. Alesha FC is a club owned by a company PT Alesha Group Perkasa. they have just registered as official members of the Asprov PSSI South Sulawesi in Liga 3 and will debut to compete in 2021 Liga 3 South Sulawesi zone. In addition to having a main squad team, they also have a young squad that competed in the Soeratin Cup, namely Alesha FC U13, Alesha FC U15 and Alesha FC U17.

== History ==
Alesha FC was founded in October 2020 and participated in their inaugural tournament at 2020 Alesha Cup I in Makassar. At that time, the club was divided into 2 teams, namely Alesha FC A and Alesha FC B, they were included in the matches of the 32 participating teams. Alesha FC A became the runner-up while Alesha FC B stopped in the last 8 round.

In early 2021, they are preparing to take part in Liga 3. Various preparations for training and recruitment of selected players have been carried out as well as membership registration and administration to Asprov PSSI South Sulawesi.

== Players ==
As of 23 October 2021

Note: Flags indicate national team as defined under FIFA eligibility rules; some limited exceptions apply. Players may hold more than one non-FIFA nationality.

No.	Pos.	Nation	Player
—		IDN	Faiz
—		IDN	Aslam Tawakkal
—		IDN	Basna
—		IDN	Ihfan
—		IDN	Aris
27		IDN	Sulkifli
—		IDN	Multi
—		IDN	Damma
—		IDN	Arif Rahman
—		IDN	Muhammad Fahmikhul Haidi
—		IDN	Irfan Arfandy
—		IDN	Azwar
—		IDN	Ardi
—		IDN	Alfatan
—		IDN	Patman

No.	Pos.	Nation	Player
—		IDN	Hendra Ridwan
—		IDN	Shandy
—		IDN	Jefri
—		IDN	Irsan
—		IDN	Marcelino
—		IDN	Raul
—		IDN	Ardiansyah
—		IDN	Rafli
—		IDN	Fadly Nasir
—		IDN	Idul
—		IDN	Kante
—		IDN	Yasir
—		IDN	Aldi
—		IDN	Munawar Sahin

== Honours ==
- Liga 3 South Sulawesi
  - Runner-up: 2021
