= Gasko Kolaka =

Indonesian football club

Gasko
- Full name: Gabungan Sepakbola Kolaka
- Nickname: Elang Mekongga
- Founded: 1960; 66 years ago
- Ground: Gelora Kolaka Stadium
- Capacity: 10,000
- Owner: PSSI Kolaka Regency
- Chairman: Parmin Dasir
- Coach: Jud Tery
- League: Liga 3
- 2021: 1st, (Southeast Sulawesi zone)
Home colours	Away colours

Gabungan Sepakbola Kolaka, commonly known as Gasko, is an Indonesian football club based in Kolaka Regency, Southeast Sulawesi. They currently compete in the Liga 4 Southeast Sulawesi zone.

== Honours ==
- Liga 3 Southeast Sulawesi
  - Champion (1): 2021
