= PS Delta Khatulistiwa =

Indonesian football club in West Kalimantan

- Full name: Persatuan Sepakbola Delta Khatulistiwa
- Nickname: Laskar Khatulistiwa (Equator Warriors)
- Short name: PSDK
- Founded: 31 July 2008; 17 years ago
- Ground: Sultan Syarif Abdurrahman Stadium, Pontianak, West Kalimantan
- Capacity: 5,500
- Owner: Irwan Syahril
- Manager: Cundrik Pamungkas
- Coach: Reffa Money
- League: Liga 3
- 2023: Quarterfinals, (West Kalimantan zone)
Home colours	Away colours

Persatuan Sepakbola Delta Khatulistiwa (simply known as PS Delta Khatulistiwa) is an Indonesian football club based in Pontianak, West Kalimantan. They currently compete in the Liga 3 and their homeground is Sultan Syarif Abdurrahman Stadium.

== Honours ==
- Liga 3 West Kalimantan
  - Champion (1): 2017
  - Runner-up (1): 2021
