= Persidago Gorontalo =

Association football team in Indonesia

- Full name: Persatuan Sepakbola Indonesia Daerah Gorontalo
- Nicknames: Laskar Menara (The Tower Warriors); Si Pembunuh Raksasa (The Giant Killer)
- Founded: 1959; 67 years ago
- Ground: Gelora 23 January Stadium; Gorontalo Regency, Gorontalo
- Capacity: 6,000
- Owner: Askab PSSI Gorontalo
- Coach: Farid Thanib
- League: Liga 4
- 2024–25: 4th, (Gorontalo zone)
Home colours	Away colours

Persidago, which stands for Persatuan Sepakbola Indonesia Daerah Gorontalo, is an Indonesian football club based in Limboto, Gorontalo Regency, Gorontalo. This club play in Liga 4. Their home stadium is Gelora 23 January Stadium.

In 2019, they entered Round 16 of the Piala Indonesia after defeating Persipura Jayapura with an aggregate score of 2–2 (win 1–0 home, loss 1–2 away).

== Honours ==
- Liga 3 Gorontalo
  - Champions (5): 2014, 2017, 2019, 2021, 2022
