= Gasliko 50 Kota =

Indonesian football club

Gasliko Lima Puluh Kota
- Full name: Gabungan Sepakbola Lima Puluh Kota
- Nickname: Singa Harau
- Founded: 1951; 75 years ago
- Ground: Singa Harau Stadium; Lima Puluh Kota, West Sumatra
- Owner: Askab PSSI Lima Puluh Kota
- Chairman: Rizki Kurniawan Nakasri
- Manager: Beri Okto Minanda
- Coach: Hudra
- League: Liga 4
- 2021–22: Liga 3, Round of 64 (National)
Home colours	Away colours

Gabungan Sepakbola Lima Puluh Kota or Gasliko is an Indonesian football club based in Lima Puluh Kota, West Sumatra. They currently compete in the Liga 4.

== Honours ==
- Liga 3 West Sumatra
  - Runner-up: 2021
