= Panipi Raya F.C. =

Indonesian football club in Gorontalo

Panipi Raya
- Full name: Panipi Raya Football Club
- Short name: PRFC
- Founded: 26 March 2016; 10 years ago
- Ground: Porbat Batudaa Field; Gorontalo
- Owner: Askab PSSI Gorontalo
- Manager: Asep Hemeto
- Coach: Aswan Hemeto
- League: Liga 4
- 2021–22: Liga 3, Round of 64 (National)
Home colours	Away colours

Panipi Raya Football Club (simply known as Panipi Raya) is an Indonesian football club based in Gorontalo Regency, Gorontalo. They currently compete in the Liga 4 and their home ground is Porbat Batudaa Field.

== Players ==
=== Current squad ===
As of 17 March 2022

Note: Flags indicate national team as defined under FIFA eligibility rules; some limited exceptions apply. Players may hold more than one non-FIFA nationality.

No.	Pos.	Nation	Player
1	GK	IDN	Andika Tahir
2	DF	IDN	Ibrahim Iti
3	DF	IDN	Andika Dukalang
4	DF	IDN	Fikran Irwan
5	DF	IDN	Anan Abdullah
6	DF	IDN	Priyatno Nento
7	FW	IDN	Adam Wontami
8	MF	IDN	Tristan Ali
9	FW	IDN	Fahrul Ishak
10	MF	IDN	Ismunandar Monoarfa
11	MF	IDN	Kifli Soamole
12	FW	IDN	Abdul Azis Iko
13	DF	IDN	Zulkifli Keya
14	DF	IDN	Firmansyah Moh
15	MF	IDN	Idrak Dukalang

No.	Pos.	Nation	Player
16	FW	IDN	Padri Nurkamiden
17	MF	IDN	Erick Monoarfa
18	FW	IDN	Afrian Tuba
19	FW	IDN	Harun Iti
20	GK	IDN	Aliksan Ibrahim
21	FW	IDN	Indra Deoli
22	DF	IDN	Polapa
23	MF	IDN	Mohammad Arya
24	DF	IDN	Zul Ilham Antula
25	FW	IDN	Rahmat Adam
26	MF	IDN	Rahmat Naki
27	MF	IDN	Ferliyawan Rahman Naki
28	MF	IDN	Hernandy Luawo
29	MF	IDN	Rizki Paputungan
30	DF	IDN	Zulkifli Maku

== Honours ==
- Liga 3 Gorontalo
  - Runner-up: 2021
