= Pandan Arang Stadium =

Indonesian stadium

Pandan Arang
- Full name: Pandan Arang Stadium
- Location: Boyolali Regency, Central Java
- Owner: Persebi Boyolali
- Capacity: 15,000

Tenant
- Persebi Boyolali

The Pandan Arang Stadium is a multi-use stadium in the village of Boyolali Regency, Central Java, Indonesia. It is used mostly for football matches, most notably by Persebi Boyolali. The stadium has a capacity of 15,000. In 2018, the local government planned to relocate the stadium.
