= PS Pulau Indah =

Indonesian football club in West Kalimantan

- Full name: Persatuan Sepakbola Pulau Indah
- Nickname: Laskar Elang Laut
- Founded: 2020; 6 years ago as Sambas Putra FC
- Ground: Gabsis Stadium; Sambas Regency, West Kalimantan
- Owner: Askab PSSI Sambas
- Manager: Rudi Aphen
- Coach: Arif Trisandi
- League: Liga 4
- 2024–25: 4th in Group A, (West Kalimantan zone)
Home colours	Away colours

Persatuan Sepakbola Pulau Indah (simply known as PS Pulau Indah) is an Indonesian football club based in Sambas Regency, West Kalimantan. They currently compete in the Liga 4 and their homeground is Gabsis Stadium.

== Players ==
As of 12 February 2025

Note: Flags indicate national team as defined under FIFA eligibility rules; some limited exceptions apply. Players may hold more than one non-FIFA nationality.

No.	Pos.	Nation	Player
—	GK	IDN	Wawan Alfiandi
—	GK	IDN	Noufal Ashraf
—	GK	IDN	Giwang Setiawan
—	DF	IDN	Haris Kurniawan
—	DF	IDN	Sarip
—	DF	IDN	Hamid
—	DF	IDN	Muhammad Aqil
—	DF	IDN	Boni Candra
—	DF	IDN	Muhammad Kholik
—	DF	IDN	Hairul

No.	Pos.	Nation	Player
—	MF	IDN	Hidayat
—	MF	IDN	Muhammad
—	MF	IDN	Faizal
—	MF	IDN	Azizul
—	MF	IDN	Sandamagi
—	MF	IDN	Agustiar
—	FW	IDN	Anjaswara
—	FW	IDN	Okto Dinando
—	FW	IDN	Mursalin
—	FW	IDN	Rozlan
—	FW	IDN	Aidil
