= PS Boalemo =

Indonesian football club

- Full name: Persatuan Sepakbola Boalemo
- Ground: Gelora Pemuda Stadium; Boalemo, Gorontalo
- Capacity: 5.000
- Owner: Askab PSSI Boalemo
- Manager: Popon Samudra
- Coach: Nover Mopangga
- League: Liga 4
- 2024–25: 6th, (Gorontalo zone)
Home colours	Away colours

Persatuan Sepakbola Boalemo, commonly known as PS Boalemo, is an Indonesian football club based in Boalemo Regency, Gorontalo. They currently compete in the Liga 4 Gorontalo Zone.

== Honours ==
- Liga Nusantara
  - Champion (1): 2016
- Liga 3 Gorontalo
  - Runner-up (1): 2022
