= Kalbar United F.C. =

Indonesian football club

Kalbar United
- Full name: Kalimantan Barat United Football Club
- Nickname: Mandau Kapuas (Kapuas Blades)
- Short name: KUN
- Founded: 2023; 3 years ago
- Ground: Sultan Syarif Abdurrahman Stadium
- Capacity: 5,500
- Owner: Askot PSSI Pontianak
- Coach
- League: Liga 3
- 2023–24: 1st, (West Kalimantan zone); 3rd in Group P, (National)
Home colours	Away colours

Kalimantan Barat United Football Club, commonly known as Kalbar United, is an Indonesian football club based in Pontianak, West Kalimantan. They currently compete in the Liga 3.

== Honours ==
- Liga 3 West Kalimantan
  - Champions: 2023–24
