= Persista Sintang =

Indonesian football club

- Full name: Persatuan Sepakbola Indonesia Sintang
- Nickname: Pendekar Bukit Kelam (Dark Hill Warriors)
- Short name: Persista
- Founded: 1999; 27 years ago
- Ground: Baning Stadium; Sintang, West Kalimantan
- Capacity: 5,000
- Owner: Sintang Government
- Manager: Santosa
- Coach: Agus Enthe
- League: Liga 4
- 2023: Quarter-finals, (Liga3 West Kalimantan zone)
Home colours	Away colours

Persatuan Sepakbola Indonesia Sintang (simply known as Persista) is an Indonesian football club based in Sintang, West Kalimantan. They currently plays in Liga 4 West Kalimantan zone.
