= Gabsis Sambas =

Indonesian football club

- Full name: Gabungan Sepakbola Indonesia Sambas
- Nicknames: Elang Laut Borneo (Borneo Sea Eagle)
- Short name: Gabsis
- Ground: Gabsis Stadium; Sambas, West Kalimantan
- Capacity: 5,000
- Owner: PSSI Sambas Regency
- Chairman: H. Eko Suprihantino
- Manager: Eko Budi Santoso
- Coach: Panji Hidayat
- League: Liga 1
- 2024–25: 1st (West Kalimantan zone); First round, 4th in Group D (National phase)
Home colours	Away colours

Gabungan Sepakbola Indonesia Sambas (simply known as Gabsis) is an Indonesian football team based in Sambas, West Kalimantan. They currently competes in Liga 4.

== Honours ==
- Liga 3 West Kalimantan
  - Champions (1): 2021
- Liga 4 West Kalimantan
  - Champions (1): 2024–25
