= PS Kubu Raya =

Association football team in Indonesia

- Full name: Persatuan Sepakbola Kubu Raya
- Nicknames: Laskar Menanjak (Climbing Warriors)
- Short name: PSKR
- Founded: 2008; 18 years ago
- Ground: Garuda Stadium; Kubu Raya, West Kalimantan
- Capacity: 5,000
- Owner: Kubu Raya Government
- Chairman: Syarif Amin
- Manager: Musa Abdul Hamid
- Coach: Tajudin
- League: Liga 4
- 2023: Quarter-finals, (West Kalimantan zone)
Home colours	Away colours

Persatuan Sepakbola Kubu Raya (simply known as PS Kubu Raya) is an Indonesian football club based in Kubu Raya Regency, West Kalimantan. They currently compete in the Liga 4 West Kalimantan zone.
