= Bantul =

Town and district in Yogyakarta Province, Indonesia

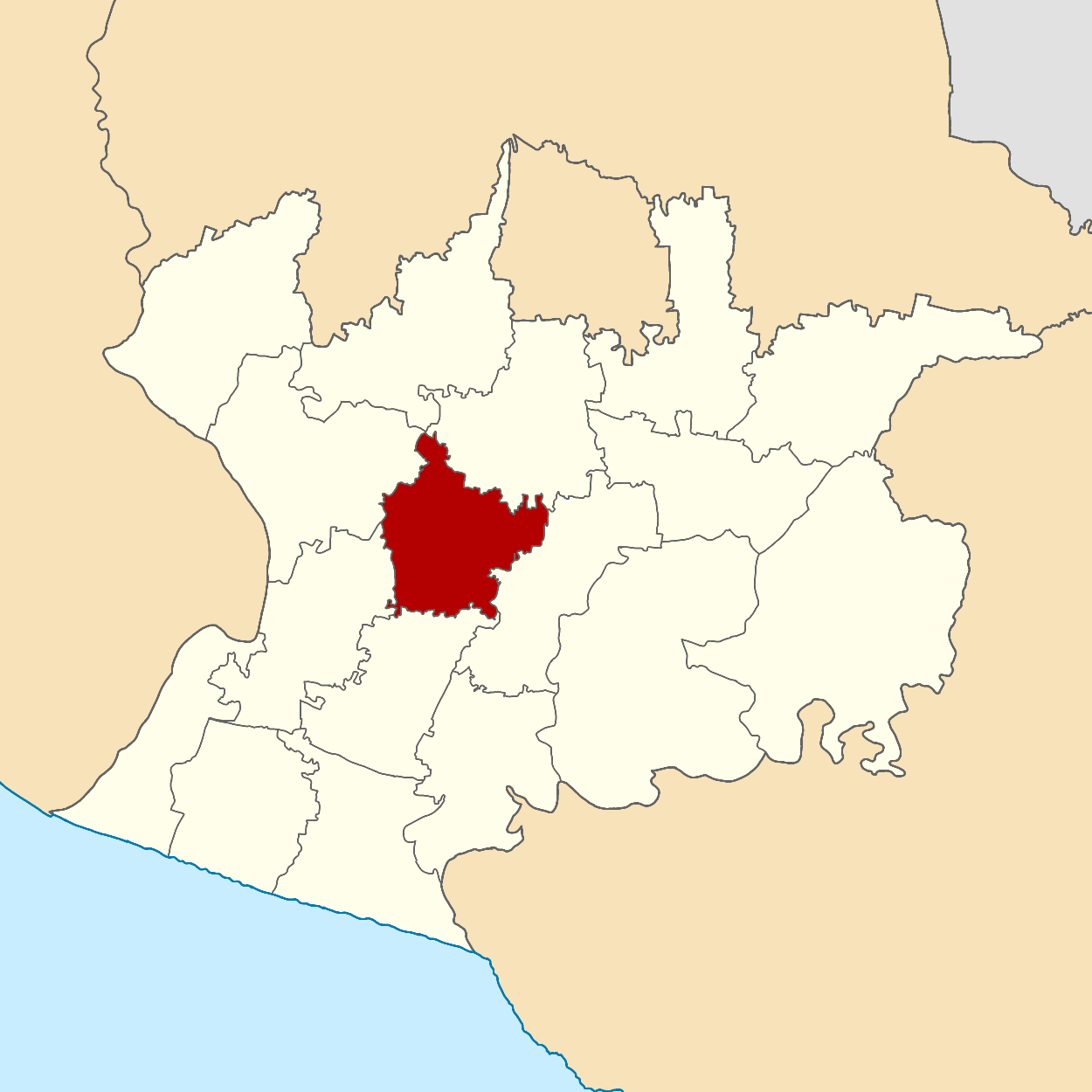
Bantul location in Bantul Regency

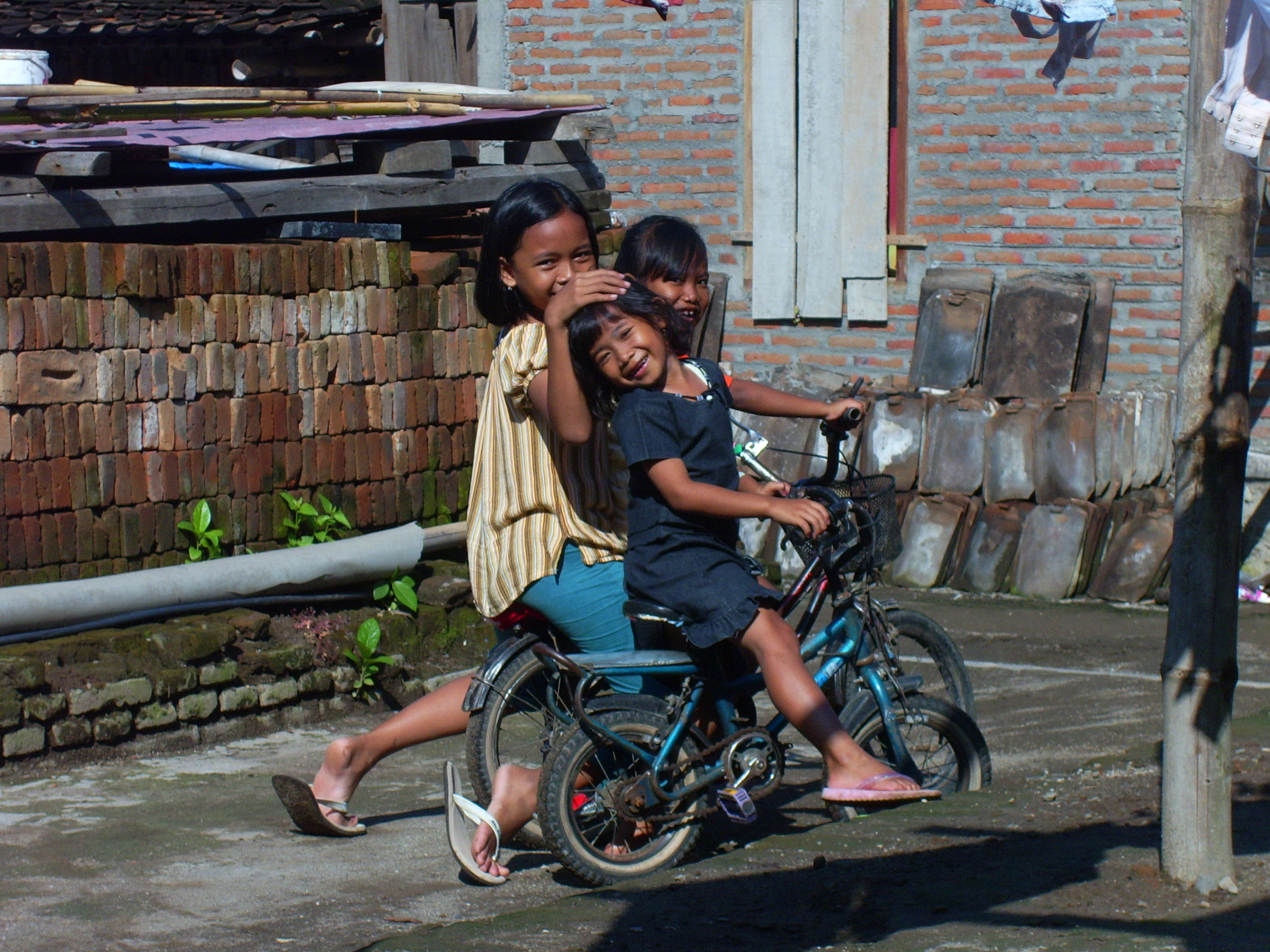
Three young girls in Bantul

Bantul is a town and district, and the capital of Bantul Regency, Special Region of Yogyakarta, Indonesia. The district (kapanewon) covers an area of 21.95 km^{2} (8.47 sq mi) and had a population of 64,360 at the 2020 Census. It is a bustling town about 10 km (6.2 mi) to the south of Yogyakarta, easily reached by regular minibuses from the main Yogyakarta bus station. Bantul has numerous firms and agencies (service stations and garages, banks, schools, medical clinics, government offices) which supply services to the surrounding area. A main road runs down from Yogyakarta through Bantul to the busy beach area of Parangtritis visited by many tourists from Yogyakarta each weekend.

== 2006 earthquake ==
On 27 May 2006 an earthquake measuring 6.4 on the moment magnitude scale struck near Java's southern coast causing widespread damage. Bantul Regency was the region most affected by the disaster. More than 2,000 residents of Bantul were killed, thousands of its residents injured, and 80% of its homes damaged or destroyed.

== Climate ==
Bantul has a tropical monsoon climate (Am) with moderate to little rainfall from June to October and heavy to very heavy rainfall from November to May. Favorite and common snacks are Adrem (snacks)

Climate data for Bantul
Month	Jan	Feb	Mar	Apr	May	Jun	Jul	Aug	Sep	Oct	Nov	Dec	Year
Mean daily maximum °C (°F)	30.4 (86.7)	30.7 (87.3)	30.9 (87.6)	31.7 (89.1)	31.5 (88.7)	31.3 (88.3)	30.5 (86.9)	30.9 (87.6)	31.2 (88.2)	31.6 (88.9)	31.0 (87.8)	30.6 (87.1)	31.0 (87.9)
Daily mean °C (°F)	26.9 (80.4)	26.9 (80.4)	27.1 (80.8)	27.5 (81.5)	27.2 (81.0)	26.5 (79.7)	25.6 (78.1)	25.8 (78.4)	26.6 (79.9)	27.2 (81.0)	27.1 (80.8)	27.0 (80.6)	26.8 (80.2)
Mean daily minimum °C (°F)	23.4 (74.1)	23.2 (73.8)	23.4 (74.1)	23.4 (74.1)	23.0 (73.4)	21.8 (71.2)	20.8 (69.4)	20.8 (69.4)	22.0 (71.6)	22.9 (73.2)	23.3 (73.9)	23.4 (74.1)	22.6 (72.7)
Average rainfall mm (inches)	348 (13.7)	301 (11.9)	317 (12.5)	125 (4.9)	125 (4.9)	50 (2.0)	34 (1.3)	21 (0.8)	34 (1.3)	122 (4.8)	217 (8.5)	267 (10.5)	1,961 (77.1)
Source: Climate-Data.org
