= Moh Sarengat Stadium =

Football stadium in Batang, Central Java, Indonesia

- Location in Java
- Location: Batang, Batang Regency, Central Java, Indonesia
- Coordinates: 6°54′5.1″S 109°43′2.1″E
- Owner: Government of Batang Regency
- Operator: Government of Batang Regency
- Capacity: 15,000
- Surface: Grass field

Tenant
- Persibat Batang

Moh Sarengat Stadium is the name of a football stadium in the town of Batang, Batang Regency, Central Java, Indonesia. The stadium has the capacity of 20,000 and is equipped with a football field. It was named after a former athlete from the local neighbourhood who once broke a new Asian sprint record (10.4 seconds) in the Asian Games IV held in 1962 in Jakarta. Mr. Sarengat was regarded as the fastest runner in Asia for his achievement. Jogging tracks are being built in the stadium in 2025.
