= Persipon Pontianak =

Indonesian football club

Persipon
- Full name: Persatuan Sepakbola Indonesia Pontianak
- Nicknames: Elang Khatulistiwa (Eagle of Equator)
- Short name: Persipon
- Founded: 1970; 56 years ago
- Ground: Sultan Syarif Abdurrahman Stadium, Pontianak, West Kalimantan
- Capacity: 15,000
- Owner: PT. Persipon Elang Khatulistiwa
- Manager: Lely Suheri
- Coach: Hamdani
- League: Liga 4
- 2024–25: 2nd, (Liga 4 West Kalimantan zone)
Home colours	Away colours

Persatuan Sepakbola Indonesia Pontianak (simply known as Persipon) is an Indonesian football club based in Pontianak, West Kalimantan. They currently compete in Liga 4 West Kalimantan zone.

== Season-by-season records ==
Season	League	Tier	Tms.	Pos.	Piala Indonesia
2006	Second Division	3	48	2	–
2007	First Division	2	40	7th, Group III	Round of 32
2008–09	First Division	3	48	4th, Second round	–
2009–10	First Division	3	60	3rd, Second round	–
2010	First Division	3	57	3rd, Group VII	–
2011–12	First Division (LPIS)	3	66	3	–
2013	Premier Division (LPIS)	2	21	7th, Group 1	–
2014	Premier Division	2	63	5th, Group 3	–
2015	Premier Division	2	55	did not finish	–
2016					
2017	Liga 2	2	61	7th, Group 4	–
2018	Liga 3	3	32	Eliminated in National zone route	First round
2019	Liga 3	3	32	Eliminated in Provincial round	First round
2020	Liga 3	3	season abandoned		–
2021–22	Liga 3	3	64	Eliminated in Provincial round	–
2022–23	Liga 3	3	season abandoned		–
2023–24	Liga 3	3	80	Eliminated in Provincial round	–
2024–25	Liga 4	4	64	Eliminated in Provincial round	–
