= Persikat Ketapang =

Indonesian football club in West Kalimantan

- Full name: Persatuan Sepakbola Indonesia Ketapang
- Nickname: Laskar Tanjungpura (Tanjungpura Warriors)
- Founded: 30 November 1987; 38 years ago
- Ground: Tentemak Stadium; Ketapang, West Kalimantan
- Capacity: 3,000
- Owner: Askab PSSI Ketapang
- Chairman: Abdulbad H.A Rani
- Manager: Nasdiansyah
- Coach: Jefridin Anwar
- League: Liga 4
- 2023–24: Semi-finals, (West Kalimantan zone); 4th in Group K, (National)
Home colours	Away colours

Persatuan Sepakbola Indonesia Ketapang (simply known as Persikat Ketapang) is an Indonesian football club based in Ketapang, West Kalimantan. They currently compete in the Liga 4 and their homeground is Tentemak Stadium.

== Honours ==
- Liga 3 West Kalimantan
  - Champion (1): 2019
