= Sultan Syarif Abdurrahman Stadium =

Football stadium in Pontianak, West Kalimantan, Indonesia

Coordinates: 0°02′47″S 109°20′15″E

- Interactive map of Sultan Syarif Abdurrahman Stadium
- Location: Pontianak, West Kalimantan
- Owner: Pontianak City Government
- Capacity: 5,500

Construction
- Opened: 3 May 1985; 41 years ago

Tenant
- Persipon Pontianak

Sultan Syarif Abdurrahman Stadium is an association football stadium in Pontianak, West Kalimantan, which is also home of Persipon Pontianak. It has a seating capacity of 5,500.
