= 2023–24 Liga 3 (Indonesia) =

Eight season of the Liga 3 in Indonesia

Liga 3
- Season: 2023–24
- Dates: Provincial phase: 10 August 2023 – 10 March 2024; National phase: 29 April – 7 June 2024
- Champions: Adhyaksa Farmel (1st title)
- Promoted: Adhyaksa Farmel; Persibo; Dejan; Persikota; Persiku; Persikas
- Matches: 237
- Goals: 763 (3.22 per match)
- Best player: (Indonesia) Sehabudin Ahmad
- Top goalscorer: (Indonesia) Andi Sopian (9 goals)
- Biggest home win: Provincial phase: Josal 20–0 Sukur (14 December 2023); National phase: PS Cimahi Putra 7–1 PS Boalemo (3 May 2024)
- Biggest away win: Provincial phase: PSBK-PETA 0–11 Persedikab Kediri (17 December 2023); National phase: Persim Maros 0–6 Perseden Denpasar (29 April 2024); PS Boalemo 1–7 Persika 1951 (1 May 2024)
- Highest scoring: Provincial phase: Josal 20–0 Sukur (14 December 2023); National phase: PS Boalemo 1–7 Persika 1951 (1 May 2024); PS Cimahi Putra 7–1 PS Boalemo (3 May 2024)

2023–24 Liga 3 was the seventh season of the Liga 3 under the current name and the eighth season under the current league structure, and the only amateur league football competition in Indonesia. The tournament was organized by Provincial Association of PSSI for the provincial phase and PSSI for the national phase.

Karo United was the champions in the 2021–22 season.

Because Liga 2's previous season along with 2022–23 Liga 3 were abandoned due to a combination of factors with the most notable among them was the Kanjuruhan Stadium disaster, participants of the league remained unchanged from last season.

== Teams changes ==
As the 2022–23 Liga 2 and 2022–23 Liga 3 were abandoned along with the relegation rule which was being scrapped from 2022–23 Liga 1, the league's teams remained unchanged. The following teams changed division after the 2021 season.

▲ Promoted to 2022–23 Liga 2	▼ Relegated from 2021–22 Liga 2
Karo United; Putra Delta Sidoarjo; Mataram Utama; PSDS Deli Serdang; Deltras; Persikab Bandung; Gresik United; Persipa Pati	PS Mitra Kukar; Badak Lampung; KS Tiga Naga; Hizbul Wathan

Notes

1. Karo United (KUN): changed name to Sada Sumut.
2. Putra Delta Sidoarjo (PDS): changed name to Malut United.
3. Mataram Utama (MUN): changed name to Nusantara United.

== Rules ==
Here are some rules for the 2023 season:

=== Participating team ===
- PSSI member clubs or PSSI member candidate clubs who have completed the registration administration requirements as a member of PSSI and have received approval at the relevant provincial PSSI annual congress.
- Registration of participating clubs via the online system SIAP (Sistem Informasi dan Administrasi PSSI).
- All clubs participating in Liga 3 2023 compete in the provincial round, there is no pre-national round for the participants of Liga 3 2022–2023 because league was cancelled.
- Aspects of football development, enough time lag between one match to another.

=== Player ===
- The age of the players is the birth of 1 January 2001 to 31 December 2005, and 7 senior players.
- The maximum number of registered players is 30 players.
- Minimum trainer licence B PSSI Licence.
- The maximum number of registered officials is 10 peoples.
- Player registration via online system SIAP (Sistem Informasi dan Administrasi PSSI).

== Teams ==
A total of 436 teams participated in the provincial phase of 2023–24 Liga 3.

Sumatra Region (102 teams)
Provincial leagues	Participating teams
Aceh	25
North Sumatra	13
Riau	12
Riau Islands	7
West Sumatra	12
Jambi	9
Bengkulu	11
Bangka Belitung Islands	3
South Sumatra	4
Lampung	6

Kalimantan Region (40 teams)
Provincial leagues	Participating teams
West Kalimantan	13
Central Kalimantan	Not held
South Kalimantan	10
East Kalimantan	15
North Kalimantan	2

Java Region (182 teams)
Provincial leagues	Participating teams
Banten	17
Jakarta	13
West Java	24 (series 1)
West Java	42 (series 2)
Central Java	22
(Special Region of Yogyakarta) Yogyakarta	11
East Java	53

Lesser Sunda Islands Region (60 teams)
Provincial leagues	Participating teams
Bali	8
West Nusa Tenggara	25
East Nusa Tenggara	27

Sulawesi Region (65 teams)
Provincial leagues	Participating teams
Gorontalo	4
North Sulawesi	15
Central Sulawesi	8
West Sulawesi	10
South Sulawesi	18
Southeast Sulawesi	10

Maluku Region (4 teams)
Provincial leagues	Participating teams
(Maluku (province)) Maluku	4
North Maluku	Not held

Papua Region (19 teams)
Provincial leagues	Participating teams
(West Papua (province)) West Papua; Southwest Papua	9
(Papua (province)) Papua; Central Papua; Highland Papua	10

== Schedule ==
The schedule of the competition is as follows.

Phase	Round	Draw date	Matchday	Date
Provincial phase	Depending on the league system in each province.			10 August 2023 – 10 March 2024
National Phase	Preliminary round (80 teams)	26 March 2024	Matchday 1	29–30 April 2024
National Phase	Preliminary round (80 teams)	26 March 2024	Matchday 2	1–2 May 2024
National Phase	Preliminary round (80 teams)	26 March 2024	Matchday 3	3–4 May 2024
National Phase	Preliminary round (80 teams)	26 March 2024	Matchday 4	5–6 May 2024
National Phase	Preliminary round (80 teams)	26 March 2024	Matchday 5	7–8 May 2024
National Phase	Second round (32 teams)	No draw	Matchday 1	11–12 May 2024
National Phase	Second round (32 teams)	No draw	Matchday 2	13–14 May 2024
National Phase	Second round (32 teams)	No draw	Matchday 3	15–16 May 2024
National Phase	Third round (16 teams)	17 May 2024	Matchday 1	21 May 2024
National Phase	Third round (16 teams)	17 May 2024	Matchday 2	23 May 2024
National Phase	Third round (16 teams)	17 May 2024	Matchday 3	25 May 2024
National Phase	Fourth round (8 teams)	No draw	Matchday 1	30 May 2024
National Phase	Fourth round (8 teams)	No draw	Matchday 2	1 June 2024
National Phase	Fourth round (8 teams)	No draw	Matchday 3	3 June 2024
National Phase	Knockout round (2 teams)	No draw	Final	7 June 2024

== Provincial Phase ==
=== 2023–24 season ===
These teams will be the representatives from their provincial league to be competing in national phase.

**Sumatra Region**
Province	Qualified teams
Aceh	**PSBL Langsa**
Aceh	PSAB Aceh Besar
Aceh	Persidi Idi Rayeuk
Aceh	PS Peureulak Raya
North Sumatra	**Labura Hebat**
North Sumatra	PS PTPN III
Riau	**PS Siak**
Riau	Tornado
Riau Islands (Note: 757 Kepri Jaya are the champions of 2023 Liga 3 Riau Islands and as such are eligible to qualify, but have ensured themselves an early qualification to the national phase based on their performance in the 2022–23 season.)	MBS United
West Sumatra	**Josal Piaman**
West Sumatra	PSPP Padang Panjang
Jambi	**Persebri Batanghari**
Bengkulu	**Tri Brata Rafflesia**
Bangka Belitung Islands	**PS Beltim**
South Sumatra	**PS Palembang**
Lampung	**TS Saiburai**

**Kalimantan Region**
Province	Qualified teams
West Kalimantan	**Kalbar United**
West Kalimantan	Persikat Ketapang (Note: As of 13 March 2024, PSSI confirmed that Dodos withdrew from the national phase due to the club's financial problems. Instead, the remaining slot was given to Persikat Ketapang as the semifinalist of 2023–24 Liga 3 West Kalimantan.)
Central Kalimantan	Not held
South Kalimantan	**PS Kab. Tapin**
South Kalimantan	PS Talenta Banua
East Kalimantan	**Kartanegara (Mesra)**
East Kalimantan	Caladium (Note: As of 20 March 2024, Asprov PSSI East Kalimantan confirmed that Sangkulirang withdrew from the national phase due to the club's financial problems. Instead, the remaining slot was given to Caladium as the third place of 2023–24 Liga 3 East Kalimantan.)
North Kalimantan	No eligible slots

**Java Region**
Province	Qualified teams
Banten	**Adhyaksa Farmel**
Banten	Persic Cilegon (Note: Persikota Tangerang are the runner-up of 2023 Liga 3 Banten and as such are eligible to qualify, but have ensured themselves an early qualification to the national phase based on their performance in the 2022–23 season. Thus, the slot was given to the third-placed team, Persic Cilegon.)
Jakarta	**ASIOP**
Jakarta	Persitara North Jakarta
West Java (Note: Persipasi Kota Bekasi are the champions of 2023 Liga 3 West Java Series 1 and as such are eligible to qualify, but have ensured themselves an early qualification to the national phase based on their performance in the 2022–23 season.)	Persikas Subang
West Java	PSGC Ciamis
West Java	Persika 1951
West Java	PS Cimahi Putra
West Java	Persipu
West Java	Persigar Garut (Note: As of 1 March 2024, Asprov PSSI West Java confirmed that Depok City withdrew from the national phase due to the club's financial problems. Instead, the remaining slot was given to Persigar Garut as the eighth-ranked team of 2023 Liga 3 West Java Series 1.)
Central Java (Note: Persip Pekalongan are the champions of 2023 Liga 3 Central Java and as such are eligible to qualify, but have ensured themselves an early qualification to the national phase based on their performance in the 2022–23 season.)	Persibangga Purbalingga
Central Java	Persiku Kudus
Central Java	Universitas Surakarta
Central Java	Persab Brebes
(Special Region of Yogyakarta) Yogyakarta	**Persiba Bantul**
(Special Region of Yogyakarta) Yogyakarta	PS HW UMY
East Java	**Persibo Bojonegoro**
East Java	Persedikab Kediri
East Java	Persekabpas Pasuruan
East Java	NZR Sumbersari
East Java	Pasuruan United
East Java	PSM Madiun

**Lesser Sunda Islands Region**
Province	Qualified teams
Bali (Note: Perseden Denpasar are the champions of 2023 Liga 3 Bali and as such are eligible to qualify, but have ensured themselves an early qualification to the national phase based on their performance in the 2022–23 season.)	PS Putra Angkasa Kapal
West Nusa Tenggara	**PS Mataram**
East Nusa Tenggara	**PSN Ngada**

**Sulawesi Region**
Province	Qualified teams
Gorontalo	No eligible slots
North Sulawesi	**Persmin Minahasa**
Central Sulawesi	**Bandar Sulteng**
West Sulawesi	**PS Polmas**
South Sulawesi	**Mangiwang**
South Sulawesi	Persim Maros
South Sulawesi	QDR
Southeast Sulawesi	**UHO MZF**

**Maluku Region**
Province	Qualified teams
(Maluku (province)) Maluku (Note: Maluku are the champions of 2023 Liga 3 Maluku and as such are eligible to qualify, but have ensured themselves an early qualification to the national phase based on their performance in the 2022–23 season.)	PS Pelauw Putra
North Maluku	Not held

**Papua Region**
Province	Qualified teams
(West Papua (province)) West Papua; Southwest Papua	**Persegaf Arfak Mountains**
(Papua (province)) Papua; Central Papua; Highland Papua	**Waanal Brothers**

Notes

- BOLD: Champions of each provincial league.
- Grey background denotes provinces that did not send representative to the national phase.

=== Free slots ===
14 provincial associations received free slots to the national phase based on their performance in the 2022–23 season, as not all provincial associations organised competitions for the provincial phase in the 2022–23 season.

**Sumatra Region**
Province	Qualified teams
Riau Islands	**757 Kepri Jaya**
South Sumatra	**Persimuba Musi Banyuasin**

**Lesser Sunda Islands Region**
Province	Qualified teams
Bali	**Perseden Denpasar**
Bali	~~Singaraja ZFP~~
East Nusa Tenggara	**Perse Ende**

**Kalimantan Region**
Province	Qualified teams
South Kalimantan	**Persetala Tanah Laut**

**Java Region**
Province	Qualified teams
Banten	**Serpong City**
Banten	Persikota Tangerang
West Java	**Persipasi Kota Bekasi**
West Java	Dejan
West Java	Persikasi Bekasi
West Java	Persipo Purwakarta
Central Java	**Persip Pekalongan**
Central Java	PSIK Klaten
Central Java	PSIW Wonosobo
Central Java	PSDB United

**Sulawesi Region**
Province	Qualified teams
Gorontalo	**Persidago Gorontalo**
Gorontalo	PS Boalemo
Central Sulawesi	**Persipal Palu Youth**
South Sulawesi	**Persibone Bone**

**Maluku Region**
Province	Qualified teams
(Maluku (province)) Maluku	~~**Maluku**~~
North Maluku	**Morotai United**

**Papua Region**
Province	Qualified teams
(Papua (province)) Papua	**Persipani Paniai**

Notes

- BOLD: Champions of each provincial league.

== National Phase (Preliminary Round) ==
=== Teams location ===
Locations of non-Java-based 2023–24 Liga 3 National phase teams
Red: Zone 1; Orange: Zone 2; Yellow: Zone 3; Green: Zone 4; Blue: Zone 5.

Locations of Java-based 2023–24 Liga 3 National phase teams
Red: Zone 1; Orange: Zone 2; Yellow: Zone 3; Green: Zone 4; Blue: Zone 5.

=== Format ===
A total of 80 teams will be drawn into 16 groups of 5 teams. The preliminary round will be played in single round-robin matches.

16 group winners and 16 runners-up will advance to the second round.

=== Draw ===
The draw was held online via the official PSSI YouTube channel on 26 March 2024. 80 teams divided into 5 zones based on their geographical location. However, 2 teams then decided to withdraw ahead of the national phase.

The following draw mechanism is applied:
1. The 16 host teams are seeded and automatically drawn sequentially into groups A–P.
2. The draw started with zone 1 and ended with zone 5.
3. Teams from the same zone cannot be drawn into the same group.

Based on geographical location
Zone 1	Zone 2	Zone 3	Zone 4	Zone 5
1. (Aceh) PSBL Langsa; 2. PSAB Aceh Besar; 3. (Aceh) Persidi Idi Rayeuk; 4. (Aceh) PS Peureulak Raya; 5. (North Sumatra) **Labura Hebat**; 6. (North Sumatra) PS PTPN III; 7. (West Sumatra) **Josal Piaman**; 8. (West Sumatra) PSPP Padang Panjang; 9. (Riau) **PS Siak**; 10. (Riau) **Tornado**; 11. (Riau Islands) **757 Kepri Jaya**; 12. (Riau Islands) MBS United; 13. (Jambi) Persebri Batanghari; 14. (Bengkulu) **Tri Brata Rafflesia**; 15. (South Sumatra) Persimuba Musi Banyuasin; 16. (South Sumatra) **PS Palembang**	17. (Bangka Belitung Islands) **PS Beltim**; 18. (Lampung) TS Saiburai; 19. (Banten) Persic Cilegon; 20. (Banten) **Adhyaksa Farmel**; 21. (Banten) Serpong City; 22. (Banten) **Persikota Tangerang** (hosts); 23. (Jakarta) ASIOP; 24. Persitara North Jakarta; 25. (West Java) Persipu; 26. (West Java) **Persipasi Kota Bekasi** (hosts); 27. (West Java) **Persikasi Bekasi**; 28. (West Java) **Persika 1951** (hosts); 29. (West Java) Persipo Purwakarta; 30. (West Java) **Persikas Subang** (hosts); 31. (West Kalimantan) Kalbar United; 32. (West Kalimantan) Persikat Ketapang	33. (West Java) **Dejan** (hosts); 34. (West Java) PS Cimahi Putra; 35. (West Java) Persigar Garut (hosts); 36. (West Java) **PSGC Ciamis** (hosts); 37. (Central Java) Persab Brebes; 38. (Central Java) **Persip Pekalongan** (hosts); 39. (Central Java) **Persibangga Purbalingga**; 40. (Central Java) PSIW Wonosobo; 41. (Central Java) **PSDB United** (hosts); 42. (Central Java) **Persiku Kudus** (hosts); 43. (Central Java) PSIK Klaten; 44. (Special Region of Yogyakarta) **Persiba Bantul** (hosts); 45. (Special Region of Yogyakarta) **PS HW UMY** (hosts); 46. (South Kalimantan) Persetala Tanah Laut; 47. (South Kalimantan) PS Kab. Tapin; 48. (South Kalimantan) PS Talenta Banua	49. (Central Java) **Universitas Surakarta**; 50. (East Java) **PSM Madiun**; 51. (East Java) **Persedikab Kediri** (hosts); 52. (East Java) **Persibo Bojonegoro** (hosts); 53. (East Java) **Persekabpas Pasuruan** (hosts); 54. (East Java) Pasuruan United; 55. (East Java) **NZR Sumbersari** (hosts); 56. (East Kalimantan) **Kartanegara (Mesra)**; 57. (East Kalimantan) Caladium; 58. (Bali) Perseden Denpasar; 59. (Bali) ~~Singaraja ZFP~~ (withdrew); 60. (Bali) PS Putra Angkasa Kapal; 61. (West Nusa Tenggara) PS Mataram; 62. (East Nusa Tenggara) Perse Ende; 63. (East Nusa Tenggara) PSN Ngada; 64. (West Sulawesi) PS Polmas	65. (South Sulawesi) Persibone Bone; 66. (South Sulawesi) Mangiwang; 67. (South Sulawesi) Persim Maros; 68. (South Sulawesi) QDR; 69. (Southeast Sulawesi) **UHO MZF**; 70. (Central Sulawesi) Persipal Palu Youth; 71. (Central Sulawesi) Bandar Sulteng; 72. Persidago Gorontalo; 73. (Gorontalo) PS Boalemo; 74. (North Sulawesi) Persmin Minahasa; 75. (Maluku (province)) ~~Maluku~~ (withdrew); 76. (Maluku (province)) PS Pelauw Putra; 77. (North Maluku) Morotai United; 78. (West Papua (province)) Persegaf Arfak Mountains; 79. (Central Papua) **Persipani Paniai**; 80. (Central Papua) **Waanal Brothers**

Note: Bolded teams qualified for the second round.

=== Group A ===
All matches were held at Benteng Reborn Stadium, Tangerang.

Pos	Team	Pld	W	D	L	GF	GA	GD	Pts	Qualification
1	(Banten) Persikota (H)	4	3	1	0	10	2	+8	**10**	Advance to the second round
2	(East Kalimantan) Kartanegara (Mesra)	4	2	1	1	5	2	+3	**7**	Advance to the second round
3	(Central Java) Persab	4	1	3	0	5	3	+2	**6**	
4	(Riau Islands) MBS United	4	1	0	3	5	10	−5	**3**	
5	(Gorontalo) Persidago	4	0	1	3	3	11	−8	**1**	

Source: PSSI
Rules for classification: 1) Points; 2) Head-to-head points; 3) Head-to-head goal difference; 4) Head-to-head goals scored; 5) Goal difference; 6) Goals scored; 7) Fair-play points; 8) Draw.
(H) Hosts

Matches

Matchday 1 (29 April)
29 April 2024
13:15 WIB (UTC+7)

Persab (Central Java)	0–0	(Banten) Persikota
	Report

Benteng Reborn Stadium, Tangerang
29 April 2024
15:30 WIB (UTC+7)

Persidago (Gorontalo)	1–2	(East Kalimantan) Kartanegara (Mesra)
Firman Botutihe 74'	Report	Razzu Andika 27' 65'

Benteng Reborn Stadium, Tangerang

Matchday 2 (1 May)
1 May 2024
13:15 WIB (UTC+7)

Kartanegara (Mesra) (East Kalimantan)	3–0	(Riau Islands) MBS United
Gufran 37'; Choirul Anam 43'; Razzu Andika 88'	Report

Benteng Reborn Stadium, Tangerang
1 May 2024
15:30 WIB (UTC+7)

Persidago (Gorontalo)	2–2	(Central Java) Persab
Ismail Adam 54' 90+6'	Report	Ahmad Bilal 16'; Arjun Ardianto 39'

Benteng Reborn Stadium, Tangerang

Matchday 3 (3 May)
3 May 2024
13:30 WIB (UTC+7)

MBS United (Riau Islands)	2–0	(Gorontalo) Persidago
Andi 3'; Febri Maulana 75'	Report

Benteng Reborn Stadium, Tangerang
3 May 2024
15:30 WIB (UTC+7)

Persikota (Banten)	1–0	(East Kalimantan) Kartanegara (Mesra)
Zidane Putra 64'	Report

Benteng Reborn Stadium, Tangerang

Matchday 4 (5 May)
5 May 2024
13:15 WIB (UTC+7)

Persikota (Banten)	5–0	(Gorontalo) Persidago
Azka Fauzi; Luthfi El Hakim; Indra Adiansyah; Hafidz Bawaqi	Report

Benteng Reborn Stadium, Tangerang
5 May 2024
15:30 WIB (UTC+7)

Persab (Central Java)	3–1	(Riau Islands) MBS United
Mashori 7'; Renaldi Malo Pinda 52' 53'	Report	Andi 90+2'

Benteng Reborn Stadium, Tangerang

Matchday 5 (7 May)
7 May 2024
13:15 WIB (UTC+7)

Kartanegara (Mesra) (East Kalimantan)	0–0	(Central Java) Persab
	Report

Benteng Reborn Stadium, Tangerang
7 May 2024
15:30 WIB (UTC+7)

MBS United (Riau Islands)	2–4	(Banten) Persikota
Putra 16'; Nanang Suprianto 36'	Report	Yehezkiel Hilkia 12' 59'; Luthfi El Hakim 33'; Azka Fauzi 79'

Benteng Reborn Stadium, Tangerang

=== Group B ===
All matches were held at Cibinong Mini Stadium, Bogor Regency.

Pos	Team	Pld	W	D	L	GF	GA	GD	Pts	Qualification
1	(West Java) Persipasi (H)	4	3	0	1	6	3	+3	**9**	Advance to the second round
2	(Riau) Tornado	4	2	1	1	6	2	+4	**7 (Note: Tied on head-to-head record. So the overall goal difference rule is applied: Tornado +4, PS Mataram +2.)**	Advance to the second round
3	(West Nusa Tenggara) PS Mataram	4	2	1	1	5	3	+2	**7**	
4	(North Maluku) Morotai United	4	2	0	2	3	4	−1	**6**	
5	(South Kalimantan) PS Kab. Tapin	4	0	0	4	0	8	−8	**0**	

Source: PSSI
Rules for classification: 1) Points; 2) Head-to-head points; 3) Head-to-head goal difference; 4) Head-to-head goals scored; 5) Goal difference; 6) Goals scored; 7) Fair-play points; 8) Draw.
(H) Hosts
Notes:

Matches

Matchday 1 (29 April)
29 April 2024
13:15 WIB (UTC+7)

PS Kab. Tapin (South Kalimantan)	0–1	(West Java) Persipasi
	Report	M. Adam Malik 27'

Cibinong Mini Stadium, Bogor Regency
29 April 2024
15:30 WIB (UTC+7)

Morotai United (North Maluku)	0–1	(West Nusa Tenggara) PS Mataram
	Report	47'

Cibinong Mini Stadium, Bogor Regency

Matchday 2 (1 May)
1 May 2024
13:15 WIB (UTC+7)

PS Mataram (West Nusa Tenggara)	1–1	(Riau) Tornado
M. Rifki 55'	Report	Ali Ichsan 82'

Cibinong Mini Stadium, Bogor Regency
1 May 2024
15:30 WIB (UTC+7)

Morotai United (North Maluku)	1–0	(South Kalimantan) PS Kab. Tapin
Ridho Syahdan 73'	Report

Cibinong Mini Stadium, Bogor Regency

Matchday 3 (3 May)
3 May 2024
13:30 WIB (UTC+7)

Tornado (Riau)	0–1	(North Maluku) Morotai United
	Report	Ariel Kurung 45+3'

Cibinong Mini Stadium, Bogor Regency
3 May 2024
15:30 WIB (UTC+7)

Persipasi (West Java)	2–0	(West Nusa Tenggara) PS Mataram
M. Farid Maulana 33'; Ardantyo Gilang 90+3'	Report

Cibinong Mini Stadium, Bogor Regency

Matchday 4 (5 May)
5 May 2024
13:15 WIB (UTC+7)

Persipasi (West Java)	3–1	(North Maluku) Morotai United
M. Farid Maulana 32'; Sandi Prasetya 52' 70'	Report	Masrul Bahri 54'

Cibinong Mini Stadium, Bogor Regency
5 May 2024
15:30 WIB (UTC+7)

PS Kab. Tapin (South Kalimantan)	0–3	(Riau) Tornado
	Report	Vendra Aprilianda 45+3' (pen.); Ali Ichsan 52' 79'

Cibinong Mini Stadium, Bogor Regency

Matchday 5 (7 May)
7 May 2024
13:15 WIB (UTC+7)

PS Mataram (West Nusa Tenggara)	3–0	(South Kalimantan) PS Kab. Tapin
Fauzan 10'; Junarsih 33'; Iqbal Eriandi 87'	Report

Cibinong Mini Stadium, Bogor Regency
7 May 2024
15:30 WIB (UTC+7)

Tornado (Riau)	2–0	(West Java) Persipasi
Daniel Ponsecca 8'; Ali Ichsan 45+1'	Report

Cibinong Mini Stadium, Bogor Regency

=== Group C ===
All matches were held at Singaperbangsa Stadium, Karawang Regency and Purnawarman Stadium, Purwakarta Regency.

Pos	Team	Pld	W	D	L	GF	GA	GD	Pts	Qualification
1	(West Java) Persika 1951 (H)	3	2	1	0	9	2	+7	**7**	Advance to the second round
2	(Riau) PS Siak	3	1	2	0	5	4	+1	**5**	Advance to the second round
3	(West Java) PS Cimahi Putra	3	1	1	1	8	3	+5	**4**	
4	(Gorontalo) PS Boalemo	3	0	0	3	4	17	−13	**0**	
5	(Bali) Singaraja ZFP	0	0	0	0	0	0	0	**0**	Withdrew

Source: PSSI
Rules for classification: 1) Points; 2) Head-to-head points; 3) Head-to-head goal difference; 4) Head-to-head goals scored; 5) Goal difference; 6) Goals scored; 7) Fair-play points; 8) Draw.
(H) Hosts

Matches

Matchday 1 (29 April)
29 April 2024
13:15 WIB (UTC+7)

PS Siak (Riau)	3–2	(Gorontalo) PS Boalemo
M. Bima 55'; Rahmat Fadillah 63'; Yovi Rahmadan 68'	Report	Yusuf Hippy 47'; Agil Prasetya 56'

Singaperbangsa Stadium, Karawang Regency
29 April 2024
15:30 WIB (UTC+7)

Persika 1951 (West Java)	1–0	(West Java) PS Cimahi Putra
Bagas Rizky 28'	Report

Singaperbangsa Stadium, Karawang Regency

Matchday 2 (1 May)
1 May 2024
13:15 WIB (UTC+7)

PS Boalemo (Gorontalo)	1–7	(West Java) Persika 1951
M. Firmansyah 85'	Report	Bagas Rizky 11' 23'; Galih A. 46' 56' 73'; Ahmad Gunawan 50'; Hoji Saputra 83'

Singaperbangsa Stadium, Karawang Regency
1 May 2024
15:30 WIB (UTC+7)

PS Cimahi Putra (West Java)	1–1	(Riau) PS Siak
Deka Muhammad Toha 32'	Report	Putra Wulan 34'

Singaperbangsa Stadium, Karawang Regency

Matchday 3 (3 May)
3 May 2024
15:30 WIB (UTC+7)

PS Siak (Riau)	1–1	(West Java) Persika 1951
Randy Syahputra 32'	Report	Alvin Haryanto 21'

Singaperbangsa Stadium, Karawang Regency
3 May 2024
15:30 WIB (UTC+7)

PS Cimahi Putra (West Java)	7–1	(Gorontalo) PS Boalemo
	Report

Purnawarman Stadium, Purwakarta Regency

=== Group D ===
All matches were held at Persikas Stadium and Lodaya Stadium, Subang Regency.

Pos	Team	Pld	W	D	L	GF	GA	GD	Pts	Qualification
1	(West Java) Persikas (H)	3	3	0	0	11	5	+6	**9**	Advance to the second round
2	(Central Java) Persibangga	3	2	0	1	8	5	+3	**6**	Advance to the second round
3	(North Sumatra) PS PTPN III	3	1	0	2	6	8	−2	**3**	
4	(East Kalimantan) Caladium	3	0	0	3	3	10	−7	**0**	
5	(Maluku (province)) Maluku	0	0	0	0	0	0	0	**0**	Withdrew

Source: PSSI
Rules for classification: 1) Points; 2) Head-to-head points; 3) Head-to-head goal difference; 4) Head-to-head goals scored; 5) Goal difference; 6) Goals scored; 7) Fair-play points; 8) Draw.
(H) Hosts

Matches

Matchday 1 (29 April)
29 April 2024
13:15 WIB (UTC+7)

PS PTPN III (North Sumatra)	2–1	(East Kalimantan) Caladium
M. Ghifarul 4'; Fadli Reza 50'	Report	M. Yusup 89'

Persikas Stadium, Subang Regency
29 April 2024
15:30 WIB (UTC+7)

Persikas (West Java)	3–1	(Central Java) Persibangga
Ega Nugraha 21' 31'; Andi Ramadana 66'	Report	M. Rizqi 48'

Persikas Stadium, Subang Regency

Matchday 2 (1 May)
1 May 2024
13:15 WIB (UTC+7)

Caladium (West Java)	2–5	(East Kalimantan) Persikas
M. Yusuf 35' 66'	Report	Tegar Afrianto 7'; Fardhan Faris 26'; Ega Nugraha 55' 69'; Rizki Firmansah 80'

Persikas Stadium, Subang Regency
1 May 2024
15:30 WIB (UTC+7)

Persibangga (Central Java)	4–2	(North Sumatra) PS PTPN III
M. Rizki 19' 40'; Andri Aprianto 52'; Wida Ariadi 54'	Report	Alwan Alfarizi 30'; Aditya Putra 60'

Persikas Stadium, Subang Regency

Matchday 3 (3 May)
3 May 2024
15:30 WIB (UTC+7)

PS PTPN III (North Sumatra)	2–3	(West Java) Persikas
Hendri 78' (o.g.); Aditya Putra 86'	Report	Andi Ramadana 1' 24'; Rizki Firmansah 53'

Persikas Stadium, Subang Regency
3 May 2024
15:30 WIB (UTC+7)

Persibangga (Central Java)	3–0	(East Kalimantan) Caladium
Rizky Fauzan; Afif; Wida Ariadi	Report

Lodaya Stadium, Subang Regency

=== Group E ===
All matches were held at Siliwangi Stadium, Bandung.

Pos	Team	Pld	W	D	L	GF	GA	GD	Pts	Qualification
1	(West Java) Dejan (H)	4	3	1	0	16	3	+13	**10**	Advance to the second round
2	(South Sumatra) PS Palembang	4	2	1	1	4	7	−3	**7**	Advance to the second round
3	(East Nusa Tenggara) Perse	4	1	3	0	11	8	+3	**6**	
4	(Lampung) TS Saiburai	4	1	0	3	7	11	−4	**3**	
5	(Maluku (province)) PS Pelauw Putra (Note: PS Pelauw Putra were deducted six points by the PSSI Disciplinary Committee.)	4	0	1	3	5	14	−9	**−5**	

Source: PSSI
Rules for classification: 1) Points; 2) Head-to-head points; 3) Head-to-head goal difference; 4) Head-to-head goals scored; 5) Goal difference; 6) Goals scored; 7) Fair-play points; 8) Draw.
(H) Hosts
Notes:

Matches

Matchday 1 (29 April)
29 April 2024
13:15 WIB (UTC+7)

Dejan (West Java)	3–0	(Lampung) TS Saiburai
Andi Shopian 52'; Wawan Sumadi 57'; M. Rafly Aziz 90+3'	Report

Siliwangi Stadium, Bandung
29 April 2024
15:30 WIB (UTC+7)

PS Pelauw Putra (Maluku (province))	3–3	(East Nusa Tenggara) Perse
Dani Maulana 36'; Ridwan 52'; Saiful 57'	Report	Fandy Tanauma 8'; Adi Aba 84' (pen.); Indra Woda 90+1'

Siliwangi Stadium, Bandung

Matchday 2 (1 May)
1 May 2024
13:15 WIB (UTC+7)

Perse (East Nusa Tenggara)	0–0	(South Sumatra) PS Palembang
	Report

Siliwangi Stadium, Bandung
1 May 2024
15:30 WIB (UTC+7)

PS Pelauw Putra (Maluku (province))	0–5	(West Java) Dejan
	Report	Riski Ramadhan 6' 41'; Andi Shopian 16'; M. Rafly Aziz 29'; M. Bimazawawi 90+1'

Siliwangi Stadium, Bandung

Matchday 3 (3 May)
3 May 2024
13:30 WIB (UTC+7)

PS Palembang (South Sumatra)	2–1	(Maluku (province)) PS Pelauw Putra
Maryono 38'; Alif Rayhan 90+2'	Report	Miftahul 7'

Siliwangi Stadium, Bandung
3 May 2024
15:30 WIB (UTC+7)

TS Saiburai (Lampung)	2–5	(East Nusa Tenggara) Perse
Qory Rafsanjani 16'; Aan Dani 28'	Report	Jainal Muhammad 7' 9'; Adi Aba 13'; Fandy Tanauma 30'; Deni Seran 66' (pen.)

Siliwangi Stadium, Bandung

Matchday 4 (5 May)
5 May 2024
13:15 WIB (UTC+7)

TS Saiburai (Lampung)	4–1	(Maluku (province)) PS Pelauw Putra
Andre Putra 2'; Rambe 19' 27' (pen.); Aan Dani 80'	Report	Amir Tuasikal 45+1'

Siliwangi Stadium, Bandung
5 May 2024
15:30 WIB (UTC+7)

Dejan (West Java)	5–0	(South Sumatra) PS Palembang
M. Raffi Thalib 28'; Rakha Shabir 30'; Andi Shopian 37'; Aray Suhendri 77'; Afif Fathoni 89' (pen.)	Report

Siliwangi Stadium, Bandung

Matchday 5 (7 May)
7 May 2024
13:15 WIB (UTC+7)

Perse (East Nusa Tenggara)	3–3	(West Java) Dejan
Jainal Muhammad 5'; Servin 9'; Fandy Tanauma 63'	Report	Fauzan Nabil 61'; Wawan Sumadi 71'; Aray Suhendri 76'

Siliwangi Stadium, Bandung
7 May 2024
15:30 WIB (UTC+7)

PS Palembang (South Sumatra)	2–1	(Lampung) TS Saiburai
Malik Irzan Alhadad 75'; Dheco Zacky 83'	Report	Imron Tubagus Sidik 69'

Siliwangi Stadium, Bandung

=== Group F ===
All matches were held at R.A.A. Adiwijaya Stadium, Garut Regency.

Pos	Team	Pld	W	D	L	GF	GA	GD	Pts	Qualification
1	(Central Papua) Persipani	4	2	2	0	11	4	+7	**8 (Note: Tied on head-to-head record. So the overall goal difference rule is applied: Persipani +7, Persikasi +5, Pasuruan United +5. For Persikasi and Pasuruan United, as they are tied on overall goal difference, the overall goals scored rule is applied: Persikasi 10, Pasuruan United 8.)**	Advance to the second round
2	(West Java) Persikasi	4	2	2	0	10	5	+5	**8**	Advance to the second round
3	(East Java) Pasuruan United	4	2	2	0	8	3	+5	**8**	
4	(West Java) Persigar (H)	4	1	0	3	6	9	−3	**3**	
5	(Aceh) PSAB	4	0	0	4	2	16	−14	**0**	

Source: PSSI
Rules for classification: 1) Points; 2) Head-to-head points; 3) Head-to-head goal difference; 4) Head-to-head goals scored; 5) Goal difference; 6) Goals scored; 7) Fair-play points; 8) Draw.
(H) Hosts
Notes:

Matches

Matchday 1 (29 April)
29 April 2024
13:15 WIB (UTC+7)

Persigar (West Java)	2–3	(West Java) Persikasi
Yogi Hartono 12' 25'	Report	2'; Nanda Mahing 80'; 85'

R.A.A. Adiwijaya Stadium, Garut Regency
29 April 2024
15:30 WIB (UTC+7)

Persipani (Central Papua)	1–1	(East Java) Pasuruan United
	Report

R.A.A. Adiwijaya Stadium, Garut Regency

Matchday 2 (1 May)
1 May 2024
13:15 WIB (UTC+7)

Pasuruan United (East Java)	4–1	(Aceh) PSAB
Mahdi 4'; M. Nur Haqiqi 7' 33'; Shadam 45+1'	Report	Luthfi Fauzi 40' (pen.)

R.A.A. Adiwijaya Stadium, Garut Regency
1 May 2024
15:30 WIB (UTC+7)

Persipani (Central Papua)	4–2	(West Java) Persigar
Daniel Wonda 19' 79'; Eduardo 62' 90+4'	Report	Salman Farisi 6'; Yogi Hartono 42'

R.A.A. Adiwijaya Stadium, Garut Regency

Matchday 3 (3 May)
3 May 2024
13:30 WIB (UTC+7)

PSAB (Aceh)	0–5	(Central Papua) Persipani
	Report	Alberto Yumame 12' 43'; Daniel Wonda 67'; Roberto Sauyai 80' 90+1'

R.A.A. Adiwijaya Stadium, Garut Regency
3 May 2024
15:30 WIB (UTC+7)

Persikasi (West Java)	1–1	(East Java) Pasuruan United
79'	Report	Arfanda Rahman 51'

R.A.A. Adiwijaya Stadium, Garut Regency

Matchday 4 (5 May)
5 May 2024
13:15 WIB (UTC+7)

Persikasi (West Java)	1–1	(Central Papua) Persipani
Azkia Halim 11'	Report	Yulyan 90+4'

R.A.A. Adiwijaya Stadium, Garut Regency
5 May 2024
15:30 WIB (UTC+7)

Persigar (West Java)	2–0	(Aceh) PSAB
Yogi Hartono 66'; Salman Farisi 76'	Report

R.A.A. Adiwijaya Stadium, Garut Regency

Matchday 5 (7 May)
7 May 2024
13:15 WIB (UTC+7)

Pasuruan United (East Java)	2–0	(West Java) Persigar
Irfan Fikri 33'; M. Nur Haqiqi 52' (pen.)	Report

R.A.A. Adiwijaya Stadium, Garut Regency
7 May 2024
15:30 WIB (UTC+7)

PSAB (Aceh)	1–5	(West Java) Persikasi
Fazullah 7'	Report	own goal 34'; Hafid 39'; Raka 75'; Farhan 81' 88' (pen.)

R.A.A. Adiwijaya Stadium, Garut Regency

=== Group G ===
All matches were held at Galuh Stadium, Ciamis Regency.

Pos	Team	Pld	W	D	L	GF	GA	GD	Pts	Qualification
1	(West Java) PSGC (H)	4	3	0	1	8	3	+5	**9 (Note: Head-to-head result: PSGC 3–1 Labura Hebat.)**	Advance to the second round
2	(North Sumatra) Labura Hebat	4	3	0	1	8	3	+5	**9**	Advance to the second round
3	(Bali) Perseden	4	2	1	1	8	2	+6	**7**	
4	(Jakarta) Persitara	4	1	1	2	9	10	−1	**4**	
5	(South Sulawesi) Persim	4	0	0	4	2	17	−15	**0**	

Source: PSSI
Rules for classification: 1) Points; 2) Head-to-head points; 3) Head-to-head goal difference; 4) Head-to-head goals scored; 5) Goal difference; 6) Goals scored; 7) Fair-play points; 8) Draw.
(H) Hosts
Notes:

Matches

Matchday 1 (29 April)
29 April 2024
13:15 WIB (UTC+7)

PSGC (West Java)	3–1	(Jakarta) Persitara
Rahmat Risky 16'; Gunawan Prasojo 21'; M. Javan Mahendra 69'	Report	Kelvin 19'

Galuh Stadium, Ciamis Regency
29 April 2024
15:30 WIB (UTC+7)

Persim (South Sulawesi)	0–6	(Bali) Perseden
	Report	Kadek Prasetya 24'; Sulendra 34'; I Made Anta Wijaya 55' 82'; Galih Yoga Prasetya 74'; Roland Yeremia 87'

Galuh Stadium, Ciamis Regency

Matchday 2 (1 May)
1 May 2024
13:15 WIB (UTC+7)

Perseden (Bali)	0–1	(North Sumatra) Labura Hebat
	Report	M. Alvin Dwiguna 75'

Galuh Stadium, Ciamis Regency
1 May 2024
15:30 WIB (UTC+7)

Persim (South Sulawesi)	0–2	(West Java) PSGC
	Report	Denia Nur Fadilah 6'; Ganjar Kurniawan 62'

Galuh Stadium, Ciamis Regency

Matchday 3 (3 May)
3 May 2024
13:30 WIB (UTC+7)

Labura Hebat (North Sumatra)	2–0	(South Sulawesi) Persim
Eki Fauzi Saputra 14'; M. Alvin Dwiguna 60' (pen.)	Report

Galuh Stadium, Ciamis Regency
3 May 2024
15:30 WIB (UTC+7)

Persitara (Jakarta)	1–1	(Bali) Perseden
Riky Harry 78'	Report	Roland Yeremia 43'

Galuh Stadium, Ciamis Regency

Matchday 4 (5 May)
5 May 2024
13:15 WIB (UTC+7)

Persitara (Jakarta)	7–2	(South Sulawesi) Persim
Ahmad Sainal 16' 69'; Michael Latuheru 45+2'; M. Daffa 66' 68'; John Cliff 81' 90+4'	Report	Surah Adrian 29'; Fadli Pramana 58'

Galuh Stadium, Ciamis Regency
5 May 2024
15:30 WIB (UTC+7)

PSGC (West Java)	3–1	(North Sumatra) Labura Hebat
Ganjar K. 37' (pen.) 51' 70'	Report	Eki Fauzi 22'

Galuh Stadium, Ciamis Regency

Matchday 5 (7 May)
7 May 2024
13:15 WIB (UTC+7)

Perseden (Bali)	1–0	(West Java) PSGC
Roland Yeremia 11'	Report

Galuh Stadium, Ciamis Regency
7 May 2024
15:30 WIB (UTC+7)

Labura Hebat (North Sumatra)	4–0	(Jakarta) Persitara
M. Alvin Dwiguna 31' 43'; Eki Fauzi 51'; Nico 56'	Report

Galuh Stadium, Ciamis Regency

=== Group H ===
All matches were held at Hoegeng Stadium, Pekalongan.

Pos	Team	Pld	W	D	L	GF	GA	GD	Pts	Qualification
1	(Central Papua) Waanal Brothers	4	2	2	0	9	4	+5	**8**	Advance to the second round
2	(Central Java) Persip (H)	4	2	1	1	8	4	+4	**7**	Advance to the second round
3	(East Nusa Tenggara) PSN	4	1	3	0	6	4	+2	**6**	
4	(Jakarta) ASIOP	4	0	3	1	8	9	−1	**3**	
5	(Aceh) PSBL	4	0	1	3	3	13	−10	**1**	

Source: PSSI
Rules for classification: 1) Points; 2) Head-to-head points; 3) Head-to-head goal difference; 4) Head-to-head goals scored; 5) Goal difference; 6) Goals scored; 7) Fair-play points; 8) Draw.
(H) Hosts

Matches

Matchday 1 (29 April)
29 April 2024
13:15 WIB (UTC+7)

Persip (Central Java)	3–2	(Jakarta) ASIOP
Haidar Nur Afif 14' 28'; Shahih Rishandy 34' (pen.)	Report	Ibrahim Faisal 22'; Vieri Ariyanto 42'

Hoegeng Stadium, Pekalongan
29 April 2024
15:30 WIB (UTC+7)

Waanal Brothers (Central Papua)	2–2	(East Nusa Tenggara) PSN
M. Bahari Kurniawan 47'; Dimas Gumilang 76'	Report	Yohannes Nono 22'; Wilbrodus Nono 65'

Hoegeng Stadium, Pekalongan

Matchday 2 (1 May)
1 May 2024
13:15 WIB (UTC+7)

PSN (East Nusa Tenggara)	2–0	(Aceh) PSBL
Alfianus Seo 21'; Yohannes Nono 33'	Report

Hoegeng Stadium, Pekalongan
1 May 2024
15:30 WIB (UTC+7)

Waanal Brothers (Central Papua)	1–0	(Central Java) Persip
M. Bahari Kurniawan 45'	Report

Hoegeng Stadium, Pekalongan

Matchday 3 (3 May)
3 May 2024
13:30 WIB (UTC+7)

PSBL (Aceh)	0–4	(Central Papua) Waanal Brothers
	Report	Dimas Gumilang 9'; Dwi Cahyono 54' 56'; Alsa Kiat 59'

Hoegeng Stadium, Pekalongan
3 May 2024
15:30 WIB (UTC+7)

ASIOP (Jakarta)	1–1	(East Nusa Tenggara) PSN
Airlangga Sutjipto 72'	Report	Evodius Milo 75'

Hoegeng Stadium, Pekalongan

Matchday 4 (5 May)
5 May 2024
13:15 WIB (UTC+7)

ASIOP (Jakarta)	2–2	(Central Papua) Waanal Brothers
Muhlis 47'; M. Dharma Saputra 55'	Report	Dwi Cahyono 58'; M. Bahari Kurniawan 90+5'

Hoegeng Stadium, Pekalongan
5 May 2024
15:30 WIB (UTC+7)

Persip (Central Java)	4–0	(Aceh) PSBL
Shahih Rishandy 2' 28' 37'; M. Faris Nurcahyadi 31'	Report

Hoegeng Stadium, Pekalongan

Matchday 5 (7 May)
7 May 2024
13:15 WIB (UTC+7)

PSN (East Nusa Tenggara)	1–1	(Central Java) Persip
Kristoforus Nono 82' (pen.)	Report	Shahih Rishandy 23'

Hoegeng Stadium, Pekalongan
7 May 2024
15:30 WIB (UTC+7)

PSBL (Aceh)	3–3	(Jakarta) ASIOP
Agung Maulana 15'; Mudasir 17'; Aidil 84'	Report	Airlangga Sutjipto 46'; Ibrahim Faisal 62' 79'

Hoegeng Stadium, Pekalongan

=== Group I ===
All matches were held at Wergu Wetan Stadium, Kudus Regency.

Pos	Team	Pld	W	D	L	GF	GA	GD	Pts	Qualification
1	(Central Java) Persiku (H)	4	4	0	0	10	2	+8	**12**	Advance to the second round
2	(Riau Islands) 757 Kepri Jaya	4	2	1	1	7	6	+1	**7**	Advance to the second round
3	(West Sulawesi) PS Polmas	4	1	2	1	6	6	0	**5**	
4	(West Java) Persipu	4	1	1	2	4	6	−2	**4**	
5	(Central Sulawesi) Persipal Youth	4	0	0	4	5	12	−7	**0**	

Source: PSSI
Rules for classification: 1) Points; 2) Head-to-head points; 3) Head-to-head goal difference; 4) Head-to-head goals scored; 5) Goal difference; 6) Goals scored; 7) Fair-play points; 8) Draw.
(H) Hosts

Matches

Matchday 1 (30 April)
30 April 2024
13:15 WIB (UTC+7)

Persiku (Central Java)	3–1	(West Java) Persipu
Yola Angoro 42' 45+2' 56'	Report	Ryanata Yoga 60' (pen.)

Wergu Wetan Stadium, Kudus Regency
30 April 2024
15:30 WIB (UTC+7)

Persipal Youth (Central Sulawesi)	2–3	(West Sulawesi) PS Polmas
M. Alip Rahmat 17'; Muhammad Rozi 60'	Report	Ferdiansyah 39' (pen.) 83' (pen.); Yusrifal 55'

Wergu Wetan Stadium, Kudus Regency

Matchday 2 (2 May)
2 May 2024
13:15 WIB (UTC+7)

PS Polmas (West Sulawesi)	2–2	(Riau Islands) 757 Kepri Jaya
Rofan Al Hakim 14'; Dandi 34'	Report	Juret 57'; Ronan Wibisono 85'

Wergu Wetan Stadium, Kudus Regency
2 May 2024
15:30 WIB (UTC+7)

Persipal Youth (Central Sulawesi)	0–4	(Central Java) Persiku
	Report	Dheo Budi 47'; Hasbullah Kader 66' 74' 85'

Wergu Wetan Stadium, Kudus Regency

Matchday 3 (4 May)
4 May 2024
13:15 WIB (UTC+7)

757 Kepri Jaya (Riau Islands)	3–2	(Central Sulawesi) Persipal Youth
Juret Alkaukabadury 13' 82'; M. Syahril 31'	Report	Mohammad Razy 47'; M. Rifky 77'

Wergu Wetan Stadium, Kudus Regency
4 May 2024
15:30 WIB (UTC+7)

Persipu (West Java)	1–1	(West Sulawesi) PS Polmas
Renaldy Febrian 84'	Report	Lukman Al Hakim 64'

Wergu Wetan Stadium, Kudus Regency

Matchday 4 (6 May)
6 May 2024
13:15 WIB (UTC+7)

Persipu (West Java)	2–1	(Central Sulawesi) Persipal Youth
Ilham Ainurroffie 20'; Muhammad Arif 64'	Report	Cevin Gloria 84'

Wergu Wetan Stadium, Kudus Regency
6 May 2024
15:30 WIB (UTC+7)

Persiku (Central Java)	2–1	(Riau Islands) 757 Kepri Jaya
Dheo Budi 44'; Sholihul 90+2' (pen.)	Report	Galih Akbar 80'

Wergu Wetan Stadium, Kudus Regency

Matchday 5 (8 May)
8 May 2024
13:15 WIB (UTC+7)

PS Polmas (West Sulawesi)	0–1	(Central Java) Persiku
	Report	Yola Angoro 30'

Wergu Wetan Stadium, Kudus Regency
8 May 2024
15:30 WIB (UTC+7)

757 Kepri Jaya (Riau Islands)	1–0	(West Java) Persipu
Ronan Wibisono 20' (pen.)	Report

Wergu Wetan Stadium, Kudus Regency

=== Group J ===
All matches were held at Sultan Fatah Stadium, Demak Regency.

Pos	Team	Pld	W	D	L	GF	GA	GD	Pts	Qualification
1	(Central Java) PSDB United (H)	4	3	1	0	15	5	+10	**10**	Advance to the second round
2	(Central Java) Universitas Surakarta	4	2	1	1	5	6	−1	**7**	Advance to the second round
3	(Aceh) Persidi	4	2	0	2	6	6	0	**6**	
4	(West Papua (province)) Persegaf	4	1	2	1	11	7	+4	**5**	
5	(West Java) Persipo	4	0	0	4	2	15	−13	**0**	

Source: PSSI
Rules for classification: 1) Points; 2) Head-to-head points; 3) Head-to-head goal difference; 4) Head-to-head goals scored; 5) Goal difference; 6) Goals scored; 7) Fair-play points; 8) Draw.
(H) Hosts

Matches

Matchday 1 (30 April)
30 April 2024
13:15 WIB (UTC+7)

PSDB United (Central Java)	6–1	(West Java) Persipo
Ayuep Yulianto 3'; Johan Yoga Utama 29'; M. Khoirul Anam 49'; Joyan Affan Al Ghony 51'; Henry Setiawan 87'; Alsyah Fradana 90'	Report	Yopi Rizal Yunanto 38' (pen.)

Sultan Fatah Stadium, Demak Regency
30 April 2024
15:30 WIB (UTC+7)

Persegaf (West Papua (province))	3–3	(Central Java) Universitas Surakarta
Thomas Kluivert Karubaba 28'; Yusua Kalep Naa 47'; John Gotlief Rumbruren 64'	Report	Isnaini Aulia Sabil 45+1' 75' 86'

Sultan Fatah Stadium, Demak Regency

Matchday 2 (2 May)
2 May 2024
13:15 WIB (UTC+7)

Universitas Surakarta (Central Java)	1–0	(Aceh) Persidi
Aji Eko Sulistiono 43'	Report

Sultan Fatah Stadium, Demak Regency
2 May 2024
15:30 WIB (UTC+7)

Persegaf (West Papua (province))	2–2	(Central Java) PSDB United
John Gotlief Rumbruren 40'; Yusua Kalep Naa 43'	Report	Radya Cavalera 26'; M. Khoirul Anam 67'

Sultan Fatah Stadium, Demak Regency

Matchday 3 (4 May)
4 May 2024
13:15 WIB (UTC+7)

Persidi (Aceh)	2–0	(West Papua (province)) Persegaf
Haikal Khalil 7'; Saifuddin 14'	Report

Sultan Fatah Stadium, Demak Regency
4 May 2024
15:30 WIB (UTC+7)

Persipo (West Java)	0–1	(Central Java) Universitas Surakarta
	Report	Aji Eko Sulistiono 84' (pen.)

Sultan Fatah Stadium, Demak Regency

Matchday 4 (6 May)
6 May 2024
13:15 WIB (UTC+7)

Persipo (West Java)	0–6	(West Papua (province)) Persegaf
	Report	Yusua Kalep Naa 6' 37' 46' 72'; Maikel Kalep Antoh 64'; Mark Ryan Nihari 90+4'

Sultan Fatah Stadium, Demak Regency
6 May 2024
15:30 WIB (UTC+7)

PSDB United (Central Java)	4–2	(Aceh) Persidi
Johan Yoga Utama 14'; Ayuep Yulianto 26'; M. Khoirul Anam 48'; Daniel Nur Cahya 53'	Report	Muhammad Hafiz 42'; Rahmat Rahnadi 64'

Sultan Fatah Stadium, Demak Regency

Matchday 5 (8 May)
8 May 2024
13:15 WIB (UTC+7)

Universitas Surakarta (Central Java)	0–3	(Central Java) PSDB United
	Report	M. Khoirul Anam 10'; Radya Cavalera 40'; Anugerah Kushadi 88'

Sultan Fatah Stadium, Demak Regency
8 May 2024
15:30 WIB (UTC+7)

Persidi (Aceh)	2–1	(West Java) Persipo
Muhammad Hafiz 15'; Saifuddin 55'	Report	Agung Iskandar 47'

Sultan Fatah Stadium, Demak Regency

=== Group K ===
All matches were held at Sultan Agung Stadium, Bantul Regency.

Pos	Team	Pld	W	D	L	GF	GA	GD	Pts	Qualification
1	(Special Region of Yogyakarta) Persiba Bantul (H)	4	4	0	0	13	1	+12	**12**	Advance to the second round
2	(East Java) PSM Madiun	4	3	0	1	12	4	+8	**9**	Advance to the second round
3	(Central Sulawesi) Bandar Sulteng	4	1	1	2	3	7	−4	**4 (Note: Tied on head-to-head record. So the overall goal difference rule is applied: Bandar Sulteng −4, Persikat −7.)**	
4	(West Kalimantan) Persikat	4	1	1	2	1	8	−7	**4**	
5	(Jambi) Persebri Batanghari	4	0	0	4	2	11	−9	**0**	

Source: PSSI
Rules for classification: 1) Points; 2) Head-to-head points; 3) Head-to-head goal difference; 4) Head-to-head goals scored; 5) Goal difference; 6) Goals scored; 7) Fair-play points; 8) Draw.
(H) Hosts
Notes:

Matches

Matchday 1 (30 April)
30 April 2024
13:15 WIB (UTC+7)

Persiba Bantul (Special Region of Yogyakarta)	3–0	(West Kalimantan) Persikat
	Report

Sultan Agung Stadium, Bantul Regency
30 April 2024
15:30 WIB (UTC+7)

Bandar Sulteng (Central Sulawesi)	1–2	(East Java) PSM Madiun
	Report

Sultan Agung Stadium, Bantul Regency

Matchday 2 (2 May)
2 May 2024
13:15 WIB (UTC+7)

PSM Madiun (East Java)	5–1	(Jambi) Persebri Batanghari
	Report

Sultan Agung Stadium, Bantul Regency
2 May 2024
15:30 WIB (UTC+7)

Bandar Sulteng (Central Sulawesi)	0–5	(Special Region of Yogyakarta) Persiba Bantul
	Report

Sultan Agung Stadium, Bantul Regency

Matchday 3 (4 May)
4 May 2024
13:15 WIB (UTC+7)

Persebri Batanghari (Jambi)	0–2	(Central Sulawesi) Bandar Sulteng
	Report

Sultan Agung Stadium, Bantul Regency
4 May 2024
15:30 WIB (UTC+7)

Persikat (West Kalimantan)	0–5	(East Java) PSM Madiun
	Report

Sultan Agung Stadium, Bantul Regency

Matchday 4 (6 May)
6 May 2024
13:15 WIB (UTC+7)

Persikat (West Kalimantan)	0–0	(Central Sulawesi) Bandar Sulteng
	Report

Sultan Agung Stadium, Bantul Regency
6 May 2024
15:30 WIB (UTC+7)

Persiba Bantul (Special Region of Yogyakarta)	3–1	(Jambi) Persebri Batanghari
	Report

Sultan Agung Stadium, Bantul Regency

Matchday 5 (8 May)
8 May 2024
13:15 WIB (UTC+7)

PSM Madiun (East Java)	0–2	(Special Region of Yogyakarta) Persiba Bantul
	Report

Sultan Agung Stadium, Bantul Regency
8 May 2024
15:30 WIB (UTC+7)

Persebri Batanghari (Jambi)	0–1	(West Kalimantan) Persikat
	Report

Sultan Agung Stadium, Bantul Regency

=== Group L ===
All matches were held at Mandala Krida Stadium, Yogyakarta.

Pos	Team	Pld	W	D	L	GF	GA	GD	Pts	Qualification
1	(West Sumatra) Josal Piaman	4	3	1	0	11	5	+6	**10**	Advance to the second round
2	(Special Region of Yogyakarta) PS HW UMY (H)	4	3	0	1	7	3	+4	**9**	Advance to the second round
3	(Banten) Serpong City	4	2	0	2	5	6	−1	**6**	
4	(Bali) PS Putra Angkasa Kapal	4	1	1	2	4	7	−3	**4**	
5	(North Sulawesi) Persmin	4	0	0	4	5	11	−6	**0**	

Source: PSSI
Rules for classification: 1) Points; 2) Head-to-head points; 3) Head-to-head goal difference; 4) Head-to-head goals scored; 5) Goal difference; 6) Goals scored; 7) Fair-play points; 8) Draw.
(H) Hosts

Matches

Matchday 1 (30 April)
30 April 2024
13:15 WIB (UTC+7)

PS HW UMY (Special Region of Yogyakarta)	1–0	(Banten) Serpong City
	Report

Mandala Krida Stadium, Yogyakarta
30 April 2024
15:30 WIB (UTC+7)

Persmin (North Sulawesi)	1–2	(Bali) PS Putra Angkasa Kapal
	Report

Mandala Krida Stadium, Yogyakarta

Matchday 2 (2 May)
2 May 2024
13:15 WIB (UTC+7)

PS Putra Angkasa Kapal (Bali)	1–1	(West Sumatra) Josal Piaman
	Report

Mandala Krida Stadium, Yogyakarta
2 May 2024
15:30 WIB (UTC+7)

Persmin (North Sulawesi)	1–2	(Special Region of Yogyakarta) PS HW UMY
	Report

Mandala Krida Stadium, Yogyakarta

Matchday 3 (4 May)
4 May 2024
13:15 WIB (UTC+7)

Josal Piaman (West Sumatra)	5–2	(North Sulawesi) Persmin
	Report

Mandala Krida Stadium, Yogyakarta
4 May 2024
15:30 WIB (UTC+7)

Serpong City (Banten)	2–1	(Bali) PS Putra Angkasa Kapal
	Report

Mandala Krida Stadium, Yogyakarta

Matchday 4 (6 May)
6 May 2024
13:15 WIB (UTC+7)

Serpong City (Banten)	2–1	(North Sulawesi) Persmin
	Report

Mandala Krida Stadium, Yogyakarta
6 May 2024
15:30 WIB (UTC+7)

PS HW UMY (Special Region of Yogyakarta)	1–2	(West Sumatra) Josal Piaman
	Report

Mandala Krida Stadium, Yogyakarta

Matchday 5 (8 May)
8 May 2024
13:15 WIB (UTC+7)

PS Putra Angkasa Kapal (Bali)	0–3	(Special Region of Yogyakarta) PS HW UMY
	Report

Mandala Krida Stadium, Yogyakarta
8 May 2024
15:30 WIB (UTC+7)

Josal Piaman (West Sumatra)	3–1	(Banten) Serpong City
	Report

Mandala Krida Stadium, Yogyakarta

=== Group M ===
All matches were held at Letjen Haji Sudirman Stadium, Bojonegoro Regency.

Pos	Team	Pld	W	D	L	GF	GA	GD	Pts	Qualification
1	(East Java) Persibo (H)	4	3	1	0	9	1	+8	**10**	Advance to the second round
2	(Bengkulu) Tri Brata Rafflesia	4	2	1	1	7	5	+2	**7**	Advance to the second round
3	(Banten) Persic	4	1	2	1	6	3	+3	**5 (Note: Tied on head-to-head record. So the overall goal difference rule is applied: Persic +3, PSIW −2.)**	
4	(Central Java) PSIW	4	1	2	1	5	7	−2	**5**	
5	(South Sulawesi) QDR	4	0	0	4	1	12	−11	**0**	

Source: PSSI
Rules for classification: 1) Points; 2) Head-to-head points; 3) Head-to-head goal difference; 4) Head-to-head goals scored; 5) Goal difference; 6) Goals scored; 7) Fair-play points; 8) Draw.
(H) Hosts
Notes:

Matches

Matchday 1 (30 April)
30 April 2024
13:15 WIB (UTC+7)

PSIW (Central Java)	1–1	(Banten) Persic
	Report

Letjen Haji Sudirman Stadium, Bojonegoro Regency
30 April 2024
15:30 WIB (UTC+7)

QDR (South Sulawesi)	0–2	(East Java) Persibo
	Report

Letjen Haji Sudirman Stadium, Bojonegoro Regency

Matchday 2 (2 May)
2 May 2024
13:15 WIB (UTC+7)

Persibo (East Java)	2–1	(Bengkulu) Tri Brata Rafflesia
	Report

Letjen Haji Sudirman Stadium, Bojonegoro Regency
2 May 2024
15:30 WIB (UTC+7)

QDR (South Sulawesi)	0–3	(Central Java) PSIW
	Report

Letjen Haji Sudirman Stadium, Bojonegoro Regency

Matchday 3 (4 May)
4 May 2024
13:15 WIB (UTC+7)

Tri Brata Rafflesia (Bengkulu)	3–1	(South Sulawesi) QDR
	Report

Letjen Haji Sudirman Stadium, Bojonegoro Regency
4 May 2024
15:30 WIB (UTC+7)

Persic (Banten)	0–0	(East Java) Persibo
	Report

Letjen Haji Sudirman Stadium, Bojonegoro Regency

Matchday 4 (6 May)
6 May 2024
13:15 WIB (UTC+7)

Persic (Banten)	4–0	(South Sulawesi) QDR
	Report

Letjen Haji Sudirman Stadium, Bojonegoro Regency
6 May 2024
15:30 WIB (UTC+7)

PSIW (Central Java)	1–1	(Bengkulu) Tri Brata Rafflesia
	Report

Letjen Haji Sudirman Stadium, Bojonegoro Regency

Matchday 5 (8 May)
8 May 2024
13:15 WIB (UTC+7)

Persibo (East Java)	5–0	(Central Java) PSIW
	Report

Letjen Haji Sudirman Stadium, Bojonegoro Regency
8 May 2024
15:30 WIB (UTC+7)

Tri Brata Rafflesia (Bengkulu)	2–1	(Banten) Persic
	Report

Letjen Haji Sudirman Stadium, Bojonegoro Regency

=== Group N ===
All matches were held at R. Soedarsono Stadium, Pasuruan Regency.

Pos	Team	Pld	W	D	L	GF	GA	GD	Pts	Qualification
1	(East Java) Persekabpas (H)	4	4	0	0	12	2	+10	**12**	Advance to the second round
2	(Bangka Belitung Islands) PS Beltim	4	3	0	1	8	5	+3	**9**	Advance to the second round
3	(South Kalimantan) Persetala	4	1	1	2	7	9	−2	**4**	
4	(South Sulawesi) Mangiwang	4	0	2	2	4	8	−4	**2**	
5	(South Sumatra) Persimuba	4	0	1	3	4	11	−7	**1**	

Source: PSSI
Rules for classification: 1) Points; 2) Head-to-head points; 3) Head-to-head goal difference; 4) Head-to-head goals scored; 5) Goal difference; 6) Goals scored; 7) Fair-play points; 8) Draw.
(H) Hosts

Matches

Matchday 1 (30 April)
30 April 2024
13:15 WIB (UTC+7)

Persetala (South Kalimantan)	1–2	(Bangka Belitung Islands) PS Beltim
	Report

R. Soedarsono Stadium, Pasuruan Regency
30 April 2024
15:30 WIB (UTC+7)

Mangiwang (South Sulawesi)	0–3	(East Java) Persekabpas
	Report

R. Soedarsono Stadium, Pasuruan Regency

Matchday 2 (2 May)
2 May 2024
13:15 WIB (UTC+7)

Persekabpas (East Java)	3–1	(South Sumatra) Persimuba
	Report

R. Soedarsono Stadium, Pasuruan Regency
2 May 2024
15:30 WIB (UTC+7)

Mangiwang (South Sulawesi)	2–2	(South Kalimantan) Persetala
	Report

R. Soedarsono Stadium, Pasuruan Regency

Matchday 3 (4 May)
4 May 2024
13:15 WIB (UTC+7)

Persimuba (South Sumatra)	2–2	(South Sulawesi) Mangiwang
	Report

R. Soedarsono Stadium, Pasuruan Regency
4 May 2024
15:30 WIB (UTC+7)

PS Beltim (Bangka Belitung Islands)	0–2	(East Java) Persekabpas
	Report

R. Soedarsono Stadium, Pasuruan Regency

Matchday 4 (6 May)
6 May 2024
13:15 WIB (UTC+7)

PS Beltim (Bangka Belitung Islands)	2–1	(South Sulawesi) Mangiwang
	Report

R. Soedarsono Stadium, Pasuruan Regency
6 May 2024
15:30 WIB (UTC+7)

Persetala (South Kalimantan)	3–1	(South Sumatra) Persimuba
	Report

R. Soedarsono Stadium, Pasuruan Regency

Matchday 5 (8 May)
8 May 2024
13:15 WIB (UTC+7)

Persekabpas (East Java)	4–1	(South Kalimantan) Persetala
	Report

R. Soedarsono Stadium, Pasuruan Regency
8 May 2024
15:30 WIB (UTC+7)

Persimuba (South Sumatra)	1–4	(Bangka Belitung Islands) PS Beltim
	Report

R. Soedarsono Stadium, Pasuruan Regency

=== Group O ===
All matches were held at Canda Bhirawa Stadium, Kediri Regency.

Pos	Team	Pld	W	D	L	GF	GA	GD	Pts	Qualification
1	(Banten) Adhyaksa Farmel	4	3	1	0	14	6	+8	**10**	Advance to the second round
2	(East Java) Persedikab (H)	4	2	2	0	9	5	+4	**8**	Advance to the second round
3	(Central Java) PSIK	4	1	2	1	11	8	+3	**5**	
4	(South Sulawesi) Persibone	4	1	1	2	7	12	−5	**4**	
5	(Aceh) PS Peureulak Raya	4	0	0	4	6	16	−10	**0**	

Source: PSSI
Rules for classification: 1) Points; 2) Head-to-head points; 3) Head-to-head goal difference; 4) Head-to-head goals scored; 5) Goal difference; 6) Goals scored; 7) Fair-play points; 8) Draw.
(H) Hosts

Matches

Matchday 1 (30 April)
30 April 2024
13:15 WIB (UTC+7)

PSIK (Central Java)	2–3	(Banten) Adhyaksa Farmel
	Report

Canda Bhirawa Stadium, Kediri Regency
30 April 2024
15:30 WIB (UTC+7)

Persibone (South Sulawesi)	1–3	(East Java) Persedikab
	Report

Canda Bhirawa Stadium, Kediri Regency

Matchday 2 (2 May)
2 May 2024
13:15 WIB (UTC+7)

Persedikab (East Java)	4–2	(Aceh) PS Peureulak Raya
	Report

Canda Bhirawa Stadium, Kediri Regency
2 May 2024
15:30 WIB (UTC+7)

Persibone (South Sulawesi)	2–2	(Central Java) PSIK
	Report

Canda Bhirawa Stadium, Kediri Regency

Matchday 3 (4 May)
4 May 2024
13:15 WIB (UTC+7)

PS Peureulak Raya (Aceh)	1–2	(South Sulawesi) Persibone
	Report

Canda Bhirawa Stadium, Kediri Regency
4 May 2024
15:30 WIB (UTC+7)

Adhyaksa Farmel (Banten)	1–1	(East Java) Persedikab
	Report

Canda Bhirawa Stadium, Kediri Regency

Matchday 4 (6 May)
6 May 2024
13:15 WIB (UTC+7)

Adhyaksa Farmel (Banten)	6–2	(South Sulawesi) Persibone
	Report

Canda Bhirawa Stadium, Kediri Regency
6 May 2024
15:30 WIB (UTC+7)

PSIK (Central Java)	6–2	(Aceh) PS Peureulak Raya
	Report

Canda Bhirawa Stadium, Kediri Regency

Matchday 5 (8 May)
8 May 2024
13:15 WIB (UTC+7)

Persedikab (East Java)	1–1	(Central Java) PSIK
	Report

Canda Bhirawa Stadium, Kediri Regency
8 May 2024
15:30 WIB (UTC+7)

PS Peureulak Raya (Aceh)	1–4	(Banten) Adhyaksa Farmel
	Report

Canda Bhirawa Stadium, Kediri Regency

=== Group P ===
All matches were held at Gajayana Stadium, Malang.

Pos	Team	Pld	W	D	L	GF	GA	GD	Pts	Qualification
1	(East Java) NZR Sumbersari (H)	4	4	0	0	9	3	+6	**12**	Advance to the second round
2	(Southeast Sulawesi) UHO MZF	4	2	1	1	6	2	+4	**7**	Advance to the second round
3	(West Kalimantan) Kalbar United	4	1	1	2	5	7	−2	**4**	
4	(West Sumatra) PSPP	4	1	0	3	8	13	−5	**3 (Note: Head-to-head result: PS Talenta Banua 3–5 PSPP.)**	
5	(South Kalimantan) PS Talenta Banua	4	1	0	3	7	10	−3	**3**	

Source: PSSI
Rules for classification: 1) Points; 2) Head-to-head points; 3) Head-to-head goal difference; 4) Head-to-head goals scored; 5) Goal difference; 6) Goals scored; 7) Fair-play points; 8) Draw.
(H) Hosts
Notes:

Matches

Matchday 1 (30 April)
30 April 2024
13:15 WIB (UTC+7)

PS Talenta Banua (South Kalimantan)	2–0	(West Kalimantan) Kalbar United
	Report

Gajayana Stadium, Malang
30 April 2024
15:30 WIB (UTC+7)

UHO MZF (Southeast Sulawesi)	0–1	(East Java) NZR Sumbersari
	Report

Gajayana Stadium, Malang

Matchday 2 (2 May)
2 May 2024
13:15 WIB (UTC+7)

NZR Sumbersari (East Java)	2–1	(West Sumatra) PSPP
	Report

Gajayana Stadium, Malang
2 May 2024
15:30 WIB (UTC+7)

UHO MZF (Southeast Sulawesi)	2–1	(South Kalimantan) PS Talenta Banua
	Report

Gajayana Stadium, Malang

Matchday 3 (4 May)
4 May 2024
13:15 WIB (UTC+7)

PSPP (West Sumatra)	0–4	(Southeast Sulawesi) UHO MZF
	Report

Gajayana Stadium, Malang
4 May 2024
15:30 WIB (UTC+7)

Kalbar United (West Kalimantan)	1–3	(East Java) NZR Sumbersari
	Report

Gajayana Stadium, Malang

Matchday 4 (6 May)
6 May 2024
13:15 WIB (UTC+7)

Kalbar United (West Kalimantan)	0–0	(Southeast Sulawesi) UHO MZF
	Report

Gajayana Stadium, Malang
6 May 2024
15:30 WIB (UTC+7)

PS Talenta Banua (South Kalimantan)	3–5	(West Sumatra) PSPP
	Report

Gajayana Stadium, Malang

Matchday 5 (8 May)
8 May 2024
13:15 WIB (UTC+7)

NZR Sumbersari (East Java)	3–1	(South Kalimantan) PS Talenta Banua
	Report

Gajayana Stadium, Malang
8 May 2024
15:30 WIB (UTC+7)

PSPP (West Sumatra)	2–4	(West Kalimantan) Kalbar United
	Report

Gajayana Stadium, Malang

== National Phase (Second Round) ==
The 32 teams that advanced from the preliminary round were divided into 8 groups of four teams to play single round-robin matches.

8 group winners and 8 runners-up will advance to the third round.

=== Qualified teams ===
Group	Winners	Runners-up
A	**(Banten) Persikota**	(East Kalimantan) Kartanegara (Mesra)
B	**(West Java) Persipasi**	**(Riau) Tornado**
C	(West Java) Persika 1951	(Riau) PS Siak
D	**(West Java) Persikas**	(Central Java) Persibangga
E	**(West Java) Dejan**	(South Sumatra) PS Palembang
F	**(Central Papua) Persipani**	(West Java) Persikasi
G	**(West Java) PSGC**	(North Sumatra) Labura Hebat
H	**(Central Papua) Waanal Brothers**	(Central Java) Persip
I	**(Central Java) Persiku**	**(Riau Islands) 757 Kepri Jaya**
J	(Central Java) PSDB United	(Central Java) Universitas Surakarta
K	**(Special Region of Yogyakarta) Persiba Bantul**	**(East Java) PSM Madiun**
L	(West Sumatra) Josal Piaman	(Special Region of Yogyakarta) PS HW UMY
M	(East Java) **Persibo**	(Bengkulu) Tri Brata Rafflesia
N	**(East Java) Persekabpas**	(Bangka Belitung Islands) PS Beltim
O	(Banten) **Adhyaksa Farmel**	(East Java) Persedikab
P	**(East Java) NZR Sumbersari**	(Southeast Sulawesi) UHO MZF

Note: Bolded teams qualified for the third round.

=== Group 1 ===
All matches were held at Benteng Reborn Stadium and DM Sport Ciledug, Tangerang.

Pos	Team	Pld	W	D	L	GF	GA	GD	Pts	Qualification
1	(Banten) Persikota (H)	3	2	1	0	4	0	+4	**7**	Advance to the third round
2	(Riau) Tornado	3	1	2	0	3	1	+2	**5**	Advance to the third round
3	(Central Java) Persibangga	3	1	0	2	3	5	−2	**3**	
4	(West Java) Persika 1951	3	0	1	2	2	6	−4	**1**	

Source: PSSI
Rules for classification: 1) Points; 2) Head-to-head points; 3) Head-to-head goal difference; 4) Head-to-head goals scored; 5) Goal difference; 6) Goals scored; 7) Fair-play points; 8) Draw.
(H) Hosts

Matches

Matchday 1 (11 May)
11 May 2024
19:00 WIB (UTC+7) (Note: The Persikota vs Persibangga match which was originally scheduled for 13:15 WIB, was rescheduled to 19:00 WIB due to bad weather.)

Persikota (Banten)	2–0	(Central Java) Persibangga
	Report

Benteng Reborn Stadium, Tangerang
11 May 2024
15:30 WIB (UTC+7)

Tornado (Riau)	1–1	(West Java) Persika 1951
	Report

Benteng Reborn Stadium, Tangerang

Matchday 2 (13 May)
13 May 2024
13:15 WIB (UTC+7)

Persibangga (Central Java)	0–2	(Riau) Tornado
	Report

Benteng Reborn Stadium, Tangerang
13 May 2024
15:30 WIB (UTC+7)

Persika 1951 (West Java)	0–2	(Banten) Persikota
	Report

Benteng Reborn Stadium, Tangerang

Matchday 3 (15 May)
15 May 2024
15:30 WIB (UTC+7)

Persikota (Banten)	0–0	(Riau) Tornado
	Report

Benteng Reborn Stadium, Tangerang
15 May 2024
15:30 WIB (UTC+7)

Persika 1951 (West Java)	1–3	(Central Java) Persibangga
	Report

DM Sport Ciledug, Tangerang

=== Group 2 ===
All matches were held at Cibinong Mini Stadium and Outer Field of Pakansari Stadium, Bogor Regency.

Pos	Team	Pld	W	D	L	GF	GA	GD	Pts	Qualification
1	(West Java) Persipasi (H)	3	2	1	0	4	1	+3	**7**	Advance to the third round
2	(West Java) Persikas	3	2	0	1	5	4	+1	**6**	Advance to the third round
3	(East Kalimantan) Kartanegara (Mesra)	3	1	1	1	4	2	+2	**4**	
4	(Riau) PS Siak	3	0	0	3	3	9	−6	**0**	

Source: PSSI
Rules for classification: 1) Points; 2) Head-to-head points; 3) Head-to-head goal difference; 4) Head-to-head goals scored; 5) Goal difference; 6) Goals scored; 7) Fair-play points; 8) Draw.
(H) Hosts

Matches

Matchday 1 (11 May)
11 May 2024
13:15 WIB (UTC+7)

Kartanegara (Mesra) (East Kalimantan)	0–1	(West Java) Persikas
	Report

Cibinong Mini Stadium, Bogor Regency
11 May 2024
15:30 WIB (UTC+7)

Persipasi (West Java)	2–0	(Riau) PS Siak
	Report

Cibinong Mini Stadium, Bogor Regency

Matchday 2 (13 May)
13 May 2024
13:15 WIB (UTC+7)

Persikas (West Java)	1–2	(West Java) Persipasi
	Report

Cibinong Mini Stadium, Bogor Regency
13 May 2024
15:30 WIB (UTC+7)

PS Siak (Riau)	1–4	(East Kalimantan) Kartanegara (Mesra)
	Report

Cibinong Mini Stadium, Bogor Regency

Matchday 3 (15 May)
15 May 2024
15:00 WIB (UTC+7)

Kartanegara (Mesra) (East Kalimantan)	0–0	(West Java) Persipasi
	Report

Cibinong Mini Stadium, Bogor Regency
15 May 2024
15:00 WIB (UTC+7)

PS Siak (Riau)	2–3	(West Java) Persikas
	Report

Outer Field of Pakansari Stadium, Bogor Regency

=== Group 3 ===
All matches were held at Siliwangi Stadium and Arcamanik Stadium, Bandung.

Pos	Team	Pld	W	D	L	GF	GA	GD	Pts	Qualification
1	(West Java) Dejan (H)	3	2	1	0	8	4	+4	**7**	Advance to the third round
2	(West Java) PSGC	3	1	2	0	6	5	+1	**5**	Advance to the third round
3	(Central Java) Persip	3	1	1	1	7	5	+2	**4**	
4	(West Java) Persikasi	3	0	0	3	1	8	−7	**0**	

Source: PSSI
Rules for classification: 1) Points; 2) Head-to-head points; 3) Head-to-head goal difference; 4) Head-to-head goals scored; 5) Goal difference; 6) Goals scored; 7) Fair-play points; 8) Draw.
(H) Hosts

Matches

Matchday 1 (11 May)
11 May 2024
13:15 WIB (UTC+7)

Dejan (West Java)	2–1	(Central Java) Persip
	Report

Siliwangi Stadium, Bandung
11 May 2024
15:30 WIB (UTC+7)

Persikasi (West Java)	0–1	(West Java) PSGC
	Report

Siliwangi Stadium, Bandung

Matchday 2 (13 May)
13 May 2024
13:15 WIB (UTC+7)

Persip (Central Java)	3–0	(West Java) Persikasi
	Report

Siliwangi Stadium, Bandung
13 May 2024
15:30 WIB (UTC+7)

PSGC (West Java)	2–2	(West Java) Dejan
	Report

Siliwangi Stadium, Bandung

Matchday 3 (15 May)
15 May 2024
15:30 WIB (UTC+7)

Dejan (West Java)	4–1	(West Java) Persikasi
	Report

Siliwangi Stadium, Bandung
15 May 2024
15:30 WIB (UTC+7)

PSGC (West Java)	3–3	(Central Java) Persip
	Report

Arcamanik Stadium, Bandung

=== Group 4 ===
All matches were held at R.A.A. Adiwijaya Stadium, Garut Regency and Wiradadaha Stadium, Tasikmalaya.

Pos	Team	Pld	W	D	L	GF	GA	GD	Pts	Qualification
1	(Central Papua) Waanal Brothers	3	2	1	0	12	2	+10	**7**	Advance to the third round
2	(Central Papua) Persipani	3	2	1	0	8	4	+4	**7**	Advance to the third round
3	(North Sumatra) Labura Hebat	3	1	0	2	5	9	−4	**3**	
4	(South Sumatra) PS Palembang	3	0	0	3	5	15	−10	**0**	

Source: PSSI
Rules for classification: 1) Points; 2) Head-to-head points; 3) Head-to-head goal difference; 4) Head-to-head goals scored; 5) Goal difference; 6) Goals scored; 7) Fair-play points; 8) Draw.

Matches

Matchday 1 (11 May)
11 May 2024
13:15 WIB (UTC+7)

PS Palembang (South Sumatra)	1–7	(Central Papua) Waanal Brothers
	Report

R.A.A. Adiwijaya Stadium, Garut Regency
11 May 2024
15:30 WIB (UTC+7)

Persipani (Central Papua)	3–1	(North Sumatra) Labura Hebat
	Report

R.A.A. Adiwijaya Stadium, Garut Regency

Matchday 2 (13 May)
13 May 2024
13:15 WIB (UTC+7)

Waanal Brothers (Central Papua)	1–1	(Central Papua) Persipani
	Report

R.A.A. Adiwijaya Stadium, Garut Regency
13 May 2024
15:30 WIB (UTC+7)

Labura Hebat (North Sumatra)	4–2	(South Sumatra) PS Palembang
	Report

R.A.A. Adiwijaya Stadium, Garut Regency

Matchday 3 (15 May)
15 May 2024
15:00 WIB (UTC+7)

PS Palembang (South Sumatra)	2–4	(Central Papua) Persipani
	Report

R.A.A. Adiwijaya Stadium, Garut Regency
15 May 2024
15:00 WIB (UTC+7)

Labura Hebat (North Sumatra)	0–4	(Central Papua) Waanal Brothers
	Report

Wiradadaha Stadium, Tasikmalaya

=== Group 5 ===
All matches were held at Wergu Wetan Stadium, Kudus Regency and Gelora Soekarno Mojoagung Stadium, Pati Regency.

Pos	Team	Pld	W	D	L	GF	GA	GD	Pts	Qualification
1	(Central Java) Persiku (H)	3	2	0	1	2	1	+1	**6**	Advance to the third round
2	(Special Region of Yogyakarta) Persiba Bantul	3	1	2	0	2	1	+1	**5**	Advance to the third round
3	(Central Java) Universitas Surakarta	3	1	1	1	2	2	0	**4**	
4	(Special Region of Yogyakarta) PS HW UMY	3	0	1	2	0	2	−2	**1**	

Source: PSSI
Rules for classification: 1) Points; 2) Head-to-head points; 3) Head-to-head goal difference; 4) Head-to-head goals scored; 5) Goal difference; 6) Goals scored; 7) Fair-play points; 8) Draw.
(H) Hosts

Matches

Matchday 1 (12 May)
12 May 2024
13:15 WIB (UTC+7)

Universitas Surakarta (Central Java)	1–1	(Special Region of Yogyakarta) Persiba Bantul
	Report

Wergu Wetan Stadium, Kudus Regency
12 May 2024
15:30 WIB (UTC+7)

Persiku (Central Java)	1–0	(Special Region of Yogyakarta) PS HW UMY
	Report

Wergu Wetan Stadium, Kudus Regency

Matchday 2 (14 May)
14 May 2024
13:15 WIB (UTC+7)

Persiku (Central Java)	1–0	(Central Java) Universitas Surakarta
	Report

Wergu Wetan Stadium, Kudus Regency
14 May 2024
15:30 WIB (UTC+7)

Persiba Bantul (Special Region of Yogyakarta)	0–0	(Special Region of Yogyakarta) PS HW UMY
	Report

Wergu Wetan Stadium, Kudus Regency

Matchday 3 (16 May)
16 May 2024
15:30 WIB (UTC+7)

Persiba Bantul (Special Region of Yogyakarta)	1–0	(Central Java) Persiku
	Report

Wergu Wetan Stadium, Kudus Regency
16 May 2024
15:30 WIB (UTC+7)

PS HW UMY (Special Region of Yogyakarta)	0–1	(Central Java) Universitas Surakarta
	Report

Gelora Soekarno Mojoagung Stadium, Pati Regency

=== Group 6 ===
All matches were held at Sultan Fatah Stadium, Demak Regency and Citarum Stadium, Semarang.

Pos	Team	Pld	W	D	L	GF	GA	GD	Pts	Qualification
1	(Riau Islands) 757 Kepri Jaya	3	2	0	1	6	5	+1	**6 (Note: Head-to-head result: PSM Madiun 1–3 757 Kepri Jaya.)**	Advance to the third round
2	(East Java) PSM Madiun	3	2	0	1	6	6	0	**6**	Advance to the third round
3	(Central Java) PSDB United (H)	3	1	1	1	5	4	+1	**4**	
4	(West Sumatra) Josal Piaman	3	0	1	2	4	6	−2	**1**	

Source: PSSI
Rules for classification: 1) Points; 2) Head-to-head points; 3) Head-to-head goal difference; 4) Head-to-head goals scored; 5) Goal difference; 6) Goals scored; 7) Fair-play points; 8) Draw.
(H) Hosts
Notes:

Matches

Matchday 1 (12 May)
12 May 2024
13:15 WIB (UTC+7)

757 Kepri Jaya (Riau Islands)	2–1	(West Sumatra) Josal Piaman
	Report

Sultan Fatah Stadium, Demak Regency
12 May 2024
15:30 WIB (UTC+7)

PSDB United (Central Java)	1–2	(East Java) PSM Madiun
	Report

Sultan Fatah Stadium, Demak Regency

Matchday 2 (14 May)
14 May 2024
13:15 WIB (UTC+7)

Josal Piaman (West Sumatra)	1–1	(Central Java) PSDB United
	Report

Sultan Fatah Stadium, Demak Regency
14 May 2024
15:30 WIB (UTC+7)

PSM Madiun (East Java)	1–3	(Riau Islands) 757 Kepri Jaya
	Report

Sultan Fatah Stadium, Demak Regency

Matchday 1 (16 May)
16 May 2024
15:30 WIB (UTC+7)

757 Kepri Jaya (Riau Islands)	1–3	(Central Java) PSDB United
	Report

Sultan Fatah Stadium, Demak Regency
16 May 2024
15:30 WIB (UTC+7)

PSM Madiun (East Java)	3–2	(West Sumatra) Josal Piaman
	Report

Citarum Stadium, Semarang

=== Group 7 ===
All matches were held at Letjen Haji Sudirman Stadium and Gayam Stadium, Bojonegoro Regency

Pos	Team	Pld	W	D	L	GF	GA	GD	Pts	Qualification
1	(East Java) Persibo (H)	3	2	1	0	12	2	+10	**7**	Advance to the third round
2	(Banten) Adhyaksa Farmel	3	2	1	0	7	2	+5	**7**	Advance to the third round
3	(Southeast Sulawesi) UHO MZF	3	1	0	2	4	5	−1	**3**	
4	(Bangka Belitung Islands) PS Beltim	3	0	0	3	1	15	−14	**0**	

Source: PSSI
Rules for classification: 1) Points; 2) Head-to-head points; 3) Head-to-head goal difference; 4) Head-to-head goals scored; 5) Goal difference; 6) Goals scored; 7) Fair-play points; 8) Draw.
(H) Hosts

Matches

Matchday 1 (12 May)
12 May 2024
13:15 WIB (UTC+7)

PS Beltim (Bangka Belitung Islands)	1–4	(Banten) Adhyaksa Farmel
	Report

Letjen Haji Sudirman Stadium, Bojonegoro Regency
12 May 2024
15:30 WIB (UTC+7)

Persibo (East Java)	3–1	(Southeast Sulawesi) UHO MZF
	Report

Letjen Haji Sudirman Stadium, Bojonegoro Regency

Matchday 2 (14 May)
14 May 2024
13:15 WIB (UTC+7)

Persibo (East Java)	8–0	(Bangka Belitung Islands) PS Beltim
	Report

Letjen Haji Sudirman Stadium, Bojonegoro Regency
14 May 2024
15:30 WIB (UTC+7)

Adhyaksa Farmel (Banten)	2–0	(Southeast Sulawesi) UHO MZF
	Report

Letjen Haji Sudirman Stadium, Bojonegoro Regency

Matchday 3 (16 May)
16 May 2024
15:30 WIB (UTC+7)

Adhyaksa Farmel (Banten)	1–1	(East Java) Persibo
	Report

Letjen Haji Sudirman Stadium, Bojonegoro Regency
16 May 2024
15:30 WIB (UTC+7)

UHO MZF (Southeast Sulawesi)	3–0	(Bangka Belitung Islands) PS Beltim
	Report

Gayam Stadium, Bojonegoro Regency

=== Group 8 ===
All matches were held at Gajayana Stadium, Malang and Dirgantara Abdulrachman Saleh Stadium, Malang Regency.

Pos	Team	Pld	W	D	L	GF	GA	GD	Pts	Qualification
1	(East Java) Persekabpas	3	1	2	0	5	2	+3	**5**	Advance to the third round
2	(East Java) NZR Sumbersari (H)	3	0	3	0	4	4	0	**3**	Advance to the third round
3	(East Java) Persedikab	3	0	3	0	2	2	0	**3**	
4	(Bengkulu) Tri Brata Rafflesia	3	0	2	1	2	5	−3	**2**	

Source: PSSI
Rules for classification: 1) Points; 2) Head-to-head points; 3) Head-to-head goal difference; 4) Head-to-head goals scored; 5) Goal difference; 6) Goals scored; 7) Fair-play points; 8) Draw.
(H) Hosts

Matches

Matchday 1 (12 May)
12 May 2024
13:15 WIB (UTC+7)

Persekabpas (East Java)	1–1	(East Java) Persedikab
	Report

Gajayana Stadium, Malang
12 May 2024
16:20 WIB (UTC+7) (Note: The Tri Brata Rafflesia vs NZR Sumbersari match which was originally scheduled for 15:30 WIB, was rescheduled to 16:20 WIB due to club administrative reasons. The match was stopped in the 72nd minute due to technical issues at the stadium, and will resume on 13 May 2024 at 08:00 WIB.)

Tri Brata Rafflesia (Bengkulu)	2–2	(East Java) NZR Sumbersari
	Report

Gajayana Stadium, Malang

Matchday 2 (14 May)
14 May 2024
13:15 WIB (UTC+7)

NZR Sumbersari (East Java)	1–1	(East Java) Persekabpas
	Report

Gajayana Stadium, Malang
14 May 2024
15:30 WIB (UTC+7)

Persedikab (East Java)	0–0	(Bengkulu) Tri Brata Rafflesia
	Report

Gajayana Stadium, Malang

Matchday 3 (16 May)
16 May 2024
15:30 WIB (UTC+7)

Persedikab (East Java)	1–1	(East Java) NZR Sumbersari
	Report

Gajayana Stadium, Malang
16 May 2024
15:30 WIB (UTC+7)

Tri Brata Rafflesia (Bengkulu)	0–3	(East Java) Persekabpas
	Report

Dirgantara Abdulrachman Saleh Stadium, Malang Regency

== National Phase (Third Round) ==
The 16 teams that advanced from the second round were divided into 4 groups of four teams to play single round-robin matches. Matches in this round are held at neutral venues.

4 group winners and 4 runners-up will advance to the fourth round.

=== Draw ===
The draw for third round was held on 17 May 2024. The 16 teams were drawn into four groups.

The following draw mechanism is applied:
1. The 16 teams seeded into two pots based on their performance in second round. Pot 1 contains the group winners and pot 2 contains the runners-up teams of the second round.
2. The teams were drawn into 4 groups. Each group contains two teams from pot 1 and two teams from pot 2.

Pot 1	Pot 2
1. (Banten) **Persikota**; 2. (West Java) Persipasi^{LN}; 3. (West Java) **Dejan**; 4. (Central Papua) Waanal Brothers^{LN}; 5. (Central Java) **Persiku**; 6. (Riau Islands) 757 Kepri Jaya^{LN}; 7. (East Java) **Persibo**; 8. (East Java) **Persekabpas**	9. (Riau) **Tornado**; 10. (West Java) **Persikas**; 11. (West Java) PSGC^{LN}; 12. (Central Papua) Persipani^{LN}; 13. (Special Region of Yogyakarta) Persiba Bantul^{LN}; 14. (East Java) PSM Madiun^{LN}; 15. (Banten) **Adhyaksa Farmel**; 16. (East Java) NZR Sumbersari^{LN}

Note: Bolded teams qualified for the fourth round.

- ^{LN} Qualified for the 2024–25 Liga Nusantara.

=== Group 1 ===
All matches were held at Benteng Reborn Stadium and DM Sport Ciledug, Tangerang.

Pos	Team	Pld	W	D	L	GF	GA	GD	Pts	Qualification
1	(West Java) Persikas	3	2	1	0	5	3	+2	**7**	Advanced to the fourth round
2	(East Java) Persibo	3	2	0	1	5	2	+3	**6**	Advanced to the fourth round
3	(Central Papua) Waanal Brothers	3	1	1	1	6	6	0	**4**	Qualification for the 2024–25 Liga Nusantara
4	(East Java) PSM Madiun	3	0	0	3	3	8	−5	**0**	Qualification for the 2024–25 Liga Nusantara

Source: PSSI
Rules for classification: 1) Points; 2) Head-to-head points; 3) Head-to-head goal difference; 4) Head-to-head goals scored; 5) Goal difference; 6) Goals scored; 7) Fair-play points; 8) Draw.

Matches

Matchday 1 (21 May)
21 May 2024
13:15 WIB (UTC+7)

Persibo (East Java)	0–1	(West Java) Persikas
	Report

Benteng Reborn Stadium, Tangerang
21 May 2024
15:30 WIB (UTC+7)

PSM Madiun (East Java)	2–3	(Central Papua) Waanal Brothers
	Report

Benteng Reborn Stadium, Tangerang

Matchday 2 (23 May)
23 May 2024
13:15 WIB (UTC+7)

Persikas (West Java)	2–1	(East Java) PSM Madiun
	Report

Benteng Reborn Stadium, Tangerang
23 May 2024
15:30 WIB (UTC+7)

Waanal Brothers (Central Papua)	1–2	(East Java) Persibo
	Report

Benteng Reborn Stadium, Tangerang

Matchday 3 (25 May)
25 May 2024
15:30 WIB (UTC+7)

Persibo (East Java)	3–0	(East Java) PSM Madiun
	Report

Benteng Reborn Stadium, Tangerang
25 May 2024
15:30 WIB (UTC+7)

Waanal Brothers (Central Papua)	2–2	(West Java) Persikas
	Report

DM Sport Ciledug, Tangerang

=== Group 2 ===
All matches were held at Cibinong Mini Stadium and Outer Field of Pakansari Stadium, Bogor Regency.

Pos	Team	Pld	W	D	L	GF	GA	GD	Pts	Qualification
1	(Central Java) Persiku	3	2	0	1	4	1	+3	**6 (Note: Head-to-head result: Persiku 1–0 Persekabpas.)**	Advanced to the fourth round
2	(East Java) Persekabpas	3	2	0	1	4	3	+1	**6**	Advanced to the fourth round
3	(West Java) PSGC	3	1	0	2	4	7	−3	**3 (Note: Head-to-head result: NZR Sumbersari 1–2 PSGC.)**	Qualification for the 2024–25 Liga Nusantara
4	(East Java) NZR Sumbersari	3	1	0	2	2	3	−1	**3**	Qualification for the 2024–25 Liga Nusantara

Source: PSSI
Rules for classification: 1) Points; 2) Head-to-head points; 3) Head-to-head goal difference; 4) Head-to-head goals scored; 5) Goal difference; 6) Goals scored; 7) Fair-play points; 8) Draw.
Notes:

Matches

Matchday 1 (21 May)
21 May 2024
13:15 WIB (UTC+7)

NZR Sumbersari (East Java)	1–2	(West Java) PSGC
	Report

Cibinong Mini Stadium, Bogor Regency
21 May 2024
15:30 WIB (UTC+7)

Persiku (Central Java)	1–0	(East Java) Persekabpas
	Report

Cibinong Mini Stadium, Bogor Regency

Matchday 2 (23 May)
23 May 2024
13:15 WIB (UTC+7)

PSGC (West Java)	0–3	(Central Java) Persiku
	Report

Cibinong Mini Stadium, Bogor Regency
23 May 2024
15:30 WIB (UTC+7)

Persekabpas (East Java)	1–0	(East Java) NZR Sumbersari
	Report

Cibinong Mini Stadium, Bogor Regency

Matchday 3 (25 May)
25 May 2024
15:00 WIB (UTC+7)

NZR Sumbersari (East Java)	1–0	(Central Java) Persiku
	Report

Cibinong Mini Stadium, Bogor Regency
25 May 2024
15:00 WIB (UTC+7)

Persekabpas (East Java)	3–2	(West Java) PSGC
	Report

Outer Field of Pakansari Stadium, Bogor Regency

=== Group 3 ===
All matches were held at Sultan Agung Stadium, and Dwi Windu Stadium, Bantul Regency.

Pos	Team	Pld	W	D	L	GF	GA	GD	Pts	Qualification
1	(West Java) Dejan	3	2	1	0	3	1	+2	**7**	Advanced to the fourth round
2	(Riau) Tornado	3	1	1	1	3	3	0	**4**	Advanced to the fourth round
3	(West Java) Persipasi	3	0	3	0	6	6	0	**3**	Qualification for the 2024–25 Liga Nusantara
4	(Central Papua) Persipani	3	0	1	2	3	5	−2	**1**	Qualification for the 2024–25 Liga Nusantara

Source: PSSI
Rules for classification: 1) Points; 2) Head-to-head points; 3) Head-to-head goal difference; 4) Head-to-head goals scored; 5) Goal difference; 6) Goals scored; 7) Fair-play points; 8) Draw.

Matchday 1 (21 May)
21 May 2024
13:15 WIB (UTC+7)

Persipasi (West Java)	2–2	(Riau) Tornado
	Report

Sultan Agung Stadium, Bantul Regency
21 May 2024
15:30 WIB (UTC+7)

Persipani (Central Papua)	0–1	(West Java) Dejan
	Report

Sultan Agung Stadium, Bantul Regency

Matchday 2 (23 May)
23 May 2024
13:15 WIB (UTC+7)

Tornado (Riau)	1–0	(Central Papua) Persipani
	Report

Sultan Agung Stadium, Bantul Regency
23 May 2024
15:30 WIB (UTC+7)

Dejan (West Java)	1–1	(West Java) Persipasi
	Report

Sultan Agung Stadium, Bantul Regency

Matchday 3 (25 May)
25 May 2024
15:00 WIB (UTC+7)

Persipasi (West Java)	3–3	(Central Papua) Persipani
	Report

Sultan Agung Stadium, Bantul Regency
25 May 2024
15:00 WIB (UTC+7)

Dejan (West Java)	1–0	(Riau) Tornado
	Report

Dwi Windu Stadium, Bantul Regency

=== Group 4 ===
All matches were held at Letjen Haji Sudirman Stadium and Gayam Stadium, Bojonegoro Regency.

Pos	Team	Pld	W	D	L	GF	GA	GD	Pts	Qualification
1	(Banten) Persikota	3	2	1	0	3	1	+2	**7**	Advanced to the fourth round
2	(Banten) Adhyaksa Farmel	3	1	2	0	4	3	+1	**5**	Advanced to the fourth round
3	(Special Region of Yogyakarta) Persiba Bantul	3	1	1	1	5	4	+1	**4**	Qualification for the 2024–25 Liga Nusantara
4	(Riau Islands) 757 Kepri Jaya	3	0	0	3	3	7	−4	**0**	Qualification for the 2024–25 Liga Nusantara

Source: PSSI
Rules for classification: 1) Points; 2) Head-to-head points; 3) Head-to-head goal difference; 4) Head-to-head goals scored; 5) Goal difference; 6) Goals scored; 7) Fair-play points; 8) Draw.

Matches

Matchday 1 (21 May)
21 May 2024
13:15 WIB (UTC+7)

757 Kepri Jaya (Riau Islands)	1–2	(Banten) Adhyaksa Farmel
	Report

Letjen Haji Sudirman Stadium, Bojonegoro Regency
21 May 2024
15:30 WIB (UTC+7)

Persiba Bantul (Special Region of Yogyakarta)	0–1	(Banten) Persikota
	Report

Letjen Haji Sudirman Stadium, Bojonegoro Regency

Matchday 2 (23 May)
23 May 2024
13:15 WIB (UTC+7)

Adhyaksa Farmel (Banten)	2–2	(Special Region of Yogyakarta) Persiba Bantul
	Report

Letjen Haji Sudirman Stadium, Bojonegoro Regency
23 May 2024
15:30 WIB (UTC+7)

Persikota (Banten)	2–1	(Riau Islands) 757 Kepri Jaya
	Report

Letjen Haji Sudirman Stadium, Bojonegoro Regency

Matchday 3 (25 May)
25 May 2024
15:00 WIB (UTC+7)

757 Kepri Jaya (Riau Islands)	1–3	(Special Region of Yogyakarta) Persiba Bantul
	Report

Letjen Haji Sudirman Stadium, Bojonegoro Regency
25 May 2024
15:00 WIB (UTC+7)

Persikota (Banten)	0–0	(Banten) Adhyaksa Farmel
	Report

Gayam Stadium, Bojonegoro Regency

== National Phase (Fourth Round) ==
The 8 teams that advanced from the Third round were divided into 2 groups of four teams to play single round-robin matches.

2 group winners will advance to the final. The top three teams from each group will be promoted to the 2024–25 Liga 2.

=== Qualified teams ===
Group	Winners	Runners-up
1	(West Java) Persikas^{P}	(East Java) **Persibo** ^{P}
2	(Central Java) Persiku ^{P}	(East Java) Persekabpas^{LN}
3	(West Java) Dejan ^{P}	(Riau) Tornado^{LN}
4	(Banten) Persikota ^{P}	(Banten) **Adhyaksa Farmel** ^{P}

Notes:

- **Bolded** teams qualified for the final.
- ^{P} Promoted to the 2024–25 Liga 2.
- ^{LN} Qualified for the 2024–25 Liga Nusantara.

=== Group 1 ===
All matches will be held at Benteng Reborn Stadium and DM Sport Ciledug, Tangerang.

Pos	Team	Pld	W	D	L	GF	GA	GD	Pts	Promotion or qualification
1	(Banten) Adhyaksa Farmel (P)	3	2	0	1	5	3	+2	**6 (Note: Head-to-head result: Dejan 0–1 Adhyaksa Farmel.)**	Advanced to the Final and promoted to 2024–25 Liga 2
2	(West Java) Dejan (P)	3	2	0	1	5	1	+4	**6**	Promoted to the 2024–25 Liga 2
3	(West Java) Persikas (P)	3	1	0	2	2	5	−3	**3 (Note: Head-to-head result: Persikas 1–0 Persekabpas.)**	Promoted to the 2024–25 Liga 2
4	(East Java) Persekabpas	3	1	0	2	2	5	−3	**3**	Qualification for the 2024–25 Liga Nusantara

Source: PSSI
Rules for classification: 1) Points; 2) Head-to-head points; 3) Head-to-head goal difference; 4) Head-to-head goals scored; 5) Goal difference; 6) Goals scored; 7) Fair-play points; 8) Draw.
(P) Promoted
Notes:

Matches

Matchday 1 (30 May)
30 May 2024
13:15 WIB (UTC+7)

Persikas (West Java)	1–3	(Banten) Adhyaksa Farmel
	Report

Benteng Reborn Stadium, Tangerang
30 May 2024
15:30 WIB (UTC+7)

Persekabpas (East Java)	0–3	(West Java) Dejan
	Report

Benteng Reborn Stadium, Tangerang

Matchday 2 (1 June)
1 June 2024
13:15 WIB (UTC+7)

Adhyaksa Farmel (Banten)	1–2	(East Java) Persekabpas
	Report

Benteng Reborn Stadium, Tangerang
1 June 2024
15:30 WIB (UTC+7)

Dejan (West Java)	2–0	(West Java) Persikas
	Report

Benteng Reborn Stadium, Tangerang

Matchday 3 (3 June)
3 June 2024
15:30 WIB (UTC+7)

Persikas (West Java)	1–0	(East Java) Persekabpas
	Report

DM Sport Ciledug, Tangerang
3 June 2024
15:30 WIB (UTC+7)

Dejan (West Java)	0–1	(Banten) Adhyaksa Farmel
	Report

Benteng Reborn Stadium, Tangerang

=== Group 2 ===
All matches were held at Cibinong Mini Stadium and Outer Field of Pakansari Stadium, Bogor Regency.

Pos	Team	Pld	W	D	L	GF	GA	GD	Pts	Promotion or qualification
1	(East Java) Persibo (P)	3	2	1	0	2	0	+2	**7**	Advanced to the Final and promoted to 2024–25 Liga 2
2	(Banten) Persikota (P)	3	1	2	0	2	1	+1	**5**	Promoted to the 2024–25 Liga 2
3	(Central Java) Persiku (P)	3	1	1	1	2	1	+1	**4**	Promoted to the 2024–25 Liga 2
4	(Riau) Tornado	3	0	0	3	1	5	−4	**0**	Qualification for the 2024–25 Liga Nusantara

Source: PSSI
Rules for classification: 1) Points; 2) Head-to-head points; 3) Head-to-head goal difference; 4) Head-to-head goals scored; 5) Goal difference; 6) Goals scored; 7) Fair-play points; 8) Draw.
(P) Promoted

Matches

Matchday 1 (30 May)
30 May 2024
13:15 WIB (UTC+7)

Persibo (East Java)	0–0	(Banten) Persikota
	Report

Cibinong Mini Stadium, Bogor Regency
30 May 2024
15:30 WIB (UTC+7)

Persiku (Central Java)	2–0	(Riau) Tornado
	Report

Cibinong Mini Stadium, Bogor Regency

Matchday 1 (1 June)
1 June 2024
13:15 WIB (UTC+7)

Persikota (Banten)	0–0	(Central Java) Persiku
	Report

Cibinong Mini Stadium, Bogor Regency
1 June 2024
15:30 WIB (UTC+7)

Tornado (Riau)	0–1	(East Java) Persibo
	Report

Cibinong Mini Stadium, Bogor Regency

Matchday 1 (3 June)
3 June 2024
15:00 WIB (UTC+7)

Persibo (East Java)	1–0	(Central Java) Persiku
	Report

Outer Field of Pakansari Stadium, Bogor Regency
3 June 2024
15:00 WIB (UTC+7)

Tornado (Riau)	1–2	(Banten) Persikota
	Report

Cibinong Mini Stadium, Bogor Regency

== Final ==
The 2 group winners from the fourth round will play in the final match. The final will be played as a single match. If tied after regulation time, extra time and, if necessary, a penalty shoot-out will be used to decide the winning team.

7 June 2024
14:00 WIB (UTC+7)

Adhyaksa Farmel (Banten)	3–2 (a.e.t.)	(East Java) Persibo
Firmansyah 27'; Dede Aldiansyah 92'; Jufanov Gumanti 106'	Report	Diego Banowo 44'; Ahmad Maulana 111'

Cibinong Mini Stadium, Bogor Regency
Referee: Yoko Suprianto (Indonesia)

== Promotion to the 2024–25 Liga 2 ==
Team	Method of qualification	Date of qualification	Qualified to
Dejan	Runner-up of Fourth Round Group 1	1 June 2024	2024–25 Liga 2
Persibo	Winner of Fourth Round Group 2	1 June 2024	2024–25 Liga 2
Persiku	Third place of Fourth Round Group 2	1 June 2024	2024–25 Liga 2
Adhyaksa Farmel	Winner of Fourth Round Group 1	3 June 2024	2024–25 Liga 2
Persikas	Third place of Fourth Round Group 1	3 June 2024	2024–25 Liga 2
Persikota	Runner-up of Fourth Round Group 2	3 June 2024	2024–25 Liga 2

== Season Statistics (National Phase) ==
=== Top Goalscorers ===
As of 25 May 2024

Rank	Player	Team	Goals
1	(Indonesia) Ega Nugraha	Persikas	8
1	(Indonesia) Andi Sopian	Dejan	8
1	(Indonesia) Adam Malik	Persipasi	8
1	(Indonesia) Bahari Kurniawan	Waanal Brothers	8
5	(Indonesia) Afriansyah	Adhyaksa Farmel	7
5	(Indonesia) Diego Banowo	Persibo	7
5	(Indonesia) Shahih Elang Rishandy	Persip	7
8	(Indonesia) Ridwan Pri Handoko	PSM Madiun	6
8	(Indonesia) Rizqi Fauzan	Persibangga	6
8	(Indonesia) Luthfi El Hakim Saragih	Persikota	6
8	(Indonesia) Alvin Dwi Guna	Labura Hebat	6

== Awards ==
Award	Winner	Club	Ref.
Best Player	(Indonesia) Sehabudin Ahmad	Adhyaksa Farmel	
Top goalscorer	(Indonesia) Andi Sopian	Dejan	
Best Young Player	(Indonesia) Kadir Toyo	Adhyaksa Farmel	
Fair Play Team	Dejan		

== See also ==
- 2023–24 Liga 1
- 2023–24 Liga 2
