= 2024 Liga 3 (Indonesia) final =

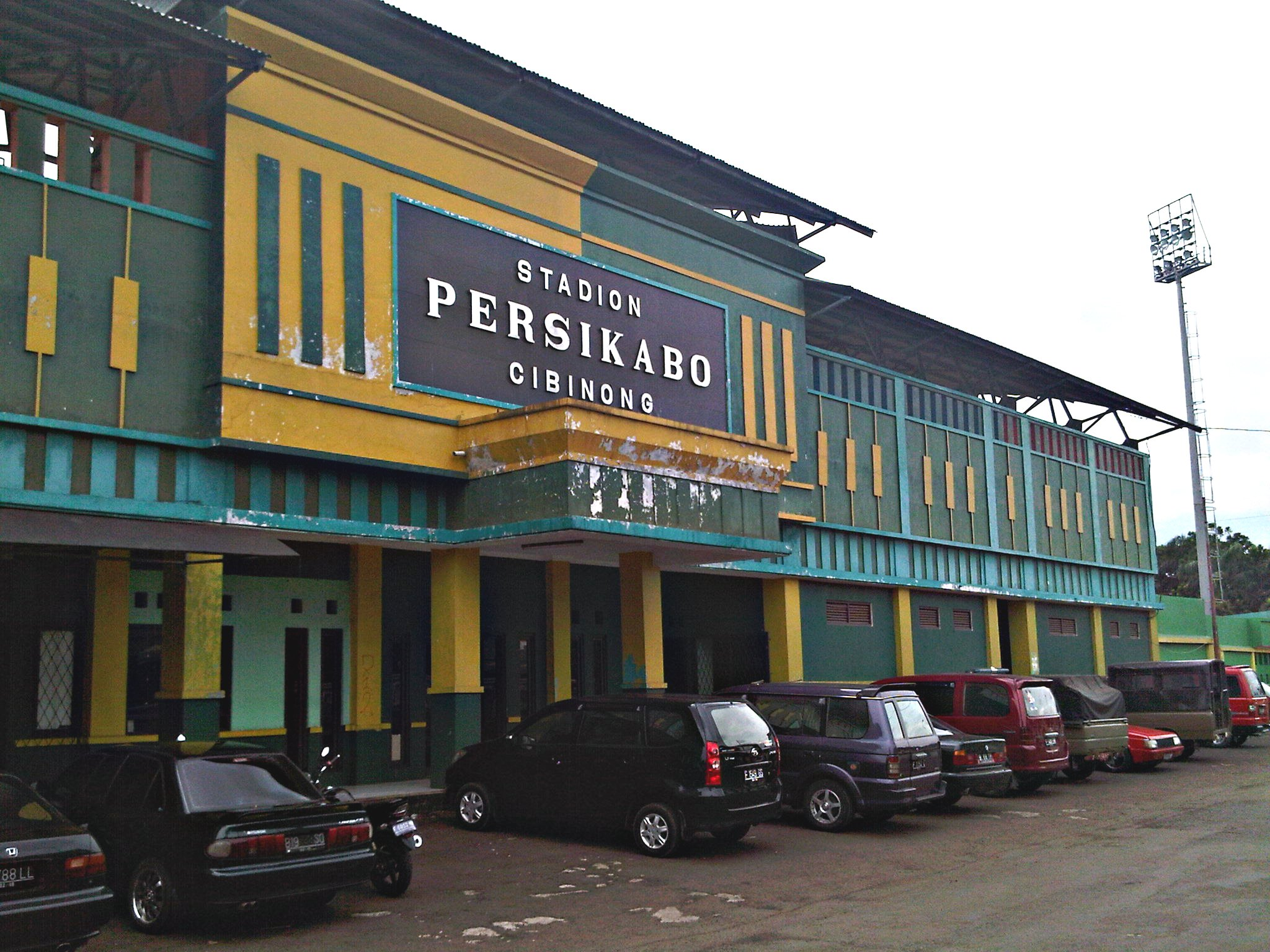
- The Cibinong Mini Stadium in Bogor hosted the final.
- Event: 2023–24 Liga 3 (Indonesia)
Adhyaksa Farmel	Persibo
(Banten)	(East Java)
3	2
- After extra time
- Date: 7 June 2024
- Venue: Cibinong Mini Stadium, Bogor
- Referee: Yoko Suprianto (Indonesia)

The 2024 Liga 3 final was the final of the 2023–24 Liga 3, the seventh season of the Liga 3 under the current name and the eighth season under the current league structure. The match was held at the Cibinong Mini Stadium in Bogor, Indonesia, on 7 Juny 2024 and was contested by Adhyaksa Farmel and Persibo.

Adhyaksa Farmel won the match, defeating Persibo 3–2 in extra time, after the match was drawn at 1–1 at the conclusion of regular time.

== Background ==
=== Adhyaksa Farmel ===
This is Adhyaksa Farmel's first ever third-tier league final.

This season Adhyaksa Farmel was successfully promoted to the 2024–25 Liga 2, and will be making their first debut in the second-tier league.

=== Persibo Bojonegoro ===
Persibo Bojonegoro had reached the final of the third-tier football league in the Indonesian football competition system once, back in the Second Division era. Their last final was the 2004 Second Division. In the match, they clinched a 1–0 victory over Persipur to secure the title.

This season Persibo Bojonegoro was successfully promoted to the 2024–25 Liga 2, returning to the second-tier league after last playing in the 2009–10 Premier Division.

=== Previous finals ===
Team	Previous final appearances in third-tier competitions (bold indicates winners)
Adhyaksa Farmel	None
Persibo	1 (**2004**)

== Route to the final ==
Adhyaksa Farmel
Round
Persibo
Provincial phase
**2023 Liga 3 Banten** **champions**
Final results
**2023–24 Liga 3 East Java** **champions**
National phase
Opponents
Result
Preliminary round
Opponents
Result
PSIK
3–2
Matchday 1
QDR
2–0
Persedikab
1–1
Matchday 2
Tri Brata Rafflesia
2–1
Persibone
6–2
Matchday 3
Persic
0–0
PS Peureulak Raya
4–1
Matchday 4
PSIW
5–0
**Group O** **winner**

Pos	Team	Pld	Pts
**1**	(Banten) Adhyaksa Farmel	**4**	**10**
2	(East Java) Persedikab (H)	4	**8**
3	(Central Java) PSIK	4	**5**
4	(South Sulawesi) Persibone	4	**4**
5	(Aceh) PS Peureulak Raya	4	**0**

Source: PSSI
(H) Hosts
Final standings
**Group M** **winner**

Pos	Team	Pld	Pts
**1**	(East Java) Persibo (H)	**4**	**10**
2	(Bengkulu) Tri Brata Rafflesia	4	**7**
3	(Banten) Persic	4	**5**
4	(Central Java) PSIW	4	**5**
5	(South Sulawesi) QDR	4	**0**

Source: PSSI
(H) Hosts
Opponents
Result
Second round
Opponents
Result
PS Beltim
4–1
Matchday 1
UHO MZF
3–1
UHO MZF
2–0
Matchday 2
PS Beltim
8–0
Persibo
1–1
Matchday 3
Adhyaksa Farmel
1–1
**Group 7** **runner-up**

Pos	Team	Pld	Pts
1	(East Java) Persibo (H)	3	**7**
**2**	(Banten) Adhyaksa Farmel	**3**	**7**
3	(Southeast Sulawesi) UHO MZF	3	**3**
4	(Bangka Belitung Islands) PS Beltim	3	**0**

Source: PSSI
(H) Hosts
Final standings
**Group 7** **winner**

Pos	Team	Pld	Pts
**1**	(East Java) Persibo (H)	**3**	**7**
2	(Banten) Adhyaksa Farmel	3	**7**
3	(Southeast Sulawesi) UHO MZF	3	**3**
4	(Bangka Belitung Islands) PS Beltim	3	**0**

Source: PSSI
(H) Hosts
Opponents
Result
Third round
Opponents
Result
757 Kepri Jaya
2–1
Matchday 1
Persikas
0–1
Persiba Bantul
2–2
Matchday 2
Waanal Brothers
2–1
Persikota
0–0
Matchday 3
PSM Madiun
3–0
**Group 4** **runner-up**

Pos	Team	Pld	Pts
1	(Banten) Persikota	3	**7**
**2**	(Banten) Adhyaksa Farmel	**3**	**5**
3	(Special Region of Yogyakarta) Persiba Bantul	3	**4**
4	(Riau Islands) 757 Kepri Jaya	3	**0**

Source: PSSI
Final standings
**Group 1** **runner-up**

Pos	Team	Pld	Pts
1	(West Java) Persikas	3	**7**
**2**	(East Java) Persibo	**3**	**6**
3	(Central Papua) Waanal Brothers	3	**4**
4	(East Java) PSM Madiun	3	**0**

Source: PSSI
Opponents
Result
Fourth round
Opponents
Result
Persikas
3–1
Matchday 1
Persikota
0–0
Persekabpas
1–2
Matchday 2
Tornado
1–0
Dejan
1–0
Matchday 3
Persiku
1–0
**Group 1** **winner**

Pos	Team	Pld	Pts
**1**	(Banten) Adhyaksa Farmel (P)	**3**	**6**
2	(West Java) Dejan (P)	3	**6**
3	(West Java) Persikas (P)	3	**3**
4	(East Java) Persekabpas	3	**3**

Source: PSSI
(P) Promoted
Final standings
**Group 2** **winner**

Pos	Team	Pld	Pts
**1**	(East Java) Persibo (P)	**3**	**7**
2	(Banten) Persikota (P)	3	**5**
3	(Central Java) Persiku (P)	3	**4**
4	(Riau) Tornado	3	**0**

Source: PSSI
(P) Promoted

== Format ==
The final will be played as a single match. If tied after regulation time, extra time and, if necessary, a penalty shoot-out will be used to decide the winning team.

== Match ==
7 June 2024
14:00 WIB (UTC+7)

Adhyaksa Farmel (Banten)	3–2 (a.e.t.)	(East Java) Persibo
Firmansyah 27'; Dede Aldiansyah 92'; Jufanov Gumanti 106'	Report	Diego Banowo 44'; Ahmad Maulana 111'

Cibinong Mini Stadium, Bogor Regency
Referee: Yoko Suprianto (Indonesia)

**Adhyaksa Farmel**	**Persibo**

GK	1	(Indonesia) Bufon Dwi
RB	88	(Indonesia) Rizza Fadillah
CB	23	(Indonesia) Deno Risqy
CB	32	(Indonesia) Tabroni
LB	5	(Indonesia) Harly Cahya
DM	18	(Indonesia) Ardi Ramdani
CM	9	(Indonesia) Dedi Hartono (c)
CM	6	(Indonesia) Zardan Aroby
RW	7	(Indonesia) Sehabudin Ahmad
LW	17	(Indonesia) Kadir Toyo
CF	27	(Indonesia) Firmansyah
Substitutions:
GK	81	(Indonesia) Rizki Kusni
MF	2	(Indonesia) Ahmad Maulana
DF	3	(Indonesia) Sheva Maulana
DF	4	(Indonesia) Jufanov Gumanti
MF	8	(Indonesia) Egi Melgiansyah
MF	11	(Indonesia) Dede Aldiansyah
FW	21	(Indonesia) Iqbal
FW	28	(Indonesia) Andri Febriansyah
MF	29	(Indonesia) Reza Pahlevi
FW	91	(Indonesia) Putra Nugraha
Manager:
Ade Suhendra

GK	1	(Indonesia) Nur Ikhsan
RB	23	(Indonesia) Risco Herlambang
CB	22	(Indonesia) Munhar (c)
CB	4	(Indonesia) Rizki Dwi
LB	16	(Indonesia) Khairul Anam
CM	14	(Indonesia) Fatah Aji
CM	7	(Indonesia) Robbi Kriswantoro
AM	25	(Indonesia) Ananda Dhea
RW	8	(Indonesia) Taufiq Hidayat
LW	15	(Indonesia) Gunawan Cahyo
CF	9	(Indonesia) Diego Banowo
Substitutions:
GK	2	(Indonesia) Karlos Wister
DF	6	(Indonesia) I Made Tri Somanada
MF	10	(Indonesia) Ricga
DF	13	(Indonesia) Yudha Firdanna
DF	18	(Indonesia) Fajar Fathoni
MF	19	(Indonesia) Dhiyaz Saputra
MF	21	(Indonesia) Dzakwan Mangawiang
MF	26	(Indonesia) Irsyad Furqoni
MF	29	(Indonesia) Fajar Mubaroqi
FW	30	(Indonesia) Farid Fauzi
Manager:
I Putu Gede

Man of the Match:

Assistant referees:
Antonius Awang (Indonesia)
M. Sudrajat Ainul (Indonesia)
Fourth official:
Nugroho Supriyanto (Indonesia)

**Match rules**

- 90 minutes
- 30 minutes of extra time if tied on aggregate and away goals
- Penalty shoot-out if still tied after extra time (no away goals rule applied)
- Ten named substitutes, of which up to five may be used, with a sixth allowed in extra time.

== Post-match ==
With this victory, Adhyaksa Farmel gained their first third-tier league title. In addition to the title, Adhyaksa Farmel also received two individual season awards. Sehabudin Ahmad was awarded as the Best Player, while Kadir Toyo became the Best Young Player.
