= 2023–24 Liga 3 West Sulawesi =

Tournament details
- Country: Indonesia
- Venue: 1
- Dates: 28 December 2023 – 13 January 2024
- Teams: 10

Final positions
- Champions: PS Polmas (1st title)
- Runners-up: PS Sandeq
- Qualified for: 2023–24 Liga 3 National phase

Tournament statistics
- Matches played: 19
- Goals scored: 52 (2.74 per match)

The 2023–24 Liga 3 West Sulawesi is the seventh edition of Liga 3 West Sulawesi organized by Asprov PSSI West Sulawesi.

This competition was attended by 10 clubs. The winner of this competition will advance to the national phase.

PS Sandeq is the defending champion after winning it in the 2021 season.

== Teams ==
2023–24 Liga 3 West Sulawesi was attended by 10 teams.

No.	Team	Location
1	Gasman	Majene Regency
2	Persema	Mamasa Regency
3	Taeso Putra	Mamuju Regency
4	Gastik	Pasangkayu Regency
5	PS Matra	Pasangkayu Regency
6	Sarudu	Pasangkayu Regency
7	Balanipa Mandar	Polewali Mandar Regency
8	Mandar United	Polewali Mandar Regency
9	PS Polmas	Polewali Mandar Regency
10	PS Sandeq	Polewali Mandar Regency

== Venue ==
- Salim Mengga Stadium, Polewali Mandar Regency

== First round ==
=== Group A ===
Pos	Team	Pld	W	D	L	GF	GA	GD	Pts	Qualification
1	PS Polmas	2	1	1	0	2	1	+1	4	Advance to the Knockout Round
2	Gastik	2	1	0	1	2	2	0	3	Advance to the Knockout Round
3	PS Taeso Putra	2	0	1	1	2	3	−1	1	Advance to the Knockout Round

Source: 2023 Liga 3 West Sulawesi
28 December 2023
16.00 WITA

Gastik	2–1	PS Taeso Putra
	Report

Salim Mengga Stadium, Polewali Mandar Regency

30 December 2023
14.00 WITA

PS Taeso Putra	1–1	PS Polmas
	Report

Salim Mengga Stadium, Polewali Mandar Regency

4 January 2023
14.00 WITA (Note: The PS Polmas vs Gastik match was originally scheduled for 2 January 2024 at 15.45 WITA, was rescheduled due to bad weather reasons to 4 January 2024 at 14.00 WITA.)

PS Polmas	1–0	Gastik
	Report

Salim Mengga Stadium, Polewali Mandar Regency

=== Group B ===
Pos	Team	Pld	W	D	L	GF	GA	GD	Pts	Qualification
1	PS Matra	2	2	0	0	5	1	+4	6	Advance to the Knockout Round
2	Persema Mamasa	2	1	0	1	6	5	+1	3	Advance to the Knockout Round
3	Balanipa Mandar	2	0	0	2	3	8	−5	0	

Source: 2023 Liga 3 West Sulawesi
30 December 2023
15.45 WITA

PS Matra	2–1	Persema Mamasa
	Report

Salim Mengga Stadium, Polewali Mandar Regency

2 January 2023
14.00 WITA

Balanipa Mandar	3–5	Persema Mamasa
	Report

Salim Mengga Stadium, Polewali Mandar Regency

4 January 2023
15.45 WITA

Balanipa Mandar	0–3	PS Matra
	Report

Salim Mengga Stadium, Polewali Mandar Regency

=== Group C ===
Pos	Team	Pld	W	D	L	GF	GA	GD	Pts	Qualification
1	PS Sandeq	3	2	0	1	7	2	+5	6 (Note: Head-to-head result: Sarudu 0–2 PS Sandeq.)	Advance to the Knockout Round
2	Sarudu	3	2	0	1	4	4	0	6	Advance to the Knockout Round
3	Mandar United	3	1	1	1	4	4	0	4	Advance to the Knockout Round
4	Gasman	3	0	1	2	4	9	−5	1	

Source: 2023 Liga 3 West Sulawesi
Notes:
29 December 2023
14.00 WITA

Gasman	2–2	Mandar United
	Report

Salim Mengga Stadium, Polewali Mandar Regency
29 December 2023
15.45 WITA

Sarudu	0–2	PS Sandeq
	Report

Salim Mengga Stadium, Polewali Mandar Regency

31 December 2023
14.00 WITA

PS Sandeq	4–0	Gasman
	Report

Salim Mengga Stadium, Polewali Mandar Regency
31 December 2023
15.45 WITA

Mandar United	0–1	Sarudu
	Report

Salim Mengga Stadium, Polewali Mandar Regency

3 January 2023
14.00 WITA

PS Sandeq	1–2	Mandar United
	Report

Salim Mengga Stadium, Polewali Mandar Regency
3 January 2023
15.45 WITA

Gasman	2–3	Sarudu
	Report

Salim Mengga Stadium, Polewali Mandar Regency

=== Ranking of Third-placed Teams ===
Pos	Grp	Team	Pld	W	D	L	GF	GA	GD	Pts	Qualification
1	C	Mandar United	2	1	0	1	2	2	0	3	Qualified to Knockout Round
2	A	PS Taeso Putra	2	0	1	1	2	3	−1	1	Qualified to Knockout Round
3	B	Balanipa Mandar	2	0	0	2	3	8	−5	0	

Source: 2023 Liga 3 West Sulawesi

== Knockout round ==
=== Bracket ===
Quarter-finals
6 January 2023 – Polewali Mandar
A1	PS Polmas	2
C2	Sarudu	0
7 January 2023 – Polewali Mandar
B1	PS Matra	3
A3	PS Taeso Putra	0
8 January 2023 – Polewali Mandar
C1	PS Sandeq	2
A2	Gastik	0
9 January 2023 – Polewali Mandar
B2	Persema Mamasa	1 (3)
C3	Mandar United (p)	1 (4)

Semi-finals
10 January 2023 – Polewali Mandar
PS Polmas (p)	0 (3)
PS Matra	0 (1)
11 January 2023 – Polewali Mandar
PS Sandeq	1
Mandar United	0

Final
13 January 2023 – Polewali Mandar
PS Polmas	3
PS Sandeq	0

=== Quarter-finals ===
6 January 2023
14.45 WITA

PS Polmas	2–0	Sarudu
	Report

Salim Mengga Stadium, Polewali Mandar Regency

7 January 2023
14.45 WITA

PS Matra	3–0	PS Taeso Putra
	Report

Salim Mengga Stadium, Polewali Mandar Regency

8 January 2023
14.45 WITA

PS Sandeq	2–0	Gastik
	Report

Salim Mengga Stadium, Polewali Mandar Regency

9 January 2023
14.45 WITA

Persema Mamasa	1–1 (a.e.t.)	Mandar United
	Report
Penalties
	3–4

Salim Mengga Stadium, Polewali Mandar Regency

=== Semi-finals ===
10 January 2023
14.45 WITA

PS Polmas	0–0 (a.e.t.)	PS Matra
	Report
Penalties
	3–1

Salim Mengga Stadium, Polewali Mandar Regency

11 January 2023
14.45 WITA

PS Sandeq	1–0	Mandar United
	Report

Salim Mengga Stadium, Polewali Mandar Regency

=== Final ===
13 January 2023
14.45 WITA

PS Polmas	3–0	PS Sandeq
	Report

Salim Mengga Stadium, Polewali Mandar Regency

== Qualification to the national phase ==
Team	Method of qualification	Date of qualification	Qualified to
PS Polmas	2023–24 Liga 3 West Sulawesi champions	13 January 2024	2023–24 Liga 3 National Phase

== See also ==
- 2023–24 Liga 3 National phase
- 2023 Liga 3 South Sulawesi
- 2023 Liga 3 Southeast Sulawesi
- 2023 Liga 3 Central Sulawesi
- 2023 Liga 3 Gorontalo
- 2023 Liga 3 North Sulawesi
