= MBS United F.C. =

Indonesian football club

MBS United
- Full name: Madani Berkisa Sejati United Football Club
- Short name: MBS
- Founded: 26 November 2021; 4 years ago
- Ground: Temenggung Abdul Jamal Stadium; Batam, Riau Islands
- Capacity: 2,800
- Head coach: I Gusti Ketut Sudiana
- League: Liga 4
- 2023–24: 2nd, (Riau Islands zone); 4th in Group A, (National round)
Home colours	Away colours

Madani Berkisa Sejati United Football Club, commonly known as MBS United, is an Indonesian professional football club based in the Batam, Riau Islands. They currently compete in the Liga 4.

== Honours ==
- Liga 3 Riau Islands
  - Runner-up (1): 2023
