= Sarudu F.C. =

Association football team in Indonesia

Sarudu
- Full name: Sarudu Football Club
- Nicknames: Laskar Sarudu (Sarudu Warriors)
- Founded: 2021; 5 years ago
- Ground: Gelora Djiwa Stadium; Pasangkayu, West Sulawesi
- Capacity: 1,000
- Owner: Askab PSSI Pasangkayu
- Manager: Irpandi Yaumil
- Coach: Arfan
- League: Liga 3
- 2023: Quarterfinals, (West Sulawesi zone)
Home colours	Away colours

Sarudu Football Club (simply known as Sarudu) is an Indonesian football club based in Pasangkayu, West Sulawesi. They currently compete in the Liga 4 West Sulawesi zone.
