= 2024–25 Liga 4 Southeast Sulawesi =

Liga 4 Southeast Sulawesi
- Season: 2024–25
- Dates: 16–28 February 2025
- Champions: UHO MZF (1st title)
- National phase: UHO MZF
- Matches: 27
- Goals: 93 (3.44 per match)

The 2024–25 Liga 4 Southeast Sulawesi will be the inaugural season of Liga 4 Southeast Sulawesi after the structural changes of Indonesian football competition and serves as a qualifying round for the national phase of the 2024–25 Liga 4. The competition will be organised by the Southeast Sulawesi Provincial PSSI Association.

== Teams ==
=== Participating teams ===
A total of 8 teams are competing in this season.

No	Team	Location	2023 season
1	Selaras	North Konawe Regency	—
2	Gevira	Kendari City	—
3	Kendari United	Kendari City	—
4	Tiger Sultra	Kendari City	Second round (3rd in Mainland region)
5	UHO MZF	Kendari City	Champions
6	Wawonii Putra	Konawe Islands Regency	—
7	PS Wonua Bombana	Bombana Regency	Runner-up
8	Gulamastar	Central Buton Regency	—

== Group stage ==
A total of 8 teams will be drawn into two groups of four. The group stage will be played in a home tournament format of single round-robin matches.

The top two teams of each group will qualify for the knockout stage.

=== Group A ===
All matches will be held at UHO Mini Stadium, Kendari.

Pos	Team	Pld	W	D	L	GF	GA	GD	Pts	Qualification	MZF	GEV	KUN	TGR
1	UHO MZF	6	6	0	0	22	2	+20	18	Qualification to the Knockout stage	—	2–1	4–0	5–1
2	Gevira	6	3	0	3	8	9	−1	9	Qualification to the Knockout stage	0–2	—	1–0	1–2
3	Kendari United	6	1	1	4	7	15	−8	4		0–4	2–3	—	3–1
4	Tiger Sultra	6	1	1	4	7	18	−11	4		0–5	1–2	2–2	—

Source: Liga 4 Southeast Sulawesi
Rules for classification: 1) Points; 2) Head-to-head points; 3) Head-to-head goal difference; 4) Head-to-head goals scored; 5) Goal difference; 6) Goals scored; 7) Fair-play points; 8) Draw.

=== Group B ===
All matches will be held at UHO Mini Stadium, Kendari.

Pos	Team	Pld	W	D	L	GF	GA	GD	Pts	Qualification	WON	GUL	WAW	SEL
1	PS Wonua Bombana	6	3	3	0	13	1	+12	12	Qualification to the Knockout stage	—	0–0	3–0	6–0
2	Gulamastar	6	2	4	0	11	4	+7	10	Qualification to the Knockout stage	0–0	—	1–1	3–0
3	Wawonii Putra	6	1	4	1	9	9	0	7		1–1	3–3	—	3–0
4	Selaras	6	0	1	5	1	20	−19	1		0–3	0–4	1–1	—

Updated to match(es) played on 23 February 2025. Source: Liga 4 Southeast Sulawesi
Rules for classification: 1) Points; 2) Head-to-head points; 3) Head-to-head goal difference; 4) Head-to-head goals scored; 5) Goal difference; 6) Goals scored; 7) Fair-play points; 8) Draw.

== Knockout stage ==
The knockout stage will be played as a single match. If tied after regulation time, extra time and, if necessary, a penalty shoot-out will be used to decide the winning team.

=== Bracket ===
Semi-finals
27 February 2025 — Kendari
A1	UHO MZF	7
B2	Gulamastar	1
27 February 2025 — Kendari
B1	PS Wonua Bombana	4
A2	Gevira	2

Final
28 February 2025 — Kendari
UHO MZF	1
PS Wonua Bombana	0

=== Semi-finals ===
27 February 2025
13:45 UTC+8

UHO MZF	7–1	Gulamastar
	Report

UHO Mini Stadium, Kendari

27 February 2025
15:35 UTC+8

PS Wonua Bombana	4–2	Gevira
	Report

UHO Mini Stadium, Kendari

=== Final ===
28 February 2025
15:00 UTC+8

UHO MZF	1–0	PS Wonua Bombana
	Report

UHO Mini Stadium, Kendari

== See also ==
- 2024–25 Liga 4
