= 2023–24 Liga 3 South Sumatra =

Tournament details
- Country: Indonesia
- Venue: 1
- Dates: 1 – 6 March 2024
- Teams: 4

Final positions
- Champions: PS Palembang (3rd title)
- Runners-up: Bhayangkara Sriwijaya
- Qualified for: 2023–24 Liga 3 National phase

Tournament statistics
- Matches played: 8
- Goals scored: 28 (3.5 per match)
- All statistics correct as of 6 March 2024.

The 2023–24 Liga 3 South Sumatra is the fifth edition of Liga 3 South Sumatra organized by Asprov PSSI South Sumatra. This competition was attended by 4 clubs. The winner of this competition will advance to the national phase.

Persimuba is the defending champion after winning it in the 2022–23 season.

== Teams ==
2023–24 Liga 3 South Sumatra was attended by 4 teams.

No.	Team	Location
1	Persimuba Musi Banyuasin	Musi Banyuasin Regency
2	Bhayangkara Sriwijaya	Palembang City
3	David	Palembang City
4	PS Palembang	Palembang City

== Venue ==
- Jasdam II/Sriwijaya Stadium, Palembang City

== Group stage ==
Pos	Team	Pld	W	D	L	GF	GA	GD	Pts	Qualification
1	PS Palembang	3	2	1	0	8	5	+3	7	Advance to the Knockout stage
2	Bhayangkara Sriwijaya	3	1	2	0	3	2	+1	5	Advance to the Knockout stage
3	David	3	1	1	1	5	5	0	4	
4	Persimuba	3	0	0	3	3	7	−4	0	

Source: Asprov PSSI South Sumatra
1 March 2024
13:45 WIB

PS Palembang	4–3	David
	Report

Jasdam II/Sriwijaya Stadium, Palembang City
1 March 2024
16:00 WIB

Bhayangkara Sriwijaya	2–1	Persimuba
	Report

Jasdam II/Sriwijaya Stadium, Palembang City

2 March 2024
07:30 WIB

Bhayangkara Sriwijaya	1–1	PS Palembang
	Report

Jasdam II/Sriwijaya Stadium, Palembang City
2 March 2024
09:45 WIB

Persimuba	1–2	David
	Report

Jasdam II/Sriwijaya Stadium, Palembang City

4 March 2024
13:30 WIB

David	0–0	Bhayangkara Sriwijaya
	Report

Jasdam II/Sriwijaya Stadium, Palembang City
4 March 2024
15:45 WIB

PS Palembang	3–1	Persimuba
	Report

Jasdam II/Sriwijaya Stadium, Palembang City

== Knockout stage ==
=== Summary ===
The first leg will be played on 5 March 2024, and the second leg will be played on 6 March 2024.

Team 1	Agg.	Team 2	1st leg	2nd leg
PS Palembang	7–2	Bhayangkara Sriwijaya	3–1	4–1

=== Final ===
5 March 2024
15:00 WIB

PS Palembang	3–1	Bhayangkara Sriwijaya
	Report

Jasdam II/Sriwijaya Stadium, Palembang City

6 March 2024
15:00 WIB

Bhayangkara Sriwijaya	1–4	PS Palembang
	Report

Jasdam II/Sriwijaya Stadium, Palembang City

PS Palembang won 7–2 on aggregate.

== Qualification to the national phase ==
Free slot

Team	Method of qualification	Date of qualification	Qualified to
Persimuba	Champions of 2022–23 Liga 3 South Sumatra	6 February 2023	2023–24 Liga 3 National Phase

2023–24 season

Team	Method of qualification	Date of qualification	Qualified to
PS Palembang	Champions of 2023–24 Liga 3 South Sumatra	6 March 2024	2023–24 Liga 3 National Phase

== See also ==
- 2023–24 Liga 3 National phase
