= PS Polmas (2023) =

Indonesian football club

- Full name: Persatuan Sepakbola Polewali Mandar dan Sekitar
- Nickname: Burung Mandar Dengkur (Celebes rail)
- Short name: Polmas
- Founded: 2023; 3 years ago
- Ground: Gaspol Football Field; Polewali Mandar
- Capacity: 1,000
- Owner: PSSI Polewali Mandar
- Coach: Azhar Darno
- League: Liga 4
- 2023–24: 1st, (West Sulawesi Zone); 3rd in Group I, (National)
| Home colours | Away colours |

Persatuan Sepakbola Polewali Mandar dan Sekitar, commonly known as PS Polmas, is an Indonesian football club based in Polewali Mandar, West Sulawesi. They currently compete in the Liga 4 West Sulawesi zone.

== Honours ==
- Liga 3 West Sulawesi
  - Champion (1): 2023
