= Morotai United F.C. =

Association football team in Indonesia

Morotai United
- Full name: Morotai United Football Club
- Nickname: Gorango Morotai (Morotai Whalesharks)
- Short name: MU
- Founded: 2019; 7 years ago
- Ground: Gelora Merah Putih Stadium; Morotai Island, North Maluku
- Capacity: 2,000
- Owner: PSSI Morotai Island Regency
- Chairman: Muhammad Umar Ali
- Manager: Mahmud Kiat
- Coach: Alfian Rifai
- League: Liga 3
- 2023–24: 4th in Group B, (National)
Home colours	Away colours

Morotai United Football Club (simply known as Morotai United or MU) is an Indonesian football club based in Morotai Island, North Maluku. They currently compete in the Liga 3.

== Honours ==
- Liga 3 North Maluku
  - Champion (1): 2022
  - Runner-up (1): 2021
