= 2023 Liga 3 Southeast Sulawesi =

Tournament details
- Country: Indonesia
- Venue: 2
- Dates: 10 – 29 December 2023
- Teams: 10

Final positions
- Champions: UHO MZF (2nd title)
- Runners-up: PS Wonua Bombana
- Qualified for: 2023–24 Liga 3 National phase

The 2023 Liga 3 Southeast Sulawesi is the fifth edition of Liga 3 Southeast Sulawesi organized by Asprov PSSI Southeast Sulawesi.

This competition was attended by 11 clubs. The winner of this competition will advance to the national phase.

Gasko is the defending champion after winning it in the 2021 season.

== Teams ==
2023 Liga 3 Southeast Sulawesi was attended by 11 teams.

No.	Team	Location
Mainland Region
1	PS Wonua Bombana	Bombana Regency
2	Tiger Sultra	Kendari City
3	UHO MZF	Kendari City
4	PS Morosi Utama	Konawe Regency
5	PS Padangguni	Konawe Regency
6	PS Konut Putra	North Konawe Regency
Islands Region
1	Buteng United	Central Buton Regency
2	PS Satria Wakumoro	Muna Regency
3	PS Tongkuno Raya	Muna Regency
4	PS Muna Barat	West Muna Regency

== Venues ==
- Bombana Mini Stadium, Bombana Regency
- Manguntara Wakuru Field, Muna Regency

== First round ==
=== Mainland Region ===
Group A

Pos	Team	Pld	W	D	L	GF	GA	GD	Pts	Qualification	MZF	WON	MOR
1	UHO MZF	2	2	0	0	9	2	+7	6	Advance to the Second Round	—	3–2	
2	PS Wonua Bombana (H)	2	0	1	1	2	3	−1	1	Advance to the Second Round		—	0–0
3	PS Morosi Utama	2	0	1	1	0	6	−6	1		0–6		—

Source: Asprov PSSI Southeast Sulawesi
Legend: Blue = home team win; Yellow = draw; Red = away team win.
(H) Hosts

Group B

Pos	Team	Pld	W	D	L	GF	GA	GD	Pts	Qualification	TGR	KNT	PDG
1	Tiger Sultra	2	2	0	0	6	1	+5	6	Advance to the Second Round	—		3–0 (Note: Tiger Sultra were awarded a 3–0 win over PS Padangguni.)
2	PS Konut Putra	2	1	0	1	8	4	+4	3	Advance to the Second Round	1–3	—	
3	PS Padangguni	2	0	0	2	1	10	−9	0			1–7	—

Source: Asprov PSSI Southeast Sulawesi
Legend: Blue = home team win; Yellow = draw; Red = away team win.

=== Islands Region ===
Pos	Team	Pld	W	D	L	GF	GA	GD	Pts	Qualification	BUN	WKM	TKN	MBR
1	Buteng United	6	3	1	2	11	7	+4	10	Advance to the Knockout Round	—	1–2	2–1	3–1
2	PS Satria Wakumoro	6	2	3	1	8	7	+1	9	Advance to the Knockout Round	2–2	—	1–0	2–2
3	PS Tongkuno Raya (H)	6	3	0	3	4	4	0	9		1–0	1–0	—	1–0
4	PS Muna Barat	6	1	2	3	5	10	−5	5		0–3	1–1	1–0	—

Updated to match(es) played on 18 December 2023. Source: Asprov PSSI Southeast Sulawesi
Legend: Blue = home team win; Yellow = draw; Red = away team win.
(H) Hosts

== Second round ==
=== Mainland Region ===
Pos	Team	Pld	W	D	L	GF	GA	GD	Pts	Qualification	MZF	WON	TGR	KNT
1	UHO MZF	4	3	1	0	11	0	+11	10	Advance to the Knockout Round	—		4–0	4–0
2	PS Wonua Bombana (H)	5	4	1	0	10	3	+7	13	Advance to the Knockout Round	0–0	—	2–0	3–0
3	Tiger Sultra	5	1	0	4	8	13	−5	3		0–3	2–3	—	6–1
4	PS Konut Putra	4	0	0	4	2	15	−13	0			1–2		—

Updated to match(es) played on 23 December 2023. Source: Asprov PSSI Southeast Sulawesi
Legend: Blue = home team win; Yellow = draw; Red = away team win.
(H) Hosts

== Knockout round ==
=== Bracket ===
Semi-finals
27 December 2023 – Bombana
UHO MZF	2
PS Satria Wakumoro	1
27 December 2023 – Bombana
Buteng United	1
PS Wonua Bombana	4

Final
29 December 2023 – Bombana
UHO MZF	2
PS Wonua Bombana	0

=== Semi-finals ===
27 December 2023
13.45 WITA

UHO MZF	2–1	PS Satria Wakumoro
	Report

Bombana Mini Stadium, Bombana Regency

27 December 2023
15.45 WITA

Buteng United	1–4	PS Wonua Bombana
	Report

Bombana Mini Stadium, Bombana Regency

=== Final ===
29 December 2023
15.00 WITA

UHO MZF	2–0	PS Wonua Bombana
	Report

Bombana Mini Stadium, Bombana Regency

== Qualification to the national phase ==
Team	Method of qualification	Date of qualification	Qualified to
UHO MZF	2023 Liga 3 Southeast Sulawesi champions	29 December 2023	2023–24 Liga 3 National Phase

== See also ==
- 2023–24 Liga 3 National phase
