= UHO MZF F.C. =

Indonesian football club

UHO MZF
- Full name: Universitas Halu Oleo Muhammad Zamrun Firihu Football Club
- Nickname(s): Laskar Haluoleo
- Short name: UHO
- Founded: 2015; 10 years ago
- Ground: UHO Mini Stadium; Kendari; Southeast Sulawesi
- Capacity: 10,000
- Owner: Haluoleo University
- Chairman: Muhammad Zamrun Firihu
- Manager: La Ode Asfayadin Alidin
- Coach: Jumilianto
- League: Liga 4
- 2024–25: 1st, (Southeast Sulawesi Zone); First round, 4th in Group O (National phase)
Home colours	Away colours

Universitas Halu Oleo Muhammad Zamrun Firihu Football Club (simply known as UHO MZF FC) is an Indonesian football club based in Kendari, Southeast Sulawesi. They currently compete in the Liga 4 Southeast Sulawesi zone.

== Honours ==
=== League ===
- ISC Liga Nusantara Southeast Sulawesi
  - Champion (1): 2016
- Liga 3 Southeast Sulawesi
  - Champion (1): 2023
- Liga 4 Southeast Sulawesi
  - Champion (1): 2024–25

=== Cup ===
- UAD Rector Cup
  - Winner (1): 2023
