= Diego Banowo =

Indonesian association football player

Personal information
- Full name: Diego Banowo Bagus Sadewo
- Date of birth: 24 November 1991 (age 34)
- Place of birth: Surakarta, Indonesia
- Height: 1.77 m (5 ft 10 in)
- Position: Forward

Team information
- Current team: PPSM Magelang
- Number: 9

Youth career
- Persis Solo

Senior career*
Years	Team	Apps	(Gls)
2010–2012	Persis Solo	13	(1)
2014	Persijap Jepara	3	(0)
2015–2016	PSS Sleman	0	(0)
2017	PS Bengkulu	4	(0)
2018–2019	Persita Tangerang	37	(9)
2020	Persela Lamongan	2	(0)
2021	PSMS Medan	0	(0)
2021	PSG Pati	2	(0)
2022	PSIM Yogyakarta	3	(0)
2023–2024	Persibo Bojonegoro	7	(7)
2024–2025	Persikab Bandung	11	(3)
2025–	PPSM Magelang	4	(0)
- * Club domestic league appearances and goals as of 14 January 2026

Diego Banowo Bagus Sadewo (born 24 November 1991), is an Indonesian professional footballer who plays as a forward for Liga 4 club PPSM Magelang.

== Club career ==
=== Persita Tangerang ===
In 2018, Diego signed a year contract with Persita Tangerang. Diego scored 8 goals in the 2018 season, when Persita played in the second division.

=== Persela Lamongan ===
He was signed for Persela Lamongan to play in Liga 1 in the 2020 season. Banowo made his league debut on 7 March 2020 in a match against PSIS Semarang at the Surajaya Stadium, Lamongan. This season was suspended on 27 March 2020 due to the COVID-19 pandemic. The season was abandoned and was declared void on 20 January 2021.

=== PSMS Medan ===
In 2021, Banowo signed a contract with Indonesian Liga 2 club PSMS Medan.

=== PSG Pati ===
In July 2021, Banowo confirmed his transfer to Liga 2 club PSG Pati. He made his league debut on 24 November 2021 in a match against PSIM Yogyakarta at the Manahan Stadium, Surakarta.

== Honours ==
=== Club ===
Persita Tangerang

- Liga 2 runner-up: 2019

Persibo Bojonegoro

- Liga 3 East Java Champions: 2023–24
