= 2023–24 Liga 3 Central Sulawesi =

Tournament details
- Country: Indonesia
- Venue: 2
- Dates: 26 February – 10 March 2024
- Teams: 8

Final positions
- Champions: Bandar Sulteng (1st title)
- Runners-up: PS Bintang Timur Taipa
- Qualified for: 2023–24 Liga 3 National phase

Tournament statistics
- Matches played: 15
- Goals scored: 36 (2.4 per match)

The 2023–24 Liga 3 Central Sulawesi is the sixth edition of Liga 3 Central Sulawesi organized by Asprov PSSI Central Sulawesi. This competition was attended by 8 clubs. The winner of this competition will advance to the national phase.

Persipal Youth is the defending champion after winning it in the 2022 season.

== Teams ==
2023–24 Liga 3 Central Sulawesi was attended by 8 teams.

No.	Team	Location
1	Bandar Sulteng	Donggala Regency
2	PS Bintang Timur Taipa	Palu City
3	Celebest	Palu City
4	Garda Yustitia Sulteng	Palu City
5	Persipal Youth	Palu City
6	Persipar Parigi	Parigi Moutong Regency
7	Sahib Parimo	Parigi Moutong Regency
8	Persito Tolitoli	Tolitoli Regency

== Venues ==
- Gawalise Stadium, Palu
- Faqih Rasyid Field, Palu

== First round ==
=== Group A ===
Pos	Team	Pld	W	D	L	GF	GA	GD	Pts	Qualification	BST	BTT	GYS	CLB
1	Bandar Sulteng	3	2	1	0	6	1	+5	7	Advance to the Knockout Round	—		4–0	
2	PS Bintang Timur Taipa	3	1	2	0	3	2	+1	5	Advance to the Knockout Round	0–0	—		
3	Garda Yustitia Sulteng	3	1	1	1	2	5	−3	4			1–1	—	1–0
4	Celebest	3	0	0	3	2	5	−3	0		1–2	1–2		—

Source: 2023–24 Liga 3 Central Sulawesi

=== Group B ===
Pos	Team	Pld	W	D	L	GF	GA	GD	Pts	Qualification	PPY	PRG	TOL	SAH
1	Persipal Youth	3	2	1	0	6	0	+6	7	Advance to the Knockout Round	—		0–0	3–0
2	Persipar	3	2	0	1	4	3	+1	6	Advance to the Knockout Round	0–3	—	1–0	3–0
3	Persito	3	1	1	1	3	1	+2	4				—	3–0
4	Sahib Parimo	3	0	0	3	0	9	−9	0					—

Source: 2023–24 Liga 3 Central Sulawesi

== Knockout round ==
=== Bracket ===
Semi-finals
4 March 2024 – Palu
A1	Bandar Sulteng	5
B2	Persipar	1
7 March 2024 – Palu
B1	Persipal Youth	1
A2	PS Bintang Timur Taipa	3

Final
10 March 2024 – Palu
Bandar Sulteng (p)	0 (4)
PS Bintang Timur Taipa	0 (3)

=== Semi-finals ===
4 March 2024

Bandar Sulteng	5–1	Persipar
	Report

Faqih Rasyid Field, Palu City

7 March 2024

Persipal Youth	1–3	PS Bintang Timur Taipa
	Report

Faqih Rasyid Field, Palu City

=== Final ===
10 March 2024
14:30 WITA

Bandar Sulteng	0–0 (a.e.t.)	PS Bintang Timur Taipa
	Report
Penalties
	4–3

Faqih Rasyid Field, Palu City

== Qualification to the national phase ==
Free slot

Team	Method of qualification	Date of qualification	Qualified to
Persipal Youth	2022 Liga 3 Central Sulawesi champions	24 February 2023	2023–24 Liga 3 National Phase

2023–24 season

Team	Method of qualification	Date of qualification	Qualified to
Bandar Sulteng	2023–24 Liga 3 Central Sulawesi champions	10 March 2024	2023–24 Liga 3 National Phase

== See also ==
- 2023–24 Liga 3 National phase
- 2023 Liga 3 Southeast Sulawesi
- 2023–24 Liga 3 South Sulawesi
- 2023–24 Liga 3 West Sulawesi
- 2023–24 Liga 3 Gorontalo
- 2023–24 Liga 3 North Sulawesi
