= 2021 Liga 3 Central Sulawesi =

Tournament details
- Dates: 20 October–18 November 2021
- Teams: 17

Final positions
- Champions: Persipal Palu (2nd title)
- Runners-up: Bandar Sulteng
- Third place: Palu Putra
- Fourth place: PSNB Nupabomba

Tournament statistics
- Matches played: 70
- Goals scored: 232 (3.31 per match)

The 2021 Liga 3 Central Sulawesi will be the sixth season of Liga 3 Central Sulawesi as a qualifying round for the national round of the 2021–22 Liga 3.

Pestu Tojo Una-Una were the defending champion.

== Teams ==
There are 17 teams participated in the league this season.

Teams	Location
Bandar Sulteng	Palu
Buol United	Buol
Celebest	Palu
Garuda Yaksa	Donggala
Kramat Jaya	Palu
Palu Putra	Palu
Persbul	Buol
Persido	Donggala
Persipal	Palu
Persipar	Parigi Moutong
Persipera	Banggai Islands
Persittimo	Parigi Moutong
Persito	Tolitoli
Pestu	Tojo Una-Una
PS Tisswan Labuan	Donggala
PSNB	Donggala
Rajawali United	Morowali

== Venue ==
All matches will held in Gawalise Stadium, Palu.

== Group stage ==
=== Group A ===
Pos	Team	Pld	W	D	L	GF	GA	GD	Pts	Qualification
1	Persipal	7	4	3	0	24	5	+19	15	Advanced to Final round
2	Palu Putra	7	4	3	0	20	6	+14	15	Advanced to Final round
3	Celebest	7	4	2	1	19	1	+18	14	
4	Persipar	7	2	3	2	8	14	−6	9	
5	PS Tisswan Labuan	7	2	2	3	8	8	0	8	
6	Kramat Jaya	7	1	3	3	9	15	−6	6	
7	Buol United	7	1	3	3	8	22	−14	6	
8	Garuda Yaksa	7	0	1	6	2	27	−25	1	

Source: Liga 3 Sulawesi Tengah 2021

=== Group B ===
Pos	Team	Pld	W	D	L	GF	GA	GD	Pts	Qualification
1	Bandar Sulteng	8	7	0	1	14	7	+7	21	Advanced to Final round
2	PSNB	8	5	1	2	22	9	+13	16	Advanced to Final round
3	Rajawali United	8	5	0	3	15	10	+5	15	
4	Persbul	8	4	2	2	16	13	+3	14	
5	Persittimo	8	4	1	3	15	12	+3	13	
6	Persipera	8	2	2	4	8	13	−5	8	
7	Pestu	8	2	1	5	9	19	−10	7	
8	Persito	8	1	2	5	8	13	−5	5	
9	Persido	8	1	1	6	9	20	−11	4	

Source: Liga 3 Sulawesi Tengah 2021

== Final round ==
Pos	Team	Pld	W	D	L	GF	GA	GD	Pts	Qualification
1	Persipal	3	2	1	0	5	1	+4	7	Champion and Qualified to National round
2	Bandar Sulteng	3	2	0	1	6	5	+1	6	
3	Palu Putra	3	1	1	1	5	5	0	4	
4	PSNB	3	0	0	3	2	7	−5	0	

Updated to match(es) played on 18 November 2021. Source: Liga 3 Sulawesi Tengah 2021
