= 2022 Liga 3 Central Sulawesi =

Tournament details
- Country: Indonesia
- Dates: 1 October 2022
- Teams: 17

Final positions
- Champions: Persipal Youth
- Qualified for: 2022 Liga 3 National Round

Tournament statistics
- Matches played: 5
- Goals scored: 19 (3.8 per match)

The 2022 Liga 3 Central Sulawesi is the fifth edition of Liga 3 Central Sulawesi organized by Asprov PSSI Central Sulawesi.

Followed by 17 clubs. The winner of this competition will immediately advance to the national round.

Persipal Palu is the defending champion after winning it in the 2021 season.

== Teams ==
2022 Liga 3 Central Sulawesi was attended by 17 teams from regencies and cities in Central Sulawesi who registered with the Asprov PSSI Central Sulawesi.

| Team | Location |
|---|---|
| Persittimo (host) | Parigi Moutong Regency |
| Persema | Parigi Moutong Regency |
| Persipar | Parigi Moutong Regency |
| Persmo | Parigi Moutong Regency |
| Sahib Parimo | Parigi Moutong Regency |
| Bandar Sulteng | Donggala Regency |
| PSNB | Donggala Regency |
| PS Tisswan Labuan | Donggala Regency |
| Persigi | Sigi Regency |
| Persibal (host) | Banggai Regency |
| Persikol | North Morowali Regency |
| Celebest | Palu City |
| Kramat Jaya | Palu City |
| Palu Putra | Palu City |
| Persipal | Palu City |
| Samudera Pantoloan | Palu City |

== Venues ==
This season's Liga 3 Central Sulawesi matches were held at 2 stadiums in 2 regencies.

- Gelora Samsurizal Tombolotutu Stadium, Parigi Moutong Regency
- Kilongan Stadium, Banggai Regency

== Group stage ==
=== Group A ===
| Pos | Team | Pld | W | D | L | GF | GA | GD | Pts | Qualification | PMO | SHB | PNB | PGI | PLU | BSG | BUO | KRT | PMA |
|---|---|---|---|---|---|---|---|---|---|---|---|---|---|---|---|---|---|---|---|
| 1 | Persittimo (H) | 1 | 1 | 0 | 0 | 3 | 0 | +3 | 3 | Advance to Knockout Stage | — | | | | | | | | 3–0 |
| 2 | Sahib Parimo | 0 | 0 | 0 | 0 | 0 | 0 | 0 | 0 | Advance to Knockout Stage | | — | | | | | | | |
| 3 | PSNB | 0 | 0 | 0 | 0 | 0 | 0 | 0 | 0 | | | | — | | | | | | |
| 4 | Persigi | 0 | 0 | 0 | 0 | 0 | 0 | 0 | 0 | | | | | — | | | | | |
| 5 | Palu Putra | 0 | 0 | 0 | 0 | 0 | 0 | 0 | 0 | | | | | | — | | | | |
| 6 | Bandar Sulteng | 0 | 0 | 0 | 0 | 0 | 0 | 0 | 0 | | | | | | | — | | | |
| 7 | Buol United | 0 | 0 | 0 | 0 | 0 | 0 | 0 | 0 | | | | | | | | — | | |
| 8 | Kramat Jaya | 0 | 0 | 0 | 0 | 0 | 0 | 0 | 0 | | | | | | | | | — | |
| 9 | Persema | 1 | 0 | 0 | 1 | 0 | 3 | −3 | 0 | | | | | | | | | | — |

Updated to match(es) played on unknown. Source: 2022 Liga 3 Central Sulawesi
(H) Hosts

=== Group B ===
| Pos | Team | Pld | W | D | L | GF | GA | GD | Pts | Qualification | PBL | CEL | PAL | SAM | TLA | PKL | PSO | PSR |
|---|---|---|---|---|---|---|---|---|---|---|---|---|---|---|---|---|---|---|
| 1 | Persibal (H) | 2 | 2 | 0 | 0 | 8 | 0 | +8 | 6 | Advance to Knockout Stage | — | | | | | | 5–0 | 3–0 |
| 2 | Celebest | 1 | 1 | 0 | 0 | 5 | 0 | +5 | 3 | Advance to Knockout Stage | | — | | | | | | 5–0 |
| 3 | Persipal | 1 | 1 | 0 | 0 | 2 | 1 | +1 | 3 | | | | — | | | | | |
| 4 | Samudera Pantoloan | 0 | 0 | 0 | 0 | 0 | 0 | 0 | 0 | | | | | — | | | | |
| 5 | PS Tisswan Labuan | 0 | 0 | 0 | 0 | 0 | 0 | 0 | 0 | | | | | | — | | | |
| 6 | Persikol | 1 | 0 | 0 | 1 | 1 | 2 | −1 | 0 | | | | 1–2 | | | — | | |
| 7 | Persmo | 1 | 0 | 0 | 1 | 0 | 5 | −5 | 0 | | | | | | | | — | |
| 8 | Persipar | 2 | 0 | 0 | 2 | 0 | 8 | −8 | 0 | | | | | | | | | — |

Updated to match(es) played on unknown. Source: 2022 Liga 3 Central Sulawesi
(H) Hosts

== Knockout stage ==
Wait for the completion of the group stage first.
