= Baniwa (disambiguation) =

Baniwa may refer to:

- Baniwa language, several languages of the Amazon with the name
- Baniwa people, an ethnic group of the Amazon
- Baniwa (moth), a genus of moths

== See also ==
- Banawa (disambiguation)
