= List of districts of Central Sulawesi =

The province of Central Sulawesi (Sulawesi Tengah) in Indonesia is divided into twelve regencies (kabupaten) and one city (kota), which together are subdivided in turn administratively into 175 districts (kecamatan).

The districts of Central Sulawesi, with the regency or city each falls into, are as follows:

- Ampana Kota, Tojo Una-Una
- Ampana Tete, Tojo Una-Una
- Ampibabo, Parigi Moutong
- Bahodopi, Morowali
- Balaesang, Donggala
- Balaesang Tanjung, Donggala
- Balantak, Banggai
- Balantak Selatan, Banggai
- Balantak Utara, Banggai
- Balinggi, Parigi Moutong
- Banawa, Donggala
- Banawa Selatan, Donggala
- Banawa Tengah, Donggala
- Banggai, Banggai Kepulauan
- Baolan, Toli-Toli
- Basidondo, Toli-Toli
- Batui, Banggai
- Batui Selatan, Banggai
- Batudaka, Tojo Una-Una
- Biau, Buol
- Boalemo, Banggai
- Bokan Kepulauan, Banggai Kepulauan
- Bokat, Buol
- Bolano, Parigi Moutong
- Bolano Lambunu, Parigi Moutong
- Bualemo, Banggai
- Bukal, Buol
- Buko, Banggai Kepulauan
- Bulagi Selatan, Banggai Kepulauan
- Bulagi, Banggai Kepulauan
- Bumi Raya, Morowali
- Bungku Barat, Morowali
- Bungku Selatan, Morowali
- Bungku Tengah, Morowali
- Bungku Utara, Morowali
- Bunobogu, Buol
- Bunta, Banggai
- Dampal Selatan, Toli-Toli
- Dampal Utara, Toli-Toli
- Damsol, Donggala
- Dolo Barat, Sigi
- Dolo Selatan, Sigi
- Dolo, Sigi
- Dondo, Toli-Toli
- Gadung, Buol
- Galang, Toli-Toli
- Gumbasa, Sigi
- Kasimbar, Parigi Moutong
- Kinovaro, Sigi
- Kintom, Banggai
- Kulawi Selatan, Sigi
- Kulawi, Sigi
- Labuan, Donggala
- Lage, Poso
- Lamala, Banggai
- Lampasio, Toli-Toli
- Lembo, Morowali
- Liang, Banggai Kepulauan
- Lindu, Sigi
- Lipunoto, Buol
- Lo Bangkurung, Banggai Kepulauan
- Lobu, Banggai
- Lore Selatan, Poso
- Lore Tengah, Poso
- Lore Utara, Poso
- Lore Timur, Poso
- Lore Peore, Poso
- Luwuk, Banggai
- Luwuk Selatan, Banggai
- Luwuk Timur, Banggai
- Mamosalato, Morowali
- Mantoh, Banggai
- Marawola Barat, Sigi
- Marawola, Sigi
- Masama, Banggai
- Menui Kepulauan, Morowali
- Mepanga, Parigi Moutong
- Momunu, Buol
- Moiling, Banggai
- Mori Atas, Morowali
- Moutong, Parigi Moutong
- Nambo, Banggai
- Nokilalaki, Sigi
- Nuhon, Banggai
- Ogo Deide, Toli-Toli
- Ongka Malino, Parigi Moutong
- Pagimana, Banggai
- Paleleh, Buol
- Palasa, Parigi Moutong
- Palolo, Sigi
- Palu Barat, Palu
- Palu Selatan, Palu
- Palu Timur, Palu
- Palu Utara, Palu
- Pamona Selatan, Poso
- Pamona Timur, Poso
- Pamona Utara, Poso
- Parigi, Parigi Moutong
- Parigi Barat, Parigi Moutong
- Parigi Selatan, Parigi Moutong
- Parigi Tengah, Parigi Moutong
- Parigi Utara, Parigi Moutong
- Petasia, Morowali
- Pipikoro, Sigi
- Pinembani, Donggala
- Poso Kota, Poso
- Poso Kota Utara, Poso
- Poso Kota Selatan, Poso
- Poso Pesisir, Poso
- Poso Pesisir Selatan, Poso
- Poso Pesisir Utara, Poso
- Ratulindo, Tojo Una-Una
- Riopakawa, Donggala
- Sausu, Parigi Moutong
- Sidoan, Parigi Moutong
- Sigi Biromaru, Sigi
- Sindue, Donggala
- Sindue Tombusabora, Donggala
- Sindue Tobata, Donggala
- Sirenja, Donggala
- Siniu, Parigi Moutong
- Sojol, Donggala
- North Sojol, Donggala
- Soyo Jaya, Morowali
- Talatako, Tojo Una-Una
- Tanambulawa, Sigi
- Tanantovea, Donggala
- Taopa, Parigi Moutong
- Tawaeli, Donggala
- Tinangkung, Banggai Kepulauan
- Tinombo Selatan, Parigi Moutong
- Tinombo, Parigi Moutong
- Tiolan, Buol
- Togean, Tojo Una-Una
- Toili, Banggai
- Toili Barat, Banggai
- Tojo Barat, Tojo Una-Una
- Tojo, Tojo Una-Una
- Tomini, Parigi Moutong
- Toribulu, Parigi Moutong
- Torue, Parigi Moutong
- Totikum, Banggai Kepulauan
- Ulu Bongka, Tojo Una-Una
- Una-Una, Tojo Una-Una
- Utara Toli-Toli, Toli-Toli
- Walea Besar, Tojo Una-Una
- Walea Kepulauan, Tojo Una-Una
- Wita Ponda, Morowali
