= Banawa =

Banawa may refer to:

- Banawá people, an ethnic group of Brazil
- Banawa language, or Madi, a language of Brazil
- Banawa, Indonesia, a town in Indonesia
  - Banawa Tengah, a district
  - Banawa Selatan, Donggala, a district
- Carol Banawa (born 1981), US-based Filipino singer and actress

== See also ==
- Badnawar, town in Madhya Pradesh, India
- Bakunawa, a dragon in Philippine mythology
- Bana Wala, village in Punjab, India
- Banaswadi, neighbourhood of Bangalore, India
- Banawadi, village in Maharashtra, India
- Banawali, village and archaeological site in Haryana, India
