= Sibualong =

- Location in Central Sulawesi and Indonesia Sibualong (Indonesia)
- Coordinates: 0°0′49.374″S 119°55′57.1836″E
- Country: Indonesia
- Province: Central Sulawesi
- Regency: Donggala Regency
- District: Balaesang District
- Elevation: 846 ft (258 m)

Population (2010)
  - Total: 2,437
- Time zone: UTC+8 (Indonesia Central Standard Time)

Sibualong is a village in Balaesang district, Donggala Regency in North Sulawesi province, Indonesia. Its population is 2437. Located about 1520 metres from the equator, it is the closest village in Sulawesi to the equator.

== Climate ==
Sibualong has a tropical rainforest climate (Af) with moderate to heavy rainfall year-round. With only 1410 mm of annual rainfall, it is one of the driest places with this climate type.

Climate data for Sibualong
Month	Jan	Feb	Mar	Apr	May	Jun	Jul	Aug	Sep	Oct	Nov	Dec	Year
Mean daily maximum °C (°F)	29.2 (84.6)	29.3 (84.7)	29.6 (85.3)	29.6 (85.3)	29.8 (85.6)	29.0 (84.2)	28.2 (82.8)	29.4 (84.9)	29.7 (85.5)	30.7 (87.3)	30.1 (86.2)	29.7 (85.5)	29.5 (85.2)
Daily mean °C (°F)	25.3 (77.5)	25.4 (77.7)	25.7 (78.3)	25.6 (78.1)	26.1 (79.0)	25.4 (77.7)	24.5 (76.1)	25.5 (77.9)	25.5 (77.9)	26.2 (79.2)	25.9 (78.6)	25.8 (78.4)	25.6 (78.0)
Mean daily minimum °C (°F)	21.5 (70.7)	21.6 (70.9)	21.8 (71.2)	21.7 (71.1)	22.4 (72.3)	21.8 (71.2)	20.9 (69.6)	21.6 (70.9)	21.3 (70.3)	21.8 (71.2)	21.7 (71.1)	21.9 (71.4)	21.7 (71.0)
Average precipitation mm (inches)	180 (7.1)	145 (5.7)	129 (5.1)	123 (4.8)	118 (4.6)	116 (4.6)	91 (3.6)	74 (2.9)	64 (2.5)	75 (3.0)	112 (4.4)	183 (7.2)	1,410 (55.5)
Source: Climate-Data.org
