= 2025–26 Liga 4 Central Sulawesi =

Tournament details
- Country: Indonesia
- Venue: Faqih Rasyid Field
- Dates: 10–21 April 2026
- Teams: 11

Final positions
- Champions: Celebest
- Runners-up: Persigi Sigi

Tournament statistics
- Matches played: 19
- Goals scored: 41 (2.16 per match)

The 2025–26 Liga 4 Central Sulawesi is the inaugural season of Liga 4 Central Sulawesi after the change in the structure of Indonesian football competition and serves as a qualifying round for the national phase of the 2025–26 Liga 4. The competition is organised by the Central Sulawesi Provincial PSSI Association (Asprov PSSI Sulteng).

== Background ==
The 2025–26 Liga 4 Central Sulawesi is the first season of the newly formed fourth-tier football league in Indonesia, replacing the previous regional Liga 3. Following a virtual meeting held via Zoom between the Asprov PSSI Central Sulawesi and club representatives, it was initially confirmed that 10 teams would participate, although the number later adjusted to 12 teams. The competition serves as the qualifying path for Central Sulawesi clubs to advance to the national phase of the Liga 4.

== Teams ==
=== Participating teams ===
Initially, 12 teams participated in the competition, but Binatama United finally decided to withdraw before the competition started for certain reasons, so the number of participating teams was reduced to 11.

| No | Team | Location | 2024–25 season |
|---|---|---|---|
| 1 | Persigi Sigi | Sigi Regency | — |
| 2 | PS Kaleke Putra (Note: 2025–26 Liga 4 Sigi winner.) | Sigi Regency | — |
| 3 | Celebest | Palu City | Champion |
| 4 | Galara Utama | Palu City | Group stage |
| 5 | Garda Justitia | Palu City | — |
| 6 | AKL 88 (Note: 2025–26 Liga 4 Palu winner.) | Palu City | — |
| 7 | Persido Donggala | Donggala Regency | Runner-up |
| 8 | Sinar Laut (Note: 2025–26 Liga 4 Donggala winner.) | Donggala Regency | — |
| 9 | Persema Mepanga | Parigi Moutong Regency | Semi-finalist |
| 10 | PS Berlian Tomoli (Note: 2025–26 Liga 4 Parigi Moutong runner-up.) | Parigi Moutong Regency | — |
| 11 | Persibal Luwuk | Banggai Regency | Group stage |
Withdrawing from the competition
| – | Binatama United | Palu City | — |

== Venue ==
This competition was held in Palu as the provincial capital.

| Venue | Location | Capacity |
|---|---|---|
| Faqih Rasyid Field | Palu | — |

== Format ==
The competition follows a structured format as decided during the technical coordination meetings:

- Group stage: The 11 teams are divided into four groups (Group A to D), with each group consisting of 3 teams. They play in a single round-robin format.
- Knockout stage: The top two teams from each group advance to the Round of 8 (quarter-finals). The knockout phase is played as single-leg matches, proceeding to extra time and penalty shoot-outs if the score remains tied after regulation time.

== Schedule ==
The official schedule for the tournament was finalized following the drawing ceremony. The competition is slated to begin on 10 April 2026.

- Group drawing: 7 March 2026
- Official kick-off: 10 April 2026
- Group stage: 10–15 April 2026
- Knockout stage: 16–21 April 2026

== Group stage ==
=== Group A ===
| Pos | Team | Pld | W | D | L | GF | GA | GD | Pts | Qualification |
|---|---|---|---|---|---|---|---|---|---|---|
| 1 | Persigi Sigi | 2 | 1 | 1 | 0 | 5 | 0 | +5 | 4 | Qualification to knockout stage |
| 2 | AKL 88 | 2 | 1 | 1 | 0 | 1 | 0 | +1 | 4 | Qualification to knockout stage |
| 3 | Persido Donggala | 2 | 0 | 0 | 2 | 0 | 6 | −6 | 0 | |

Source: PSSI Central Sulawesi

Matches (10–14 April 2026)

==== Match 1 ====
10 April 2026
16:00 (UTC+8)

| Persigi Sigi | 0–0 | AKL 88 |
|---|---|---|
| | Report |

Faqih Rasyid Field, Palu

==== Match 2 ====
12 April 2026
16:00 (UTC+8)

| Persido Donggala | 0–5 | Persigi Sigi |
|---|---|---|
| | Report |

Faqih Rasyid Field, Palu

==== Match 3 ====
14 April 2026
14:00 (UTC+8)

| AKL 88 | 1–0 | Persido Donggala |
|---|---|---|
| | Report |

Faqih Rasyid Field, Palu

=== Group B ===
| Pos | Team | Pld | W | D | L | GF | GA | GD | Pts | Qualification |
|---|---|---|---|---|---|---|---|---|---|---|
| 1 | Persibal Luwuk | 2 | 2 | 0 | 0 | 4 | 1 | +3 | 6 | Qualification to knockout stage |
| 2 | Garda Justitia | 2 | 0 | 1 | 1 | 2 | 3 | −1 | 1 | Qualification to knockout stage |
| 3 | Sinar Laut | 2 | 0 | 1 | 1 | 1 | 3 | −2 | 1 | |

Source: PSSI Central Sulawesi

Matches (11–14 April 2026)

==== Match 1 ====
11 April 2026
14:00 (UTC+8)

| Persibal Luwuk | 2–0 | Sinar Laur |
|---|---|---|
| | Report |

Faqih Rasyid Field, Palu

==== Match 2 ====
13 April 2026
14:00 (UTC+8)

| Garda Justitia | 1–2 | Persibal Luwuk |
|---|---|---|
| | Report |

Faqih Rasyid Field, Palu

==== Match 3 ====
14 April 2026
16:00 (UTC+8)

| Sinar Laut | 1–1 | Garda Justitia |
|---|---|---|
| | Report |

Faqih Rasyid Field, Palu

=== Group C ===
| Pos | Team | Pld | W | D | L | GF | GA | GD | Pts | Qualification |
|---|---|---|---|---|---|---|---|---|---|---|
| 1 | PS Kaleke Putra | 2 | 2 | 0 | 0 | 3 | 0 | +3 | 6 | Qualification to knockout stage |
| 2 | Persema Mepanga | 2 | 1 | 0 | 1 | 4 | 1 | +3 | 3 | Qualification to knockout stage |
| 3 | Galara Utama | 2 | 0 | 0 | 2 | 0 | 6 | −6 | 0 | |

Source: PSSI Central Sulawesi

Matches (11–15 April 2026)

==== Match 1 ====
11 April 2026
16:00 (UTC+8)

| Galara Utama | 0–2 | PS Kaleke Putra |
|---|---|---|
| | Report |

Faqih Rasyid Field, Palu

==== Match 2 ====
13 April 2026
16:00 (UTC+8)

| Persema Mepanga | 4–0 | Galara Utama |
|---|---|---|
| | Report |

Faqih Rasyid Field, Palu

==== Match 3 ====
15 April 2026
16:00 (UTC+8)

| PS Kaleke Putra | 1–0 | Persema Mepanga |
|---|---|---|
| | Report |

Faqih Rasyid Field, Palu

=== Group D ===
| Pos | Team | Pld | W | D | L | GF | GA | GD | Pts | Qualification |
|---|---|---|---|---|---|---|---|---|---|---|
| 1 | Celebest | 2 | 1 | 0 | 1 | 3 | 1 | +2 | 3 | Qualification to knockout stage |
| 2 | PS Berlian Tomoli | 2 | 1 | 0 | 1 | 1 | 3 | −2 | 3 | Qualification to knockout stage |
| 3 | Binatama United | 0 | 0 | 0 | 0 | 0 | 0 | 0 | 0 | Withdraw |

Source: PSSI Central Sulawesi

Matches (12–15 April 2026)

==== Match 1 ====
12 April 2026
14:00 (UTC+8)

| Celebest | 3–0 | PS Berlian Tomoli |
|---|---|---|
| | Report |

Faqih Rasyid Field, Palu

==== Match 2 ====
15 April 2026
14:00 (UTC+8)

| PS Berlian Tomoli | 1–0 | Celebest |
|---|---|---|
| | Report |

Faqih Rasyid Field, Palu

==== Cancelled matches ====
April 2026
--:-- (UTC+8)

| Binatama United | (cancelled) | Celebest |
|---|---|---|
| | Report |

Faqih Rasyid Field, Palu
April 2026
--:-- (UTC+8)

| PS Berlian Tomoli | (cancelled) | Binatama United |
|---|---|---|
| | Report |

Faqih Rasyid Field, Palu

== Knockout stage ==
The winners and runners-up from each group advance to the quarter-finals.

=== Bracket ===
Quarter-finals
16 April 2026 — Faqih Rasyid Field, Palu
A1 | Persigi Sigi | 1
B2 | Garda Justitia | 0
17 April 2026 — Faqih Rasyid Field, Palu
C1 | PS Kaleke Putra | 1
D2 | PS Berlian Tomoli | 2
16 April 2026 — Faqih Rasyid Field, Palu
B1 | Persibal Luwuk | 1
A2 | AKL 88 | 2
17 April 2026 — Faqih Rasyid Field, Palu
D1 | Celebest | 3
C2 | Persema Mepanga | 1

Semi-finals
18 April 2026 — Faqih Rasyid Field, Palu
Persigi Sigi | 3
PS Berlian Tomoli | 0
19 April 2026 — Faqih Rasyid Field, Palu
AKL 88 | 0 (4)
Celebest | 0 (5)

Final
21 April 2026 — Faqih Rasyid Field, Palu
Persigi Sigi | 0
Celebest | 1
Third-place play-off
20 April 2026 — Faqih Rasyid Field, Palu
PS Berlian Tomoli | 2
AKL 88 | 0

=== Quarter-finals ===
The quarter-finals will be held on 16–17 April 2026 at the Faqih Rasyid Field, Palu.

Quarter-finals (16–17 April 2026)

==== Quarter-final 1 ====
16 April 2026
07:00 (UTC+8)

| Persigi Sigi | 1–0 | Garda Justitia |
|---|---|---|
| | Report |

Faqih Rasyid Field, Palu

==== Quarter-final 2 ====
16 April 2026
15:00 (UTC+8)

| Persibal Luwuk | 1–2 | AKL 88 |
|---|---|---|
| | Report |

Faqih Rasyid Field, Palu

==== Quarter-final 3 ====
17 April 2026
07:00 (UTC+8)

| PS Kaleke Putra | 1–2 | PS Berlian Tomoli |
|---|---|---|
| | Report |

Faqih Rasyid Field, Palu

==== Quarter-final 4 ====
17 April 2026
15:00 (UTC+8)

| Celebest | 3–1 | Persema Mepanga |
|---|---|---|
| | Report |

Faqih Rasyid Field, Palu

=== Semi-finals ===
The semi-finals will be held on 18–19 April 2026 at the Faqih Rasyid Field, Palu.

Semi-finals (18–19 April 2026)

==== Semi-final 1 ====
18 April 2026
15:00 (UTC+8)

| Persigi Sigi | 3–0 | PS Berlian Tomoli |
|---|---|---|
| | Report |

Faqih Rasyid Field, Palu

==== Semi-final 2 ====
19 April 2026
15:00 (UTC+8)

| AKL 88 | 0–0 | Celebest |
|---|---|---|
| | Report |
Penalties
| | 4–5 |

Faqih Rasyid Field, Palu

=== Third-place play-off ===
The third-place play-off will be held on 20 April 2026 at the Faqih Rasyid Field, Palu.

3rd place (20 April 2026)
20 April 2026
15:00 (UTC+8)

| PS Berlian Tomoli | 2–0 | AKL 88 |
|---|---|---|
| | Report |

Faqih Rasyid Field, Palu

=== Final ===
The final will be held on 21 April 2026 at the Faqih Rasyid Field, Palu.

Final (21 April 2026)
April 2026
15:00 (UTC+8)

| Persigi Sigi | 0–1 | Celebest |
|---|---|---|
| | Report |

Faqih Rasyid Field, Palu

== See also ==
- 2025–26 Liga 4
