= 2024–25 Liga 4 Central Sulawesi =

Liga 4 Central Sulawesi
- Season: 2024–25
- Dates: 20–27 February 2025
- Champions: Celebest (1st title)
- National phase: Celebest
- Matches: 15
- Goals: 50 (3.33 per match)
- Biggest win: Galara Utama 1–8 Persido Donggala (22 February 2025)
- Highest scoring: Galara Utama 1–8 Persido Donggala (22 February 2025)

The 2024–25 Liga 4 Central Sulawesi will be the inaugural season of Liga 4 Central Sulawesi after the structural changes of Indonesian football competition and serves as a qualifying round for the national phase of the 2024–25 Liga 4. The competition will be organised by the Central Sulawesi Provincial PSSI Association.

== Teams ==
=== Participating teams ===
A total of 8 teams are competing in this season.

| No | Team | Location | 2023–24 season |
|---|---|---|---|
| 1 | Bandar Sulteng | Donggala Regency | Champions |
| 2 | Persido Donggala | Donggala Regency | — |
| 3 | PS Tisswan | Donggala Regency | — |
| 4 | Persema Mepanga | Parigi Moutong Regency | — |
| 5 | Celebest | Palu City | First round (4th in Group A) |
| 6 | Galara Utama | Palu City | — |
| 7 | PS Bintang Timur Taipa | Palu City | Runner-up |
| 8 | Persibal | Banggai Regency | — |

== Schedule ==
The schedule of the competition is as follows.

| Stage | Matchday | Date |
|---|---|---|
| Group stage | Matchday 1 | 20–21 February 2025 |
| Group stage | Matchday 2 | 22–23 February 2025 |
| Group stage | Matchday 3 | 24–25 February 2025 |
| Knockout stage | Semi-finals | 26 February 2025 |
| Knockout stage | Final | 27 February 2025 |

== Group stage ==
A total of 8 teams will be drawn into two groups of four. The group stage will be played in a home tournament format of single round-robin matches.

The top two teams of each group will qualify for the knockout stage.

=== Group A ===
All matches will be held at Persido Stadium, Donggala.

| Pos | Team | Pld | W | D | L | GF | GA | GD | Pts | Qualification | CEL | PDO | BAL | GLU |
|---|---|---|---|---|---|---|---|---|---|---|---|---|---|---|
| 1 | Celebest | 3 | 3 | 0 | 0 | 5 | 1 | +4 | 9 | Qualification to the Knockout stage | — | — | — | 2–1 |
| 2 | Persido Donggala (H) | 3 | 2 | 0 | 1 | 9 | 3 | +6 | 6 | Qualification to the Knockout stage | 0–2 | — | 1–0 | — |
| 3 | Persibal | 3 | 1 | 0 | 2 | 5 | 2 | +3 | 3 | | 0–1 | — | — | — |
| 4 | Galara Utama | 3 | 0 | 0 | 3 | 2 | 15 | −13 | 0 | | — | 1–8 | 0–5 | — |

Source: Liga 4 Central Sulawesi
Rules for classification: 1) Points; 2) Head-to-head points; 3) Head-to-head goal difference; 4) Head-to-head goals scored; 5) Goal difference; 6) Goals scored; 7) Fair-play points; 8) Draw.
(H) Hosts

Group A Matches

Matchday 1 (20 February)
20 February 2025
13:30 UTC+8

| Persido Donggala | 0–2 | Celebest |
|---|---|---|
| | Report |

Persido Stadium, Donggala
20 February 2025
15:30 UTC+8

| Galara Utama | 0–5 | Persibal |
|---|---|---|
| | Report |

Persido Stadium, Donggala

Matchday 2 (22 February)
22 February 2025
13:30 UTC+8

| Galara Utama | 1–8 | Persido Donggala |
|---|---|---|
| | Report |

Persido Stadium, Donggala
22 February 2025
15:30 UTC+8

| Persibal | 0–1 | Celebest |
|---|---|---|
| | Report |

Persido Stadium, Donggala

Matchday 3 (24 February)
24 February 2025
13:30 UTC+8

| Celebest | 2–1 | Galara Utama |
|---|---|---|
| | Report |

Persido Stadium, Donggala
24 February 2025
15:30 UTC+8

| Persido Donggala | 1–0 | Persibal |
|---|---|---|
| | Report |

Persido Stadium, Donggala

=== Group B ===
All matches will be held at Persido Stadium, Donggala.

| Pos | Team | Pld | W | D | L | GF | GA | GD | Pts | Qualification | PMA | BTT | TWN | BSU |
|---|---|---|---|---|---|---|---|---|---|---|---|---|---|---|
| 1 | Persema Mepanga | 3 | 1 | 2 | 0 | 9 | 4 | +5 | 5 | Qualification to the Knockout stage | — | 1–1 | — | 2–2 |
| 2 | PS Bintang Timur Taipa | 3 | 1 | 2 | 0 | 4 | 2 | +2 | 5 | Qualification to the Knockout stage | — | — | 1–1 | 2–0 |
| 3 | PS Tisswan | 3 | 1 | 1 | 1 | 6 | 8 | −2 | 4 | | 1–6 | — | — | — |
| 4 | Bandar Sulteng | 3 | 0 | 1 | 2 | 3 | 8 | −5 | 1 | | — | — | 1–4 | — |

Source: Liga 4 Central Sulawesi
Rules for classification: 1) Points; 2) Head-to-head points; 3) Head-to-head goal difference; 4) Head-to-head goals scored; 5) Goal difference; 6) Goals scored; 7) Fair-play points; 8) Draw.

Group B Matches

Matchday 1 (21 February)
21 February 2025
13:30 UTC+8

| PS Bintang Timur Taipa | 1–1 | PS Tisswan |
|---|---|---|
| | Report |

Persido Stadium, Donggala
21 February 2025
15:30 UTC+8

| Persema Mepanga | 2–2 | Bandar Sulteng |
|---|---|---|
| | Report |

Persido Stadium, Donggala

Matchday 2 (23 February)
23 February 2025
13:30 UTC+8

| Persema Mepanga | 1–1 | PS Bintang Timur Taipa |
|---|---|---|
| | Report |

Persido Stadium, Donggala
23 February 2025
15:30 UTC+8

| Bandar Sulteng | 1–4 | PS Tisswan |
|---|---|---|
| | Report |

Persido Stadium, Donggala

Matchday 3 (25 February)
25 February 2025
13:30 UTC+8

| PS Tisswan | 1–6 | Persema Mepanga |
|---|---|---|
| | Report |

Persido Stadium, Donggala
25 February 2025
15:30 UTC+8

| PS Bintang Timur Taipa | 2–0 | Bandar Sulteng |
|---|---|---|
| | Report |

Persido Stadium, Donggala

== Knockout stage ==
The knockout stage will be played as a single match. If tied after regulation time, extra time and, if necessary, a penalty shoot-out will be used to decide the winning team.

=== Bracket ===
Semi-finals
26 February 2025 — Donggala
A1 | Celebest | 2
B2 | PS Bintang Timur Taipa | 0
26 February 2025 — Donggala
B1 | Persema Mepanga | 0
A2 | Persido Donggala | 3

Final
27 February 2025 — Donggala
Celebest (p) | 1 (8)
Persido Donggala | 1 (7)

=== Semi-finals ===
26 February 2025
13:30 UTC+8

| Celebest | 2–0 | PS Bintang Timur Taipa |
|---|---|---|
| | Report |

Persido Stadium, Donggala

26 February 2025
15:30 UTC+8

| Persema Mepanga | 0–3 | Persido Donggala |
|---|---|---|
| | Report |

Persido Stadium, Donggala

=== Final ===
27 February 2025
15:30 UTC+8

| Celebest | 1–1 | Persido Donggala |
|---|---|---|
| | Report |
Penalties
| | 8–7 |

Persido Stadium, Donggala

== See also ==
- 2024–25 Liga 4
