= Bandar Sulteng F.C. =

Association football team in Indonesia

Bandar Sulteng
- Full name: Bandar Sulawesi Tengah Football Club
- Nickname: Hiu Paus Donggala
- Short name: BSFC
- Founded: 2010; 16 years ago
- Ground: Gawalise Stadium
- Capacity: 20,000
- Owner: Askab PSSI Donggala
- Chairman: Burhanuddin Yado
- Coach: Abdul Gafur
- League: Liga 4
- 2024–25: 4th, in Group B (Central Sulawesi zone)
Home colours	Away colours

Bandar Sulawesi Tengah Football Club (simply known as Bandar Sulteng) is an Indonesian football club based in Donggala, Central Sulawesi. They currently compete in the Liga 4.

== Honours ==
- Liga 3 Central Sulawesi
  - Champions (1): 2023–24
  - Runners-up (1): 2021
