= Rarowatu, Bombana =

Rarowatu is a kecamatan or district in Bombana Regency, Southeast Sulawesi, Indonesia. Localities in Rarowatu include Eeea.

== See also ==
- List of districts of Southeast Sulawesi
