= List of districts of Jambi =

The province of Jambi in Indonesia is divided into regencies which in turn are divided administratively into districts or kecamatan.

The districts of Jambi, with the regency each falls into, are as follows:

- Air Hangat Timur, Kerinci
- Air Hangat, Kerinci
- Bajubang, Batang Hari
- Bangko, Merangin
- Batang Asai, Sarolangun
- Batang Merangin, Kerinci
- Bathin II Babeko, Bungo
- Batin XXIV, Batang Hari
- Betara, Tanjung Jabung Barat
- Danau Kerinci, Kerinci
- Dendang, Tanjung Jabung Timur
- Depati Tujuh, Kerinci
- Gunung Kerinci, Kerinci
- Gunung Raya, Kerinci
- Hamparan Rawang, Kerinci
- Jambi Luar Kota, Muaro Jambi
- Jambi Selatan, Jambi
- Jambi Timur, Jambi
- Jangkat, Merangin
- Jelutung, Jambi
- Jujuhan, Bungo
- Kayu Aro, Kerinci
- Keliling Danau, Kerinci
- Kumpeh Ulu, Muaro Jambi
- Kumpeh, Muaro Jambi
- Kumun Debai, Kerinci
- Limbur Lubuk Mengkuang, Bungo
- Limun, Sarolangun
- Mandiangin, Sarolangun
- Maro Sebo Ilir, Batang Hari
- Maro Sebo Ulu, Batang Hari
- Maro Sebo, Muaro Jambi
- Mendahara, Tanjung Jabung Timur
- Merlung, Tanjung Jabung Barat
- Mersam, Batang Hari
- Mestong, Muaro Jambi
- Muara Bulian, Batang Hari
- Muara Bungo, Bungo
- Muara Sabak, Tanjung Jabung Timur
- Muara Siau, Merangin
- Muara Tabir, Tebo
- Muara Tembesi, Batang Hari
- Muko Muko Batin VII, Bungo
- Nipah Panjang, Tanjung Jabung Timur
- Pamenang, Merangin
- Pasar Jambi, Jambi
- Pauh, Sarolangun
- Pelawan Singkut, Sarolangun
- Pelawan, Sarolangun
- Pelayangan, Jambi
- Pelepat Ilir, Bungo
- Pelepat, Bungo
- Pemayung, Batang Hari
- Pengabuan, Tanjung Jabung Barat
- Pesisir Bukit, Kerinci
- Rantau Pandan, Bungo
- Rantau Rasau, Tanjung Jabung Timur
- Rimbo Bujang, Tebo
- Rimbo Ilir, Tebo
- Rimbo Ulu, Tebo
- Sadu, Tanjung Jabung Timur
- Sarolangun, Sarolangun
- Sekernan, Muaro Jambi
- Serai Serumpun, Tebo
- Singkut, Sarolangun
- Sitinjau Laut, Kerinci
- Siulak, Kerinci
- Sumay, Tebo
- Sungai Bahar, Muaro Jambi
- Sungai Manau, Merangin
- Sungai Penuh, Kerinci
- Tabir Ulu, Merangin
- Tabir, Merangin
- Tamiai, Kerinci
- Tanah Kampung, Kerinci
- Tanah Sepenggal, Bungo
- Tanah Tumbuh, Bungo
- Tebo Ilir, Tebo
- Tebo Tengah, Tebo
- Tebo Ulu, Tebo
- Tengah Ilir, Tebo
- Tungkal Ilir, Tanjung Jabung Barat
- Tungkal Ulu, Tanjung Jabung Barat
- VII Koto Ulu, Tebo
- VII Koto, Tebo
