= List of districts of Central Kalimantan =

The province of Central Kalimantan in Indonesia is divided into regencies which in turn are divided administratively into districts, known as Kecamantan.

The districts of Central Kalimantan, with the regency each falls into, are as follows:

- Antang Kalang, Kotawaringin Timur
- Arut Selatan, Kotawaringin Barat
- Arut Utara, Kotawaringin Barat
- Awang, Barito Timur
- Baamang, Kotawaringin Timur
- Balai Riam, Sukamara
- Banamatingang, Pulang Pisau
- Barito Tuhup Raya, Murung Raya
- Basarang, Kapuas
- Benua Lima, Barito Timur
- Bukit Batu, Palangka Raya
- Bulik, Lamandau
- Cempaga, Kotawaringin Timur
- Danau Sembuluh, Seruyan
- Delang, Lamandau
- Dusun Hilir, Barito Selatan
- Dusun Selatan, Barito Selatan
- Dusun Tengah, Barito Timur
- Dusun Timur, Barito Timur
- Dusun Utara, Barito Selatan
- Gunung Bintang Awai, Barito Selatan
- Gunung Purei, Barito Utara
- Gunung Timang, Barito Utara
- Hanau, Seruyan
- Jekan Raya, Palangka Raya
- Jelai, Sukamara
- Jenamas, Barito Selatan
- Kahayan Hilir, Pulang Pisau
- Kahayan Hulu Utara, Gunung Mas
- Kahayan Kuala, Pulang Pisau
- Kahayan Tengah, Pulang Pisau
- Kamipang, Katingan
- Kapuas Barat, Kapuas
- Kapuas Hilir, Kapuas
- Kapuas Hulu, Kapuas
- Kapuas Kuala, Kapuas
- Kapuas Murung, Kapuas
- Kapuas Timur, Kapuas
- Karau Kuala, Barito Selatan
- Karusen Janang, Barito Timur
- Katingan Hilir, Katingan
- Katingan Hulu, Katingan
- Katingan Kuala, Katingan
- Katingan Tengah, Katingan
- Kota Besi, Kotawaringin Timur
- Kotawaringin Lama, Kotawaringin Barat
- Kumai, Kotawaringin Barat
- Kurun, Gunung Mas
- Lahei, Barito Utara
- Lamandau, Lamandau
- Laung Tuhup, Murung Raya
- Maliku, Pulang Pisau
- Mantangai, Kapuas
- Marikit, Katingan
- Mendawai, Katingan
- Mentawa Baru, Kotawaringin Timur
- Mentaya Hilir Selatan, Kotawaringin Timur
- Mentaya Hilir Utara, Kotawaringin Timur
- Mentaya Hulu, Kotawaringin Timur
- Montalat, Barito Utara
- Munuhing, Gunung Mas
- Murung, Murung Raya
- Pahandut, Palangka Raya
- Paku, Barito Timur
- Pandih Batu, Pulang Pisau
- Pangkalan Banteng, Kotawaringin Barat
- Pangkalan Lada, Kotawaringin Barat
- Parenggean, Kotawaringin Timur
- Patangkep Tutui, Barito Timur
- Pematang Karau, Barito Timur
- Permata Intan, Murung Raya
- Pulau Hanaut, Kotawaringin Timur
- Pulau Malan, Katingan
- Pulau Petak, Kapuas
- Rakumpit, Palangka Raya
- Raren Batuah, Barito Timur
- Rungan, Gunung Mas
- Sanaman Mantikei, Katingan
- Sebangau Kuala, Pulang Pisau
- Sebangau, Palangka Raya
- Selat, Kapuas
- Sepang, Gunung Mas
- Seribu Riam, Murung Raya
- Seruyan Hilir, Seruyan
- Seruyan Hulu, Seruyan
- Seruyan Tengah, Seruyan
- Sukamara, Sukamara
- Sumber Barito, Murung Raya
- Sungai Babuat, Murung Raya
- Tanah Siang, Murung Raya
- Tasik Payawan, Katingan
- Tewah, Gunung Mas
- Tewang Sangalang Garing, Katingan
- Teweh Tengah, Barito Utara
- Teweh Timur, Barito Utara
- Timpah, Kapuas
- U’Ut Murung, Murung Raya
