= Balaesang =

- Location in Sulawesi
- Coordinates: 0.1°S 119.8823°E
- Country: Indonesia
- Province: Central Sulawesi
- Regency: Donggala Regency

Area
  - Total: 314.23 km^{2} (121.32 sq mi)

Population
  - Total: 26,054
- Postal code: 94351

Balaesang is an administrative district (kecamatan) of Donggala Regency, Central Sulawesi, Indonesia. It covers an area of 314.23 km^{2} and had a population of 26,054 in mid 2024. The district capital is Tambu, and the district comprises 13 administrative villages (desa), all sharing the postcode of 94355.

Originally part of this district, the adjoining district of Balaesang Tanjung (Peninsula Balaensang) is now a separate peninsular administration extending off the west coast of Sulawesi.
