= Kaledo (soup) =

Indonesian cow's trotters soup dish

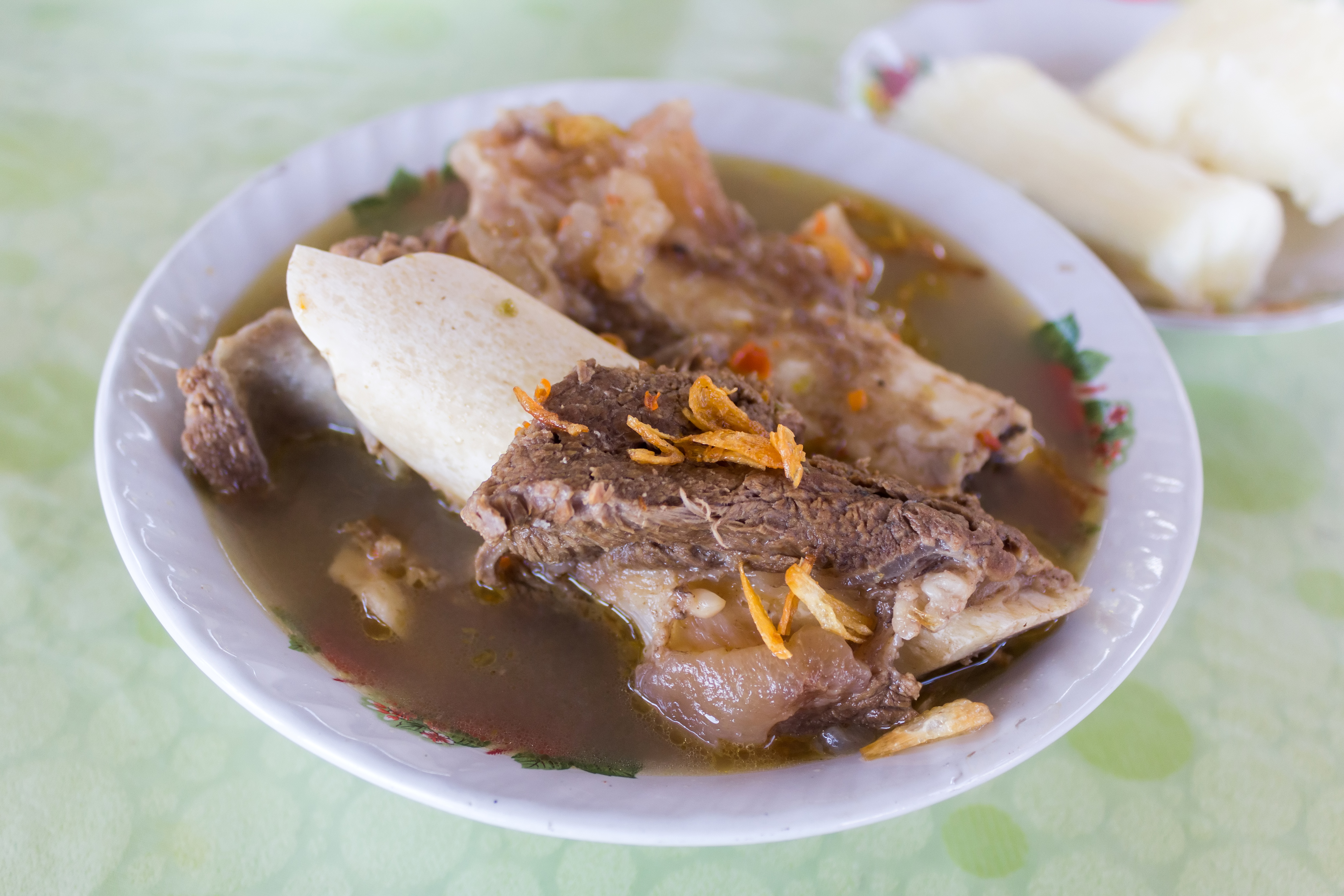
- Alternative names: Sop kaledo, Kaki lembu donggala
- Course: Main course
- Place of origin: Indonesia
- Region or state: Central Sulawesi
- Serving temperature: Hot
- Main ingredients: cow's feet, marrow

Kaledo (or sop kaledo, abbreviated from kaki lembu donggala) is a traditional cow's trotters soup served in spicy broth, from Donggala regency, Central Sulawesi, Indonesia. Per its name, the meat used in this particular food is cow's feet and its marrow. The dish originated from Donggala, and from there spread around Sulawesi.

This soup is often consumed with steamed rice or sweet potatoes, using the usual utensils that consist of spoon, fork, and occasionally knife; and also additionally using straw, used to sip out the marrow inside of the bones. The broth itself was often served with sliced lime, in order to give sour freshness in otherwise quite oily soup.

== See also ==
- List of Indonesian soups
