= Balaesang Tanjung, Donggala =

Balaesang Tanjung
- Location in Sulawesi
- Coordinates: 0.11357740000000001°S 119.7194377°E
- Country: Indonesia
- Province: Central Sulawesi
- Regency: Donggala Regency

Area
  - Total: 188.85 km^{2} (72.92 sq mi)

Population
  - Total: 13,539
- Postal code: 94351

Balaesang Tanjung is an administrative district (kecamatan) of Donggala Regency, Central Sulawesi Province of Indonesia. Originally part of Balaesang District to the east, the adjoining district of Balaesang Tanjung (Peninsula Balaensang) is now a separate peninsular administration off the west coast of Sulawesi. It covers an area of 188.85 km^{2} and had a population of 13,539 in mid 2024. The district capital is Malei, and the district contains 8 administrative villages (desa)..
