= List of districts of Riau =

The province of Riau in Indonesia is divided into regencies which in turn are divided administratively into districts (Indonesian: kecamatan)

The districts of Riau, with the regency each falls into, are as follows:

- Bagan Sinembah, Rokan Hilir
- Bangkinang Barat, Kampar
- Bangkinang Seberang, Kampar
- Bangkinang, Kampar
- Bangko Pusako, Rokan Hilir
- Bangko, Rokan Hilir
- Bangun Purba, Rokan Hulu
- Bantan, Bengkalis
- Batang Cenaku, Indragiri Hulu
- Batang Gansal, Indragiri Hulu
- Batang Tuaka, Sungai Piring (ibu kota/capital city), Indragiri Hilir
- Batu Hampar, Rokan Hilir
- Benai, Kuantan Singingi
- Bengkalis, Bengkalis
- Bukit Batu, Bengkalis
- Bukit Kapur, Dumai
- Bukit Kapur, Siak
- Bukit Raya, Pekanbaru
- Bunga Raya, Siak
- Bunut, Pelalawan
- Cerenti, Kuantan Singingi
- Dayun, Siak
- Dumai Barat, Dumai
- Dumai Barat, Siak
- Dumai Timur, Dumai
- Dumai Timur, Siak
- Enok, Enok (ibu kota/capital city), Indragiri Hilir
- Gaung Anak Serka, Teluk Pinang (ibu kota/capital city), Indragiri Hilir
- Gaung, Kuala Lahang (ibu kota/capital city), Indragiri Hilir
- Gunung Sahilan, Kampar
- Gunung Toar, Kuantan Singingi
- Hulu Kuantan, Kuantan Singingi
- Inuman, Kuantan Singingi
- Kabun, Rokan Hulu
- Kampar Kiri Hilir, Kampar
- Kampar Kiri Hulu, Kampar
- Kampar Kiri, Kampar
- Kampar Timur, Kampar
- Kampar Utara, Kampar
- Kampar, Kampar
- Kandis, Siak
- Kateman, Sungai Guntung (ibu kota/capital city), Indragiri Hilir
- Kelayang, Indragiri Hulu
- Kemuning, Selensen (ibu kota/capital city), Indragiri Hilir
- Kepenuhan, Rokan Hulu
- Kerinci Kanan, Siak
- Keritang, Kotabaru (ibu kota/capital city), Indragiri Hilir
- Kerumutan, Pelalawan
- Koto Gasip, Siak
- Kuala Cenaku, Indragiri Hiir
- Kuala Indragiri, Sapat (ibu kota/capital city), Indragiri Hilir
- Kuala Kampar, Pelalawan
- Kuantan Hilir, Kuantan Singingi
- Kuantan Mudik, Kuantan Singingi
- Kuantan Tengah, Kuantan Singingi
- Kubu, Rokan Hilir
- Kuntodarussalam, Rokan Hulu
- Langgam, Pelalawan
- Lima Puluh, Pekanbaru
- Limapuluh, Pekanbaru
- Lirik, Indragiri Hulu
- Logas Tanah Darat, Kuantan Singingi
- Lubuk Dalam, Siak
- Mandah, Khairiah Mandah (ibu kota/capital city), Indragiri Hilir
- Mandau, Bengkalis
- Marpoyan Damai, Pekanbaru
- Medang Kampai, Dumai
- Medang Kampai, Siak
- Merbau, Bengkalis
- Merbau, Kepulauan Meranti
- Minas, Siak
- Pangean, Kuantan Singingi
- Pangkalan Kerinci, Pelalawan
- Pangkalan Kuras, Pelalawan
- Pangkalan Lesung, Pelalawan
- Pasir Limau Kapas, Rokan Hilir
- Payung Sekaki, Pekanbaru
- Pekanbaru Kota, Pekanbaru
- Pelalawan, Pelalawan
- Pelangiran, Pelangiran (ibu kota/capital city), Indragiri Hilir
- Perhentian Raja, Kampar
- Pinggir, Bengkalis
- Pujud, Rokan Hilir
- Pulau Burung, Pulau Burung (ibu kota/capital city), Indragiri Hilir
- Rambah Hilir, Rokan Hulu
- Rambah Samo, Rokan Hulu
- Rambah, Rokan Hulu
- Rangsang Barat, Bengkalis
- Rangsang Barat, Kepulauan Meranti
- Rangsang, Bengkalis
- Rangsang, Kepulauan Meranti
- Rantau Kopar, Rokan Hilir
- Rengat, Indragiri Hulu
- Reteh, Pulau Kijang (ibu kota/capital city), Indragiri Hilir
- Rimba Melintang, Rokan Hilir
- Rokan IV Koto, Rokan Hulu
- Rumbai Pesisir, Pekanbaru
- Rumbai, Pekanbaru
- Rumbio Jaya, Kampar
- Rupat Utara, Bengkalis
- Rupat, Bengkalis
- Sail, Pekanbaru
- Salo, Kampar
- Seberida, Indragiri Hulu
- Senapelan, Pekanbaru
- Siak Hulu, Kampar
- Siak Kecil, Bengkalis
- Siak, Siak
- Simpang Kanan, Rokan Hilir
- Sinaboi, Rokan Hilir
- Singingi Hilir, Kuantan Singingi
- Singingi, Kuantan Singingi
- Sukajadi, Pekanbaru
- Sungai Apit, Siak
- Sungai Mandau, Siak
- Sungai Sembilan, Dumai
- Sungai Sembilan, Siak
- Tambang, Kampar
- Tampan, Pekanbaru
- Tanah Merah, Kuala Enok (ibu kota/capital city), Indragiri Hilir
- Tanah Putih Tanjung Melawan, Rokan Hilir
- Tanah Putih, Rokan Hilir
- Tandun, Rokan Hulu
- Tapung Hilir, Kampar
- Tapung Hulu, Kampar
- Tapung, Kampar
- Tebing Tinggi Barat, Bengkalis
- Tebing Tinggi Barat, Kepulauan Meranti
- Tebing Tinggi, Bengkalis
- Tebing Tinggi, Kepulauan Meranti
- Teluk Balengkong, Teluk Balengkong (ibu kota/capital city), Indragiri Hilir
- Teluk Meranti, Pelalawan
- Tembilahan Hulu, Tembilahan Hulu (ibu kota/capital city), Indragiri Hilir
- Tembilahan, Tembilahan Kota (ibu kota/capital city), Indragiri Hilir
- Tembusai Utara, Rokan Hulu
- Tembusai, Rokan Hulu
- Tempuling, Sungai Salak (ibu kota/capital city), Indragiri Hilir
- Tualang, Siak
- Ujung Batu, Rokan Hulu
- Ukui, Pelalawan
- XIII Koto Kampar, Kampar
