= Persido Donggala =

Indonesian football club

Persido
- Full name: Persatuan Sepakbola Indonesia Donggala
- Nickname: Nuri Celebes
- Founded: 1957; 69 years ago
- Ground: Persido Donggala Field; Donggala Regency, Central Sulawesi
- Owner: Donggala Government
- Manager: Haerun
- Coach: Yos Nugraha
- League: Liga 4
- 2025–26: 3rd, Group A (Central Sulawesi zone)
Home colours	Away colours

Persatuan Sepakbola Indonesia Donggala (simply known as Persido) is an Indonesian football club based in Donggala Regency, Central Sulawesi. They currently compete at Liga 4 Central Sulawesi zone.

== Honours ==
- Liga Indonesia Second Division Central Sulawesi
  - Champion (1): 2006
- Liga 3 Central Sulawesi
  - Champion (1): 2018
- Liga 4 Central Sulawesi
  - Runner-up (1): 2024–25
