= Tapuya language =

Tapuya (or Tapuyá) is a Tupian term meaning ‘enemy’ or ‘foreigner’ that is used to refer to various unrelated non-Tupian ethnic groups. It can refer to:

- Carapana language, also called Carapana-tapuya, a Tucanoan language
- Baniwa language (Moriwene), also called Sucuriyú-tapuya, an Arawakan language
- Pira-tapuya, an indigenous people of the Amazon regions
- Wanano language, also called Pira-tapuya, a Tucanoan language
- Tarairiú language, an unclassified language of northeastern Brazil

== See also ==
- Baniwa language (disambiguation)
- Maku language
