= List of districts of Southeast Sulawesi =

The province of Southeast Sulawesi (Sulawesi Tenggara) in Indonesia is divided into fifteen regencies (kabupaten) and two cities (kota), which together are subdivided in turn administratively into 219 districts (kecamatan).

The districts of Southeast Sulawesi, with the regency or city each falls into, are as follows:

- Abeli, Kendari
- Abuki, Konawe
- Andoolo, Konawe Selatan
- Angata, Konawe Selatan
- Asera, Konawe
- Barangka, Muna
- Baruga, Kendari
- Batalaiworu, Muna
- Batauga, Buton
- Batu Atas, Buton
- Batu Putih, Kolaka Utara
- Baula, Kolaka
- Betoambari, Bau-Bau
- Binongko, Buton
- Binongko, Wakatobi
- Bondoala Sampara, Konawe
- Bonegunu, Muna
- Bungi, Bau-Bau
- Duruka Bone, Muna
- Gu, Buton
- Kabaena Timur, Bombana
- Kabaena Timur, Buton
- Kabaena, Bombana
- Kabaena, Buton
- Kabangka, Muna
- Kabawo, Muna
- Kadatua, Buton
- Kaledupa, Buton
- Kaledupa, Wakatobi
- Kambowa, Muna
- Kapontori, Buton
- Katobu, Muna
- Kendari Barat, Kendari
- Kendari, Kendari
- Kodeoha, Kolaka Utara
- Kokalukuna, Bau-Bau
- Kolaka, Kolaka
- Kolono, Konawe Selatan
- Konda, Konawe Selatan
- Kontunaga, Muna
- Kulisusu Barat, Muna
- Kulisusu Utara, Muna
- Kulisusu, Muna
- Kusambi, Muna
- Ladongi, Kolaka
- Lainea, Konawe Selatan
- Lakudo, Buton
- Lambadia, Kolaka
- Lambuya, Konawe
- Landono, Konawe Selatan
- Laonti, Konawe Selatan
- Lasalepa, Muna
- Lasalimu Selatan, Buton
- Lasalimu, Buton
- Lasolo, Konawe
- Lasusua, Kolaka Utara
- Latambaga, Kolaka
- Latoma, Konawe
- Lawa, Muna
- Lohia, Muna
- Maginti, Muna
- Maligano, Muna
- Mandonga, Kendari
- Mawasangka Timur, Buton
- Mawasangka, Buton
- Moramo, Konawe Selatan
- Mowewe, Kolaka
- Murhum, Bau-Bau
- Napabalano, Muna
- Ngapa, Kolaka Utara
- Pakue, Kolaka Utara
- Palangga, Konawe Selatan
- Parigi, Muna
- Pasar Wajo, Buton
- Pasir Putih, Muna
- Poasia, Kendari
- Poleang Barat, Bombana
- Poleang Timur, Bombana
- Poleang Timur, Buton
- Poleang, Bombana
- Poleang, Buton
- Pomalaa, Kolaka
- Pondidaha, Konawe
- Ranomeeto, Konawe Selatan
- Ranteangin, Kolaka Utara
- Rarowatu, Bombana
- Rarowatu, Buton
- Rumbia, Bombana
- Rumbia, Buton
- Samaturu, Kolaka
- Sampolawa, Buton
- Sawa, Konawe
- Sawerigadi, Muna
- Siompu, Buton
- Soropia, Konawe
- Sorowalio, Bau-Bau
- Talaga Raya, Buton
- Tanggetada, Kolaka
- Tikep, Muna
- Tinanggea, Konawe Selatan
- Tirawuta, Kolaka
- Tiworo Tengah, Muna
- Tomia, Wakatobi
- Tomia Timur, Wakatobi
- Tongauna, Konawe
- Tongkuno, Muna
- Uepai, Konawe
- Uluiwoi, Kolaka
- Unaaha, Konawe
- Wakorumba Selatan, Muna
- Wakorumba, Muna
- Wangi-Wangi Selatan, Buton
- Wangi-Wangi Selatan, Wakatobi
- Wangi-Wangi, Buton
- Wangi-Wangi, Wakatobi
- Watopute, Muna
- Watubangga, Kolaka
- Wawonii, Konawe
- Waworete, Konawe
- Wawotobi, Konawe
- Wolio, Bau-Bau
- Wolo, Kolaka
- Wonggeduku, Konawe
- Wundulako, Kolaka
