= Kingdom of Moutong =

Historical kingdom in Indonesia

- Early 19th century–1904
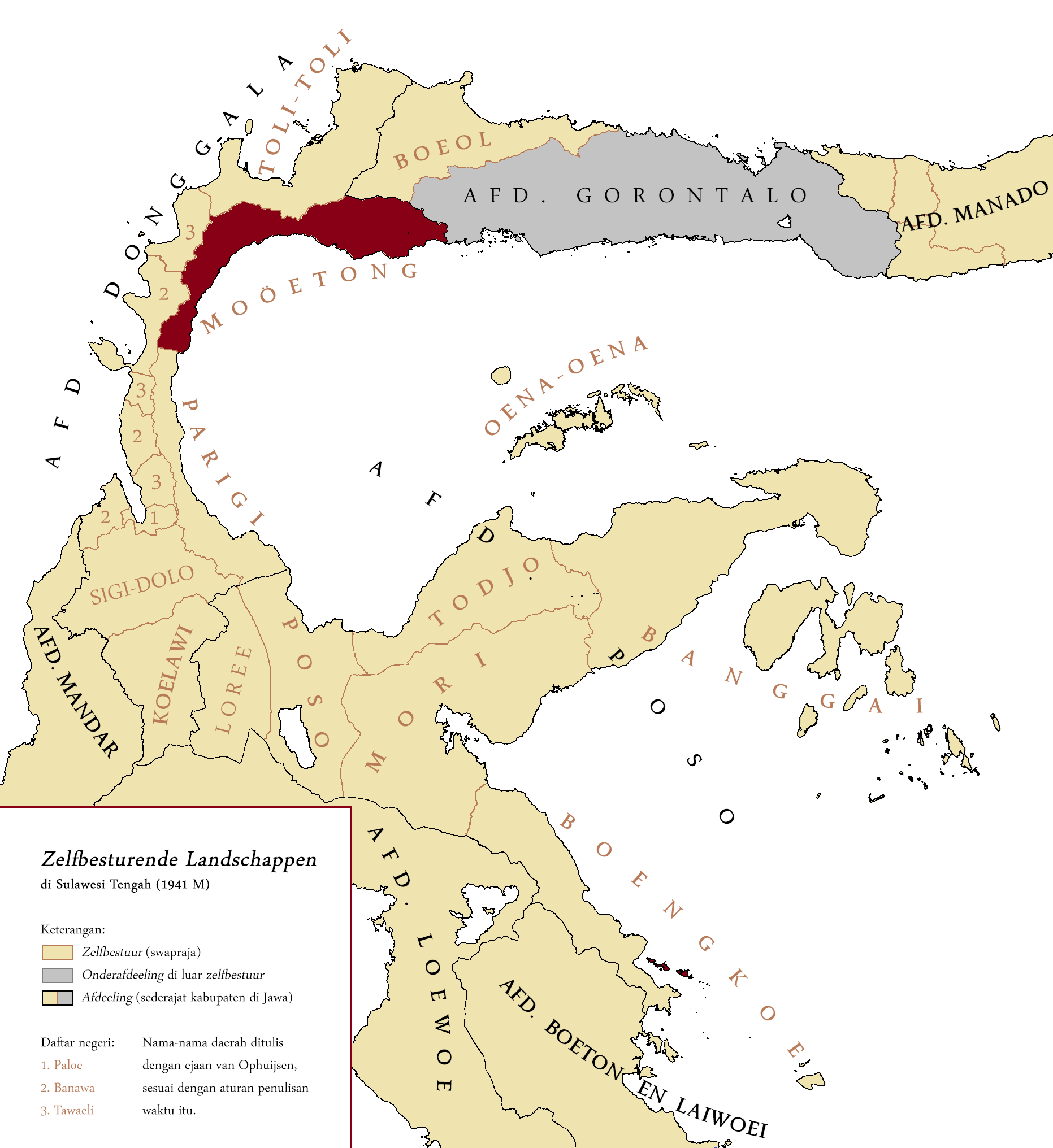
- Moutong (Mooetong; in red)
- Capital: Tinombo
- Government: Monarchy
- History
  - Established: Early 19th century
  - Under Dutch East Indies: 1904
  - Disestablished: 1904
Succeeded by
Dutch East Indies
- Today part of: Indonesia

Kingdom of Moutong was a kingdom established in the early 19th century in the Gulf of Tomini region. Its founder was Magalatung, who was a Mandarese descendant. The population of the Moutong consisted of Bugis and Mandar. Each territory of the Moutong was ruled by officials known as olongian and marsaoleh, as well as subordinates from the Bugis people. The Moutong was eventually conquered by the Dutch in 1904 after a guerrilla resistance led by Tombolotutu and supported by its people and the Kingdom of Lambuno since 1896.

== History ==
=== Establishment ===
The Kingdom of Moutong was established in the early 19th century. According to the genealogy of the Kingdom of Moutong, the first king was Magalatung. He was a Mandarese descendant. He became the king of Moutong after marrying a princess from the ruler of Moutong, Minarang.

=== Downfall ===
==== Resistance toward the Dutch ====
Since the early 19th century, Moutong officials had been involved in manipulating the gold trade with the Dutch. During the reign of Pondatu, the Dutch requested the signing of a cooperation contract, which was consistently rejected by Pondatu. However, the manipulation of the gold trade continued to be carried out by Moutong officials. This situation led Bugis and Mandar migrants to end their trade with the Moutong and redirect trade routes to areas inhabited by the Bugis, Mandar, and Kaili. This shift prompted Tombolotutu, the nephew and designated successor of King Pondatu, to oppose the kingdom’s officials and side with the Bugis and Mandar migrants. In 1877, he began to resist the Dutch.

==== Royal succession ====
In 1892, King Pondatu died. After his death, Tombolotutu succeeded his uncle as King of Moutong. He also appointed an official named Daeng Malino to rule in Tinombo. The Dutch opposed and refused to recognize Tombolotutu's succession due to his close ties with Mandar and Bugis migrants, who resisted Dutch authority in the Tomini Bay area. In 1896, a Dutch representative, E.J. Jellesma, appointed Daeng Malino as King of Moutong. Daeng Malino was an ally of the Dutch. The Dutch eventually succeeded in signing a trade cooperation agreement with the Moutong in 1896.

==== Guerilla resistance and defeat ====
The appointment of Daeng Malino as King of Moutong by the Dutch and the signing of the trade cooperation agreement with the Dutch led to guerrilla resistance in Moutong. In 1896 AD, the people of Moutong began their resistance. The people who supported Tombolotutu as King of Moutong fought against the Dutch forces under the leadership of Tombolotutu. In addition, Tombolotutu received troops' support from Lambuno. The war lasted from 1900 to 1904. At the end of the conflict, the Dutch won the war, seized control over the territories of the Moutong and the Lambuno Kingdoms, and incorporated them into the Dutch East Indies.

== Territory and its people ==
The Kingdom of Moutong had a territory that stretched from the Ampibabo District to Molosipat in the Tomini Bay area. Moutong territory bordered other kingdoms around the Palu Valley, which were the Kingdom of Palu, the Kingdom of Tawaeli, the Kingdom of Biromaru, the Kingdom of Sigi, and the Kingdom of Kulawi. Moutong was inhabited by Bugis migrants and Mandar. The arrival of the Bugis people in Moutong was a result of the Bone War, which began in 1820.

== Governance ==
After Magalatung died, his position as King of Moutong was succeeded by one of his sons named Pondatu. The capital of Moutong was Tinombo. After the Bugis people became migrants in the territory of the Moutong, they were granted authority over certain areas controlled by the kingdom. However, the Bugis did not have a strong influence over the main structure of the Moutong. The highest positions within the kingdom remained in the hands of several olongian and marsaoleh from the Moutong, while the Bugis served as their subordinates. The placement of Bugis people in the government was mainly in Tinombo, Tomini, Palasa, Sigenti, Sigenti, Toribulu, and Ampibabo.
