= Baniwa language =

Baniwa (Baniva) is a name applied to several languages of the Amazon. It may refer to:

- Avane language (Abane)
- Baniwa of Içana (Karu)
- Baniwa of Maroa or Guainía (Warekana)
- Baniwa of Yavita (Yavitero)

== See also ==
- Banawa language
- Tapuya language (disambiguation)
- Maku language
