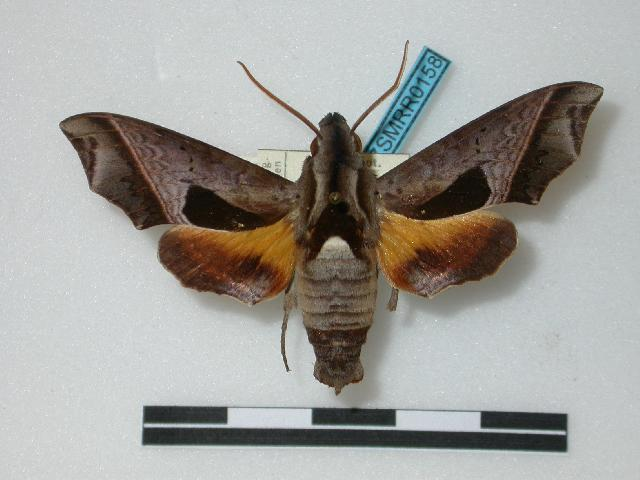

Scientific classification
- Domain: Eukaryota
- Kingdom: Animalia
- Phylum: Arthropoda
- Class: Insecta
- Order: Lepidoptera
- Family: Sphingidae
- Subtribe: Dilophonotina
- Genus: Baniwa; Lichy, 1981
- Species: B. yavitensis

Binomial name
- Baniwa yavitensis Lichy, 1981

= Baniwa yavitensis =

Species of moth

Baniwa is a genus of moths in the family Sphingidae, containing only one species, Baniwa yavitensis, which is known from Venezuela and Amazonas and Pará in Brazil.

There are probably multiple generations per year. Adults have been recorded in July in Brazil.
