= Damsol =

Coordinates: 0.3763°N 119.9783°E

- Coordinates
- Country: Indonesia
- Province: Central Sulawesi
- Regency: Donggala Regency

Area
  - Total: 732.26 km^{2} (282.73 sq mi)

Population
  - Total: 33,396
- Postal code: 94351
- Website: www.Donggala.go.id

Damsol is an administrative district (kecamatan) of Donggala Regency, in Central Sulawesi Province of Indonesia. The district capital is Sabang.
