= Districts of Indonesia =

Third-level administrative subdivision of Indonesia

In Indonesia, district or ambiguously subdistrict, is the third-level administrative subdivision, below regency or city. The local term kecamatan is used in the majority of Indonesian areas. The term distrik is used in provinces in Papua. In the Special Region of Yogyakarta, the term kapanewon is used for districts within the regencies, while the term kemantren is used for districts within Yogyakarta, the province's only city. According to Statistics Indonesia, there are a total of 7,288 districts in Indonesia as of 2023, subdivided into 83,971 administrative villages (rural desa and urban kelurahan).

During the Dutch East Indies and early republic period, the term district referred to kewedanan, a subdivision of regency, while kecamatan was translated as subdistrict (Dutch: onderdistrict). Following the abolition of kewedanan, the term district began to be associated with kecamatan which has since been directly administered by regency. Mainstream media such as The Jakarta Post, Kompas, and Tempo use "district" to refer to kecamatan; however machine translation services like Google Translate often incorrectly uses "district" to refer to regencies instead.

== Definition ==
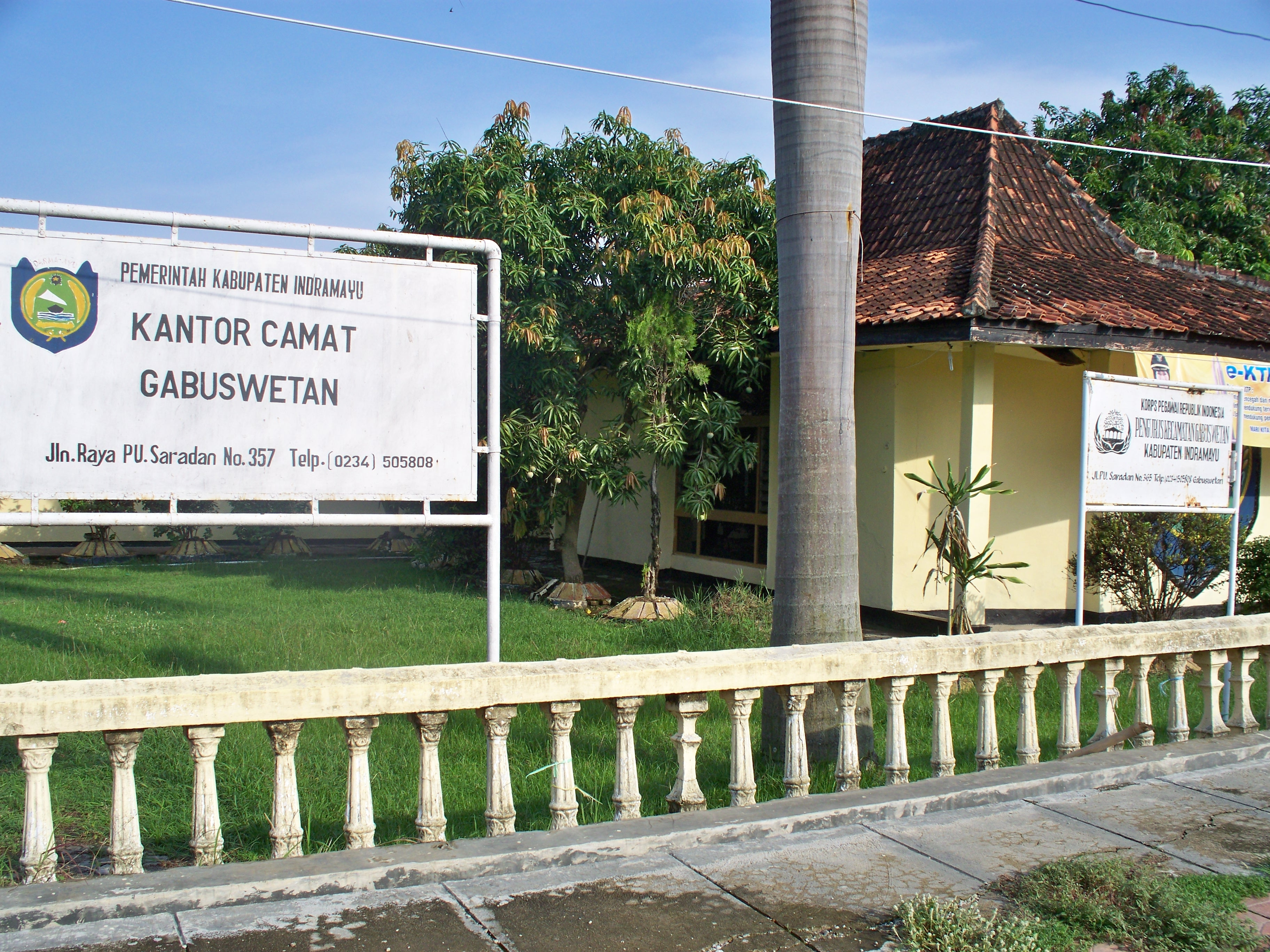
District office of Gabuswetan, Indramayu Regency, West Java

District in Indonesia is the third-level administrative subdivision, below regency or city (second-level) and province (first-level). According to the Act Number 23 of 2014, district is formed by the government of regency or city in order to improve the coordination of governance, public services, and empowerment of urban/rural villages. District head is a career bureaucrat position directly appointed by regent or mayor. The local district term kecamatan is used in the majority of Indonesian areas, with camat being the head.

During the Dutch East Indies and early republic period, the term district referred to kewedanan, a subdivision of a regency. Kewedanan itself was divided into kecamatan, which was translated as subdistrict (Dutch: onderdistrict). Following the abolition of kewedanan, the term district began to be associated with kecamatan which has since been directly administered by regency. In English-language dictionary, subdistrict means "a division or subdivision of a district", hence the translation of kecamatan as subdistrict is no longer precise since the absence of kewedanan as district. The 1982 publication of Statistics Indonesia translated kecamatan as district.

With the release of the Act Number 21 of 2001 on the Special Autonomous of Papua Province, the term distrik was used instead of kecamatan in the entire Western New Guinea. The difference between the two is merely the naming, with kepala distrik being the district head. It was later followed in 2019 by another autonomous province, the Special Region of Yogyakarta, where kecamatan was replaced with kapanewon and kemantren. Sultan Hamengkubuwono X, the region's governor and the monarch of Yogyakarta Sultanate, issued Gubernatorial Decree Number 25 of 2019, which restored the old naming convention for the region's subdivisions. Kapanewon (a subdivision of regency) is headed by a panewu, while kemantren (a subdivision of city), is headed by a mantri pamong praja.

== List of districts ==
Province code	Lists of Districts by provinces	Number of districts as of 2023
11	List of districts of Aceh	290
12	List of districts of North Sumatra	455
13	List of districts of West Sumatra	179
14	List of districts of Riau	172
15	List of districts of Jambi	144
16	List of districts of South Sumatra	241
17	List of districts of Bengkulu	129
18	List of districts of Lampung	229
19	List of districts of the Bangka Belitung Islands	47
21	List of districts of the Riau Islands	80
31	List of districts of Jakarta	44
32	List of districts of West Java	627
33	List of districts of Central Java	576
34	List of districts of the Special Region of Yogyakarta	78
35	List of districts of East Java	666
36	List of districts of Banten	155
51	List of districts of Bali	57
52	List of districts of West Nusa Tenggara	117
53	List of districts of East Nusa Tenggara	315
61	List of districts of West Kalimantan	174
62	List of districts of Central Kalimantan	136
63	List of districts of South Kalimantan	156
64	List of districts of East Kalimantan	105
65	List of districts of North Kalimantan	55
71	List of districts of North Sulawesi	171
72	List of districts of Central Sulawesi	176
73	List of districts of South Sulawesi	311
74	List of districts of Southeast Sulawesi	222
75	List of districts of Gorontalo	77
76	List of districts of West Sulawesi	69
81	List of districts of Maluku	118
82	List of districts of North Maluku	118
91	List of districts of Papua	115
92	List of districts of West Papua	86
93	List of districts of South Papua	83
94	List of districts of Central Papua	131
95	List of districts of Highland Papua	252
96	List of districts of Southwest Papua	132
	Total	7,288
