= Banawa Tengah =

- Location in Sulawesi
- Coordinates: 0.7616102°S 119.7310213°E
- Country: Indonesia
- Province: Central Sulawesi
- Regency: Donggala Regency

Area
  - Total: 74.64 km^{2} (28.82 sq mi)

Population
  - Total: 11,882
- Postal code: 94351

Banawa Tengah (Central Banawa) is an administrative district (kecamatan) of Donggala Regency, in Central Sulawesi Province of Indonesia. The district capital is Limboro.
