= Persipal Palu Junior =

Indonesian football club

Donggala United Junior
- Nicknames: Laskar Gawalise Muda; The Young Hammers
- Founded: 1977; 49 years ago
- Ground: Gawalise Stadium
- Capacity: 20,000
- Owner: Ronny Tanusaputra
- Chairman: Rusdy Mastura
Home colours	Away colours

Donggala United Junior, formerly known as Persipal Junior, is an Indonesian academy football club based in Palu, Central Sulawesi.

== History ==
Persipal had a heyday in the 1970s and was one of the favorite clubs in Indonesia during the Perserikatan era. Several Persipal legend players, including Jack Donald, Jaka Dewa, and Erwin Sumampow, managed to bring Persipal to the 1979 PSSI Perserikatan round of 12 final against Persipura Jayapura.

At that time, in the 1970s, Persipal Palu was coached by Ramang, a world football legend from Makassar, South Sulawesi, they have even played matches with European clubs such as AFC Ajax and Feyenoord from the Netherlands, Votslin from Austria and Asian club Ansan Hallelujah from South Korea.

But over time, their achievements have decreased, since 1995 they are still difficult to get out of the Liga Indonesia First Division zone of the Liga Indonesia. In the 2010–11 season, Persipal Palu could have almost made it to the Divisi Utama if they had not lost to Persbul Buol in the knock-out match towards the last 8 of Divisi Utama at the Gawalise Stadium, Palu.

Prior to 2022–23 Liga 3 where Persipal initially competed, they bought Liga 2 club's license, Muba Babel United. Persipal competed in 2022–23 Liga 2 after the acquisition. For the 2022–23 season, Persipal fielded two teams in two different leagues. The senior team, named Persipal BU (Babel United) competed in the 2022–23 Liga 2, while the original team now served as youth team called Persipal Palu Junior, competing in the 2022–23 Liga 3.

== Honours ==
- Liga Indonesia Second Division
  - Champion (1): 1996–97
- Liga 3 Central Sulawesi
  - Champions (3): 2017, 2021, 2022
