= Banawa, Indonesia =

Banawa
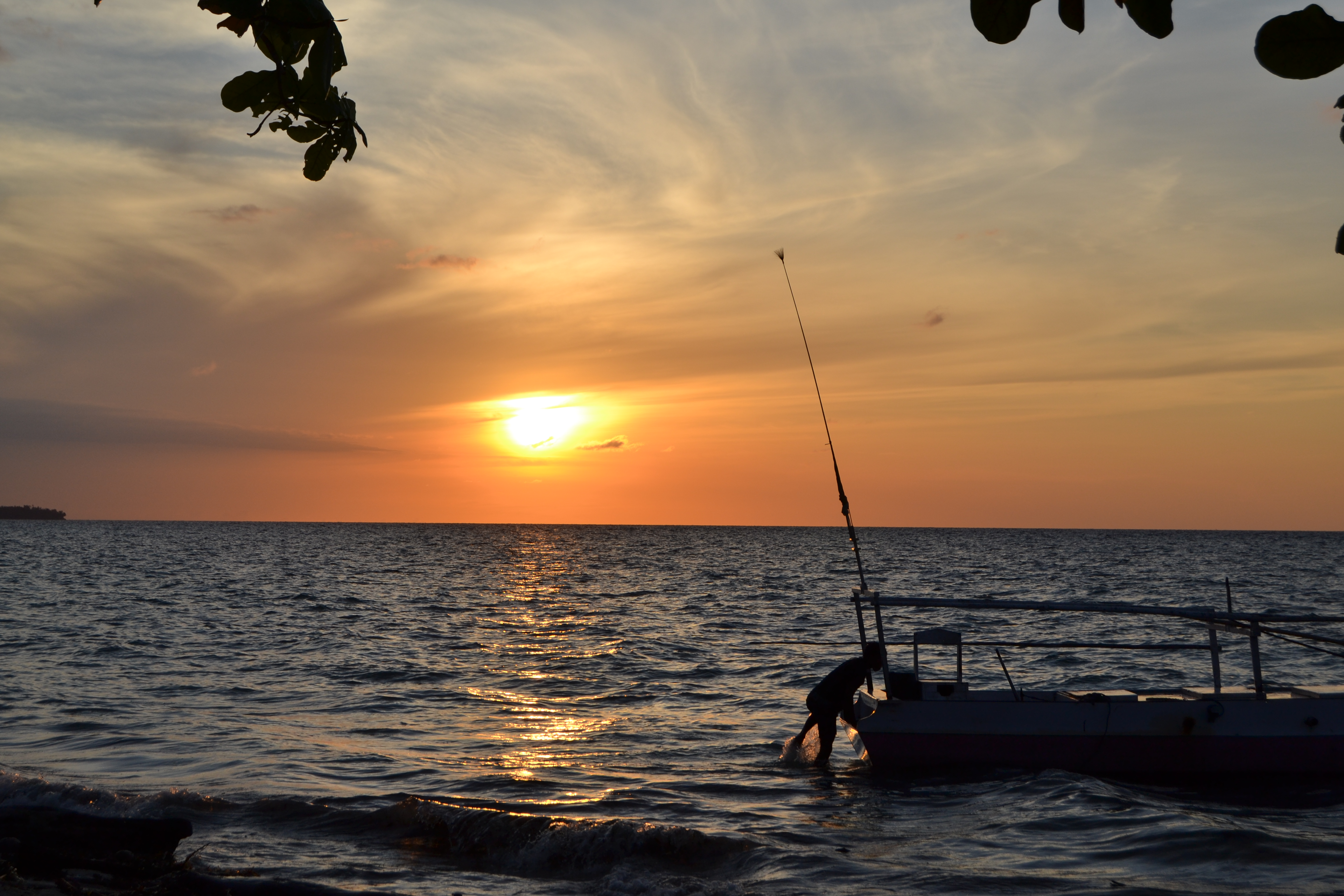
- Boneoge Beach in Banawa

- Location in Sulawesi
- Coordinates: 0°43′42.01″S 119°45′15.07″E
- Country: Indonesia
- Province: Central Sulawesi
- Regency: Donggala Regency

Area
  - Total: 99.04 km^{2} (38.24 sq mi)

Population
  - Total: 37,871
- Postal code: 94351

Banawa is an administrative district (kecamatan) of Donggala Regency, in Central Sulawesi Province of Indonesia. It contains the town of Donggala, which is the administrative headquarters of the Regency.

The Banawa District has the highest population density in Donggala Regency, with 373.5 people per km^{2} in mid-2022.

The capital of Donggala Regency was moved to Banawa following a decision in the Donggala Parliament which resulted in memorandum No. 16 1995.

== Climate ==
Banawa has a relatively dry tropical rainforest climate (Af) with moderate rainfall year-round.

Climate data for Banawa
| Month | Jan | Feb | Mar | Apr | May | Jun | Jul | Aug | Sep | Oct | Nov | Dec | Year |
|---|---|---|---|---|---|---|---|---|---|---|---|---|---|
| Mean daily maximum °C (°F) | 30.1 (86.2) | 30.3 (86.5) | 30.5 (86.9) | 30.5 (86.9) | 30.8 (87.4) | 29.9 (85.8) | 29.1 (84.4) | 30.5 (86.9) | 30.6 (87.1) | 31.8 (89.2) | 30.9 (87.6) | 30.6 (87.1) | 30.5 (86.8) |
| Daily mean °C (°F) | 26.4 (79.5) | 26.5 (79.7) | 26.6 (79.9) | 26.7 (80.1) | 27.1 (80.8) | 26.3 (79.3) | 25.4 (77.7) | 26.5 (79.7) | 26.4 (79.5) | 27.4 (81.3) | 26.8 (80.2) | 26.8 (80.2) | 26.6 (79.8) |
| Mean daily minimum °C (°F) | 22.7 (72.9) | 22.8 (73.0) | 22.8 (73.0) | 22.9 (73.2) | 23.5 (74.3) | 22.8 (73.0) | 21.7 (71.1) | 22.6 (72.7) | 22.3 (72.1) | 23.1 (73.6) | 22.8 (73.0) | 23.0 (73.4) | 22.8 (72.9) |
| Average rainfall mm (inches) | 112 (4.4) | 81 (3.2) | 98 (3.9) | 93 (3.7) | 76 (3.0) | 118 (4.6) | 95 (3.7) | 90 (3.5) | 108 (4.3) | 71 (2.8) | 89 (3.5) | 85 (3.3) | 1,116 (43.9) |
Source: Climate-Data.org
