= Banawa Selatan, Donggala =

Banawa Selatan
- Location in Sulawesi
- Coordinates: 0.8867487°S 119.6499162°E
- Country: Indonesia
- Province: Central Sulawesi
- Regency: Donggala Regency

Area
  - Total: 430.67 km^{2} (166.28 sq mi)

Population
  - Total: 26,199
- Postal code: 94351

Banawa Selatan (South Banawa) is an administrative district ([kecamatan) of Donggala Regency, in Central Sulawesi Province of Indonesia. The district capital is Watatu.
