= Gawalise Stadium =

Stadium in Central Sulawesi, Indonesia

- Location in Sulawesi
- Location: Palu, Central Sulawesi, Indonesia
- Coordinates: 0°55′22.67″S 119°50′22.39″E
- Owner: City government of Palu
- Operator: City government of Palu
- Capacity: 20,000
- Surface: Grass field

Tenants
- Persipal Palu; Celebest FC

Gawalise Stadium is a stadium in Palu, Central Sulawesi, Indonesia. The stadium the home of Persipal Palu and Celebest FC. It has a seating capacity of 20,000, the stadium category is C+. It is located in the southern part of the city close to the mountain range.

== See also ==
- List of stadiums in Indonesia
- List of stadiums by capacity
