= Celebest F.C. =

Indonesian football club

Celebest
- Full name: Celebest Football Club
- Nickname: Tanduk Anoa
- Founded: 11 February 2016; 10 years ago
- Ground: Gawalise Stadium
- Capacity: 20,000
- Owner: PT. Celebest Indonesia Andal
- CEO: Abdee Negara
- Manager: Ahmadi HB Buraera
- Coach: Budiardjo Thalib
- League: Liga 4
Home colours	Away colours

Celebest Football Club is a football club based in Palu, Central Sulawesi, Indonesia that competes in the Liga 4. Nicknamed Tanduk Anoa, it was founded as Villa 2000 in Pamulang, South Tangerang. The club changed its name to Celebest in 2016 and moved to Gawalise Stadium in the same year.

== History ==
Abdee Negara Nurdin, the frontman of Slank was the main person behind the formation of Celebest Football Club. With support from PT. Celebest Indonesia Andal, he was determined to bring back the glory of the Sulawesi football. 11 February 2016 was approved as the official foundation for Celebest Football Club, after the acquisition of Villa 2000 Football Club.

== Stadium ==
Celebest plays their home matches at Gawalise Stadium, after moving their homebase from Pamulang to Palu.

== Sponsorship ==
- Indofood
- Corsa Tire
- Mogu Mogu
- bareksa.com

== Personnel ==
=== Coaching staff ===
- Head coach: I Wayan Arsana
- Assistants: Firdaus Kindo, Rauf Haci, Akbar N.

== Season-by-season records ==
Season	League	Tier	Tms.	Pos.	Piala Indonesia
2017	Liga 2	2	61	4th, Relegation round	–
2018	Liga 3	3	32	4th, Third round	First round
2019	Liga 3	3	32	Eliminated in Pre-national round	First round
2020	Liga 3	3	season abandoned		–
2021–22	Liga 3	3	64	Eliminated in Provincial round	–
2022–23	Liga 3	3	season abandoned		–
2023–24	Liga 3	3	80	Eliminated in Provincial round	–
2024–25	Liga 4	4	64	4th, Third round	–
2025–26	Liga 4				

== Honours ==
- Liga 4 Central Sulawesi
  - Champions (2): 2024–25, 2025–26
