= Parigi Moutong Regency =

Regency in Central Sulawesi, Indonesia

Parigi Moutong Regency Kabupaten Parigi Moutong
- Regency
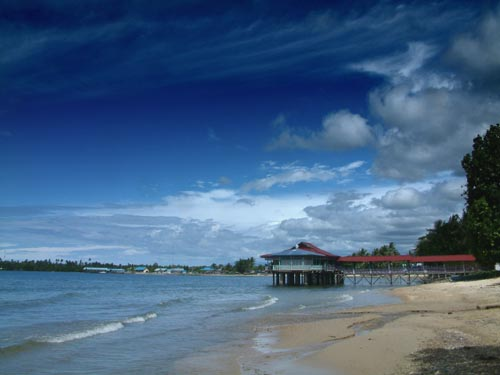
- Parigi Beach, Parigi Moutong

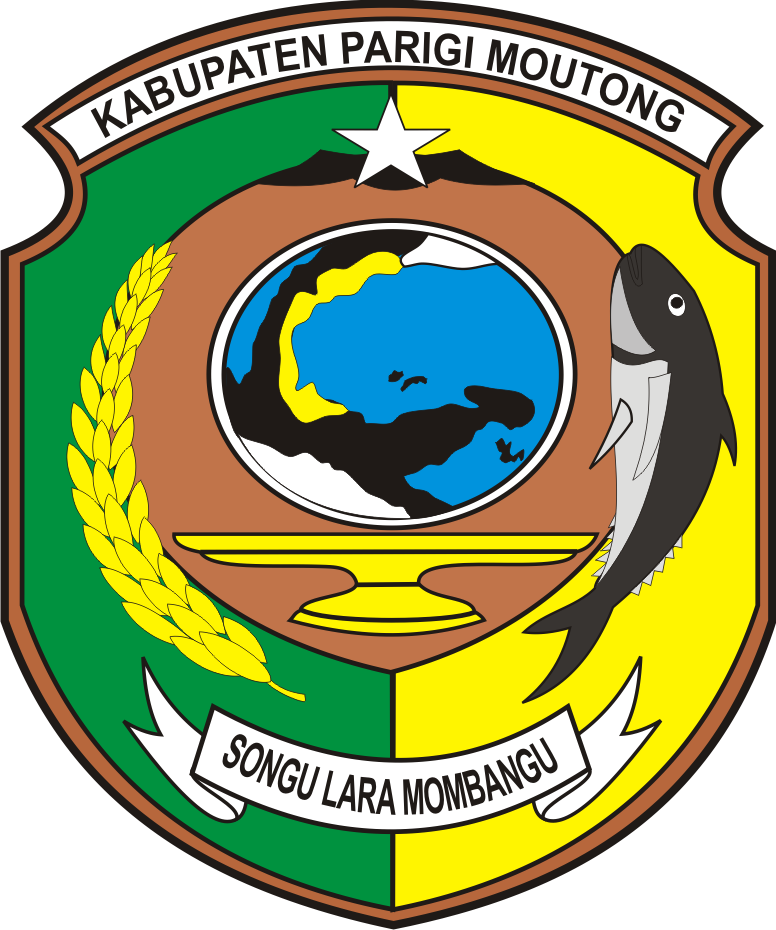
- Coat of arms
- Motto: Songu Lara Mombangu
- Location within Central Sulawesi

- Location in Sulawesi and Indonesia Parigi Moutong Regency (Indonesia)
- Coordinates: 0°55′54″S 120°11′39″E
- Country: Indonesia
- Province: Central Sulawesi
- Capital: Parigi

Government
  - Regent: Erwin Burase
  - Vice Regent: Abdul Sahid

Area
  - Total: 5,806.70 km^{2} (2,241.98 sq mi)

Population (mid 2025 estimate)
  - Total: 470,103
  - Density: 80.9587/km^{2} (209.682/sq mi)
- Time zone: UTC+8 (ICST)
- Area code: (+62) 450
- Website: parigimoutongkab.go.id

Parigi Moutong Regency is a regency of Central Sulawesi Province of Indonesia. The regency was created on 10 April 2002 by splitting off the eastern districts previously part of Donggala Regency. It covers an area of 5,806.70 km^{2} and had a population of 413,588 at the 2010 Census and 440,015 at the 2020 Census; the official estimate as of mid-2025 was 470,103 (comprising 240,264 males and 229,839 females). The principal town lies at Parigi in the south of the regency. The regency stretches from around Parigi district in its south all the way past Moutong district in the north, giving the name.

== Geography ==
In terms of its geographic position, Parigi Moutong Regency is bounded to the north by Buol Regency, Toli-Toli Regency, and the province of Gorontalo, to the south by Poso Regency and Sigi Regency, to the west by Palu City and Donggala Regency, and to the east by the Gulf of Tomini.

The regency has a coastline along the shore in the Gulf of Tomini of 472 kms, stretching from the Sausu District in the south as far as Moutong District (and Gorontalo Province) bordering on the north side.

== Administrative districts ==
Parigi Moutong Regency was divided at 2010 into twenty districts (kecamatan), but three additional districts were subsequently added. The districts are all tabulated below in geographical order, stretching clockwise around the Gulf of Tomini, with their areas and their populations at the 2010 Census and 2020 Census, together with the official estimates as of mid-2025. The districts are grouped for convenience into three geographical sectors, which have no administrative significance. The table also includes the locations of the district administrative centres, the number of villages in each district (a total of 278 rural desa and 5 urban kelurahan, the latter all being in Parigi District), and its post code.

Kode Wilayah	Name of District (kecamatan)	Area in km^{2}	Pop'n Census 2010	Pop'n Census 2020	Pop'n Estimate mid 2025	Admin centre	No. of villages	Post code
72.08.06	Sausu	229.59	21,484	21,571	21,265	Sausu Trans	10	94472
72.08.15	Balinggi	243.58	16,451	17,311	17,804	Malakosa	9	94473
72.08.09	Torue	264.39	18,757	20,094	20,499	Torue	7	94470
72.08.11	Parigi Selatan (South Parigi)	383.73	21,700	23,101	23,467	Dolago Padang	10	94461
72.08.01	Parigi (town) ^{(a)}	24.98	28,296	30,617	31,666	Masigi	11 ^{(a)}	94471
72.08.16	Parigi Barat (West Parigi)	119.60	7,127	8,295	9,260	Parigimpuu	8	94460
72.08.20	Parigi Tengah (Central Parigi)	64.96	8,197	9,154	9,573	Binangga	6	94462
72.08.19	Parigi Utara (North Parigi)	88.27	5,614	6,799	7,425	Toboli Barat	5	94463
	Southern (Parigi) Sector	1,419.10	127,626	136,942	140,959		66	
72.08.17	Siniu	99.20	8,682	9,981	10,598	Siniu Sayo Gindano	9	94467
72.08.02	Ampibabo	157.88	20,579	22,715	23,469	Ampibabo Utara	19	94474
72.08.13	Toribulu	213.97	16,380	17,384	17,993	Toribulu	9	94466
72.08.08	Kasimbar	291.07	20,848	23,183	25,469	Kasimbar	18	94464
72.08.10	Tinombo Selatan (South Tinombo)	370.89	25,550	27,763	30,050	Maninili	20	94468
72.08.23	Sidoan	287.93	^{(b)}	14,540	16,093	Muara Jaya	11	94475
72.08.03	Tinombo	318.83	34,252	20,174	25,328	Tinombo	15	94465
	Central Sector	1,739.77	126,291	135,740	149,000		101	
72.08.18	Palasa	578.34	26,292	26,096	30,794	Palasa	11	94477
72.08.05	Tomini	218.20	17,872	18,783	20,782	Tomini	14	94478
72.08.12	Mepanga	192.28	27,449	29,651	30,972	Mepanga	18	94476
72.08.22	Ongka Malino	374.49	^{(c)}	20,630	21,425	Ongka	17	94482
72.08.21	Bolano	156.15	^{(c)}	16,084	16,896	Bolano	13	94479
72.08.07	Bolano Lambunu	371.66	55,019	20,934	21,097	Lambunu	14	94480
72.08.14	Taopa	230.04	12,745	13,878	14,897	Taopa	11	94483
72.08.04	Moutong	526.67	20,294	21,277	23,281	Moutong Tengah	20	94481
	Northern (Tomini) Sector	2,647.83	159,671	167,333	180,144		118	
	Totals	5,806.70	413,588	440,015	470,103	Parigi	283	

Notes: (a) Parigi town district consists of the 5 kelurahan of Bantaya, Loji, Kampal, Maesa and Masigi, together with 6 desa.
(b) The 2010 population of the new Sidoan District is included with the figure for Tinombo District.
(c) The 2010 populations of the new Ongka Malino District and Bolano District are included with the figure for Bolano Lambunu District.

== Tomini languages ==
The Tomini languages, spoken in the eight last-named districts in the table above, belong to the putative Tomini-Tolitoli languages group.
