= Donggala Regency =

Regency in Central Sulawesi, Indonesia

Donggala Regency Kabupaten Donggala
- Regency
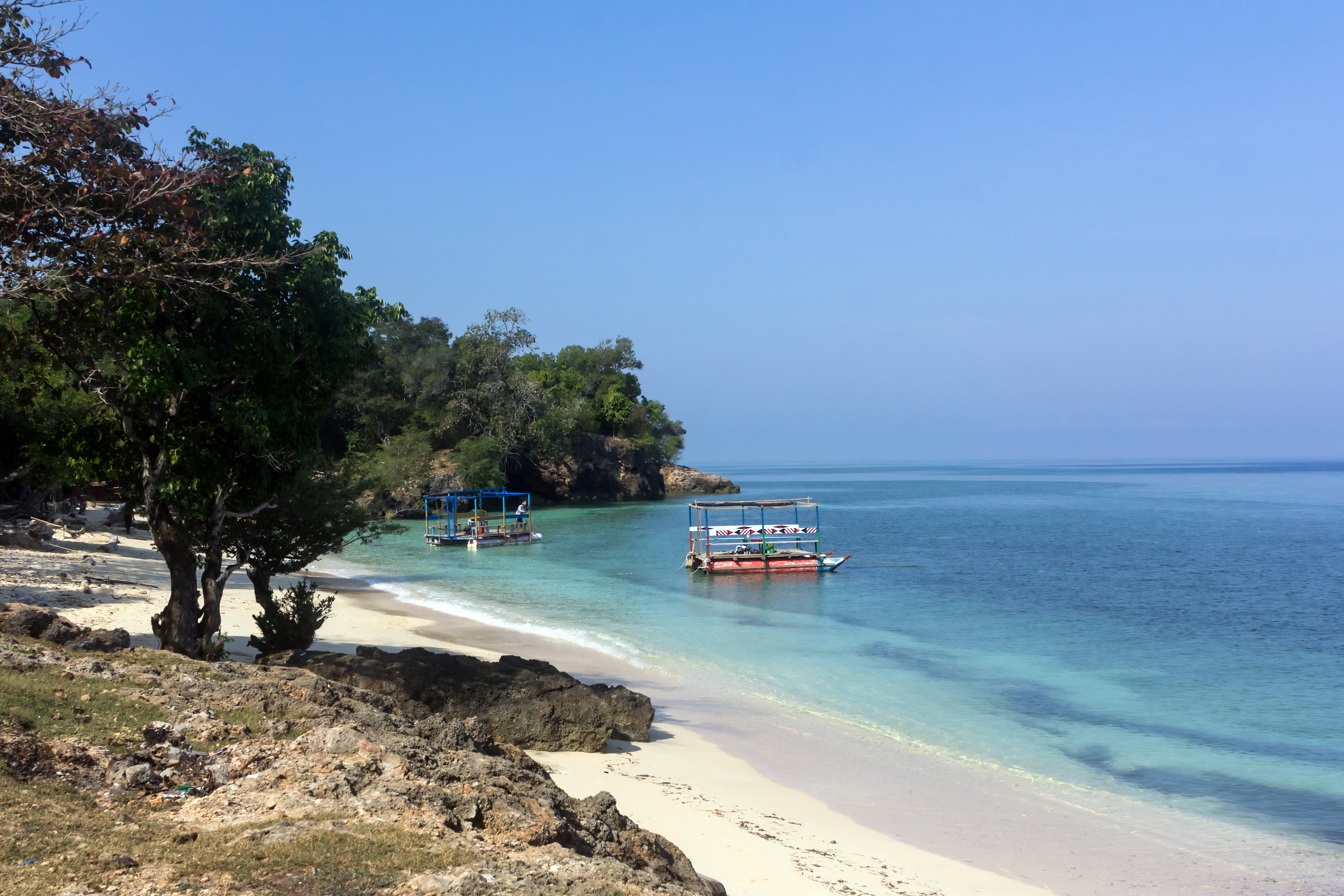
- Beach in Donggala, a week before the area was devastated by an earthquake and tsunami.

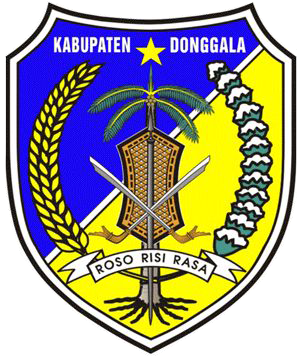
- Coat of arms
- Motto: Roso Risi Rasa (Kaili) (Strong Tough Prosperous)
- Location within Central Sulawesi

- Location in Sulawesi and Indonesia Donggala Regency (Indonesia)
- Coordinates: 0°41′40″S 119°43′50″E
- Country: Indonesia
- Province: Central Sulawesi
- Capital: Banawa

Government
  - Regent: Vera Elena Laruni
  - Vice Regent: Taufik Muhammad Burhan

Area
  - Total: 5,126.59 km^{2} (1,979.39 sq mi)

Population (mid 2025 estimate)
  - Total: 321,013
  - Density: 62.6173/km^{2} (162.178/sq mi)
- Time zone: UTC+8 (ICST)
- Area code: (+62) 451/457
- Website: donggala.go.id

Donggala Regency is a regency in the Central Sulawesi Province of Indonesia. It lies between 0° 30" north and 2°20" south latitude, and between 119° 45°" and 121° 45" east longitude, and covers a land area of 5,126.59 km^{2}. It had a population of 277,236 at the 2010 Census and 300,436 at the 2020 Census; the current official estimate as of mid-2025 is 321,011 (comprising 164,954 males and 156,057 females). The administrative capital of Donggala Regency is the town of Banawa, located a 30-minute drive (34 km) northwest from the city of Palu, the capital of the province.

== History ==
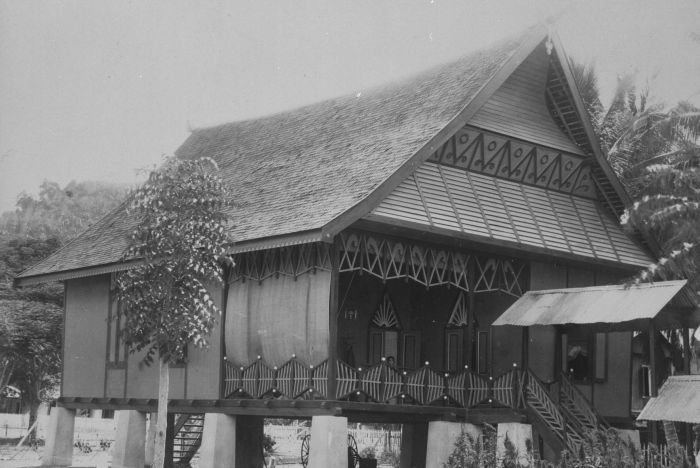
Home of the ruler of Donggala (1930s)

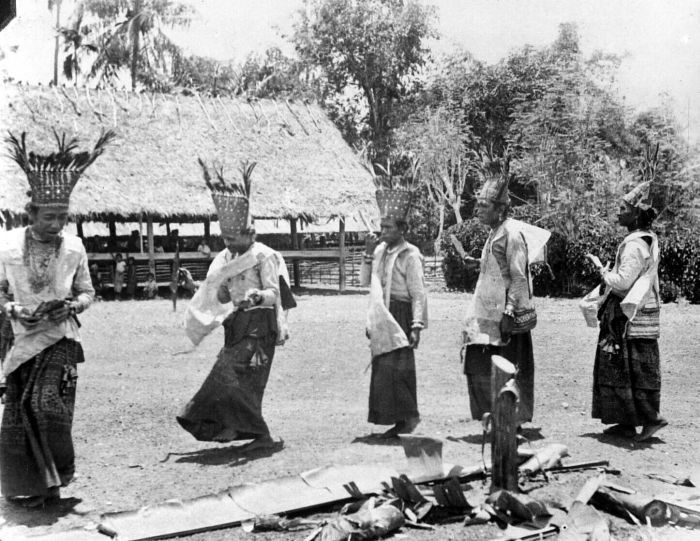
Priests perform a ritual in the Bora te Biromaru kampong

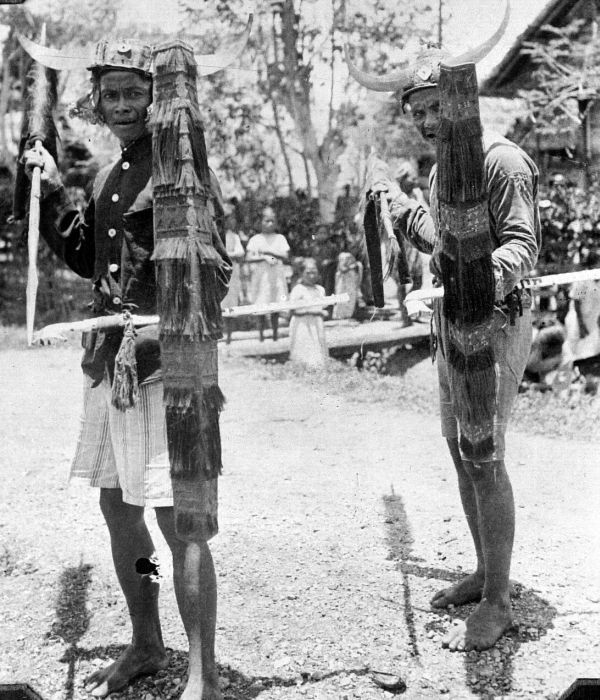
Indigenous people performing the Tjakalélé dance with spears and shields in Bora te Biromaru kampong

Before the Dutch assumed administration in 1904 under Governor-General J. B. van Heutsz, the Central Sulawesi area was the home of eight small kingdoms (kerajaan): Palu, Sigi Dolo, Kulawi, Biromaru, Banawa, Tawaili, Parigi, and Moutong.

Since the Donggala Regency was established on 4 July 1959, then comprising almost the entire western portion of Central Sulawesi Province (Buol Toti-Toli Regency, previously part of the regency, was split off from it at that date), it has been significantly reduced in area and population. The city of Palu was split off as a separate municipality on 22 July 1994, the Parigi Moutong Regency was split off on 10 April 2002, and the Sigi Regency was split off on 21 July 2008.

In September 2018, Donggala and Palu City suffered heavy casualties due to the 2018 Sulawesi earthquake and tsunami.

== Administrative districts ==
The Dongala Regency is divided into sixteen districts (kecamatan). These are physically divided into two non-contiguous sections, lying to the west and to the east of the Palu River Valley respectively, and separated from each other by Palu city and the Sigi Regency. The first (southern) section comprises five districts, of which the northern Banawa and Banawa Tengah (together known as Donggala town) were the areas most grievously inundated by the 2018 earthquake and tsunami. The second (northern) section comprises eleven districts, stretching south to north along the west coast of Sulawesi's northern peninsula.

These districts are tabulated below with their areas and their populations at the 2010 Census and 2020 Census, together with the official estimates of population as of mid-2025. The table also includes the locations of the district administrative centres, the number of administrative villages in each district (totaling 158 rural desa and 9 urban kelurahan - the latter all in Banawa District), and its postal codes.

Kode Wilayah	Name of District (kecamatan)	Area in km^{2}	Pop'n Census 2010	Pop'n Census 2020	Pop'n Estimate mid 2025	Admin centre	No. of villages	Post codes
72.03.04	Rio Pakava	872.16	21,820	21,331	23,693	Lalundu	14	94346
72.03.21	Pinembani	402.61	5,936	6,313	6,023	Gimpubia	9	94345
72.03.18	Banawa Selatan (South Banawa)	430.67	23,677	25,426	27,684	Watatu	19	94350
72.03.27	Banawa Tengah ^{(a)} (Central Banawa)	74.64	10,072	11,327	12,714	Limboro	8	94341
72.03.08	Banawa ^{(b)}	99.04	32,018	36,076	38,464	Gunung Bale	14	94351
	Southern section	1,879.12	93,523	100,473	108,578		64	
72.03.19	Tanantovea	302.64	15,182	15,860	17,372	Wani I	10	94342
72.03.09	Labuan	126.01	13,319	14,861	16,246	Labuan	7	94352
72.03.10	Sindue	177.19	18,436	21,024	23,355	Toaya	13	94353
72.03.24	Sindue Tombusabora	211.55	11,320	12,281	13,728	Tibo	6	94344
72.03.25	Sindue Tobata	211.92	8,775	9,920	10,784	Alindau	6	94343
72.03.11	Sirenja	286.94	20,206	21,812	23,400	Tompe	13	94354
72.03.12	Balaesang ^{(d)}	314.23	22,796	25,058	26,228	Tambu	13	94355
72.03.31	Balaesang Tanjung (Balaesang Peninsula)	188.85	10,350	12,540	12,456	Malei	8	94359
72.03.06	Dampelas (formerly Damsol)	732.76	28,938	32,032	32,471	Sabang	13	94356
72.03.14	Sojol ^{(e)}	705.41	25,419	25,340	26,777	Balukang	9	94357
72.03.30	Sojol Utara ^{(f)} (North Sojol)	139.07	9,356	9,235	9,616	Ogoamas II	5	94358
	Northern section	3,396.57	183,713	199,963	212,433		103	
	Totals	5,126.59	277,620	300,436	321,011	Banawa	167	

Notes: (a) including 2 offshore islands. (b) including 2 offshore islands.
(c) comprising 9 kelurahan (Boneoge, Boya, Ganti, Gunung Bale, Kabonga Besar, Kabonga Kecil, Labuan Bajo, Maleni and Lalombi) and 5 desa.
(d) including 17 offshore islands. (e) including 3 offshore islands. (f) including 6 offshore islands.

=== 2013 ===
Many of the districts of Donggala Regency, together with Palu City and some of the districts of Sigi Regency, were covered in the Rencana Pembangunan Jangka Panjang (Long-Term Development Plan) as of 2013. In all, the area of the Plan covered twenty-one districts.

- Balaesang
- Balaesang Tanjung (Balaesang Peninsula)
- Banawa, Central Sulawesi
- Banawa Selatan (South Banawa)
- Central Banawa
- Damsol (now Dampelas)
- Dolo
- Dolo Selatan (South Dolo)
- Gumbasa
- Kulawi
- Kulawi Selatan (South Kulawi)
- Labuan
- Marawola
- Pipikoro
- Palolo
- Rio Pakava
- Sigi-Biromaru
- Sirenja
- Sojol
- Tanambulava
- Tanantovea
- Tawaeli

== Tourist attractions ==
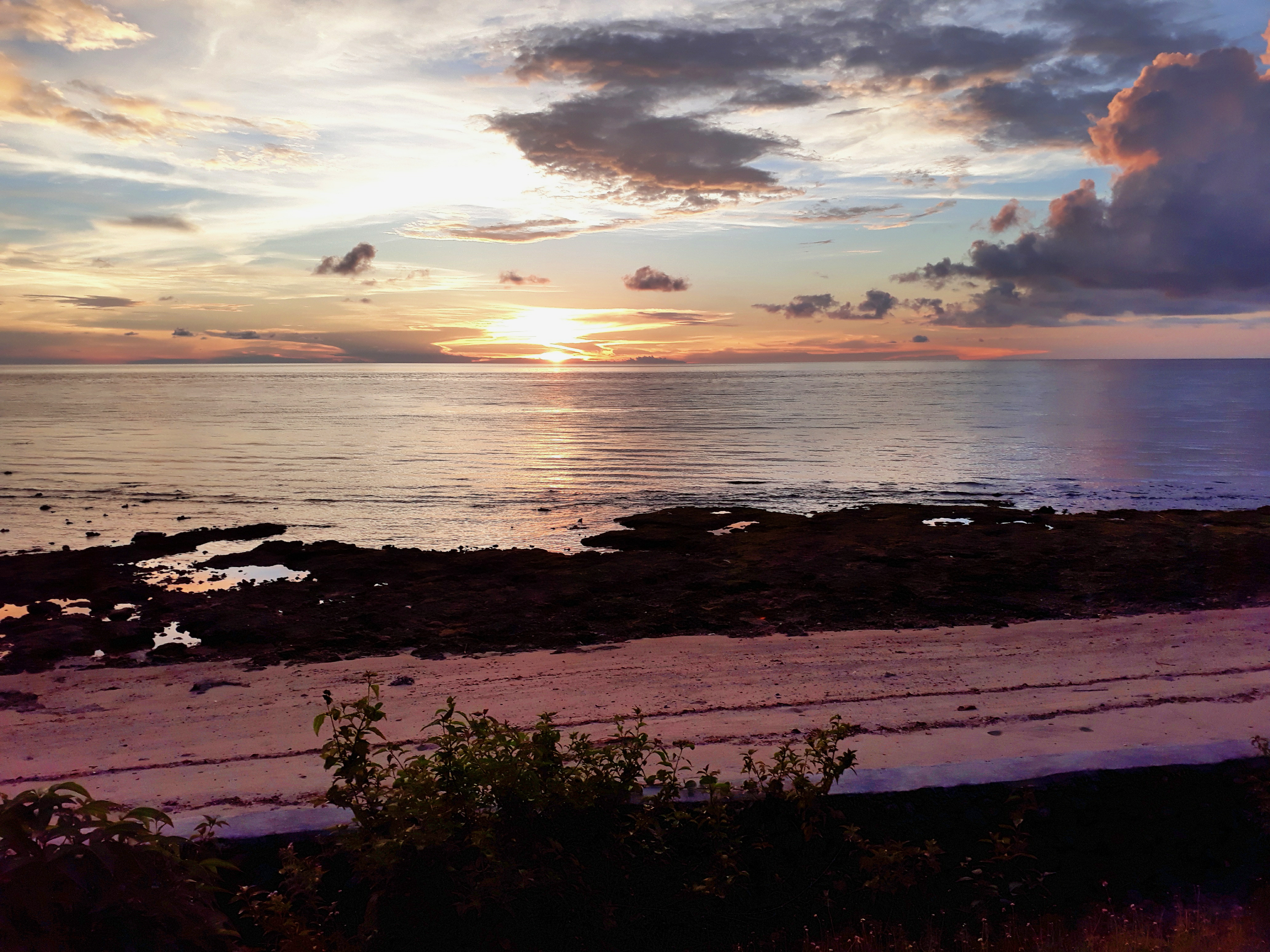
Beach at sunset in Donggala Regency

- Tanjung Karang Beach, Donggala, Labuan Bajo, Banawa
- Pusentasi (pusat Laut), Towale
- Boneoge Beach, Banawa
- Anjungan Gonenggati, Banawa
- Kabonga Beach, Banawa
- Art & Culture, Home Industry, Sarong Donggala, Salubomba village, Limboro, Watusampu, Kola-Kola, Ganti, Kabonga, Loli, Wani
- Gonenggati Mangrove Forest, Kabonga Besar, Banawa
- Enu Beach, Enu
- Bambarano Beach
- Kalukku Beach, Limboro
- Hayalan Beach, Salubomba
- Lembasada Beach, Lembasada
- Surumana Beach, Surumana
- Tosale Beach, Tosale
- Batusuya Beach, Batusuya
- Salur Beach, Sioyong, Sabang
- Taipa Beach, Taipa
- Parimpi Indah Beach, Lende, Sirenja
- Saget Beach and LendeNtovea, Sojol Utara
- Majang Beach, Long Village, Damsol
- Sivalenta Beach Sirenja
- Salumbone Beach, Salumbone
- Labuana Beach, Lende Ntovea, Sirenja
- Lake Talaga
- Lake Dampelas
- Rano Lake
- Lino Lake, Lino
- Talaga Lake, Dampelas
- Kaledo (soup)
- Bambahano, Sabang
- Pasoso Island, Balaesang
- Maputi Island, Pangalaseang
- Taring Island, Lenju, Sojol Utara
- Loli Tasiburi Waterfall
- Powelua Waterfall, Banawa Tengah
- Walandanu Waterfall, Balaesang
- Bou Waterfall, Bou, Damsol
- Nupabomba Waterfall, Nupabomba
- Bale Waterfall, Bale, Tanantovea
- Ogoamas Waterfall, Sojol Utara
- Hotspring, Tambu Village
- Camping Ground Nupabomba, Nupabomba
- Pemandian Loli Indah, Loli Oge, Banawa
- Nature Reserve Sojol Mountain, Sojol
