= 2014 Liga Nusantara Yogyakarta =

Liga Nusantara Yogyakarta
- Season: 2014

The 2014 Liga Nusantara Yogyakarta season is the first edition of Liga Nusantara Yogyakarta is a qualifying round of the 2014 Liga Nusantara.

The competition scheduled starts in May 2014.

== Teams ==
Liga Nusantara Yogyakarta will be followed five clubs namely Sleman United, Persig Gunungkidul, Protaba Bantul, Gelora Handayani Gunungkidul and Persikup Kulonprogo.

=== Stadium and locations ===
Club	Regency or City	Stadium	Capacity	2013 season
Gelora Handayani Gunungkidul	Gunung Kidul	Gelora Handayani	10,000	Played in Third Division
Persig Gunungkidul	Gunung Kidul	Gelora Handayani	10,000	Played in Third Division
Persikup Kulonprogo	Kulon Progo	Cangkring	7,000	Played in Third Division
Protaba Bantul	Bantul	Sultan Agung	35,000	Played in Second Division
Sleman United	Sleman	Maguwoharjo	40,000	Played in Third Division

== League table ==
Pos	Team	Pld	W	D	L	GF	GA	GD	Pts	Qualification
1	Gelora Handayani Gunungkidul	0	0	0	0	0	0	0	0	Advances to National round play-off
2	Persig Gunungkidul	0	0	0	0	0	0	0	0	
3	Persikup Kulonprogo	0	0	0	0	0	0	0	0	
4	Protaba	0	0	0	0	0	0	0	0	
5	Sleman United	0	0	0	0	0	0	0	0	

Updated to match(es) played on 13 April 2014. Source: 2014 Liga Nusantara Yogya table
Rules for classification: 1) points; 2) goal difference; 3) number of goals scored.

== Result ==
PSSI sets the standard every team must play as many as 15 games in a span of five months in the regional round, each region should ideally have a minimum of nine participants. But, it is not can not be tricked, Liga Nusantaa Yogyakarta may be held in the format of three rounds. The first and second rounds held by sisteme home and away, while the third round was held at a neutral stadium.

=== Week 1-10 ===
Home \ Away	GHG	PSIG	PKUP	PTB	SLU
Gelora Handayani Gunungkidul					
Persig Gunungkidul					
Persikup Kulonprogo					
Protaba					
Sleman United					

Updated to match(es) played on 13 April 2014. Source: 2014 Liga Nusantara Yogya results
Legend: Blue = home team win; Yellow = draw; Red = away team win.

=== Week 11-15 ===
Home \ Away	GHG	PSIG	PKUP	PTB	SLU
Gelora Handayani Gunungkidul					
Persig Gunungkidul					
Persikup Kulonprogo					
Protaba					
Sleman United					

Updated to match(es) played on 13 April 2014. Source: 2014 Liga Nusantara Yogya results
Legend: Blue = home team win; Yellow = draw; Red = away team win.
