= 2022 Liga 3 Special Region of Yogyakarta =

Tournament details
- Country: Indonesia
- Dates: 25 October - TBD 2022
- Teams: 18
- Qualified to: Liga 3 National round

The 2022 Liga 3 Special Region of Yogyakarta will be the fifth season of Liga 3 Special Region of Yogyakarta as a qualifying round for the national round of the 2022–23 Liga 3.

Mataram Utama were the defending champion. They were promoted to the 2022-23 Liga 2 following the conclusion of last season's national round, however they relinquished their Liga 2 spot to Nusantara United.

== Teams ==
There are 18 teams participated in the league this season.

No	Team	Location
01	JK United	Bantul
02	Persiba	Bantul
03	PS Baturetno	Bantul
04	PS HW UMY	Bantul
05	Bantul United	Bantul
06	Duta Pro Bina Taruna KCM	Bantul
07	Gunung Kidul Tigers	Gunungkidul
08	Persikup	Kulon Progo
09	Raga Putra Menoreh	Kulon Progo
10	Satria Adikarta	Kulon Progo
11	PSTN Sleman	Sleman
12	Indonesia Muda	Yogyakarta
13	Gadjah Mada	Yogyakarta
14	Mataram Utama Manggala	Yogyakarta
15	PS Tunas Jogja	Yogyakarta
16	Jogja Istimewa Football	Yogyakarta
17	UAD FC	Yogyakarta
18	FC UNY	Yogyakarta

== First round ==
=== Group A ===
Pos	Team	Pld	W	D	L	GF	GA	GD	Pts	Qualification	IND	UMY	JIF	JKU	BAT	KCM
1	Indonesia Muda	0	0	0	0	0	0	0	0	Advance to Second round	—					
2	PS HW UMY	0	0	0	0	0	0	0	0	Advance to Second round		—				
3	Jogja Istimewa Football	0	0	0	0	0	0	0	0				—			
4	JK United	0	0	0	0	0	0	0	0					—		
5	PS Baturetno	0	0	0	0	0	0	0	0						—	
6	Duta Pro Bina Taruna KCM	0	0	0	0	0	0	0	0							—

Updated to match(es) played on unknown. Source: Liga 3 2022 Special Region of Yogyakarta

=== Group B ===
Pos	Team	Pld	W	D	L	GF	GA	GD	Pts	Qualification	UAD	GJM	UNY	TJG	PKP	PBA
1	UAD FC	0	0	0	0	0	0	0	0	Advance to Second round	—					
2	Gadjah Mada	0	0	0	0	0	0	0	0	Advance to Second round		—				
3	FC UNY	0	0	0	0	0	0	0	0				—			
4	PS Tunas Jogja	0	0	0	0	0	0	0	0					—		
5	Persikup	0	0	0	0	0	0	0	0						—	
6	Persiba	0	0	0	0	0	0	0	0							—

Updated to match(es) played on unknown. Source: Liga 3 2022 Special Region of Yogyakarta

=== Group C ===
Pos	Team	Pld	W	D	L	GF	GA	GD	Pts	Qualification	MUM	BUN	GKT	TNG	SAT	RPM
1	Mataram Utama Manggala	0	0	0	0	0	0	0	0	Advance to Second round	—					
2	Bantul United	0	0	0	0	0	0	0	0	Advance to Second round		—				
3	Gunung Kidul Tigers	0	0	0	0	0	0	0	0				—			
4	PSTN Sleman	0	0	0	0	0	0	0	0					—		
5	Satria Adikarta	0	0	0	0	0	0	0	0						—	
6	Raga Putra Menoreh	0	0	0	0	0	0	0	0							—

Updated to match(es) played on unknown. Source: Liga 3 2022 Special Region of Yogyakarta

== Second round ==
Wait for the first round to finish.
