= 2014 Liga Nusantara =

Liga Nusantara
- Season: 2014
- Champions: Persatu Tuban
- Promoted: Persatu Tuban; Laga; Perssu Sumenep; PS Badung; Perserang Serang; Persibas Banyumas
- Best Player: Edi Winarno
- Top goalscorer: Imam Bagus Kurnia (4 goals)

The 2014 Liga Nusantara season is the first edition of Liga Nusantara after the Second Division and Third Division merged on 2014 season. After the removal of Badan Liga Sepakbola Amatir Indonesia (BLAI) Liga Nusantara as amateur competition this season is managed by competition committee of Province Association for qualification round and managed by PSSI in national round.

The competition started on 4 May 2014 and finished with the national final match on 14 December 2014. Persatu Tuban became champions after beating Laga FC 2-1 in the final.

== Format ==
Preliminary round held by the respective provincial associations. All clubs must play with a home away system, with a standard number of games that run every club must be at least 15 games per season.

Regional round is divided into 6 regional: Sumatra, Java, Borneo, Bali-Nusa, Sulawesi-Maluku, Papua. System home tournament with a round robin format. 2 clubs from each region will qualify for the national round.

National round total of 16 clubs who competed consists of 12 clubs qualify from the regional round as well as four clubs rank 3, 4, 5 and 6 in 2014 First Division. Systems home tournament with a round robin format. The top 6 club gets ticket promotion to the Premier Division next season.

Each team can register one foreign player in this competition.

== Teams ==
The league is scheduled to follow various amateur clubs in all provinces in Indonesia. Recruitment club in this league handed to each Provincial Association (Asprov).

If there are 10 amateur clubs included in one province, then only one club that represents the province to the national round. Likewise onwards, with multiples of 10 to 1. If the province has 20 amateur clubs, it would have taken two teams to qualify for the national round. If there are provinces that have less than 10 amateur clubs, the representative from the province will follow the playoffs with representatives from other provinces.

== Preliminary round ==
Divided into 33 to 34 provincial league play since May 2014.

=== Sumatra Region ===
Divided into 10 provincial league:

| # | Province | Teams |
|---|---|---|
| 1 | Aceh | Persip Pasee; Persitas Takengon |
| 2 | North Sumatra | Patriot Medan; PSDS Deli Serdang |
| 3 | West Sumatra | PS GAS Sawahlunto |
| 4 | Riau | Nabil; Persikalis Bengkalis |
| 5 | Riau Islands | PS Batam |
| 6 | Bengkulu | PS Benteng |
| 7 | Jambi | Bungo Putra |
| 8 | Bangka Belitung | Persipas Pangkalpinang |
| 9 | South Sumatra | Persimuba Musi Banyuasin |
| 10 | Lampung | Persilab West Lampung |

=== Java Region ===
Divided into 6 provincial league:

| # | Province | Teams |
|---|---|---|
| 1 | Banten | Persitangsel South Tangerang |
| 2 | West Java | Persitas Tasikmalaya; Bandung Barat United; Persigar Garut |
| 3 | Jakarta | Persija Muda; Urakan |
| 4 | Central Java | Persekap Pekalongan |
| 5 | Yogyakarta | Sleman United |
| 6 | East Java | Perssu Sumenep; Laga; Blitar United |

=== Kalimantan Region ===
Divided into 5 provincial league:

| # | Province | Teams |
|---|---|---|
| 1 | West Kalimantan | — |
| 2 | Central Kalimantan | PS PU Putra Palangkaraya |
| 3 | South Kalimantan | — |
| 4 | East Kalimantan | PS Penajam Utama |
| 5 | North Kalimantan | — |

=== Sulawesi and Maluku Islands Region ===
Divided into 8 provincial league:

| # | Province | Teams |
|---|---|---|
| 1 | South Sulawesi | — |
| 2 | Southeast Sulawesi | — |
| 3 | Central Sulawesi | Persipal Palu |
| 4 | West Sulawesi | ASA |
| 5 | Gorontalo | Persidago Gorontalo |
| 6 | North Sulawesi | Persma 1960 |
| 7 | Maluku | Arrow |
| 8 | North Maluku | — |

=== Nusa Tenggara Islands Region ===
Divided into 3 provincial league:

| # | Province | Teams |
|---|---|---|
| 1 | Bali | Pro Kundalini |
| 2 | West Nusa Tenggara | PS Mataram |
| 3 | East Nusa Tenggara | — |

=== Papua Region ===
Divided into 2 provincial league:

| # | Province | Teams |
|---|---|---|
| 1 | West Papua | Kaimana |
| 2 | Papua | Persintan Intan Jaya; Persimi Sarmi |

== Regional round ==
Followed by the best teams from every province in Indonesia. This round divided into 6 regional tournament. Two best teams in each region qualify for national round.

| Rank | Province | Teams |
|---|---|---|
| 1 | West Java | 3 |
| 1 | East Java | 3 |
| 3 | Aceh | 2 |
| 3 | North Sumatera | 2 |
| 3 | West Sumatera | 2 |
| 3 | Riau | 2 |
| 3 | Jakarta | 2 |
| 3 | Papua | 2 |
| | Riau Islands | |
Jambi
South Sumatera
Bangka Belitung

| Rank | Province | Teams |
|---|---|---|
| 9 | Bengkulu | 1 |
| 9 | Lampung | 1 |
| 9 | Banten | 1 |
| 9 | Central Java | 1 |
| 9 | Yogyakarta | 1 |
| 9 | Bali | 1 |
| 9 | West Nusa Tenggara | 1 |
| 9 | Central Kalimantan | 1 |
| 9 | East Kalimantan | 1 |
| 9 | North Sulawesi | 1 |
| 9 | Gorontalo | 1 |

| Rank | Province | Teams |
|---|---|---|
| | Central Sulawesi | |
West Sulawesi
Maluku
West Papua
| 28 | West Kalimantan | 0 |
| 28 | North Kalimantan | 0 |
| 28 | South Kalimantan | 0 |
| 28 | East Nusa Tenggara | 0 |
| 28 | South Sulawesi | 0 |
| 28 | Southeast Sulawesi | 0 |
| 28 | North Maluku | 0 |

=== Play-off ===
Play on 27 October 2014 1st Leg and 31 October 2014 2nd Leg

| Team 1 | Agg. | Team 2 | 1st leg | 2nd leg |
|---|---|---|---|---|
| PSDS Deli Serdang | 1–1 (1–3 p) | Persitas Takengon | 1–0 | 0–1 |
| Persilab Lampung Barat | 0–1 | Persimuba Musi Banyuasin | 0–0 | 0–1 |
| PS Batam | 3–2 | Persikalis Bengkalis | 1–1 | 2–1 |
| Bungo Putra | 1–2 | Persipas Pangkal Pinang | 0–0 | 1–2 |
| PS GAS Sawahlunto | 3–4 | PS Benteng Bengkulu Tengah | 3–2 | 0–2 |
| Persitangsel Tangerang Selatan | 3–4 | Persekap Pekalongan | 2–2 | 1–2 |
| Persigar Garut | 5–0 | Urakan | 5–0 | 0–0 |
| Blitar United | 4–2 | Sleman United | 2–1 | 2–1 |
| PU Putra Palangkaraya | 4–2 | Penajam Utama | 2–1 | 2–1 |
| Arrow FC Ambon | 0–2 | Persma Manado | 0–1 | 0–1 |
| ASA | 1–2 | Persidago Gorontalo | 1–0 | 0–2 |
| PS Mataram | 0–4 | Pro Kundalini | 0–2 | 0–2 |
| Persimi Sarmi | 1–8 | Kaimana | 1–4 | 0–4 |

=== Group stage ===
24 teams from the regional round will compete. Matches for the Group stage will be played from 9–13 November 2014.

==== Group 1 ====
- Matches were played in Citra Mas Stadium, Batam.

| Team | Pld | W | D | L | GF | GA | GD | Pts |
|---|---|---|---|---|---|---|---|---|
| Patriot Medan | 3 | 2 | 1 | 0 | 9 | 6 | +3 | 7 |
| PS Batam | 3 | 2 | 0 | 1 | 9 | 5 | +4 | 6 |
| Persip Pasee | 3 | 1 | 1 | 1 | 7 | 4 | +3 | 4 |
| Persitas Takengon | 3 | 0 | 0 | 3 | 4 | 14 | −10 | 0 |

==== Group 2 ====
- Matches were played in Depati Amir Stadium, Pangkal Pinang.

| Team | Pld | W | D | L | GF | GA | GD | Pts |
|---|---|---|---|---|---|---|---|---|
| Persipas Pangkal Pinang | 2 | 1 | 1 | 0 | 6 | 1 | +5 | 4 |
| PS Benteng Bengkulu Tengah | 2 | 1 | 1 | 0 | 2 | 1 | +1 | 4 |
| Nabil | 2 | 0 | 0 | 2 | 0 | 6 | −6 | 0 |

==== Group 3 ====
- Matches were played in Si Jalak Harupat Stadium, Bandung Regency.

| Team | Pld | W | D | L | GF | GA | GD | Pts |
|---|---|---|---|---|---|---|---|---|
| Persigar Garut | 3 | 2 | 0 | 1 | 7 | 2 | +5 | 6 |
| Persimuba Musi Banyuasin | 3 | 2 | 0 | 1 | 7 | 2 | +5 | 6 |
| Bandung Barat United | 3 | 2 | 0 | 1 | 3 | 5 | −2 | 6 |
| Persija Muda | 3 | 0 | 0 | 3 | 1 | 9 | −8 | 0 |

==== Group 4 ====
- Matches were played in Brantas Stadium, Batu, Malang.

| Team | Pld | W | D | L | GF | GA | GD | Pts |
|---|---|---|---|---|---|---|---|---|
| Laga F.C. | 3 | 3 | 0 | 0 | 8 | 0 | +8 | 9 |
| Persekap Pekalongan | 3 | 1 | 1 | 1 | 1 | 3 | −2 | 4 |
| Blitar United | 3 | 0 | 2 | 1 | 1 | 3 | −2 | 2 |
| Persitas Tasikmalaya | 3 | 0 | 1 | 2 | 1 | 5 | −4 | 1 |

==== Group 5 ====
- Matches were played in A. Yani Stadium, Sumenep.

| Team | Pld | W | D | L | GF | GA | GD | Pts |
|---|---|---|---|---|---|---|---|---|
| Perssu Sumenep | 3 | 3 | 0 | 0 | 7 | 1 | +6 | 9 |
| Persipal Palu | 3 | 2 | 0 | 1 | 6 | 3 | +3 | 6 |
| Pro Kundalini | 3 | 1 | 0 | 2 | 3 | 4 | −1 | 3 |
| PU Putra Palangkaraya | 3 | 0 | 0 | 3 | 1 | 9 | −8 | 0 |

==== Group 6 ====
- Matches were played in Mandala Stadium, Jayapura.

| Team | Pld | W | D | L | GF | GA | GD | Pts |
|---|---|---|---|---|---|---|---|---|
| Persintan Intan Jaya | 2 | 1 | 1 | 0 | 3 | 0 | +3 | 4 |
| Kaimana | 2 | 1 | 1 | 0 | 3 | 2 | +1 | 4 |
| Persma Manado | 2 | 0 | 0 | 2 | 2 | 6 | −4 | 0 |

== National round ==
Sixteen teams will play in this round including four teams from the fourth round of First Division. Top six teams will be promoted to the 2015 Premier Division.

=== First round ===
This stage will use home tournament format and will be played from 23–27 November 2014.

==== Group 7 ====
- Matches were played in Maulana Yusuf Stadium, Serang.

| Pos | Team | Pld | W | D | L | GF | GA | GD | Pts | Qualification or relegation |
|---|---|---|---|---|---|---|---|---|---|---|
| 1 | Perserang Serang | 3 | 2 | 1 | 0 | 6 | 2 | +4 | 7 | Advances to Second round |
| 2 | PS Batam | 3 | 1 | 2 | 0 | 2 | 1 | +1 | 5 | Advances to Second round |
| 3 | Persipas Pangkal Pinang | 3 | 1 | 0 | 2 | 3 | 6 | −3 | 3 | |
| 4 | Persimuba Musi Banyuasin | 3 | 0 | 1 | 2 | 1 | 3 | −2 | 1 | |

Updated to match(es) played on 27 November 2014. Source: Liga Nusantara

==== Group 8 ====
- Matches were played in Satria Stadium, Purwokerto.

| Pos | Team | Pld | W | D | L | GF | GA | GD | Pts | Qualification or relegation |
|---|---|---|---|---|---|---|---|---|---|---|
| 1 | Persigar Garut | 2 | 0 | 2 | 0 | 3 | 3 | 0 | 2 | Advances to Second round |
| 2 | Persibas Banyumas | 2 | 0 | 2 | 0 | 2 | 2 | 0 | 2 | Advances to Second round |
| 3 | PS Benteng Bengkulu Tengah | 2 | 0 | 2 | 0 | 1 | 1 | 0 | 2 | |

Updated to match(es) played on 27 November 2014. Source: Liga Nusantara

==== Group 9 ====
- Matches were played in Surajaya Stadium, Lamongan.

| Pos | Team | Pld | W | D | L | GF | GA | GD | Pts | Qualification or relegation |
|---|---|---|---|---|---|---|---|---|---|---|
| 1 | Persatu Tuban | 3 | 2 | 1 | 0 | 9 | 2 | +7 | 7 | Advances to Second round |
| 2 | Perssu Sumenep | 3 | 1 | 2 | 0 | 4 | 2 | +2 | 5 | Advances to Second round |
| 3 | Persekap Pekalongan | 3 | 1 | 0 | 2 | 2 | 5 | −3 | 3 | |
| 4 | Kaimana F.C. | 3 | 0 | 1 | 2 | 3 | 9 | −6 | 1 | |

Updated to match(es) played on 27 November 2014. Source: Liga Nusantara

==== Group 10 ====
- Matches were played in Brantas Stadium, Batu, Malang.

| Pos | Team | Pld | W | D | L | GF | GA | GD | Pts | Qualification or relegation |
|---|---|---|---|---|---|---|---|---|---|---|
| 1 | Laga F.C. | 3 | 2 | 1 | 0 | 6 | 3 | +3 | 7 | Advances to Second round |
| 2 | PS Badung | 3 | 1 | 1 | 1 | 6 | 5 | +1 | 4 | Advances to Second round |
| 3 | Persipal Palu | 3 | 0 | 2 | 1 | 4 | 6 | −2 | 2 | |
| 4 | Persintan Intan Jaya | 3 | 0 | 2 | 1 | 1 | 3 | −2 | 2 | |

Updated to match(es) played on 27 November 2014. Source: Liga Nusantara

=== Second round ===
This round will be played in Yogyakarta. Matches will be played from 4–10 December 2014.

==== Group 11 ====
| Pos | Team | Pld | W | D | L | GF | GA | GD | Pts | Qualification or relegation |
|---|---|---|---|---|---|---|---|---|---|---|
| 1 | Perssu Sumenep | 3 | 1 | 2 | 0 | 4 | 2 | +2 | 5 | Advances to Knockout stage Promoted to Liga Indonesia Premier Division |
| 2 | PS Badung | 3 | 1 | 1 | 1 | 1 | 2 | −1 | 4 (Note: PS Badung wins head-to-head against Perserang Serang) | Advances to Knockout stage Promoted to Liga Indonesia Premier Division |
| 3 | Perserang Serang | 3 | 1 | 1 | 1 | 2 | 2 | 0 | 4 | Promoted to Liga Indonesia Premier Division |
| 4 | Persigar Garut | 3 | 0 | 2 | 1 | 3 | 4 | −1 | 2 | |

Source: Liga Nusantara

==== Group 12 ====
| Pos | Team | Pld | W | D | L | GF | GA | GD | Pts | Qualification or relegation |
|---|---|---|---|---|---|---|---|---|---|---|
| 1 | Laga F.C. | 3 | 2 | 1 | 0 | 6 | 3 | +3 | 7 | Advances to Knockout stage Promoted to Liga Indonesia Premier Division |
| 2 | Persatu Tuban | 3 | 2 | 0 | 1 | 9 | 4 | +5 | 6 | Advances to Knockout stage Promoted to Liga Indonesia Premier Division |
| 3 | Persibas Banyumas | 3 | 1 | 1 | 1 | 8 | 5 | +3 | 4 | Promoted to Liga Indonesia Premier Division |
| 4 | PS Batam | 3 | 0 | 0 | 3 | 1 | 13 | −12 | 0 | |

Source: Liga Nusantara

=== Knockout stage ===
Semifinal matches will be played on December 12, 2014 and the final match will be played on December 14, 2014, also in Yogyakarta.

Semi-finals
12 December – Yogyakarta
Laga F.C. | 2
Perssu Sumenep | 1
12 December – Yogyakarta
Persatu Tuban | 2
PS Badung | 1

Final
14 December – Yogyakarta
Laga F.C. | 1
Persatu Tuban | 2
Third place
14 December – Yogyakarta
Perssu Sumenep | 3
PS Badung | 0

==== Semifinals ====
| Team 1 | Score | Team 2 |
|---|---|---|
| Laga F.C. | 2 – 1 | Perssu Sumenep |
| Persatu Tuban | 2 – 1 | PS Badung |

==== Third-placed ====
| Team 1 | Score | Team 2 |
|---|---|---|
| Perssu Sumenep | 3 – 0 | PS Badung |

==== Final ====
| Team 1 | Score | Team 2 |
|---|---|---|
| Persatu Tuban | 2 – 1 | Laga F.C. |

== Champions ==
Liga Nusantara 2014 champions
Persatu Tuban
