= 2017 Liga 3 Special Region of Yogyakarta =

Liga 3 Special Region of Yogyakarta
- Season: 2017

The 2017 Liga 3 Special Region of Yogyakarta season is the third edition of Liga 3 Special Region of Yogyakarta is a qualifying round of the 2017 Liga 3. Gama F.C. are the defending champions.

The competition scheduled starts in April 2017.

== Teams ==
This season there are 10 club will participate the league.

Teams
Persig Gunungkidul
Persikup Kulonprogo
Protaba Bantul
Gama F.C.
UAD F.C.
FC UNY
Jogja Istimewa Football
Tunas Jogja
Satria Adikarta F.C.
HW UMY
