= 2014 Liga Nusantara North Sumatra =

Liga Nusantara North Sumatra
- Season: 2014

The 2014 Liga Nusantara North Sumatra season was the first edition of Liga Nusantara North Sumatra as a qualifying round of the 2014 Liga Nusantara. The competition started in May 2014.

== Teams ==
The 2014 Liga Nusantara in North Sumatra Province Association consisted of 42 clubs following a variety of eligibility requirements.

== Format & regulations ==
The Association of North Sumatra Province prepared implementing regulations that the Liga Nusantara presented to the clubs' managers on 2 May 2014.

== League table & result ==
42 clubs of Liga Nusantara North Sumatra divided into five groups.

=== Group A ===
| Pos | Team | Pld | W | D | L | GF | GA | GD | Pts | Qualification | PSTM | MSC | KMC | MDKW | GMR | PATR | PTPN3 | PSKB | PSL |
|---|---|---|---|---|---|---|---|---|---|---|---|---|---|---|---|---|---|---|---|
| 1 | PS Tasbi | 8 | 8 | 0 | 0 | 37 | 4 | +33 | 24 | Advances to National round | | | | | | | | | |
| 2 | Medan Soccer | 8 | 7 | 0 | 1 | 30 | 9 | +21 | 21 | | | | | | | | | | |
| 3 | Kurnia Medan City | 8 | 5 | 2 | 1 | 33 | 16 | +17 | 17 | | | | | | | | | | |
| 4 | PS Kwarta | 8 | 5 | 0 | 3 | 19 | 5 | +14 | 15 | | | | | | | | | | |
| 5 | PS Gumarang | 7 | 4 | 1 | 2 | 25 | 10 | +15 | 13 | | | | | | | | | | |
| 6 | Patriot Medan | 8 | 3 | 4 | 1 | 14 | 21 | −7 | 13 | | | | | | | | | | |
| 7 | PS PTPN III Medan | 8 | 2 | 2 | 4 | 15 | 26 | −11 | 8 | | | | | | | | | | |
| 8 | PSKB Binjai | 8 | 0 | 1 | 7 | 8 | 31 | −23 | 1 | | | | | | | | | | |
| 9 | PSL Langkat | 8 | 0 | 0 | 8 | 1 | 49 | −48 | 0 | | | | | | | | | | |

Updated to match(es) played on 13 April 2014. Source:
Legend: Blue = home team win; Yellow = draw; Red = away team win.
Rules for classification: 1) points; 2) goal difference; 3) number of goals scored.

=== Group B ===
| Pos | Team | Pld | W | D | L | GF | GA | GD | Pts | Qualification | PSKTS | BST | SBG | BTM | ATG | TMTA | RPB | MCP |
|---|---|---|---|---|---|---|---|---|---|---|---|---|---|---|---|---|---|---|
| 1 | PSKTS Tebingtinggi | 0 | 0 | 0 | 0 | 0 | 0 | 0 | 0 | Advances to National round | | | | | | | | |
| 2 | Bina Satria | 0 | 0 | 0 | 0 | 0 | 0 | 0 | 0 | | | | | | | | | |
| 3 | PS Serdang Bedagai | 0 | 0 | 0 | 0 | 0 | 0 | 0 | 0 | | | | | | | | | |
| 4 | Bina Taruna Mencirim | 0 | 0 | 0 | 0 | 0 | 0 | 0 | 0 | | | | | | | | | |
| 5 | PS Agtagana | 0 | 0 | 0 | 0 | 0 | 0 | 0 | 0 | | | | | | | | | |
| 6 | PS Tri Mantra | 0 | 0 | 0 | 0 | 0 | 0 | 0 | 0 | | | | | | | | | |
| 7 | Rafel Perbaungan | 0 | 0 | 0 | 0 | 0 | 0 | 0 | 0 | | | | | | | | | |
| 8 | PS Mencirim Putra | 0 | 0 | 0 | 0 | 0 | 0 | 0 | 0 | | | | | | | | | |

Updated to match(es) played on 13 April 2014. Source:
Legend: Blue = home team win; Yellow = draw; Red = away team win.
Rules for classification: 1) points; 2) goal difference; 3) number of goals scored.

=== Group C ===
| Pos | Team | Pld | W | D | L | GF | GA | GD | Pts | Qualification | PSSK | SIAN | SIMA | MTAS | BKRA | BTBR | STAS |
|---|---|---|---|---|---|---|---|---|---|---|---|---|---|---|---|---|---|
| 1 | PSSK Karo | 0 | 0 | 0 | 0 | 0 | 0 | 0 | 0 | Advances to National round | | | | | | | |
| 2 | Persesi Siantar | 0 | 0 | 0 | 0 | 0 | 0 | 0 | 0 | | | | | | | | |
| 3 | PSS Simalungun | 0 | 0 | 0 | 0 | 0 | 0 | 0 | 0 | | | | | | | | |
| 4 | Mitra Asahan | 0 | 0 | 0 | 0 | 0 | 0 | 0 | 0 | | | | | | | | |
| 5 | Bakri Asahan | 0 | 0 | 0 | 0 | 0 | 0 | 0 | 0 | | | | | | | | |
| 6 | PS Batubara | 0 | 0 | 0 | 0 | 0 | 0 | 0 | 0 | | | | | | | | |
| 7 | Perstas Batubara | 0 | 0 | 0 | 0 | 0 | 0 | 0 | 0 | | | | | | | | |

Updated to match(es) played on 13 April 2014. Source:
Legend: Blue = home team win; Yellow = draw; Red = away team win.
Rules for classification: 1) points; 2) goal difference; 3) number of goals scored.

=== Group D ===
| Pos | Team | Pld | W | D | L | GF | GA | GD | Pts | Qualification | SETU | HHAS | BASA | SAMS | SBBR | VCTD | SDKL | PKBH |
|---|---|---|---|---|---|---|---|---|---|---|---|---|---|---|---|---|---|---|
| 1 | Perstu North Tapanuli | 0 | 0 | 0 | 0 | 0 | 0 | 0 | 0 | Advances to National round | | | | | | | | |
| 2 | PS Humbahas | 0 | 0 | 0 | 0 | 0 | 0 | 0 | 0 | | | | | | | | | |
| 3 | Perstobasa Toba Samosir | 0 | 0 | 0 | 0 | 0 | 0 | 0 | 0 | | | | | | | | | |
| 4 | PS Samosir | 0 | 0 | 0 | 0 | 0 | 0 | 0 | 0 | | | | | | | | | |
| 5 | PS Siborongborong | 0 | 0 | 0 | 0 | 0 | 0 | 0 | 0 | | | | | | | | | |
| 6 | Victory Dairi | 0 | 0 | 0 | 0 | 0 | 0 | 0 | 0 | | | | | | | | | |
| 7 | Sidikalang | 0 | 0 | 0 | 0 | 0 | 0 | 0 | 0 | | | | | | | | | |
| 8 | PS Pakpak Bharat | 0 | 0 | 0 | 0 | 0 | 0 | 0 | 0 | | | | | | | | | |

Updated to match(es) played on 13 April 2014. Source:
Legend: Blue = home team win; Yellow = draw; Red = away team win.
Rules for classification: 1) points; 2) goal difference; 3) number of goals scored.

=== Group E ===
| Pos | Team | Pld | W | D | L | GF | GA | GD | Pts | Qualification | PSKPS | PTAS | TAPS | MMN | PPLU | PSPL | SBSI | PSTT | NIAS |
|---|---|---|---|---|---|---|---|---|---|---|---|---|---|---|---|---|---|---|---|
| 1 | PSKPS Padang Sidempuan | 0 | 0 | 0 | 0 | 0 | 0 | 0 | 0 | Advances to National round | | | | | | | | | |
| 2 | Persitas South Tapanuli | 0 | 0 | 0 | 0 | 0 | 0 | 0 | 0 | | | | | | | | | | |
| 3 | PS Tapsel | 0 | 0 | 0 | 0 | 0 | 0 | 0 | 0 | | | | | | | | | | |
| 4 | PS Madina Jaya | 0 | 0 | 0 | 0 | 0 | 0 | 0 | 0 | | | | | | | | | | |
| 5 | PS Paluta | 0 | 0 | 0 | 0 | 0 | 0 | 0 | 0 | | | | | | | | | | |
| 6 | PS Palas | 0 | 0 | 0 | 0 | 0 | 0 | 0 | 0 | | | | | | | | | | |
| 7 | Persebsi Sibolga | 0 | 0 | 0 | 0 | 0 | 0 | 0 | 0 | | | | | | | | | | |
| 8 | PSTT Central Tapanuli | 0 | 0 | 0 | 0 | 0 | 0 | 0 | 0 | | | | | | | | | | |
| 9 | PSN Nias | 0 | 0 | 0 | 0 | 0 | 0 | 0 | 0 | | | | | | | | | | |

Updated to match(es) played on 13 April 2014. Source:
Legend: Blue = home team win; Yellow = draw; Red = away team win.
Rules for classification: 1) points; 2) goal difference; 3) number of goals scored.
