= Mataram Utama Manggala F.C. =

Indonesian football club

Mataram Utama Manggala
- Full name: Mataram Utama Manggala Football Club
- Short name: MUMFC
- Founded: 30 May 2022; 4 years ago
- Ground: Dwi Windu Stadium
- Capacity: 15,000
- Owner: PT. Mataram Utama Perkasa
- Manager: Janu Riyanto
- Coach: Odie Gama Ardianyah
- League: Liga 4
- 2025–26: 1st (Special Region of Yogyakarta zone); First round, 4th in Group H (National phase)
- Website: mataramutama.com
Home colours	Away colours

Mataram Utama Manggala Football Club (previously known as Mataram Utama Football Club) is an Indonesian football team based in Yogyakarta, Special Region of Yogyakarta. They currently compete in Liga 4.

== History ==
Mataram Utama was established by PT Mataram Utama Perkasa on 27 June 2021, Mataram Utama was officially introduced as a new member of the Football Association of Indonesia in Yogyakarta, Manggala SIWO Mataram Utama, appointed Erwan Hendarwanto as head coach. This club is managed by a sports journalist in Special Region of Yogyakarta. Some of the players work as journalists such as FX Harminanto, former student national team and captain of PSIM Yogyakarta. Mataram Utama will appear in the competition which will take place in Yogyakarta and participate in Liga 3. The mission is to provide coaching for young and early age players through the Mataram Utama Football Academy. The emergence of Mataram Utama is also a sign of the development of football in Special Region of Yogyakarta which has attracted the attention of many parties.

On 15 November 2021, Mataram Utama made league match debut in a 3–2 win against Persig Gunungkidul at the Dwi Windu Stadium, in the next match, Mataram Utama will face a team with a big name, Persiba Bantul. Five days later, in that match, they had their second match in a 0–0 draw against Persiba Bantul. On 22 December 2021, 2021 Liga 3 Special Region of Yogyakarta has been held and Mataram Utama has become the champion to represent the province at the national level after they won 3–1 over Sleman United in the final at the Tridadi Stadium.

On 7 February 2022, in the national round match, they managed to get their first win after a 2–0 win over Citeureup Raya at the Galuh Stadium, Ciamis Regency. three days later, they had their second match in a 6–0 big win against Persisam United. On 13 February 2022, they closed the match in the group stage round of 64 in a 2–2 draw against PS Sandeq, with this result, they qualified for the second round as winners Group F. Mataram Utama won their first two matches in the round of 32 to make them qualify for the round of 16, in the first match on 16 February, Mataram Utama won 3–1 over Gasko Kolaka and won 2–1 over Persak Kebumen three days later. On 7 March 2022, in the Round of 16, Mataram Utama drew 1–1 against PSGC Ciamis at the Gelora Delta Stadium, Sidoarjo in the first match.

On 13 March 2022, Mataram Utama officially promoted to Liga 2 next season for the first time in the club's history and also at the same time qualified for the semi-finals of 2021–22 Liga 3 after in the last match of Group DD won 4–1 over Persidago Gorontalo. But during the semi-finals, they suffered a 6–1 defeat to Putra Delta Sidoarjo, and fail to final match.

On 30 May 2022, during the 2022 PSSI Ordinary Congress, the club handed over their senior team to a group of investors, who subsequently changed their name to Nusantara United Football Club. Mataram Utama as a club still exists, however they now shift their attention towards only youth development and their football academy, with the club seemingly refraining from fielding another senior team for the 2022–23 season.

For the 2022–23 Liga 3 season, Mataram Utama have re-enrolled themselves into the 2022 Liga 3 Special Region of Yogyakarta, now playing under the name Mataram Utama Manggala Football Club.

== Coaching staff ==
Position	Name
Manager	(Indonesia) Janu Riyanto
Head coach	(Indonesia) Erwin Hendarwanto
Assistant coach	(Indonesia) Ony Kurniawan
Assistant coach	(Indonesia) Arif Fitriadi
U10 Coach	(Indonesia) M Guno Pangaribowo (Indonesia) Angga Setiawan
U12 Coach	(Indonesia) Tony Yuliandri
U13 Coach	(Indonesia) Odi Gama
U15 Coach	(Indonesia) Pratama Gilang
U17 Coach	(Indonesia) Johan Arga

== Players ==
=== Current squad ===
As of 31 August 2021

Note: Flags indicate national team as defined under FIFA eligibility rules; some limited exceptions apply. Players may hold more than one non-FIFA nationality.

No.	Pos.	Nation	Player
1	GK	IDN	Deny Pangestu
2	MF	IDN	Dimas Saputra
3	MF	IDN	Angga Setyawan
4	DF	IDN	Raymond Fernando
5	DF	IDN	Ruben Alexander
6	DF	IDN	Nico Chandra Sinurat
7	MF	IDN	Angga Wahyu Setyawan
8	MF	IDN	Aruna Brama Siwi
9	FW	IDN	Muhamad Hamam Rifki
10	FW	IDN	Muhamad Sarjono
11	MF	IDN	Bagus Khairil Anwar
12	DF	IDN	Idris Mualif
13	FW	IDN	Muhamad Fiki Aditya
14	DF	IDN	Iswan Gafur

No.	Pos.	Nation	Player
15	FW	IDN	Jaya Dwi Anggara
16	MF	IDN	Harry Kusuma (captain)
17	MF	IDN	Novian Ardiyanto
18	DF	IDN	Veri Bagus Istiawan
19	FW	IDN	Martua Sandeni
24	DF	IDN	Widi Aryanto
25	FW	IDN	Indra Hariyadi
26	DF	IDN	Sandi Kurniawan
27	DF	IDN	Bayu Agus Setyawan
29	DF	IDN	Rivaldo Sihombing
41	DF	IDN	Ferdian Nur Santoso
47	GK	IDN	Ramadhan Akhsan
98	GK	IDN	Rupeka Firlian

== Season-by-season records ==
Season	League/Division	Tms.	Pos.	Piala Indonesia
as Mataram Utama
2021–22	Liga 3	64	semi-finalist	—
as Mataram Utama Manggala
2022–23	Liga 3	season abandoned		—
2023–24	Liga 3	80	eliminated in provincial phase	—
2024–25	Liga 4	64	eliminated in provincial phase	—
2025–26	Liga 4	64	4th in Group H, first round	—

== Honours ==
- Liga 3 Yogyakarta
  - Champion (1): 2021
- Liga 4 Yogyakarta
  - Champion (1): 2025–26
