= 2024–25 Liga 4 Special Region of Yogyakarta =

Liga 4 Special Region of Yogyakarta
- Season: 2024–25
- Dates: 13 January – 23 February 2025
- Champions: PS HW UMY (1st title)
- National phase: PS HW UMY
- Matches: 22
- Goals: 70 (3.18 per match)
- Biggest win: Gukiti 1–6 Mataram Utama Manggala (5 February 2025)
- Highest scoring: Gukiti 1–6 Mataram Utama Manggala (5 February 2025)

The 2024–25 Liga 4 Special Region of Yogyakarta was the inaugural season of Liga 4 Special Region of Yogyakarta after the structural changes of Indonesian football competition and serves as a qualifying round for the national phase of the 2024–25 Liga 4. The competition is organised by the Special Region of Yogyakarta Provincial PSSI Association.

== Teams ==
=== Teams changes ===
The following teams changed division after the 2023–24 season.

▲ Qualified for Liga Nusantara
- Persiba Bantul

=== Participating teams ===
A total of 7 teams are competing in this season.

| No | Team | Location | 2023 season |
|---|---|---|---|
| 1 | Duta Pro Bina Taruna | Bantul Regency | Semi-finalist |
| 2 | JK United | Bantul Regency | First round (3rd in Group B) |
| 3 | PS HW UMY | Bantul Regency | Runner-up |
| 4 | Mataram Utama Manggala | Yogyakarta City | First round (4th in Group A) |
| 5 | Tunas Jogja | Yogyakarta City | — |
| 6 | UAD | Yogyakarta City | First round (3rd in Group A) |
| 7 | Gukiti | Gunungkidul Regency | — |

=== Personnel and kits ===
Note: Flags indicate national team as has been defined under FIFA eligibility rules. Players and coaches may hold more than one non-FIFA nationality.

| Team | Head coach | Captain | Kit manufacturer | Main kit sponsor | Other kit sponsor(s) |
|---|---|---|---|---|---|
| Duta Pro Bina Taruna | | | (Indonesia) McCloth | McCloth | List: Front: None; Back: None; Sleeves: None; Shorts:None |
| Gukiti | | | (Indonesia) ALB Apparel | CMR Utama | List: Front: Deepublish; Back: None; Sleeves: None; Shorts: None |
| JK United | | | (Indonesia) Ayres | JK United | List: Front: SakaTembi; Back: Sleeves: Shorts: |
| Mataram Utama Manggala | | | (Indonesia) Maxtive | None | List: Front: None; Back: None; Sleeves: None; Shorts: None |
| PS HW UMY | (Indonesia) Nopendi | | (Indonesia) Buntar Apparel | BRImo | List: Front: PT Sinergi Visi Utama Consultant; Back: Universitas Muhammadiyah Yogyakarta, Buntar Apparel; Sleeves: HumaProperti, Sandang Sport Jogja; Shorts: None |
| Tunas Jogja | | | | Nusakita | List: Front: Back: Sleeves: Shorts: |
| UAD | | | (Indonesia) BolaUAD^{1} | Universitas Ahmad Dahlan | List: Front: None; Back: None; Sleeves: None; Shorts: None |

Notes:

1. Apparel made by club.

== Schedule ==
The schedule of the competition is as follows.

| Round | Matchday | Date |
|---|---|---|
| Regular round | Matchday 1 | 13 January 2025 |
| Regular round | Matchday 2 | 17 January 2025 |
| Regular round | Matchday 3 | 22 January 2025 |
| Regular round | Matchday 4 | 29 January 2025 |
| Regular round | Matchday 5 | 5 February 2025 |
| Regular round | Matchday 6 | 12 February 2025 |
| Regular round | Matchday 7 | 19 February 2025 |
| Final | | 23 February 2025 |

== Regular round ==
The regular round contains 7 teams that will play in a single round-robin format. The winner and runner-up will be advance to the final.

All matches will be held at Dwi Windu Stadium in Bantul, Banyuraden Field and Nogotirto Field in Sleman.

| Pos | Team | Pld | W | D | L | GF | GA | GD | Pts | Qualification | BIN | UMY | JKU | MUM | UAD | TNS | GKT |
|---|---|---|---|---|---|---|---|---|---|---|---|---|---|---|---|---|---|
| 1 | Duta Pro Bina Taruna | 6 | 5 | 0 | 1 | 11 | 6 | +5 | 15 | Qualification to the Final | — | 2–1 | 2–0 | — | — | 2–0 | — |
| 2 | PS HW UMY | 6 | 4 | 1 | 1 | 15 | 7 | +8 | 13 | Qualification to the Final | — | — | 3–3 | — | — | 3–0 | 3–0 |
| 3 | JK United | 6 | 3 | 2 | 1 | 12 | 8 | +4 | 11 | | — | — | — | 1–1 | 2–1 | — | 4–0 |
| 4 | Mataram Utama Manggala | 6 | 3 | 1 | 2 | 15 | 9 | +6 | 10 | | 4–1 | 2–3 | — | — | 0–2 | — | — |
| 5 | UAD | 6 | 3 | 0 | 3 | 6 | 6 | 0 | 9 | | 0–1 | 0–2 | — | — | — | 2–1 | — |
| 6 | Tunas Jogja | 6 | 1 | 0 | 5 | 7 | 13 | −6 | 3 | | — | — | 1–2 | 1–2 | — | — | 4–2 |
| 7 | Gukiti | 6 | 0 | 0 | 6 | 4 | 21 | −17 | 0 | | 1–3 | — | — | 1–6 | 0–1 | — | — |

Source: Liga 4 Special Region of Yogyakarta
Rules for classification: 1) Points; 2) Head-to-head points; 3) Head-to-head goal difference; 4) Head-to-head goals scored; 5) Goal difference; 6) Goals scored; 7) Fair-play points; 8) Draw.

=== Matches ===
Matchday 1 (13 January 2025)
13 January 2025
15:00 WIB (UTC+7)

| UAD | 2–1 | Tunas Jogja |

Dwi Windu Stadium, Bantul
13 January 2025
15:00 WIB (UTC+7)

| Mataram Utama Manggala | 2–3 | PS HW UMY |

Banyuraden Field, Sleman
13 January 2025
15:00 WIB (UTC+7)

| Gukiti | 1–3 | Duta Pro Bina Taruna |

Nogotirto Field, Sleman

Matchday 2 (17 January 2025)
17 January 2025
15:00 WIB (UTC+7)

| JK United | 1–1 | Mataram Utama Manggala |
|---|---|---|
| | Report |

Dwi Windu Stadium, Bantul
17 January 2025
15:00 WIB (UTC+7)

| Gukiti | 0–1 | UAD |
|---|---|---|
| | Report |

Banyuraden Field, Sleman
17 January 2025
15:00 WIB (UTC+7)

| Duta Pro Bina Taruna | 2–1 | PS HW UMY |
|---|---|---|
| | Report |

Nogotirto Field, Sleman

Matchday 3 (22 January 2025)
22 January 2025
15:00 WIB (UTC+7)

| PS HW UMY | 3–0 | Gukiti |
|---|---|---|
| | Report |

Dwi Windu Stadium, Bantul
22 January 2025
15:00 WIB (UTC+7)

| Duta Pro Bina Taruna | 2–0 | JK United |
|---|---|---|
| | Report |

Banyuraden Field, Sleman
22 January 2025
15:00 WIB (UTC+7)

| Tunas Jogja | 1–2 | Mataram Utama Manggala |
|---|---|---|
| | Report |

Nogotirto Field, Sleman

Matchday 4 (29 January 2025)
29 January 2025
15:00 WIB (UTC+7)

| Mataram Utama Manggala | 4–1 | Duta Pro Bina Taruna |
|---|---|---|
| | Report |

Dwi Windu Stadium, Bantul
29 January 2025
15:00 WIB (UTC+7)

| UAD | 0–2 | PS HW UMY |
|---|---|---|
| | Report |

Banyuraden Field, Sleman
29 January 2025
15:00 WIB (UTC+7)

| Tunas Jogja | 1–2 | JK United |
|---|---|---|
| | Report |

Nogotirto Field, Sleman

Matchday 5 (5 February 2025)
5 February 2025
15:00 WIB (UTC+7)

| PS HW UMY | 3–0 | Tunas Jogja |
|---|---|---|
| | Report |

Dwi Windu Stadium, Bantul
5 February 2025
15:00 WIB (UTC+7)

| Gukiti | 1–6 | Mataram Utama Manggala |
|---|---|---|
| | Report |

Banyuraden Field, Sleman
5 February 2025
15:00 WIB (UTC+7)

| JK United | 2–1 | UAD |
|---|---|---|
| | Report |

Nogotirto Field, Sleman

Matchday 6 (12 February 2025)
12 February 2025
15:00 WIB (UTC+7)

| JK United | 4–0 | Gukiti |
|---|---|---|
| | Report |

Dwi Windu Stadium, Bantul
12 February 2025
15:00 WIB (UTC+7)

| Duta Pro Bina Taruna | 2–0 | Tunas Jogja |
|---|---|---|
| | Report |

Banyuraden Field, Sleman
12 February 2025
15:00 WIB (UTC+7)

| Mataram Utama Manggala | 0–2 | UAD |
|---|---|---|
| | Report |

Nogotirto Field, Sleman

Matchday 7 (19 February 2025)
19 February 2025
15:00 WIB (UTC+7)

| UAD | 0–1 | Duta Pro Bina Taruna |
|---|---|---|
| | Report |

Dwi Windu Stadium, Bantul
19 February 2025
15:00 WIB (UTC+7)

| PS HW UMY | 3–3 | JK United |
|---|---|---|
| | Report |

Banyuraden Field, Sleman
19 February 2025
15:00 WIB (UTC+7)

| Tunas Jogja | 4–2 | Gukiti |
|---|---|---|
| | Report |

Nogotirto Field, Sleman

== Final ==
The final will be played as a single match. If tied after regulation time, extra time and, if necessary, a penalty shoot-out will be used to decide the winning team.

23 February 2025
15:00 WIB (UTC+7)

| Duta Pro Bina Taruna | 0–1 | PS HW UMY |
|---|---|---|
| | Report |

Sultan Agung Stadium, Bantul

== See also ==
- 2024–25 Liga 4
