= 2023 Liga 3 Special Region of Yogyakarta =

Tournament details
- Country: Indonesia
- Venue: 2
- Dates: 13 November – 26 December 2023
- Teams: 11

Final positions
- Champions: Persiba Bantul (1st title)
- Runners-up: PS HW UMY
- Qualified to: National phase

Tournament statistics
- Matches played: 28
- Goals scored: 82 (2.93 per match)

The 2023 Liga 3 Special Region of Yogyakarta will be the sixth season of Liga 3 Special Region of Yogyakarta as a qualifying round for the national phase of the 2023–24 Liga 3.

Mataram Utama were the defending champion. They were promoted to the 2022–23 Liga 2 following the conclusion of last season's national round, however they relinquished their Liga 2 spot to Nusantara United.

== Teams ==
There are 11 teams participated in the league this season.

No.	Team	Location
1	JK Tamanan United	Bantul Regency
2	Persiba Bantul	Bantul Regency
3	PS HW UMY	Bantul Regency
4	Bantul United	Bantul Regency
5	Duta Pro Bina Taruna	Bantul Regency
6	Raga Putra Menoreh	Kulon Progo Regency
7	Mataram Utama Manggala	Yogyakarta City
8	PS Tunas Ngaglik	Yogyakarta City
9	Jogja Istimewa Football	Yogyakarta City
10	UAD	Yogyakarta City
11	UNY	Yogyakarta City

== Venues ==
- Dwi Windu Stadium, Bantul Regency
- Sultan Agung Stadium, Bantul Regency

== Group stage ==
=== Group A ===
Pos	Team	Pld	W	D	L	GF	GA	GD	Pts	Qualification
1	PS HW UMY	4	2	1	1	3	2	+1	7 (Note: Head-to-head result: PS HW UMY 2–1 Bantul United.)	Advance to the Knockout Stage
2	Bantul United (H)	4	2	1	1	8	4	+4	7	Advance to the Knockout Stage
3	UAD	4	2	0	2	3	5	−2	6	
4	Mataram Utama Manggala	4	1	2	1	6	5	+1	5	
5	PS Tunas Ngaglik	4	0	2	2	5	9	−4	2	

Source: Liga 3 DIY 2023
(H) Hosts
Notes:
13 November 2023
15.15 WIB

PS HW UMY	1–0	Mataram Utama Manggala
	Report

Dwi Windu Stadium, Bantul Regency
15 November 2023
15.15 WIB

UAD	2–1	PS Tunas Ngaglik
	Report

Dwi Windu Stadium, Bantul Regency

20 November 2023
15.15 WIB

PS Tunas Ngaglik	1–4	Bantul United
	Report

Dwi Windu Stadium, Bantul Regency
22 November 2023
15.15 WIB

UAD	1–0	PS HW UMY
	Report

Dwi Windu Stadium, Bantul Regency

27 November 2023
15.15 WIB

Bantul United	2–0	UAD
	Report

Dwi Windu Stadium, Bantul Regency
29 November 2023
15.15 WIB

Mataram Utama Manggala	3–3	PS Tunas Ngaglik
	Report

Dwi Windu Stadium, Bantul Regency

4 December 2023
15.15 WIB

Mataram Utama Manggala	2–0	UAD
	Report

Dwi Windu Stadium, Bantul Regency
8 December 2023
15.15 WIB

PS HW UMY	2−1	Bantul United
	Report

Dwi Windu Stadium, Bantul Regency

11 December 2023
15.15 WIB

PS Tunas Ngaglik	0−0	PS HW UMY
	Report

Dwi Windu Stadium, Bantul Regency
13 December 2023
15.15 WIB

Bantul United	1−1	Mataram Utama Manggala
	Report

Dwi Windu Stadium, Bantul Regency

=== Group B ===
Pos	Team	Pld	W	D	L	GF	GA	GD	Pts	Qualification
1	Persiba Bantul (H)	5	4	0	1	11	2	+9	12	Advance to the Knockout Stage
2	Duta Pro Bina Taruna	5	3	1	1	10	5	+5	10	Advance to the Knockout Stage
3	JK Tamanan United	5	3	0	2	10	4	+6	9	
4	UNY	5	2	0	3	8	11	−3	6	
5	Raga Putra Menoreh	5	1	2	2	5	7	−2	5	
6	Jogja Istimewa Football	5	0	1	4	3	18	−15	1	

Source: Liga 3 DIY 2023
(H) Hosts
14 November 2023
15.15 WIB

JK Tamanan United	1–2	UNY
	Report

Sultan Agung Stadium, Bantul Regency
16 November 2023
15.15 WIB

Jogja Istimewa Football	1–1	Raga Putra Menoreh
	Report

Sultan Agung Stadium, Bantul Regency
18 November 2023
15.15 WIB

Duta Pro Bina Taruna	0–3	Persiba Bantul
	Report

Sultan Agung Stadium, Bantul Regency

21 November 2023
15.15 WIB

Duta Pro Bina Taruna	1–1	Raga Putra Menoreh
	Report

Sultan Agung Stadium, Bantul Regency
23 November 2023
15.15 WIB

JK Tamanan United	5–0	Jogja Istimewa Football
	Report

Sultan Agung Stadium, Bantul Regency
26 November 2023
15.15 WIB

Persiba Bantul	2–0	UNY
	Report

Sultan Agung Stadium, Bantul Regency

28 November 2023
15.15 WIB

Raga Putra Menoreh	0–2	JK Tamanan United
	Report

Sultan Agung Stadium, Bantul Regency
30 November 2023
15.15 WIB

UNY	1–3	Duta Pro Bina Taruna
	Report

Sultan Agung Stadium, Bantul Regency
2 December 2023
15.15 WIB

Persiba Bantul	3–0	Jogja Istimewa Football
	Report

Sultan Agung Stadium, Bantul Regency

5 December 2023
15.15 WIB

JK Tamanan United	0−1	Duta Pro Bina Taruna
	Report

Sultan Agung Stadium, Bantul Regency
7 December 2023
15.15 WIB

Jogja Istimewa Football	2–4	UNY
	Report

Sultan Agung Stadium, Bantul Regency
9 December 2023
15.15 WIB

Raga Putra Menoreh	0–2	Persiba Bantul
	Report

Sultan Agung Stadium, Bantul Regency

12 December 2023
15.15 WIB

UNY	1–3	Raga Putra Menoreh
	Report

Sultan Agung Stadium, Bantul Regency
14 December 2023
15.15 WIB

Duta Pro Bina Taruna	5–0	Jogja Istimewa Football
	Report

Sultan Agung Stadium, Bantul Regency
17 December 2023
15.15 WIB

Persiba Bantul	1–2	JK Tamanan United
	Report

Sultan Agung Stadium, Bantul Regency

== Knockout stage ==
=== Bracket ===
Semi-finals
19 December 2023 – Bantul Regency
A1	PS HW UMY (p)	2 (3)
B2	Duta Pro Bina Taruna	2 (2)
20 December 2023 – Bantul Regency
B1	Persiba Bantul	1
A2	Bantul United	0

Final
26 December 2023 – Bantul Regency
PS HW UMY	4 (3)
Persiba Bantul (p)	4 (4)

=== Semi-finals ===
19 December 2023
15.00 WIB

PS HW UMY	2–2 (a.e.t.)	Duta Pro Bina Taruna
	Report
Penalties
	3–2

Sultan Agung Stadium, Bantul Regency

20 December 2023
15.00 WIB

Persiba Bantul	1–0	Bantul United
	Report

Sultan Agung Stadium, Bantul Regency

=== Final ===
26 December 2023
14.30 WIB

PS HW UMY	4–4 (a.e.t.)	Persiba Bantul
	Report
Penalties
	3–4

Sultan Agung Stadium, Bantul Regency

== Qualification to the national phase ==
Team	Method of qualification	Date of qualification	Qualified to
Persiba Bantul	Champions of 2023 Liga 3 Special Region of Yogyakarta	26 December 2023	2023–24 Liga 3 National Phase
PS HW UMY	Runner-up of 2023 Liga 3 Special Region of Yogyakarta	26 December 2023	2023–24 Liga 3 National Phase

== See also ==
- 2023–24 Liga 3 National phase
