= 2021 Liga 3 Special Region of Yogyakarta =

Tournament details
- Dates: 14 November–21 December 2021
- Teams: 15

Final positions
- Champions: Mataram Utama
- Runners-up: Sleman United

The 2021 Liga 3 Special Region of Yogyakarta (also known as Liga 3 MS Glow For Men PSSI Yogyakarta for sponsorship reason) was the fourth season of Liga 3 Special Region of Yogyakarta as a qualifying round for the national round of the 2021–22 Liga 3.

Sleman United were the defending champion.

== Teams ==
The league consisted of fifteen teams.

Team	Location
Bina Taruna	Bantul
Gama	Yogyakarta
JK United	Bantul
Mataram Utama	Yogyakarta
Persiba Bantul	Bantul
Persig Gunungkidul	Gunungkidul
Persikup Kulon Progo	Kulon Progo
PS Baturetno	Bantul
PS HW UMY	Bantul
PS Tunas Jogja	Yogyakarta
PSTN Sleman	Sleman
Raga Putra Menoreh	Kulon Progo
Rajawali Gunungkidul	Gunungkidul
Satria Adikarta	Kulon Progo
Sleman United	Sleman

== First round ==
=== Group A ===
All matches were held at the Dwi Windu Stadium, Bantul Regency.

Pos	Team	Pld	W	D	L	GF	GA	GD	Pts	Qualification
1	Persig	4	3	0	1	7	4	+3	9	Qualified
2	Mataram Utama	4	2	2	0	5	3	+2	8	Qualified
3	Persiba (H)	4	2	1	1	4	1	+3	7	
4	JK United	4	1	1	2	4	5	−1	4	
5	PS HW UMY	4	0	0	4	1	8	−7	0	

Source: 2021 Liga 3 DI Yogyakarta
(H) Hosts

=== Group B ===
All matches were held at the Kridosono Stadium, Yogyakarta.

Pos	Team	Pld	W	D	L	GF	GA	GD	Pts	Qualification
1	Raga Putra Menoreh	4	3	1	0	8	2	+6	10	Qualified
2	Satria Adikarta	4	3	0	1	5	2	+3	9	Qualified
3	PS Tunas Jogja (H)	4	2	1	1	6	2	+4	7	
4	PS Baturetno	4	1	0	3	8	7	+1	3	
5	Rajawali Gunungkidul	4	0	0	4	0	14	−14	0	

Source: 2021 Liga 3 DI Yogyakarta
(H) Hosts

=== Group C ===
All matches were held at the Tridadi Stadium, Sleman Regency.

Pos	Team	Pld	W	D	L	GF	GA	GD	Pts	Qualification
1	Sleman United (H)	4	3	0	1	10	3	+7	9	Qualified
2	Bina Taruna	4	3	0	1	9	4	+5	9	Qualified
3	PSTN Sleman	4	3	0	1	7	6	+1	9	
4	Persikup	4	1	0	3	5	6	−1	3	
5	Gama	4	0	0	4	0	12	−12	0	

Source: 2021 Liga 3 DI Yogyakarta
(H) Hosts

== Second round ==
=== Group X ===
All matches were held at the Kridosono Stadium, Yogyakarta.

Pos	Team	Pld	W	D	L	GF	GA	GD	Pts	Qualification
1	Sleman United	2	2	0	0	3	1	+2	6	Qualified
2	Satria Adikarta	2	1	0	1	2	2	0	3	Qualified
3	Persig	2	0	0	2	0	2	−2	0	

Source: 2021 Liga 3 DI Yogyakarta

=== Group Y ===
All matches were held at the Dwi Windu Stadium, Bantul Regency.

Pos	Team	Pld	W	D	L	GF	GA	GD	Pts	Qualification
1	Mataram Utama	2	1	1	0	4	2	+2	4	Qualified
2	Bina Taruna	2	1	0	1	1	2	−1	3	Qualified
3	Raga Putra Menoreh	2	0	1	1	2	3	−1	1	

Source: 2021 Liga 3 DI Yogyakarta

== Knockout stage ==
Semifinals
X1	Sleman United	1
Y2	Bina Taruna	0
Y1	Mataram Utama	3
X2	Satria Adikarta	0

Finals
X1	Sleman United	1
Y1	Mataram Utama	3

=== Semifinals ===
December 19, 2021
14:30 UTC+7

Sleman United	1–0	Bina Taruna

December 20, 2021
14:30 UTC+7

Mataram Utama	3–0	Satria Adikarta

=== Finals ===
December 21, 2021
14:30 UTC+7

Sleman United	1–3	Mataram Utama

Mandala Krida Stadium, Yogyakarta
