= 2014 Liga Nusantara South Kalimantan =

Liga Nusantara Central Kalimantan
- Season: 2014

The 2014 Liga Nusantara Central Kalimantan season is the first edition of Liga Nusantara Central Kalimantan is a qualifying round of the 2014 Liga Nusantara.

The competition scheduled starts in May 2014.

== Teams ==
This season there are probably 20 Central Kalimantan club participants.

== League table ==
Divided into 2 group of 10.
