= 2014 Liga Nusantara Papua =

Liga Nusantara Papua
- Season: 2014

The 2014 Liga Nusantara Papua season is the first edition of Liga Nusantara Papua is a qualifying round of the 2014 Liga Nusantara.

The competition scheduled starts on 5 May 2014.

== Teams ==
This season there are 23 Papua club participants.

== League table ==
Divided into four zones consisting of Merauke, Nabire, Jayapura and Wamena.
