= 2014 Liga Nusantara East Java =

Liga Nusantara East Java
- Season: 2014

The 2014 Liga Nusantara East Java season is the first edition of Liga Nusantara East Java is a qualifying round of the 2014 Liga Nusantara.

The competition scheduled starts on 25 May 2014.

== Teams ==
This season there are 37 East Java club participants, divided into 3 group of 9 and 1 group of 10.

== League table ==
Divided into 3 group of 9 and 1 group of 10, winner of each group qualify for the 2014 Liga Nusantara.
