= 2014 Liga Nusantara East Kalimantan =

Liga Nusantara East Kalimantan
- Season: 2014

The 2014 Liga Nusantara East Kalimantan season is the first edition of Liga Nusantara East Kalimantan is a qualifying round of the 2014 Liga Nusantara.

The competition scheduled starts in May 2014.

== Teams ==
This season there are probably 10 East Kalimantan club participants, 7 clubs played in third division last season.
