= 2014 Liga Nusantara Riau Islands =

Liga Nusantara Riau Islands
- Season: 2014

The 2014 Liga Nusantara Riau Islands season was the first edition of Liga Nusantara Riau Islands as a qualifying round of the 2014 Liga Nusantara. The competition started in May 2014.

== Teams ==
There were 9 to 10 Riau Islands club participants during the season.

Registered club last season in the Third Division competition was Erdeka Muda, PS Putra Kundur, YSK 757 Karimun, PS Kota Tanjungpinang, PSTS Tanjungpinang, PS Bintan, and Persedas Dabo Singkep, while those registered in the second division is PS Batam and PS Karimun.

== League table ==
Divided into one group, teams in the top places qualified for the 2014 Liga Nusantara.
