= 2014 Liga Nusantara Aceh =

Liga Nusantara Aceh
- Season: 2014

The 2014 Liga Nusantara Aceh season was the first edition of Liga Nusantara Aceh as a qualifying round of the 2014 Liga Nusantara. The scheduled started in May 2014.

== Teams ==
There were 23 Aceh club participants.
