= 2014 Liga Nusantara Riau =

Liga Nusantara Riau
- Season: 2014

The 2014 Liga Nusantara Riau season was the first edition of Liga Nusantara Riau as a qualifying round of the 2014 Liga Nusantara. The competition started in May 2014.

== Teams ==
The Provincial Association accepted clubs who wished to register from April 8 until April 15, 2014. Until 23 April 2014 as many as 10 clubs have declared their participation is PS PPLP Dispora Riau, PS SMA Olahraga, PS Kampar, Bina Bakat, PS Pekanbaru, Bintang Rokan Hilir, Indragiri, Nabil, Kuansing City, and Dumai

While the other three teams, namely PS Air Melok, PSSP Selat Panjang, and PSBS Bangkinang will still awaited confirmation finally.

=== Stadium and locations ===
Club	Regency/City	Stadium	Capacity	2013 season
Bina Bakat	Pekanbaru			Played in Third Division
Bintang Rokan Hilir	Rokan Hilir	Bagansiapiapi		Played in Third Division
Dumai	Dumai	Bukit Jin	10,000	new participants
Indragiri	Indragiri Hulu	Narasinga	5,000	Played in Third Division
Kuansing City	Kuansing	Kuansing Sport Centre	25,000	new participants
Nabil	Pekanbaru			Played in Third Division
PS PPLP Dispora Riau	Pekanbaru			Played in Third Division
PS Kampar	Kampar	Tuanku Tambusai	7,000	Played in Third Division
PS Pekanbaru	Pekanbaru			Played in Third Division
PS SMA Olahraga	Pekanbaru			Played in Third Division
