= 2014 Liga Nusantara Gorontalo =

Liga Nusantara Gorontalo
- Season: 2014

The 2014 Liga Nusantara Gorontalo season is the first edition of Liga Nusantara Gorontalo is a qualifying round of the 2014 Liga Nusantara.

The competition scheduled starts in May 2014.

== Teams ==
This season there are probably more than 10 Gorontalo club participants.

A total of 7 clubs have signed up as participants they are Persidago Gorontalo, PS Bone Bolango, PS Boalemo, PS Pohuwato, Gorontalo Selection, Boliyohuto F.C. and PS Bone Pesisir. While the two clubs again Panipi Raya F.C. and Gorontalo Barat F.C. was still awaiting confirmation.

== League table ==
Probably divided into one group, first places qualify for the 2014 Liga Nusantara.
