= 2014 Liga Nusantara North Maluku =

Liga Nusantara North Maluku
- Season: 2014

The 2014 Liga Nusantara North Maluku season is the first edition of Liga Nusantara North Maluku is a qualifying round of the 2014 Liga Nusantara.

The competition scheduled starts in May 2014.

== Teams ==
This season there are 14 North Maluku club participants.

== League table ==
Divided into one group.
