= 2014 Liga Nusantara South Sumatra =

Liga Nusantara South Sumatra
- Season: 2014

The 2014 Liga Nusantara South Sumatra also called 2014 South Sumatra Super League (SSL) season is the first edition of Liga Nusantara South Sumatra is a qualifying round of the 2014 Liga Nusantara.

The competition scheduled starts on 9 May 2014.

== Teams ==
This season there are 22 clubs in South Sumatra that pass the verification become participants from 28 clubs listed. They are Bina Sriwijaya, Maninjau F.C., Bintang Utara, Persegrata, Sriwijaya Press Community, Palembang All Star, Siring Agung F.C., Garuda SP Padang, Bank Mandiri Palembang, Bank Sumsel, Balit F.C., Pertamina Palembang, PS Pusri, PSM IAIN Raden Fatah, PS Mesuji, PS Lempuing, PS Manunggal, Akademi Sepakbola F.C., Mujahid United, SONS, Persekeb Kebun Bunga 09 and Petani F.C.

== League table ==
Probably divided into 2 group of 11.
