= 2014 Liga Nusantara South Sulawesi =

Liga Nusantara South Sulawesi
- Season: 2014

The 2014 Liga Nusantara South Sulawesi season is the first edition of Liga Nusantara South Sulawesi is a qualifying round of the 2014 Liga Nusantara.

The competition scheduled starts in May 2014.

== Teams ==
This season there are all registered South Sulawesi club participants.

== League table ==
Divided into one group.
