= 2014 Liga Nusantara Maluku =

Liga Nusantara Maluku
- Season: 2014
- Champions: Arrow

The 2014 Liga Nusantara Maluku season is the first edition of Liga Nusantara Maluku is a qualifying round of the 2014 Liga Nusantara.

The competition scheduled starts on 5 May 2014.

== Teams ==
This season there are 10 Maluku club participants, the ten teams that include Persinam Namlea, Persmi Masohi, PSHL Hitu Leitimur, Tulehu Putra, Ambon Putra, Arrow, Toisapu Laha, PS Lorihua, Persehi Hitu, and PSA Ambon.

== League table ==
Divided into one group of 10.

== Results ==
First leg play on May with 45 match and second leg play on August with 45 match.
