= 2014 Liga Nusantara North Sulawesi =

Liga Nusantara North Sulawesi
- Season: 2014
- Champions: Persmin Minahasa

The 2014 Liga Nusantara North Sulawesi season, also called North Sulawesi League, is the first edition of Liga Nusantara North Sulawesi is a qualifying round of the 2014 Liga Nusantara.

The competition scheduled starts in May 2014.

== Teams ==
This season all registered clubs in North Sulawesi participating.

== Result ==
Persmin Minahasa is the winner after won 2–1 against PSKT Tomohon in the final.
