= 2014 Liga Nusantara Jambi =

Liga Nusantara Jambi
- Season: 2014

The 2014 Liga Nusantara Jambi season was the first edition of Liga Nusantara Jambi as a qualifying round of the 2014 Liga Nusantara. The competition started in May 2014.

== Teams ==
This season 15 registered clubs and also some new clubs so as to achieve the target of at least 20 club participants in Jambi.
