= Edi Hafid =

Indonesian footballer (born 1983)

Edi Hafid Murtadho
Personal information
- Full name: Edi Hafid Murtado
- Date of birth: 21 March 1983 (age 43)
- Place of birth: Bandung, Indonesia
- Height: 1.75 m (5 ft 9 in)
- Position: Right back

Youth career
- Saint Prima

Senior career*
Years	Team	Apps	(Gls)
2003	Persigar Garut		
2004	Persitara Jakarta Utara		
2005–2010	Persib Bandung	18	(0)
2010–2014	Pelita Bandung Raya	71	(0)
2015–2016	Perssu 1977 Sumenep	7	(0)
2017	Persikabo Bogor	16	(0)
- * Club domestic league appearances and goals

Edi Hafid Murtado (born 21 March 1983) is an Indonesian former footballer.
