= Persigar Garut =

Indonesian football club

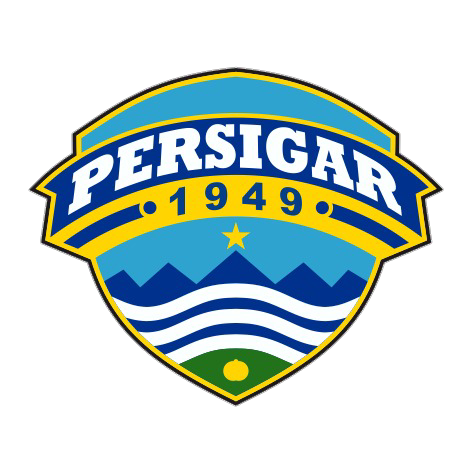
- Full name: Persatuan Sepakbola Indonesia Garut
- Nickname: Maung Sancang
- Founded: 28 September 1949; 77 years ago
- Ground: R.A.A. Adiwijaya Stadium; Garut, West Java
- Capacity: 12,000
- Owner: Garut Regency Government
- Chairman: Rudy Gunawan
- Head coach: Angga Permadi
- League: Liga 4
- 2024–25: 4th, Group C (West Java zone)
Home colours	Away colours

Persatuan Sepakbola Indonesia Garut (simply known as Persigar) is an Indonesian football club based in Garut, West Java. They currently compete in the Liga 4.

== History ==
Persigar was founded on 28 September 1949, originating from Garut. Based at Jayaraga Stadium, it has the nickname Maung Sancang. H. Daim Kusnadi was the force behind the success of Persigar at that time. Persigar was just one step away from entering the Divisi Utama in 1968. They were defeated by PSP Padang with a score of 1–2. In 2002, Persigar was coached by Dede Irawan. In the preliminary round, Persigar has beaten Persibo Bojonegoro, Persiba Bantul and PSM Madiun.

== Players ==
Note: Flags indicate national team as defined under FIFA eligibility rules; some limited exceptions apply. Players may hold more than one non-FIFA nationality.

No.	Pos.	Nation	Player
1	GK	IDN	Resa Saputra
2	DF	IDN	Rafi Farid Zahwan
4	DF	IDN	Faisal Zharfan Firdaus
5	DF	IDN	AK Paksi Kencana
7	FW	IDN	Sheva Da Yansa
8	MF	IDN	Rizki Zaelani
10	FW	IDN	Muhammad Gustiyan
11	MF	IDN	Redi Supriadi (vice-captain)
13	FW	IDN	Rudi Hermansyah
14	MF	IDN	Daffa Putra Fernaldi
16	GK	IDN	Rizki Firmansyah

No.	Pos.	Nation	Player
17	FW	IDN	Paujan Ismail
18	FW	IDN	Aldy Zikri Hermawan
19	DF	IDN	Asep Budi (captain)
20	MF	IDN	Adam Ahmad Malik
21	DF	IDN	Ihsan Maulana
22	DF	IDN	Akmal Fajri Nursyamsi
23	GK	IDN	Rizki Febrian
27	FW	IDN	Arif Budiman
28	MF	IDN	Khakam Mizan
29	DF	IDN	Muhamad Rizqi Junior
30	MF	IDN	Dzakwan Husam Sulaiman

== Coaching staff ==
Position	Name
Head coach	(Indonesia) Angga Permadi
Assistant coach	(Indonesia) Rizwan Eka (Indonesia) Dian Herdiani
Physical coach	(Indonesia) Haris Munandar
Goalkeeper coach	(Indonesia) Toha
Analyst	(Indonesia) Nugraha Subagja
Masseur	(Indonesia) Riyaldi Noor (Indonesia) Syahlan Thoyyiby
Kitman	(Indonesia) Adli Khalifatullah (Indonesia) Deidah Darussalam

== Kit suppliers and sponsors ==
Period	Kit suppliers	Shirt sponsor
2016–2017	(Indonesia) TWLF Apparel	—
2017–2018	(Indonesia) TWLF Apparel	—
2018–2019	(Indonesia) MBB Apparel	—
2019–2020	(Indonesia) Ers2 Apparel	Bank BJB; APDESI
2020–2021	—	—
2021–2022	(Indonesia) Capolista	KSA Group; Bank BJB
2022–2023	(Indonesia) Capolista	Bank BJB
2023–2024	(Indonesia) Slemn24	Bank BJB; Tirta Intan
2024–2025	(Indonesia) Slemn24	—
2025–	(Indonesia) TWLF Apparel	Rumah Sakit Medina; Bank BSI

== Notable players ==
- (Indonesia) Zaenal Arief
- (Indonesia) Nova Zaenal
- (Indonesia) Edi Hafid
- (Indonesia) Johan Juansyah
- (Indonesia) Aang Suparman
- (Indonesia) Ana Supriatna
- (Indonesia) Asep Budi
- (Indonesia) Yandi Munawar
- (Indonesia) Rudi Geofani
- (Indonesia) Agil Munawar
- (Indonesia) Fitrul Dwi Rustapa
- (Indonesia) Ripal Wahyudi

== Supporters ==
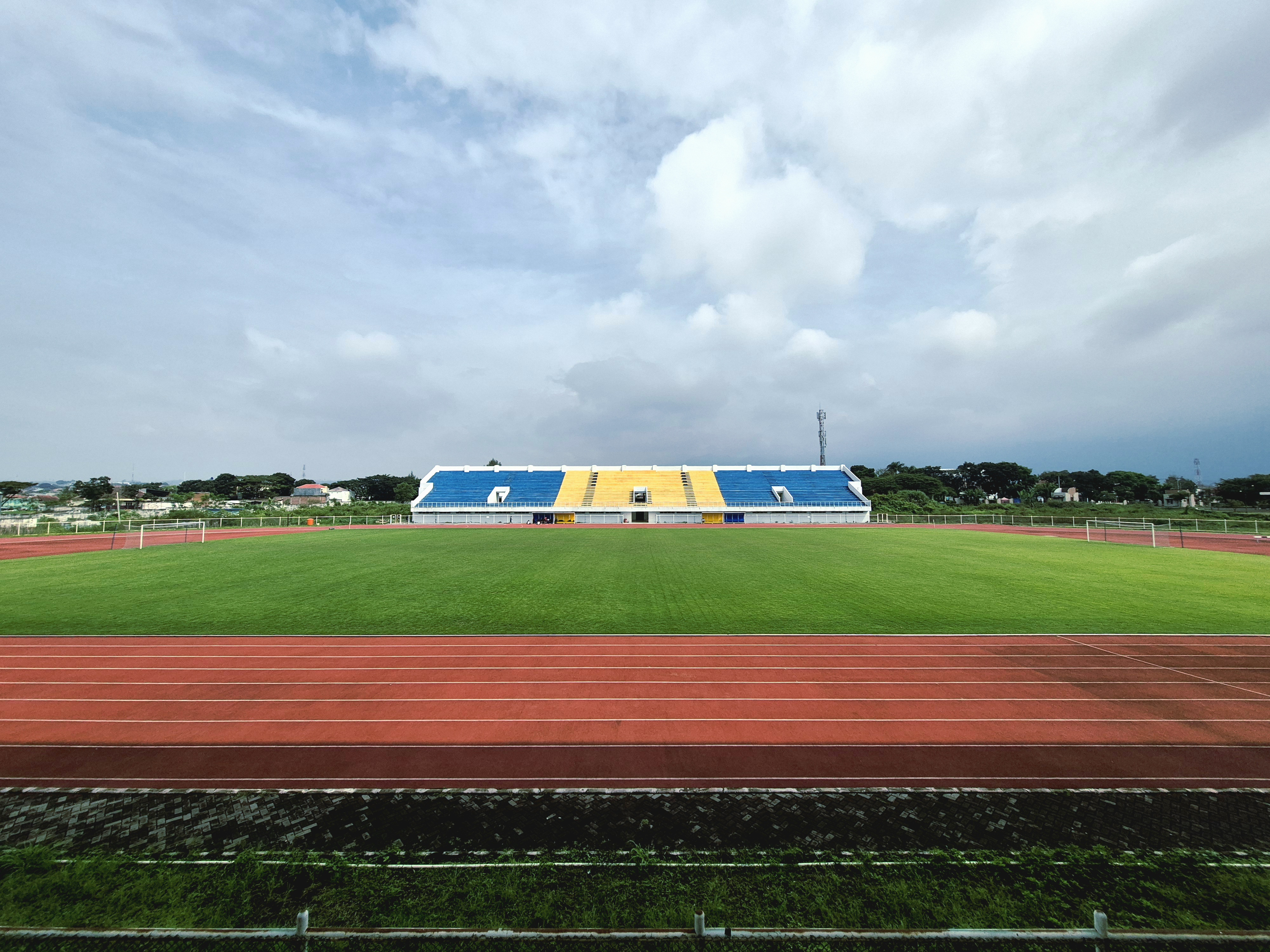
R.A.A. Adiwijaya Stadium, home of Persigar Garut.

Garut Mania (Garman) is the supporters group of Persigar Garut.

== Season-by-season records ==
Season	League/Division	Tms.	Pos.	Piala Indonesia
2004	Second Division	40	Eliminated in Provincial round	–
2005	Third Division		Eliminated in Provincial round	–
2006	Third Division		Eliminated in Provincial round	–
2007	Third Division		Eliminated in Provincial round	–
2008–09	Second Division			–
2009–10	Third Division			–
2010–11	Second Division	62	First round, 4th in Group VI	–
2012	Second Division (LPIS)	100		–
2013	Second Division	73	First round, 3rd in Group E	–
2014	Liga Nusantara	16	Second round	–
2015	Liga Nusantara	Season abandoned		
2016	ISC Liga Nusantara	32	Eliminated in Provincial round	–
2017	Liga 3	32	Eliminated in Provincial round	–
2018				
2019	Liga 3	32	Eliminated in Provincial round	–
2020	Liga 3	season abandoned		–
2021–22	Liga 3	64	Eliminated in Provincial round	–
2022–23	Liga 3	season abandoned		–
2023–24	Liga 3	80	Eliminated in Provincial round	–
2024–25	Liga 4	64	First round, 4th in Group F	–
2025–26	Liga 4			–

== Honours ==
- Champions, Soeratin Cup 1990, 1998
- Runners-up, Group C Liga 3 West Java Series 1 2023–24
