= 2014 Liga Nusantara West Sumatra =

Liga Nusantara West Sumatra
- Season: 2014

The 2014 Liga Nusantara West Sumatra season was the first edition of Liga Nusantara West Sumatra as a qualifying round of the 2014 Liga Nusantara. The competition started on 5 May 2014.

== Teams ==
All participants were amateur West Sumatra clubs.
