= Asep Budi =

Indonesian footballer

Personal information
- Full name: Asep Budi Santosa
- Date of birth: 19 December 1990 (age 35)
- Place of birth: Garut, Indonesia
- Height: 1.77 m (5 ft 10 in)
- Position: Defender

Team information
- Current team: Persigar Garut
- Number: 19

Youth career
- 2010–2012: Pelita Jaya

Senior career*
Years	Team	Apps	(Gls)
2009	Persipo Purwakarta		
2013	Persika Karawang	7	(0)
2014	Persik Kediri	10	(0)
2015	Persela Lamongan	0	(0)
2016	Persiba Balikpapan	12	(0)
2017	PSPS Pekanbaru	15	(1)
2018	Persiraja Banda Aceh	26	(1)
2019	Persita Tangerang	14	(1)
2020–2021	Persiraja Banda Aceh	1	(0)
2021–2022	Persis Solo	0	(0)
2022	PSPS Riau	2	(0)
2025–	Persigar Garut	7	(0)
- * Club domestic league appearances and goals as of 26 September 2022

Asep Budi Santosa (born 19 December 1990) is an Indonesian professional footballer who plays as a defender for club Persigar Garut.

== Club career ==
=== Persita Tangerang ===
He was signed for Persita Tangerang to play in Liga 2 in the 2019 season.

=== Persiraja Banda Aceh ===
The newly promoted club, Persiraja Banda Aceh, confirmed that Asep Budi will play for them to compete in 2020 Liga 1. This season was suspended on 27 March 2020 due to the COVID-19 pandemic. The season was abandoned and was declared void on 20 January 2021.

=== Persis Solo ===
In 2021, Asep Budi signed a contract with Indonesian Liga 2 club Persis Solo.

=== PSPS Riau ===
Asep was signed for PSPS Riau to play in Liga 2 in the 2022–23 season. He made his league debut on 29 August 2022 in a match against Semen Padang at the Riau Main Stadium, Riau.

== Honours ==
=== Club ===
Persita Tangerang

- Liga 2 runner-up: 2019
