= Tridadi Stadium =

Multi-use stadium in Sleman, Indonesia

Tridadi Stadium ꦱ꧀ꦠꦣꦶꦪꦺꦴꦤ꧀ꦠꦿꦶꦢꦢꦶ
- Interactive map of Tridadi Stadium ꦱ꧀ꦠꦣꦶꦪꦺꦴꦤ꧀ꦠꦿꦶꦢꦢꦶ
- Address: Sleman; Indonesia
- Location: Sleman Regency, Special Region of Yogyakarta
- Coordinates: 7.719534°S 110.358567°E
- Owner: Government of Sleman Regency
- Operator: Government of Sleman Regency
- Capacity: 12,000
- Surface: Grass field

Tenants
- PSS Sleman; Sleman United

Tridadi Stadium (Indonesian: Stadion Tridadi, Javanese: ꦱ꧀ꦠꦣꦶꦪꦺꦴꦤ꧀ꦠꦿꦶꦢꦢꦶ, romanized: Stadhiyon Tridadi) is a multi-use stadium in Sleman, Indonesia. It is currently used mostly for football matches and is used as the home stadium for PSS Sleman and Sleman United. The stadium has a capacity of 12,000 people.
