= Gelora Handayani Stadium =

- Stadion Gelora Handayani
- Location in Java and Indonesia Gelora Handayani Stadium (Indonesia)
- Full name: Stadion Gelora Handayani
- Address: Jl. Taman Bakti, Jeruksari, Wonosari, Gunung Kidul Regency, Yogyakarta 55851; Indonesia
- Location: Wonosari, Gunung Kidul Regency, Yogyakarta
- Coordinates: 7.954759°S 110.605073°E
- Owner: Regency Government of Gunung Kidul
- Operator: Regency Government of Gunung Kidul
- Capacity: 10,000
- Surface: Grass field

Tenant
- Persig Gunungkidul

Gelora Handayani Stadium (Indonesian: Stadion Gelora Handayani, Javanese: ꦱ꧀ꦠꦣꦶꦪꦺꦴꦤ꧀ꦒꦼꦭꦺꦴꦫꦲꦤ꧀ꦢꦪꦤꦶ, romanized: Stadhiyon Gelora Handayani) is a multi-purpose stadium in Wonosari, Gunung Kidul Regency, Special Region of Yogyakarta, Indonesia. It is primarily used for soccer matches, but also hosts athletics events. The stadium has a capacity of 10,000.
