= Persitas Takengon =

Association football club in Indonesia

Persitas
- Full name: Persatuan Sepakbola Indonesia Takengon Sekitarnya
- Nickname: Kuda Pegasing
- Ground: Musara Alun Stadium; Takengon, Central Aceh, Aceh
- Owner: PSSI Central Aceh
- Chairman: Majid
- Manager: Majid
- Coach: Muhammad Azhar
- League: Liga 4
- 2021: Liga 3, withdraw
Home colours	Away colours

Persatuan Sepakbola Indonesia Takengon Sekitarnya (simply known as Persitas) is an Indonesian football club based in Takengon, Central Aceh Regency, Aceh. They currently compete in the Liga 4 Aceh zone and their homeground is Musara Alun Stadium.
