= Persesi Siantar =

Indonesian football club in North Sumatra

- Full name: Persatuan Sepakbola Indonesia Pematangsiantar
- Nickname: Laskar Sangnaualuh
- Founded: 1962; 64 years ago
- Ground: Sangnaualuh Stadium; Pematangsiantar, North Sumatra
- Capacity: 10,000
- Owner: Pematangsiantar City Government
- CEO: Jonner Silaen
- Coach: Hazmin Fath
- League: Liga 3
- 2021: 4th in Group F, (North Sumatra zone)
Home colours	Away colours

Persatuan Sepakbola Indonesia Pematangsiantar (simply known as Persesi Siantar or Persesi) is an Indonesian football club based in Pematangsiantar, North Sumatra. They currently compete in the Liga 4 and their homeground is Sangnaualuh Stadium.

== Players ==
=== Current squad ===
As of 31 August 2021

Note: Flags indicate national team as defined under FIFA eligibility rules; some limited exceptions apply. Players may hold more than one non-FIFA nationality.

No.	Pos.	Nation	Player
1	GK	IDN	Suwanda Nugroho
2	DF	IDN	Yuda
3	DF	IDN	Bagas Surya
4	DF	IDN	Muhammad Safii
5	DF	IDN	Timbul Sinaga
6	MF	IDN	Dafi Damanik
7	FW	IDN	Anggi Triwirya Tama
8	MF	IDN	Christeven Silalahi
9	FW	IDN	Yoppy Noya
10	FW	IDN	Jeni Noya
11	FW	IDN	Yabes Siahaan
12	GK	IDN	Alrandy

No.	Pos.	Nation	Player
13	MF	IDN	Muhammad Devri Siregar
14	MF	IDN	Disky Sagala
16	MF	IDN	Reinaldi Simanjuntak
17	MF	IDN	Renaldo Simanjuntak
18	FW	IDN	Muhammad Rifa'i Tarigan
19	MF	IDN	Hamid Pakpahan
21	DF	IDN	Akbar
23	DF	IDN	Prayogi
26	DF	IDN	Muhammad Taufiq Pranoto
27	GK	IDN	Gilang Ary
