= Persikup Kulon Progo =

Indonesian football club in Special Region of Yogyakarta

Persikup
- Full name: Persatuan Sepakbola Indonesia Kulon Progo
- Nicknames: Pendekar Bukit Menoreh; The Java Horse
- Short name: Persikup
- Founded: 1976; 50 years ago
- Ground: Cangkring Stadium, Kulon Progo, Special Region of Yogyakarta
- Capacity: 7,000
- Owner: PSSI Kulon Progo
- Manager: Subiyakto
- Coach: Maruta
- League: Liga 4
- 2021: 4th in Group C, (Special Region of Yogyakarta zone)
Home colours	Away colours

Persatuan Sepakbola Indonesia Kulon Progo (simply known as Persikup) is an Indonesian football club based in Kulon Progo Regency, Special Region of Yogyakarta. They currently compete in the Liga 4.
