= PS HW UMY =

- Full name: Perkumpulan Sepakbola Hizbul Wathan Universitas Muhammadiyah Yogyakarta
- Nickname: The Young Boys
- Short name: PS HW UMY
- Ground: UMY Football Field
- Owner: Muhammadiyah University of Yogyakarta
- Chairman: Achmad Nurmandi
- Coach: Nopendi
- League: Liga 4
- 2024–25: 1st (Special Region of Yogyakarta zone); First round, 4th in Group A (National phase)
Home colours	Away colours

Perkumpulan Sepakbola Hizbul Wathan Universitas Muhammadiyah Yogyakarta (simply known as PS HW UMY) is an Indonesian football club based in Bantul, Special Region of Yogyakarta. They currently compete in the Liga 4 Special Region of Yogyakarta Zone.

== Honours ==
- Liga 3 Special Region of Yogyakarta
  - Runners-up (1) : 2023
- Liga 4 Special Region of Yogyakarta
  - Champions (1) : 2024–25
