= Satria Adikarta F.C. =

Indonesian football club in Special Region of Yogyakarta

Satria Adikarta
- Full name: Satria Adikarta Football Club
- Nickname: Laskar Nyi Ageng Serang
- Ground: Cangkring Stadium, Kulon Progo, Special Region of Yogyakarta
- Capacity: 7,000
- Owner: Askab PSSI Kulon Progo
- Chairman: Beni Purwoko
- Manager: Hari Santoso
- Coach: Heri Cahyono
- League: Liga 4
- 2021: Semi-finals, (Special Region of Yogyakarta zone)
Home colours	Away colours

Satria Adikarta Football Club (simply known as Satria Adikarta or PS Satria Adikarta) is an Indonesian football club based in Kulon Progo Regency, Special Region of Yogyakarta. They currently compete in the Liga 4.

== Honours ==
- Liga 3 Special Region of Yogyakarta
  - Champion: 2017
