= Sleman United F.C. =

Indonesian football club

Sleman United
- Full name: Sleman United Football Club
- Nickname: Si Elang Kecil (Young Eagles)
- Short name: SU
- Founded: 2012; 14 years ago
- Ground: Tridadi Stadium; Sleman
- Capacity: 12.000
- Owner: Wahyudi Kurniawan
- Manager: Handoko Susanto
- Coach: Yudha Hendrasworo
- League: Liga 4
- 2021–22: Liga 3, Round of 64 (National)
Home colours	Away colours

Sleman United Football Club (simply known as Sleman United) is an Indonesian football club based in Sleman, Special Region of Yogyakarta. They currently compete in the Liga 4 and their homebase is Tridadi Stadium.

== Players ==
=== Current squad ===
As of 31 August 2021

Note: Flags indicate national team as defined under FIFA eligibility rules; some limited exceptions apply. Players may hold more than one non-FIFA nationality.

No.	Pos.	Nation	Player
1	GK	IDN	Firdaus Rafi
4	FW	IDN	Riska Aji Prasojo
5	DF	IDN	Sugeng Prayogi
6	DF	IDN	Agus Prasetyo
7	MF	IDN	Rachmad Budi
8	MF	IDN	Yudha Apriansyah
9	FW	IDN	Abdur Razaq
10	MF	IDN	Yogi Tri Prasetyo
11	DF	IDN	Rafli Irwananta
13	MF	IDN	Maezar Rizaldy
16	MF	IDN	Dimas Safa Rizki
17	MF	IDN	Veryan Ramadhan

No.	Pos.	Nation	Player
19	MF	IDN	Tesar Okta
20	GK	IDN	Cakra Adi Surya
21	DF	IDN	Muhammad Agung
23	MF	IDN	Adhe Yusuf
24	MF	IDN	Betran Naufal Rafif
25	DF	IDN	Muhammad Faiz
27	MF	IDN	Mochammad Solechudin
30	GK	IDN	Dedy Prihmanto
31	MF	IDN	Samsul Pelu
32	MF	IDN	Aliffian Himawan
34	DF	IDN	Tri Bayu Firmansyah

== Honours ==
- Liga 3 Special Region of Yogyakarta
  - Champions (2): 2014, 2019
  - Runner-up (1): 2021
