= Persig Gunungkidul =

Indonesian football club

Persig Gunung Kidul
- Full name: Persatuan Sepakbola Indonesia Gunung Kidul
- Nickname: Owa Jawa
- Founded: 1976; 50 years ago
- Ground: Gelora Handayani Stadium, Gunung Kidul, Yogyakarta
- Capacity: 10,000
- Manager: Tinus Tri Sulistyo
- Coach: Titus Suharto
- League: Liga 4
- 2021: 3rd in Second Round of Group X, (Special Region of Yogyakarta zone)
Home colours	Away colours

Persatuan Sepakbola Indonesia Gunung Kidul (commonly known as Persig Gunung Kidul) is an Indonesian football club from Gunung Kidul Regency, Special Region of Yogyakarta. Currently Persig Gunungkidul competes in the Indonesian League Fourth Division DIY zone, Liga 4.

== Grounds ==
Gelora Handayani Stadium is the home base of this club. Gelora Handayani Stadium is a multi-purpose stadium in Wonosari, Indonesia. It is currently used mostly for soccer matches and also sometimes for athletics. The stadium has a capacity of 10,000.

== Supporters ==
Persig is a football club in Indonesia. The club has supporter groups named Supergeni, GardapatiGK, The Guident, and The Hanter.
