= Sušje =

Sušje may refer to more than one place in Slovenia:

- Sušje, Črnomelj, a former settlement in the Municipality of Črnomelj
- Sušje, Ribnica, a settlement in the Municipality of Ribnica
