= Grič, Ribnica =

Grič
- Location in Slovenia
- Coordinates: 45°45′21.18″N 14°42′42.45″E
- Country: Slovenia
- Traditional region: Lower Carniola
- Statistical region: Southeast Slovenia
- Municipality: Ribnica

Area
  - Total: 0.33 km^{2} (0.13 sq mi)
- Elevation: 504.7 m (1,656 ft)

Population (2002)
  - Total: 321
- Postal code: 1310

Grič (pronounced [ˈɡɾiːtʃ]) is a settlement in the Municipality of Ribnica in southern Slovenia. It lies just northwest of the town of Ribnica, on the main road to Velike Lašče, and forms a more or less continuous settlement with the neighbouring villages of Dolenji Lazi and Breg. The area is part of the traditional region of Lower Carniola and is now included in the Southeast Slovenia Statistical Region.
