= Jurjevica =

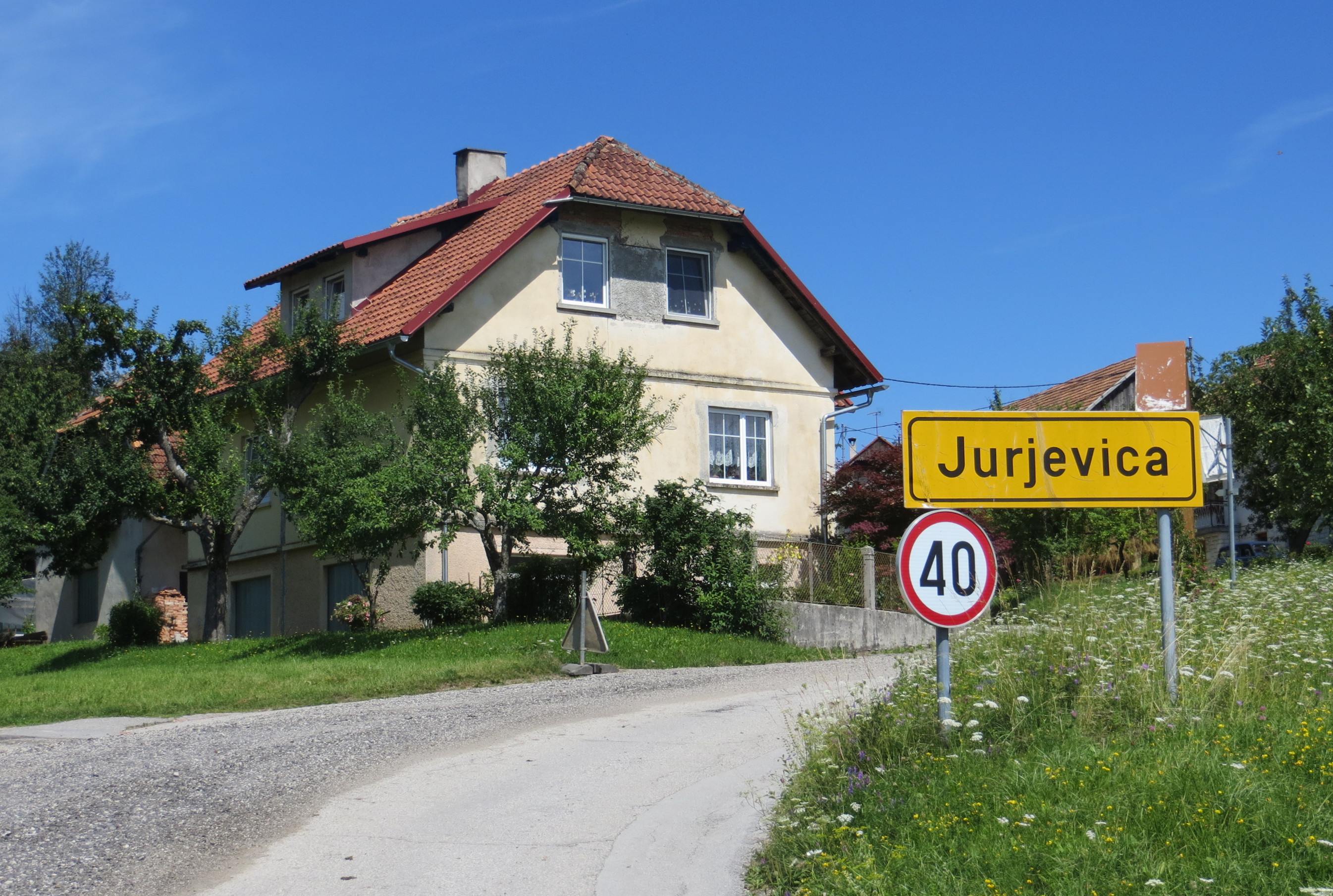

- Location in Slovenia
- Coordinates: 45°45′1.56″N 14°41′29.9″E
- Country: Slovenia
- Traditional region: Lower Carniola
- Statistical region: Southeast Slovenia
- Municipality: Ribnica

Area
  - Total: 1.74 km^{2} (0.67 sq mi)
- Elevation: 542.1 m (1,779 ft)

Population (2002)
  - Total: 227
- Postal code: 1310

Jurjevica (pronounced [ˈjuːɾjɛʋitsa]; German: Jurjowitz) is a village west of the town of Ribnica in southern Slovenia. The area is part of the traditional region of Lower Carniola and is now included in the Southeast Slovenia Statistical Region. The settlement includes the hamlet of Pajničev Mlin (German: Pajnitz'sche Mühlen).

The local church, built northeast of the village, is dedicated to the Holy Cross and belongs to the Parish of Ribnica. It dates to the 17th century. A series of fourteen roadside chapel-shrines with the Stations of the Cross lead to the church along the road from the neighbouring village of Breže.
