= Praproče, Ribnica =

Praproče
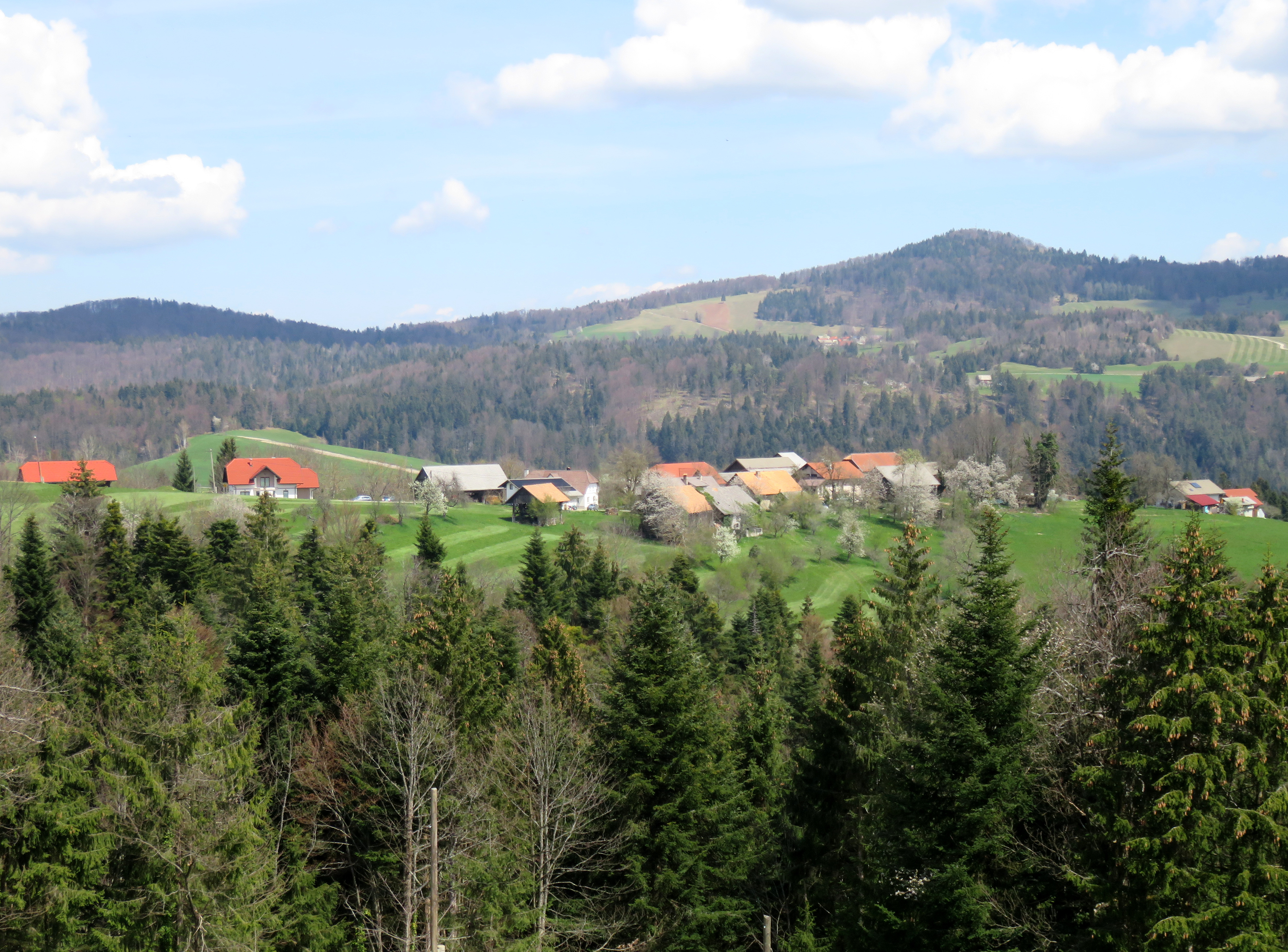

- Location in Slovenia
- Coordinates: 45°47′47.16″N 14°39′58.69″E
- Country: Slovenia
- Traditional region: Lower Carniola
- Statistical region: Southeast Slovenia
- Municipality: Ribnica

Area
  - Total: 0.93 km^{2} (0.36 sq mi)
- Elevation: 645.8 m (2,119 ft)

Population (2002)
  - Total: 31
- Postal code: 1316

Praproče (pronounced [ˈpɾaːpɾɔtʃɛ]) is a settlement northwest of Ortnek in the Municipality of Ribnica in southern Slovenia. The area is part of the traditional region of Lower Carniola and is now included in the Southeast Slovenia Statistical Region.
