= Črni Potok pri Velikih Laščah =

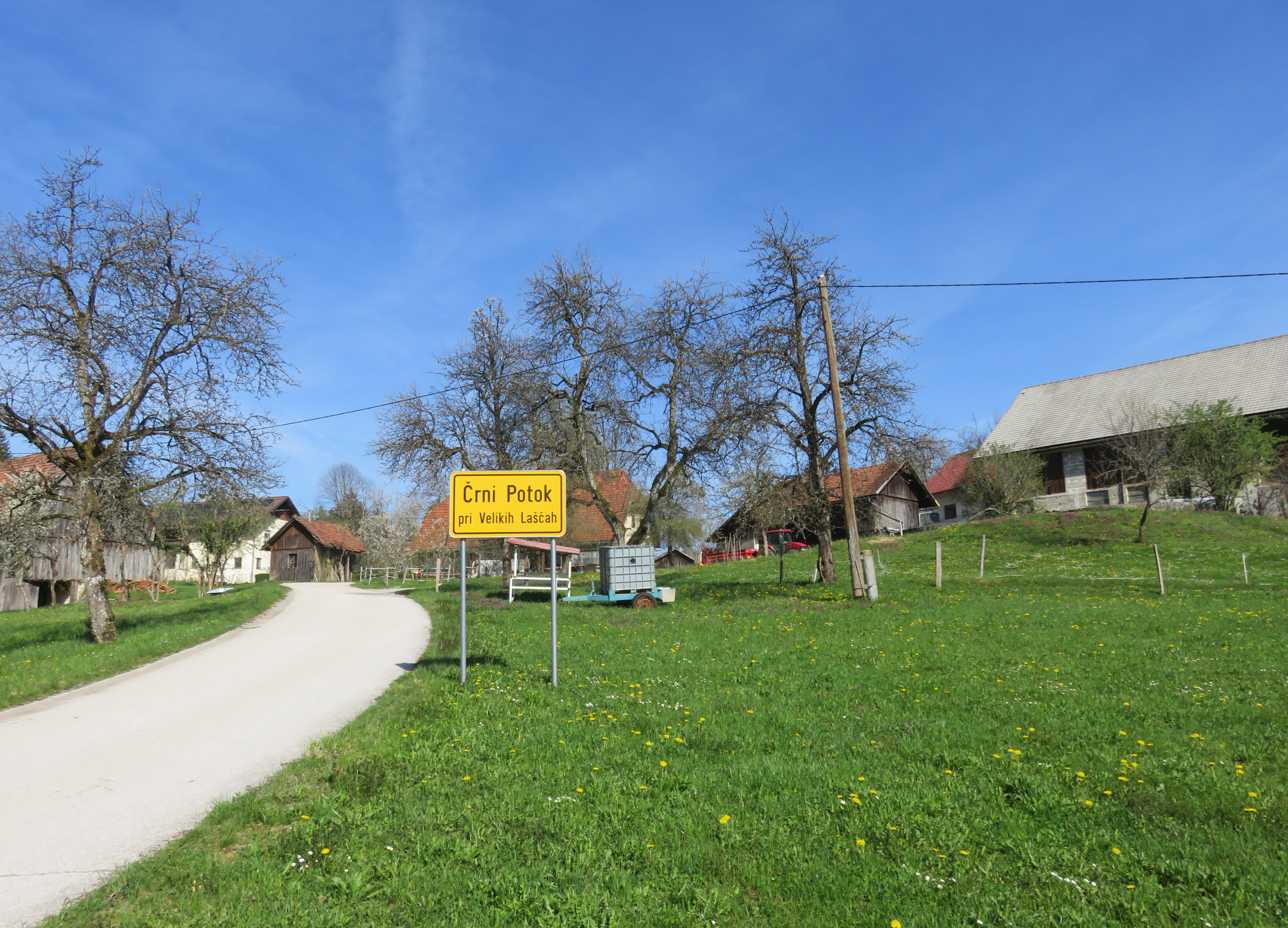

- Location in Slovenia
- Coordinates: 45°47′57.59″N 14°36′52.46″E
- Country: Slovenia
- Traditional region: Lower Carniola
- Statistical region: Southeast Slovenia
- Municipality: Ribnica

Area
  - Total: 0.97 km^{2} (0.37 sq mi)
- Elevation: 621.4 m (2,039 ft)

Population (2002)
  - Total: 29
- Postal code: 1315

Črni Potok pri Velikih Laščah (pronounced [ˈtʃəɾni ˈpɔːtɔk pɾi ˈʋeːlikix ˈlaːʃtʃax]; German: Schwarzenbach) is a small settlement in the hills south of Velike Lašče in southern Slovenia. It lies in the Municipality of Ribnica. The entire municipality is part of the traditional region of Lower Carniola and is now included in the Southeast Slovenia Statistical Region.

== Name ==
The name of the settlement was changed from Črni Potok to Črni Potok pri Velikih Laščah in 1953. In the past the German name was Schwarzenbach.
