= Dule, Ribnica =

Dule
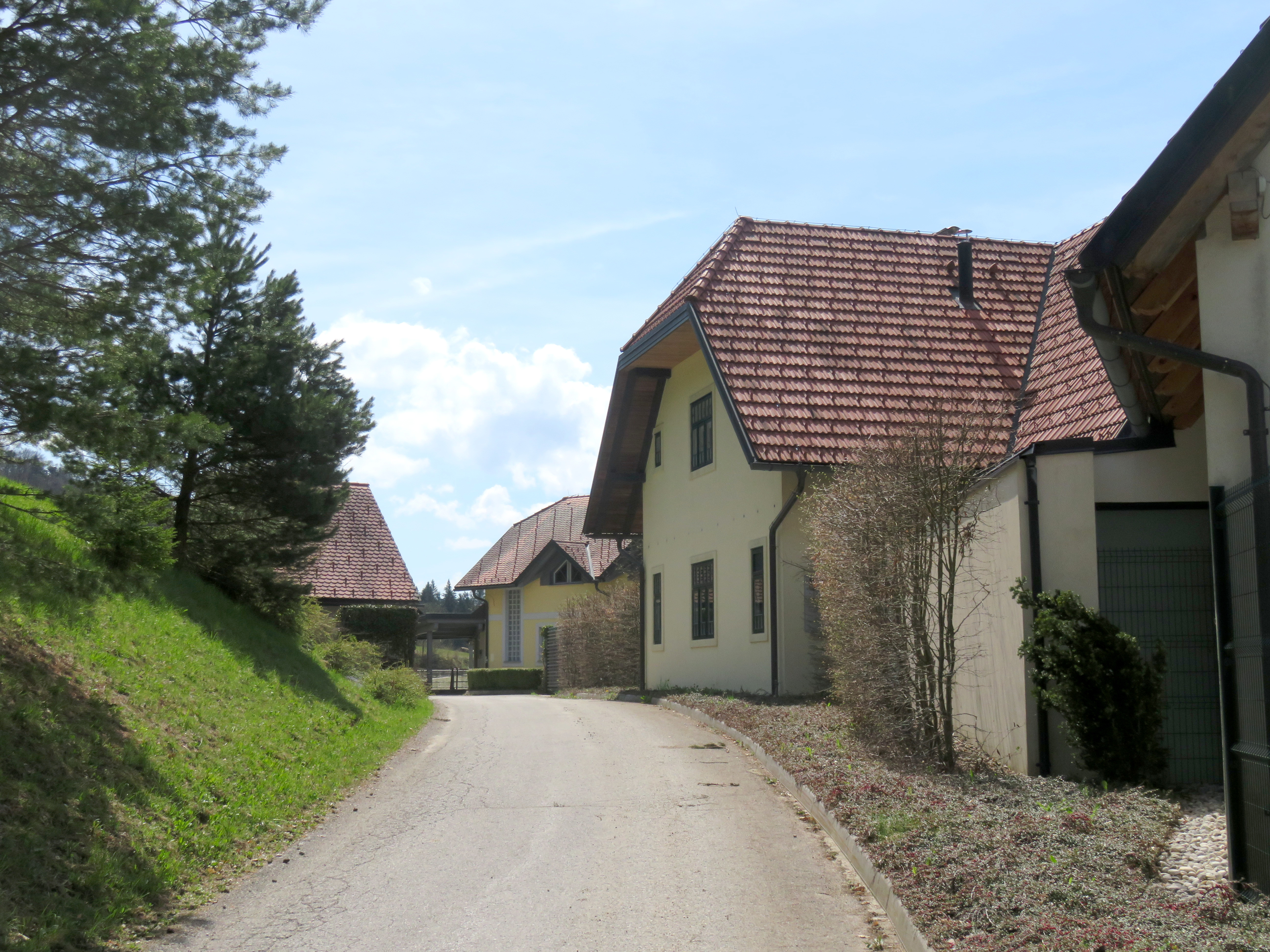

- Location in Slovenia
- Coordinates: 45°47′24.33″N 14°40′59.95″E
- Country: Slovenia
- Traditional region: Lower Carniola
- Statistical region: Southeast Slovenia
- Municipality: Ribnica

Area
  - Total: 5.11 km^{2} (1.97 sq mi)
- Elevation: 555.5 m (1,823 ft)

Population (2002)
  - Total: 4
- Postal code: 1316

Dule (pronounced [ˈduːlɛ]; in older sources also Dole) is a small settlement south of Velike Poljane in the Municipality of Ribnica in southern Slovenia. The area is part of the traditional region of Lower Carniola and is now included in the Southeast Slovenia Statistical Region.
