= Vrh pri Poljanah =

- Location in Slovenia
- Coordinates: 45°48′41.88″N 14°41′48.15″E
- Country: Slovenia
- Traditional region: Lower Carniola
- Statistical region: Southeast Slovenia
- Municipality: Ribnica

Area
  - Total: 0.47 km^{2} (0.18 sq mi)
- Elevation: 826.5 m (2,712 ft)

Population (2002)
  - Total: 0
- Postal code: 1316

Vrh pri Poljanah (pronounced [ˈʋəɾx pɾi pɔˈljaːnax]) is a small settlement in the hills north of Velike Poljane in the Municipality of Ribnica in southern Slovenia. It lies just south of the town of Ribnica. The area is part of the traditional region of Lower Carniola and is now included in the Southeast Slovenia Statistical Region.

== Name ==
The name of the settlement was changed from Vrh to Vrh pri Poljanah in 1953.

== Cultural heritage ==
A roadside chapel-shrine south of the settlement is dedicated to Saint Anthony of Padua. It was built in the early 20th century.
