= Marolče =

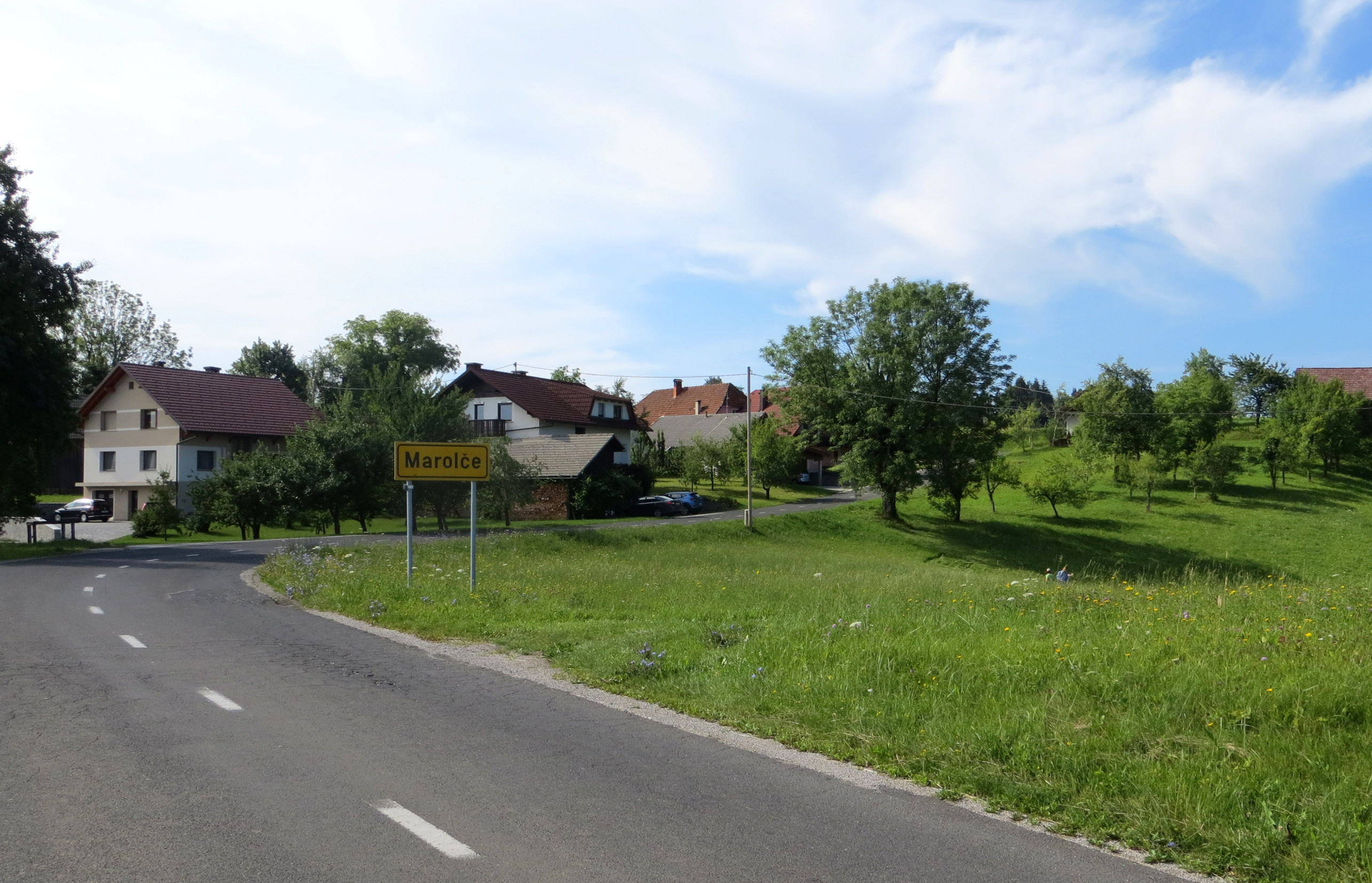

- Location in Slovenia
- Coordinates: 45°47′46.54″N 14°38′21.45″E
- Country: Slovenia
- Traditional region: Lower Carniola
- Statistical region: Southeast Slovenia
- Municipality: Ribnica

Area
  - Total: 0.67 km^{2} (0.26 sq mi)
- Elevation: 662.9 m (2,175 ft)

Population (2002)
  - Total: 30
- Postal code: 1316

Marolče (pronounced [ˈmaːɾou̯tʃɛ]) is a small settlement in the Municipality of Ribnica in southern Slovenia. It lies north of Sveti Gregor, just off the main road to Velike Lašče. The entire Municipality of Ribnica is part of the traditional region of Lower Carniola and is now included in the Southeast Slovenia Statistical Region.
