= Makoše =

- Location in Slovenia
- Coordinates: 45°43′16.15″N 14°47′46.93″E
- Country: Slovenia
- Traditional region: Lower Carniola
- Statistical region: Southeast Slovenia
- Municipality: Ribnica

Area
  - Total: 3.92 km^{2} (1.51 sq mi)
- Elevation: 478.9 m (1,571 ft)

Population (2002)
  - Total: 0
- Postal code: 1331

Makoše (pronounced [ˈmaːkɔʃɛ]; in older sources also Makovže, German: Makusche) is a settlement in the hills east of Dolenja Vas in the Municipality of Ribnica in southern Slovenia. It no longer has any permanent residents. The area is part of the traditional region of Lower Carniola and is now included in the Southeast Slovenia Statistical Region.
