= Andol, Ribnica =

Andol
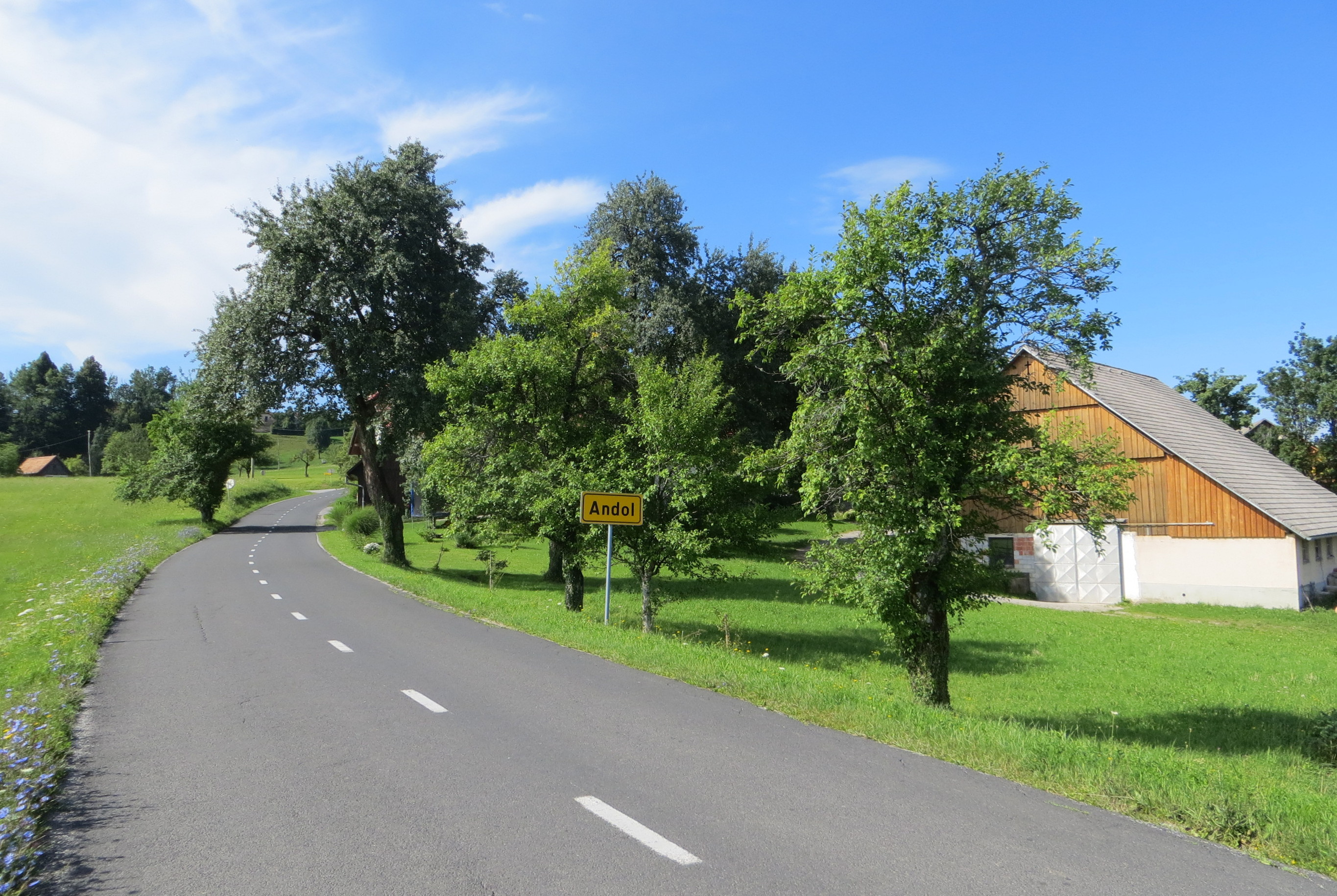

- Location in Slovenia
- Coordinates: 45°47′18.7″N 14°38′28.11″E
- Country: Slovenia
- Traditional region: Lower Carniola
- Statistical region: Southeast Slovenia
- Municipality: Ribnica

Area
  - Total: 0.28 km^{2} (0.11 sq mi)
- Elevation: 689.4 m (2,262 ft)

Population (2002)
  - Total: 18
- Postal code: 1316

Andol (pronounced [anˈdoːu̯]) is a small settlement in the hills north of Sodražica in southern Slovenia. It lies in the Municipality of Ribnica. The area is part of the traditional region of Lower Carniola and is now included in the Southeast Slovenia Statistical Region.
