= Grebenje =

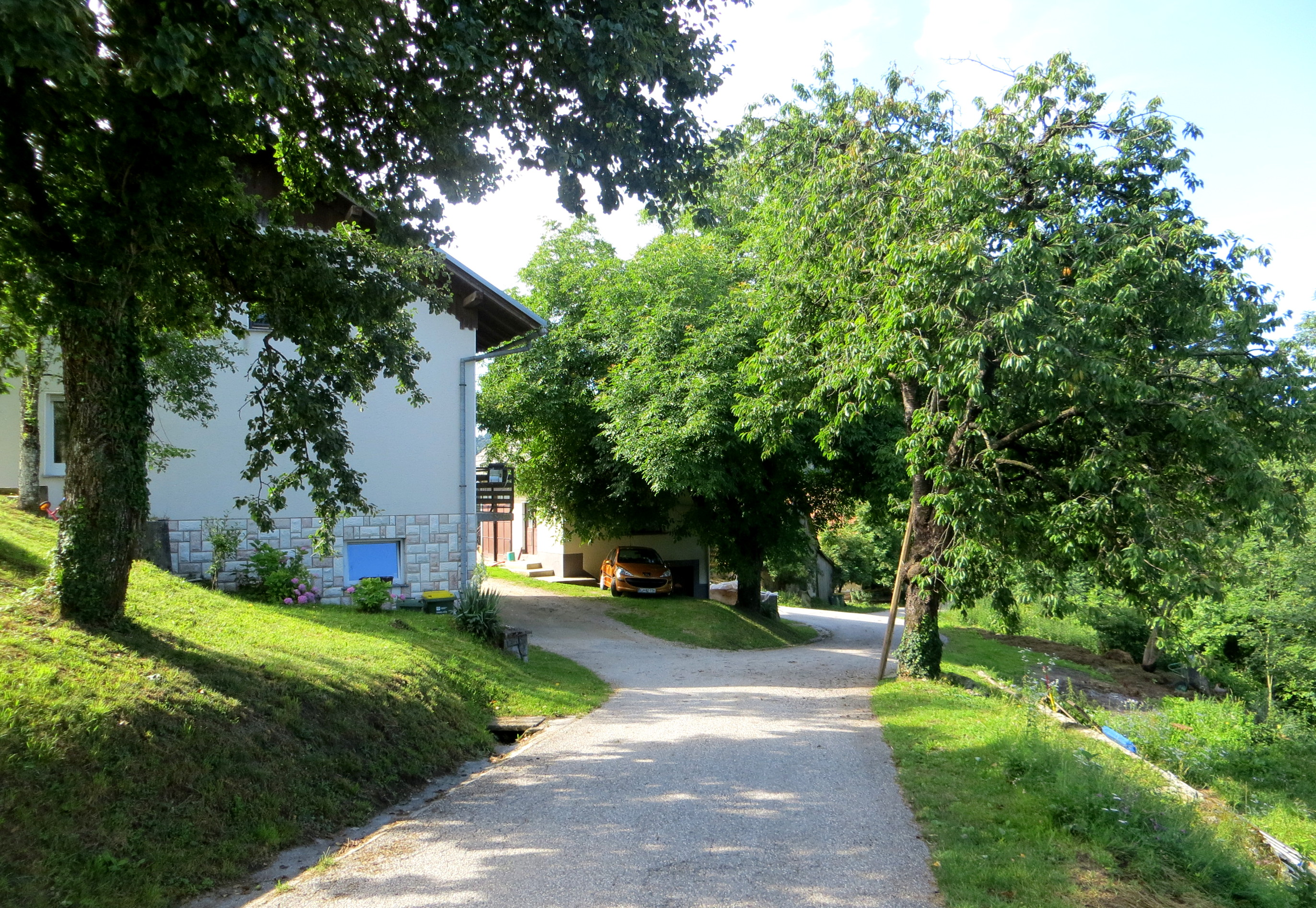

- Location in Slovenia
- Coordinates: 45°47′56.45″N 14°37′41.56″E
- Country: Slovenia
- Traditional region: Lower Carniola
- Statistical region: Southeast Slovenia
- Municipality: Ribnica

Area
  - Total: 0.71 km^{2} (0.27 sq mi)
- Elevation: 591.6 m (1,941 ft)

Population (2002)
  - Total: 12
- Postal code: 1315

Grebenje (pronounced [ˈɡɾeːbɛnjɛ]) is a small settlement in the hills south of Velike Lašče in southern Slovenia. It lies in the Municipality of Ribnica. The entire municipality is part of the traditional region of Lower Carniola and is now included in the Southeast Slovenia Statistical Region.
