= Gorenje Podpoljane =

- Location in Slovenia
- Coordinates: 45°48′17.27″N 14°39′56.2″E
- Country: Slovenia
- Traditional region: Lower Carniola
- Statistical region: Southeast Slovenia
- Municipality: Ribnica

Area
  - Total: 0.51 km^{2} (0.20 sq mi)
- Elevation: 609.1 m (1,998 ft)

Population (2002)
  - Total: 25
- Postal code: 1316

Gorenje Podpoljane (pronounced [ɡɔˈɾeːnjɛ pɔtpɔˈljaːnɛ]; German: Oberpölland) is a small settlement in the Municipality of Ribnica in southern Slovenia. It lies just west of the main road from Velike Lašče to Ribnica and the railway line from Ljubljana to Kočevje. The area is part of the traditional region of Lower Carniola and is now included in the Southeast Slovenia Statistical Region.
