= Bukovec pri Poljanah =

- Location in Slovenia
- Coordinates: 45°48′52.44″N 14°40′58.99″E
- Country: Slovenia
- Traditional region: Lower Carniola
- Statistical region: Southeast Slovenia
- Municipality: Ribnica

Area
  - Total: 0.74 km^{2} (0.29 sq mi)
- Elevation: 699.2 m (2,294 ft)

Population (2002)
  - Total: 9
- Postal code: 1316

Bukovec pri Poljanah (pronounced [ˈbuːkɔʋəts pɾi pɔˈljaːnax]; in older sources also Bukovica, German: Bukowitz) is a small settlement north of Velike Poljane in the Municipality of Ribnica in southern Slovenia. The area is part of the traditional region of Lower Carniola and is now included in the Southeast Slovenia Statistical Region.

== Name ==
The name of the settlement was changed from Bukovec to Bukovec pri Poljanah in 1955. In the past the German name was Bukowitz.
