= Dolenje Podpoljane =

- Location in Slovenia
- Coordinates: 45°48′11.85″N 14°40′24.95″E
- Country: Slovenia
- Traditional region: Lower Carniola
- Statistical region: Southeast Slovenia
- Municipality: Ribnica

Area
  - Total: 0.75 km^{2} (0.29 sq mi)
- Elevation: 594.6 m (1,951 ft)

Population (2002)
  - Total: 50
- Postal code: 1316

Dolenje Podpoljane (pronounced [dɔˈleːnjɛ pɔtpɔˈljaːnɛ]; German: Unterpölland) is a small settlement halfway between Ribnica and Velike Lašče in southern Slovenia. The area is part of the traditional region of Lower Carniola and is now included in the Southeast Slovenia Statistical Region.
