= Zadniki =

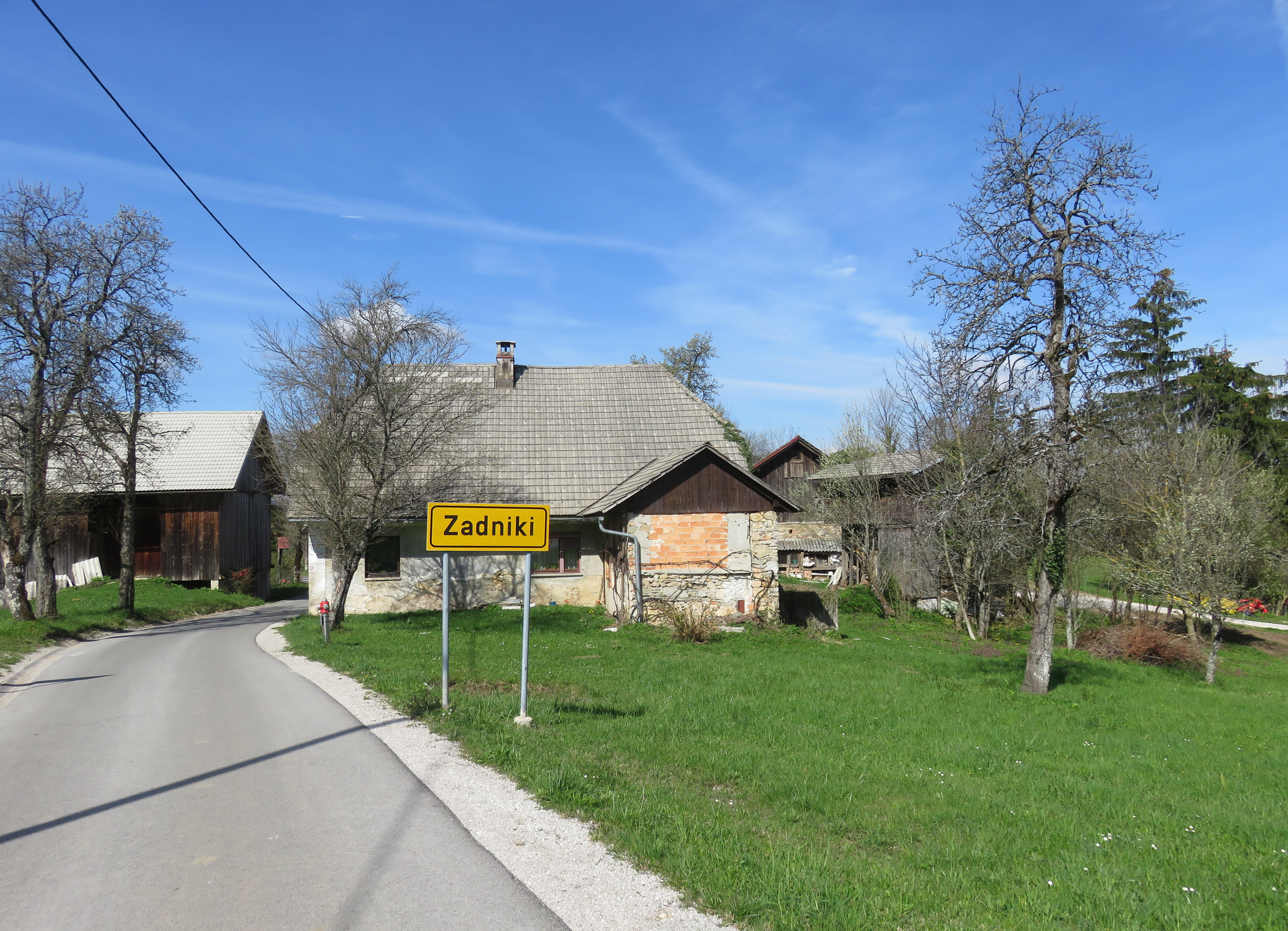

- Location in Slovenia
- Coordinates: 45°47′5.08″N 14°36′43.1″E
- Country: Slovenia
- Traditional region: Lower Carniola
- Statistical region: Southeast Slovenia
- Municipality: Ribnica

Area
  - Total: 0.58 km^{2} (0.22 sq mi)
- Elevation: 648.8 m (2,129 ft)

Population (2002)
  - Total: 14
- Postal code: 1316

Zadniki (pronounced [ˈzaːdniki]) is a settlement west of Sveti Gregor in the Municipality of Ribnica in southern Slovenia. It includes three hamlets: Zadniki, Mlake, and Avžlah. The area is part of the traditional region of Lower Carniola and is now included in the Southeast Slovenia Statistical Region.
