= Žukovo =

- Location in Slovenia
- Coordinates: 45°48′29.23″N 14°41′44.05″E
- Country: Slovenia
- Traditional region: Lower Carniola
- Statistical region: Southeast Slovenia
- Municipality: Ribnica

Area
  - Total: 1.14 km^{2} (0.44 sq mi)
- Elevation: 781.3 m (2,563 ft)

Population (2002)
  - Total: 9
- Postal code: 1316

Žukovo (pronounced [ˈʒuːkɔʋɔ]) is a settlement in the hills north of Velike Poljane in the Municipality of Ribnica in southern Slovenia. The entire municipality is part of the traditional region of Lower Carniola and is now included in the Southeast Slovenia Statistical Region.
