= Slatnik =

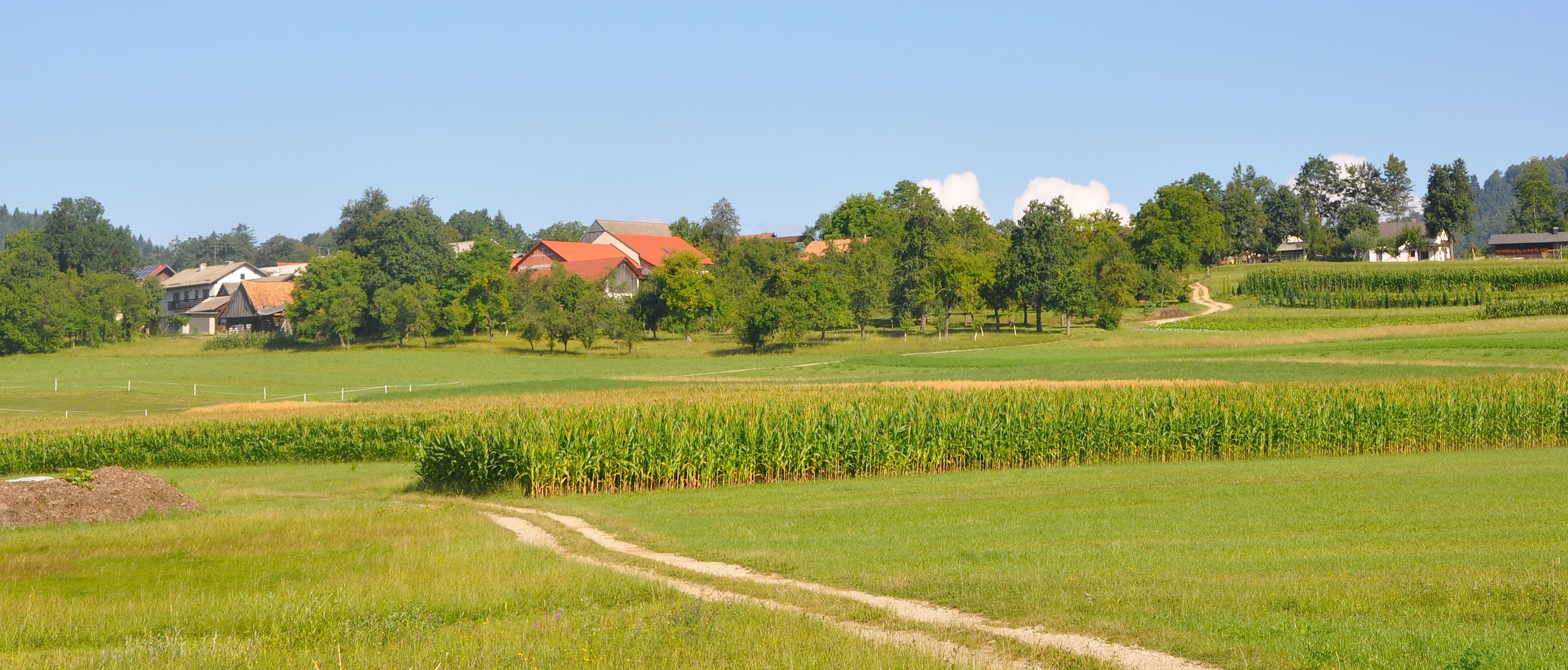

- Location in Slovenia
- Coordinates: 45°45′52.05″N 14°41′15.74″E
- Country: Slovenia
- Traditional region: Lower Carniola
- Statistical region: Southeast Slovenia
- Municipality: Ribnica

Area
  - Total: 0.74 km^{2} (0.29 sq mi)
- Elevation: 535.9 m (1,758 ft)

Population (2002)
  - Total: 123
- Postal code: 1310

Slatnik (pronounced [ˈslaːtnik]; German: Slatenegg) is a village in the Municipality of Ribnica in southern Slovenia. It lies just north of the town of Ribnica. The area is part of the traditional region of Lower Carniola and is now included in the Southeast Slovenia Statistical Region.

A small chapel-shrine in the settlement is dedicated to the Virgin Mary and dates to the early 20th century.
