= Kot pri Rakitnici =

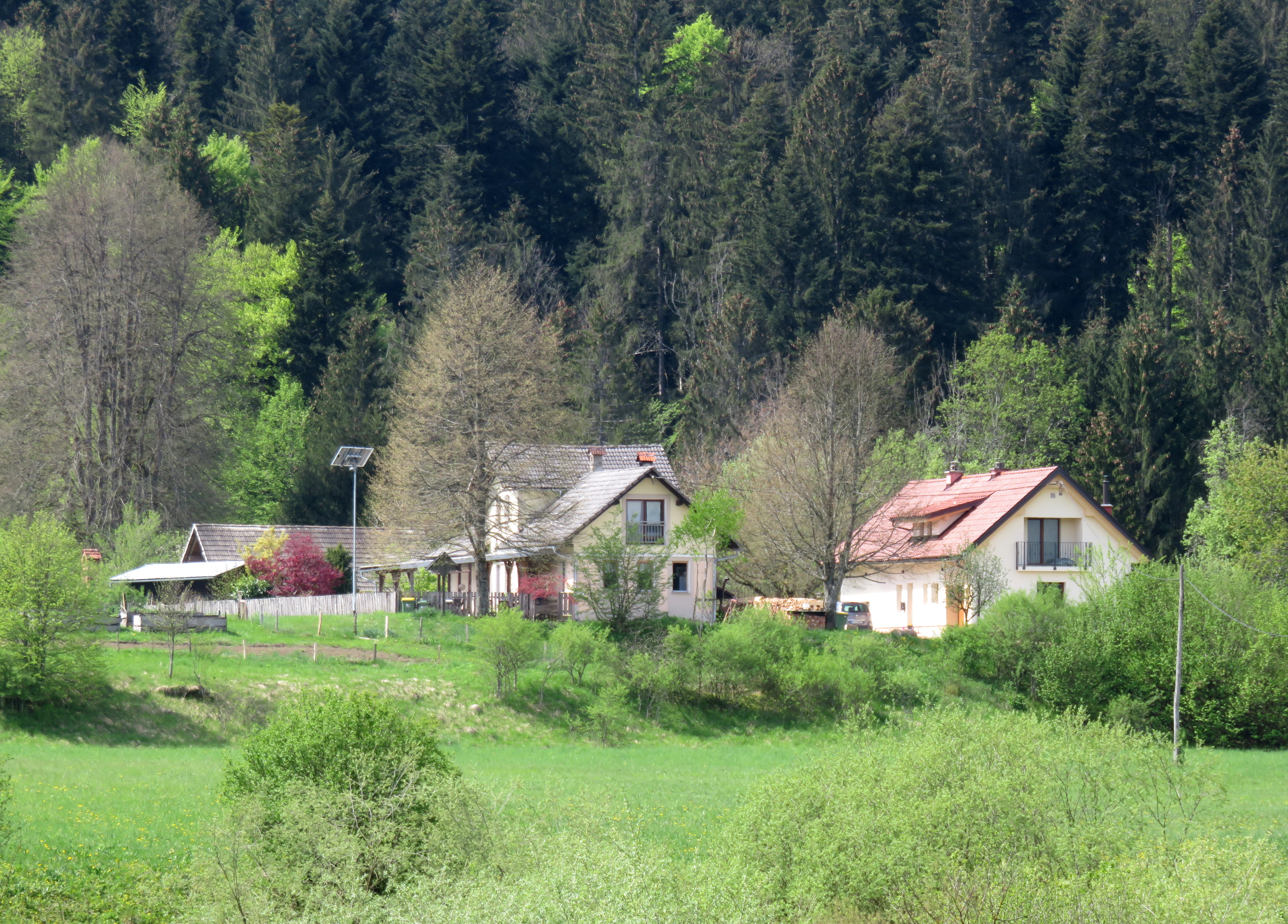

- Location in Slovenia
- Coordinates: 45°41′34.78″N 14°45′0.94″E
- Country: Slovenia
- Traditional region: Lower Carniola
- Statistical region: Southeast Slovenia
- Municipality: Ribnica

Area
  - Total: 2.17 km^{2} (0.84 sq mi)
- Elevation: 481.3 m (1,579 ft)

Population (2002)
  - Total: 5
- Postal code: 1331

Kot pri Rakitnici (pronounced [ˈkoːt pɾi ɾaˈkiːtnitsi]; German: Winkel) is a small settlement west of the village of Rakitnica in the Municipality of Ribnica in southern Slovenia. The area is part of the traditional region of Lower Carniola and is now included in the Southeast Slovenia Statistical Region.

== Name ==
The name of the settlement was changed from Kot to Kot pri Rakitnici in 1953.
