= Blate =

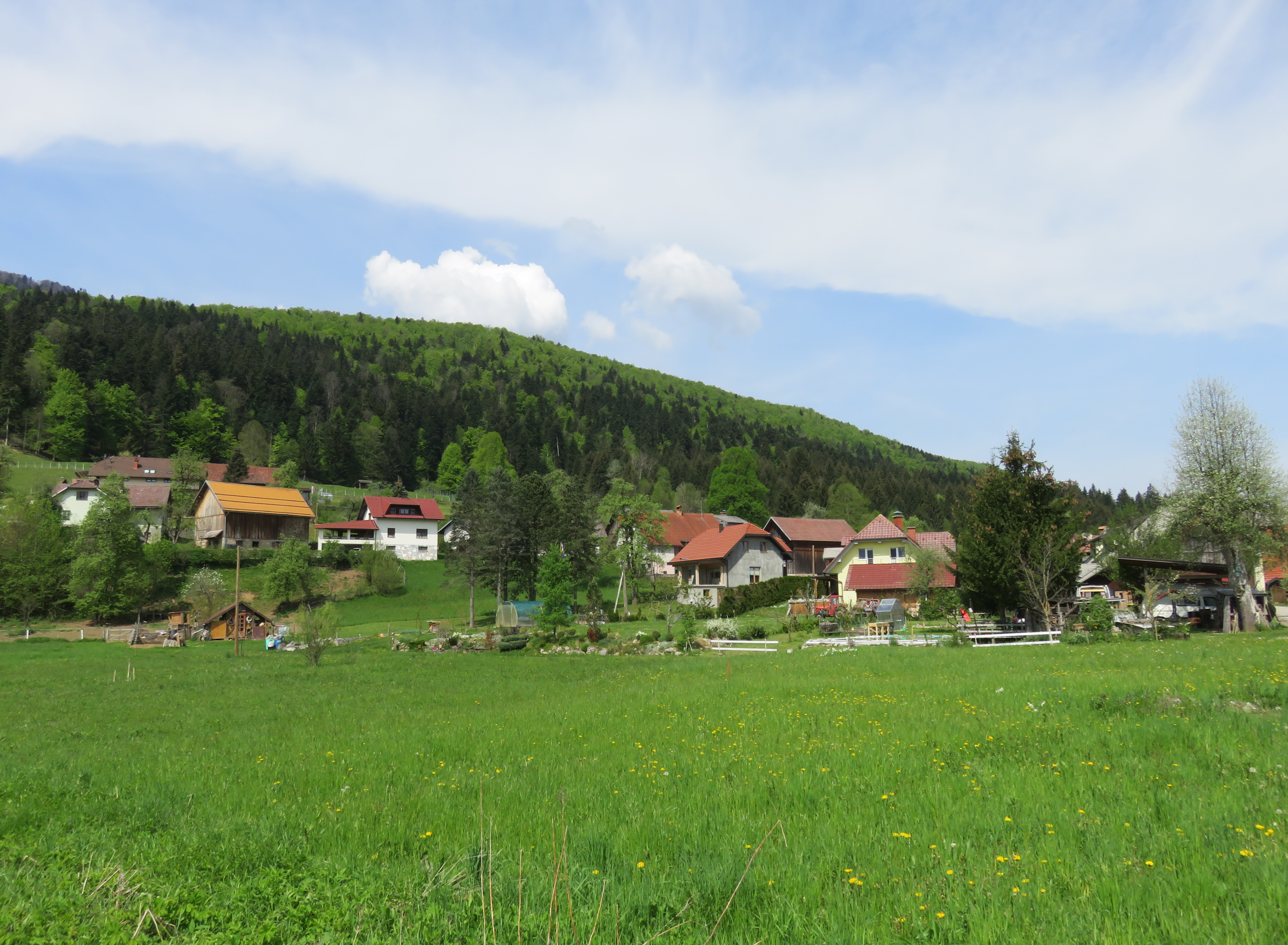

- Location in Slovenia
- Coordinates: 45°41′50.57″N 14°44′35.86″E
- Country: Slovenia
- Traditional region: Lower Carniola
- Statistical region: Southeast Slovenia
- Municipality: Ribnica

Area
  - Total: 0.58 km^{2} (0.22 sq mi)
- Elevation: 497.4 m (1,632 ft)

Population (2002)
  - Total: 59
- Postal code: 1331

Blate (pronounced [ˈblaːtɛ]) is a small settlement southwest of Dolenja Vas in the Municipality of Ribnica in southern Slovenia. The area is part of the traditional region of Lower Carniola and is now included in the Southeast Slovenia Statistical Region.
