= Junčje =

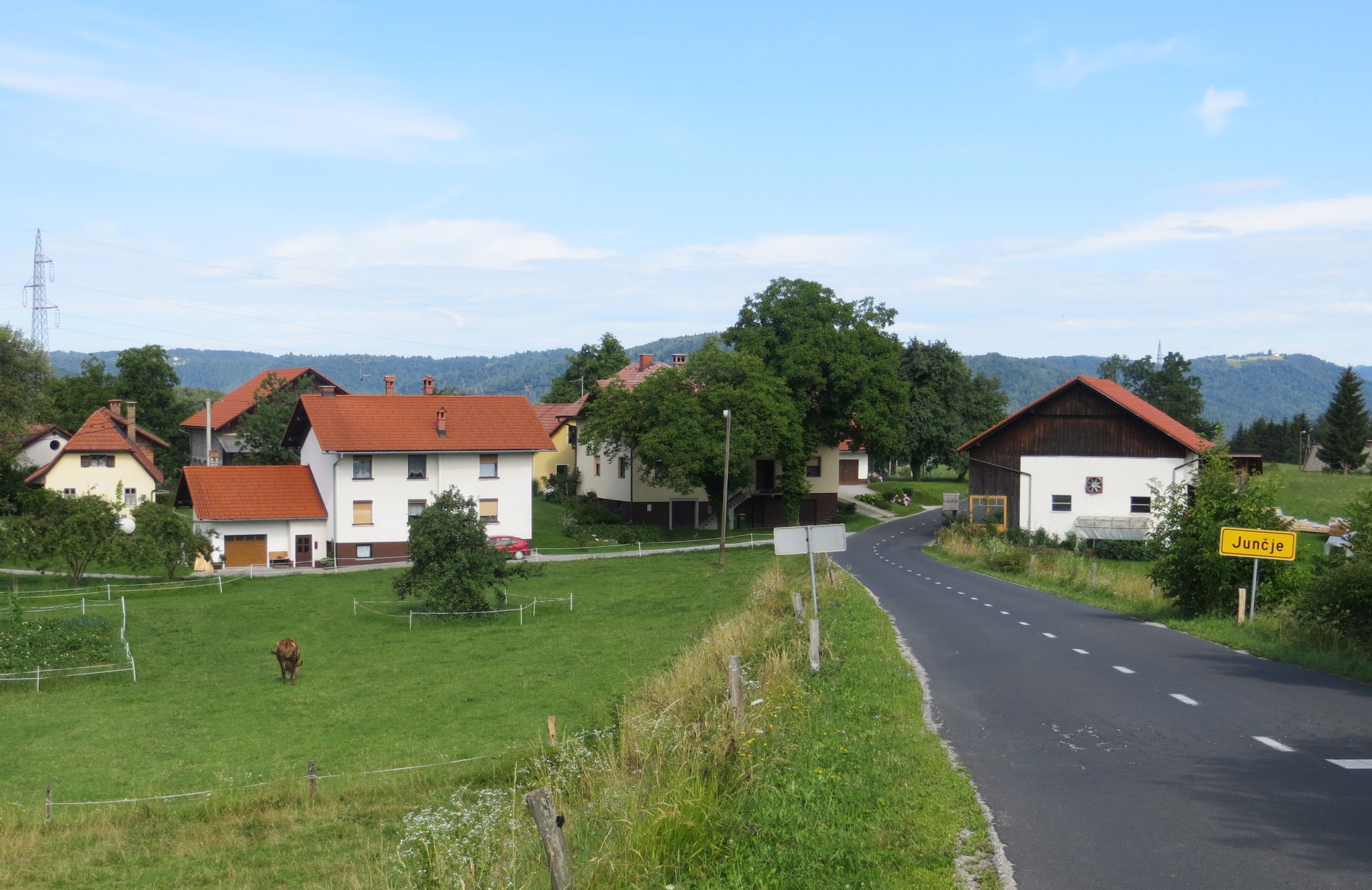

- Location in Slovenia
- Coordinates: 45°47′56.53″N 14°38′6.1″E
- Country: Slovenia
- Traditional region: Lower Carniola
- Statistical region: Southeast Slovenia
- Municipality: Ribnica

Area
  - Total: 0.31 km^{2} (0.12 sq mi)
- Elevation: 641.4 m (2,104 ft)

Population (2002)
  - Total: 22
- Postal code: 1315

Junčje (pronounced [ˈjuːntʃjɛ]) is a small settlement north of the village of Sveti Gregor in the Municipality of Ribnica in southern Slovenia. The area is part of the traditional region of Lower Carniola and is now included in the Southeast Slovenia Statistical Region.
