= Rigelj pri Ortneku =

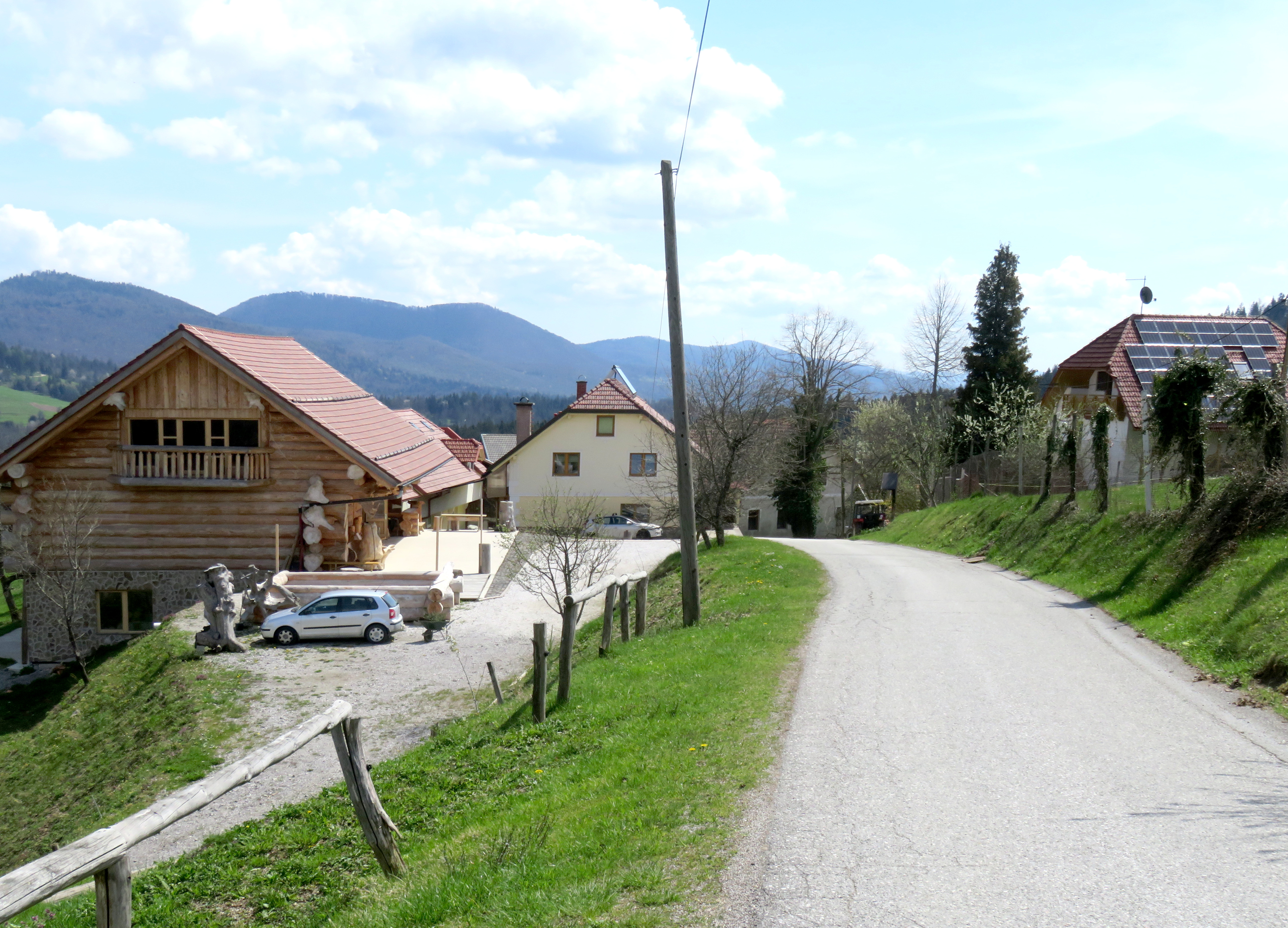

- Location in Slovenia
- Coordinates: 45°47′31.58″N 14°39′49.53″E
- Country: Slovenia
- Traditional region: Lower Carniola
- Statistical region: Southeast Slovenia
- Municipality: Ribnica

Area
  - Total: 0.57 km^{2} (0.22 sq mi)
- Elevation: 659 m (2,162 ft)

Population (2002)
  - Total: 10
- Postal code: 1316

Rigelj pri Ortneku (pronounced [ˈɾiːɡəl pɾi ɔɾˈtneːku]; German: Rigl) is a small settlement in the hills west of Ortnek in the Municipality of Ribnica in southern Slovenia. The entire Municipality of Ribnica is part of the traditional region of Lower Carniola and is included in the Southeast Slovenia Statistical Region.

== Name ==
The name of the settlement was changed from Rigelj to Rigelj pri Ortneku in 1953. In the past the German name was Rigl.
