= Kot pri Ribnici =

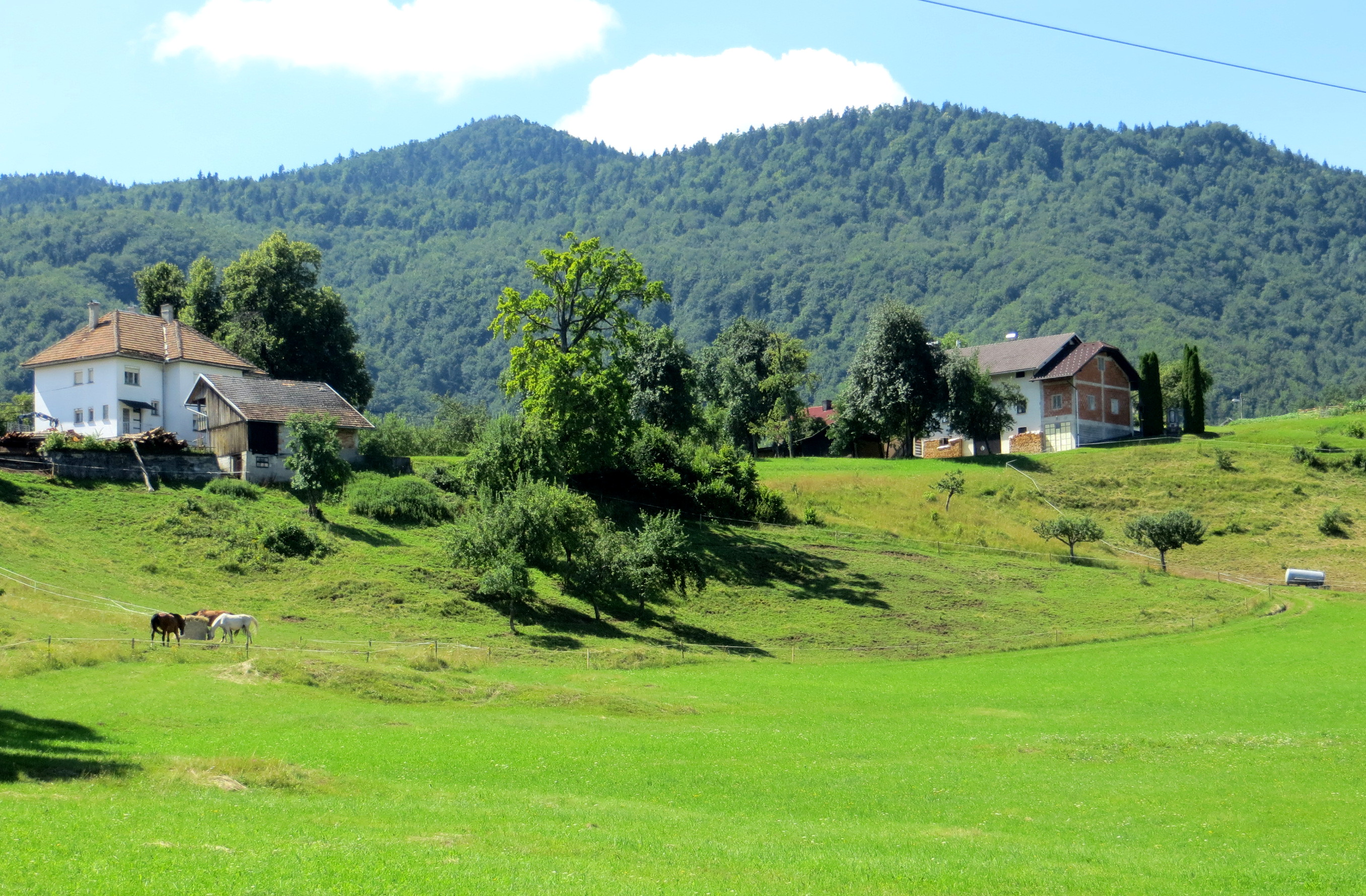

- Location in Slovenia
- Coordinates: 45°44′41.31″N 14°40′31.72″E
- Country: Slovenia
- Traditional region: Lower Carniola
- Statistical region: Southeast Slovenia
- Municipality: Ribnica

Area
  - Total: 5.33 km^{2} (2.06 sq mi)
- Elevation: 565.4 m (1,855 ft)

Population (2002)
  - Total: 127
- Postal code: 1310

Kot pri Ribnici (pronounced [ˈkoːt pɾi ˈɾiːbnitsi]; German: Winkel) is a settlement west of the town of Ribnica in the Municipality of Ribnica in southern Slovenia. The area is part of the traditional region of Lower Carniola and is now included in the Southeast Slovenia Statistical Region.

== Name ==
The name of the settlement was changed from Kot to Kot pri Ribnici in 1953.

== Cultural heritage ==
There is a small chapel-shrine in the settlement. It dates to the 19th century.
