= Levstiki =

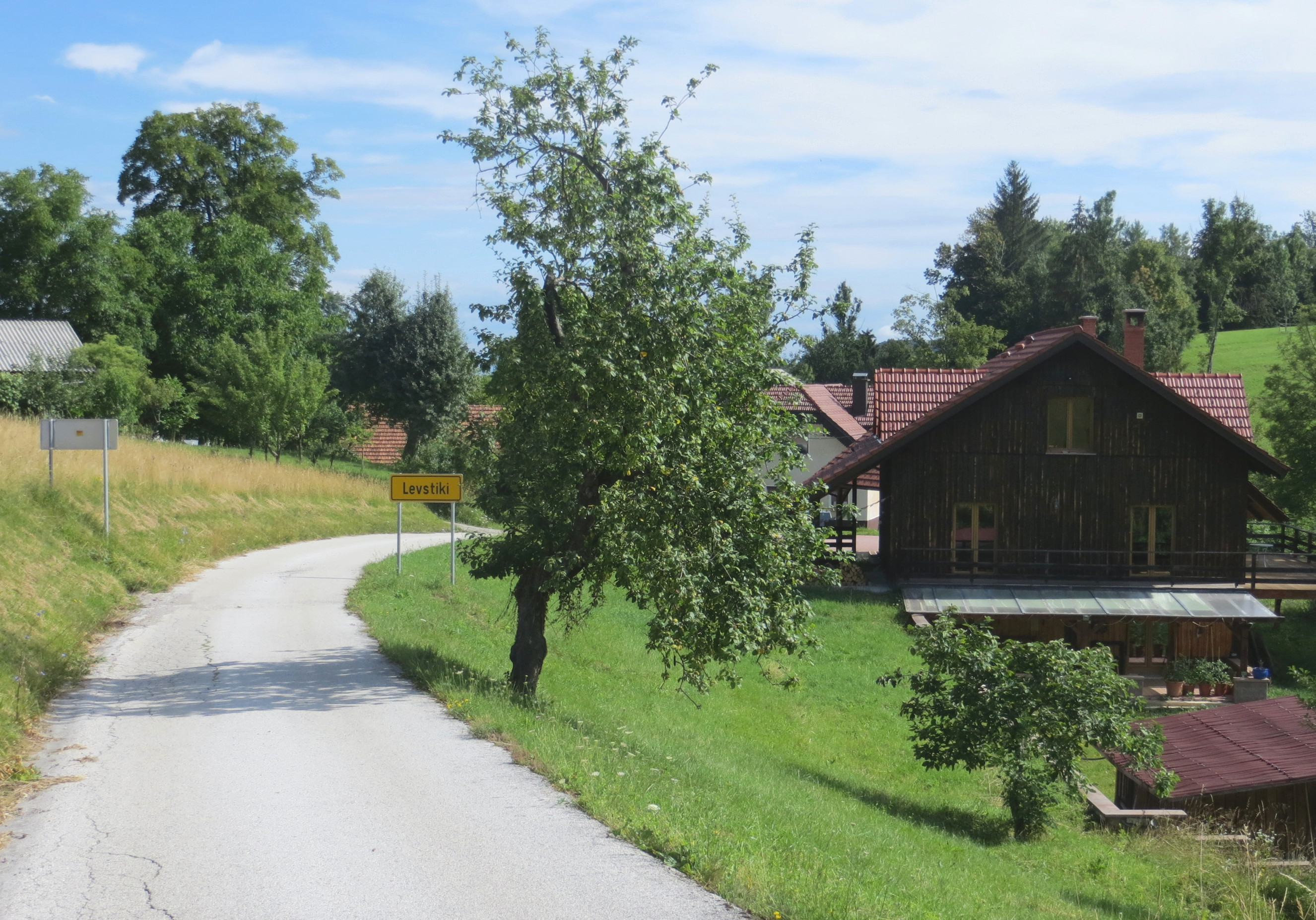

- Location in Slovenia
- Coordinates: 45°47′39.11″N 14°38′29.37″E
- Country: Slovenia
- Traditional region: Lower Carniola
- Statistical region: Southeast Slovenia
- Municipality: Ribnica

Area
  - Total: 0.65 km^{2} (0.25 sq mi)
- Elevation: 671.4 m (2,203 ft)

Population (2002)
  - Total: 8
- Postal code: 1316

Levstiki (pronounced [ˈleːu̯stiki]) is a small settlement in the Municipality of Ribnica in southern Slovenia. It lies north of the village of Sveti Gregor, just off the main road to Velike Lašče. The area is part of the traditional region of Lower Carniola and is now included in the Southeast Slovenia Statistical Region.
