= Gašpinovo =

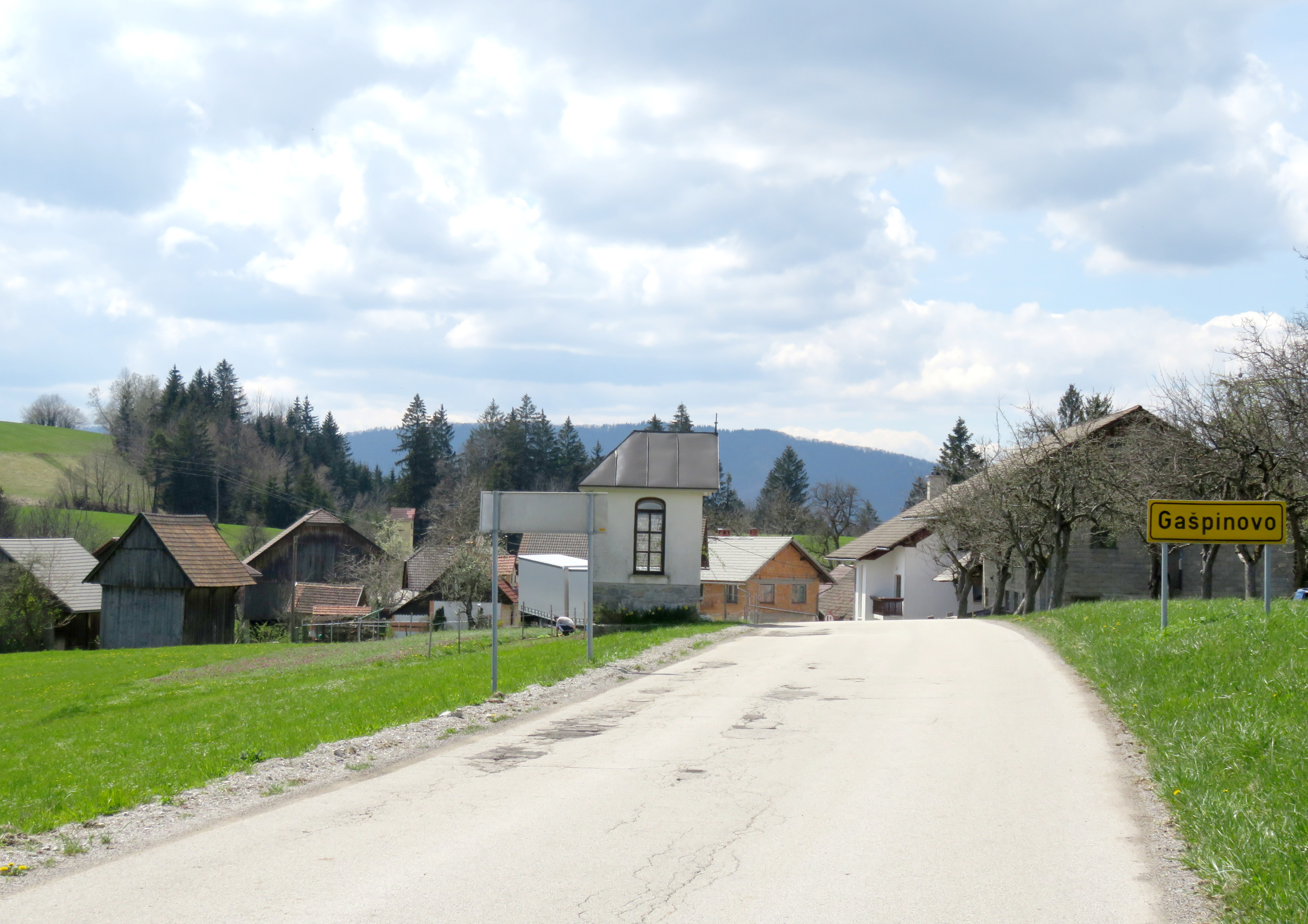

- Location in Slovenia
- Coordinates: 45°47′15.9″N 14°39′6.56″E
- Country: Slovenia
- Traditional region: Lower Carniola
- Statistical region: Southeast Slovenia
- Municipality: Ribnica

Area
  - Total: 0.43 km^{2} (0.17 sq mi)
- Elevation: 714.7 m (2,345 ft)

Population (2002)
  - Total: 11
- Postal code: 1316

Gašpinovo (pronounced [ɡaˈʃpiːnɔʋɔ]) is a small settlement west of Velike Poljane in the Municipality of Ribnica in southern Slovenia. The entire municipality is part of the traditional region of Lower Carniola and is now included in the Southeast Slovenia Statistical Region.
