= Pusti Hrib =

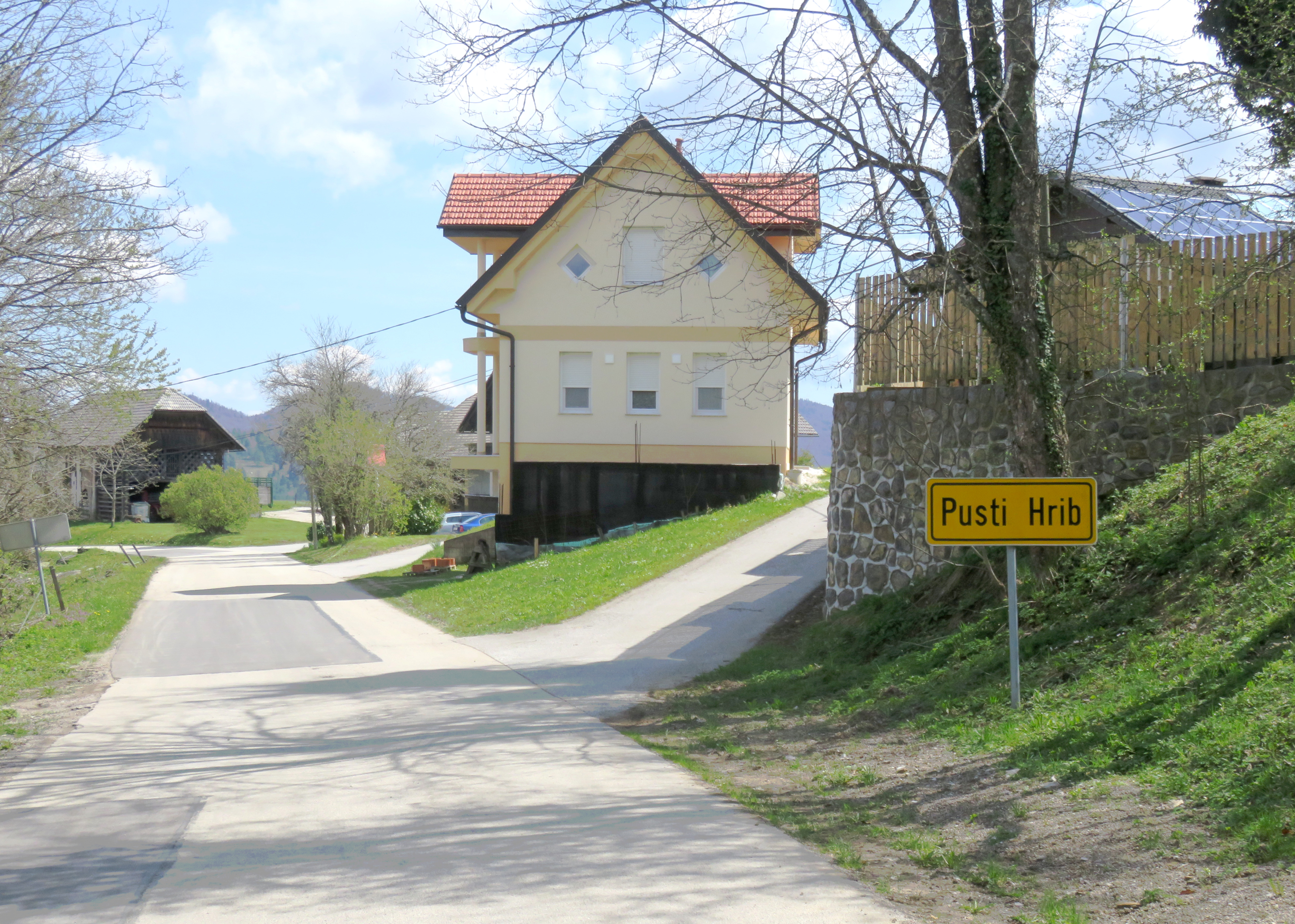

- Location in Slovenia
- Coordinates: 45°47′32.16″N 14°39′26.37″E
- Country: Slovenia
- Traditional region: Lower Carniola
- Statistical region: Southeast Slovenia
- Municipality: Ribnica

Area
  - Total: 0.75 km^{2} (0.29 sq mi)
- Elevation: 702.6 m (2,305 ft)

Population (2002)
  - Total: 11
- Postal code: 1316

Pusti Hrib (pronounced [ˈpuːsti ˈxɾiːp]) is a small settlement in the hills west of Ortnek in the Municipality of Ribnica in southern Slovenia. It lies on the main road from Ortnek to Sveti Gregor in the traditional region of Lower Carniola. It is included in the Southeast Slovenia Statistical Region.
