= Graben, Ribnica =

Graben
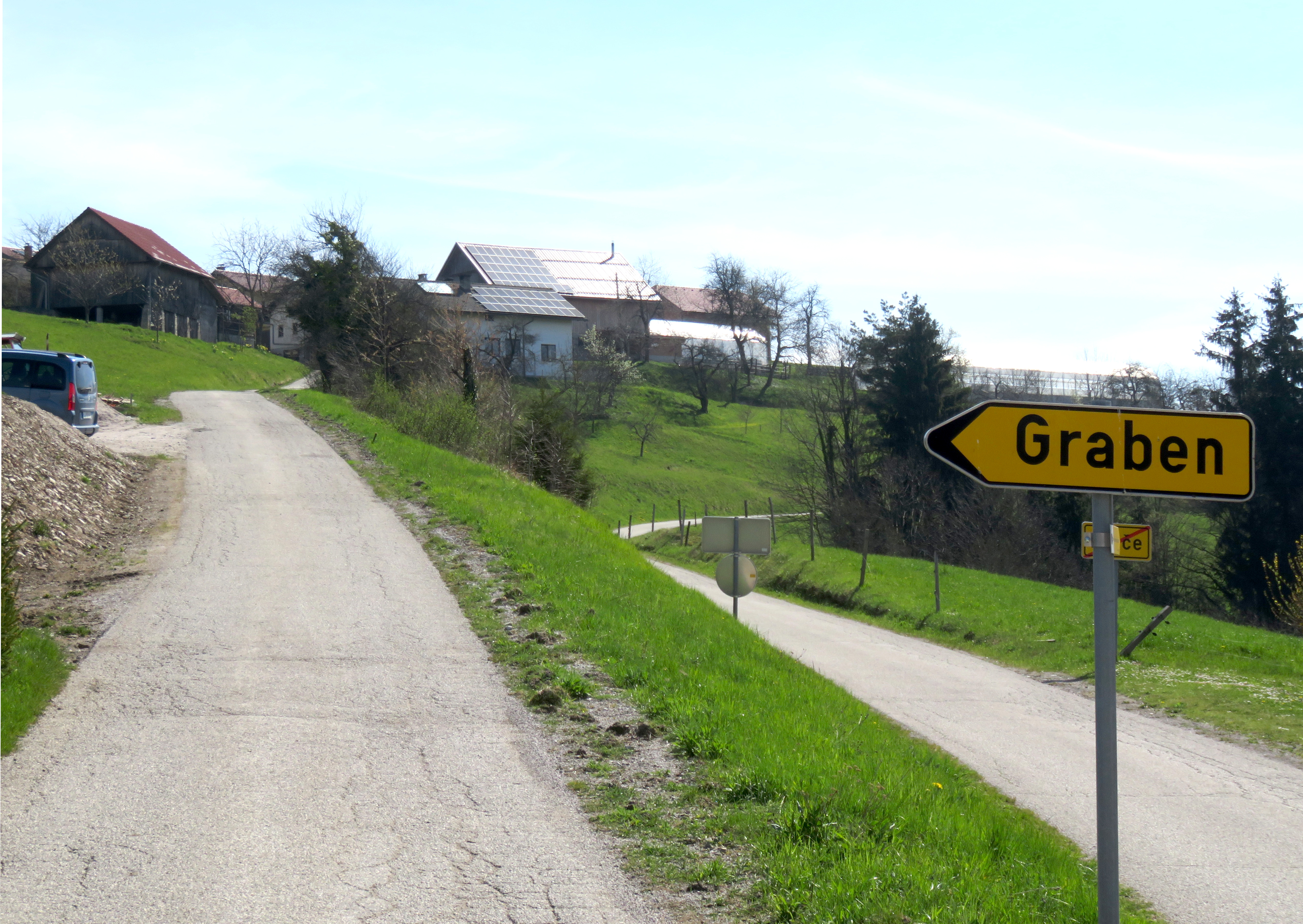

- Location in Slovenia
- Coordinates: 45°46′56.47″N 14°39′6.22″E
- Country: Slovenia
- Traditional region: Lower Carniola
- Statistical region: Southeast Slovenia
- Municipality: Ribnica

Area
  - Total: 0.66 km^{2} (0.25 sq mi)
- Elevation: 742.3 m (2,435 ft)

Population (2019)
  - Total: 17
- Postal code: 1316

Graben (pronounced [ˈɡɾaːbən]) is a small settlement in the Municipality of Ribnica in southern Slovenia. The area is part of the traditional region of Lower Carniola and is now included in the Southeast Slovenia Statistical Region.

After the Second World War, a Yugoslav labor camp for political prisoners operated in Graben.

A small roadside chapel-shrine in the southern outskirts of the settlement is dedicated to the Virgin Mary and was built in the second half of the 19th century.
