= Municipality of Ribnica =

Municipality of Slovenia

Municipality of Ribnica Občina Ribnica
- Municipality
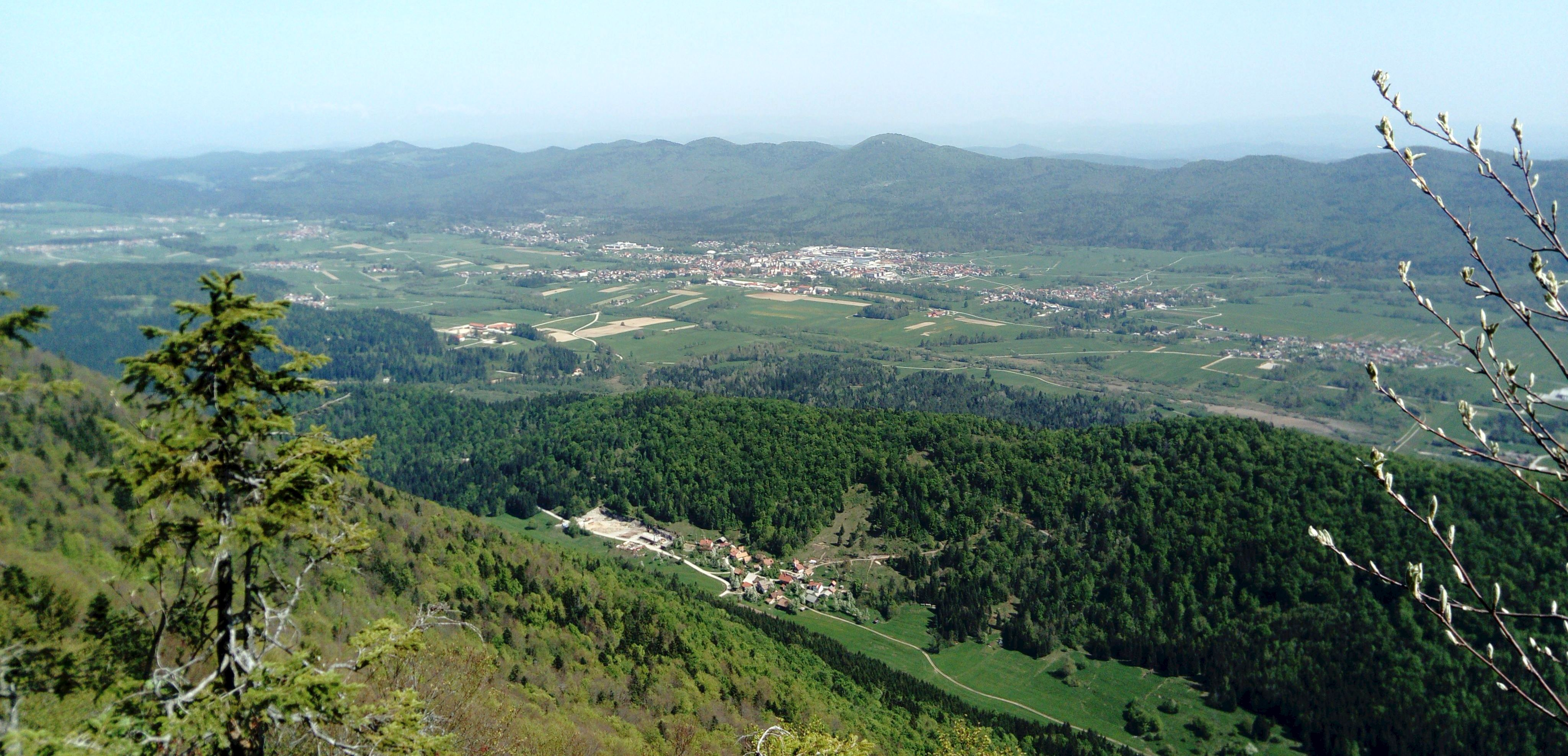

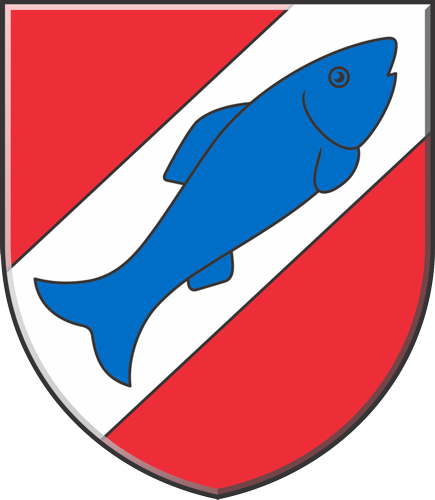
- Coat of arms

- Location of the Municipality of Ribnica in Slovenia
- Coordinates: 45°44′24″N 14°43′51″E
- Country: Slovenia

Government
  - Mayor: Samo Pogorelc

Area
  - Total: 153.6 km^{2} (59.3 sq mi)

Population (2002)
  - Total: 9,266
  - Density: 60.33/km^{2} (156.2/sq mi)
- Time zone: UTC+01 (CET)
  - Summer (DST): UTC+02 (CEST)
- Website: www.ribnica.si

The Municipality of Ribnica (pronounced [ˈɾiːbnitsa]; Slovene: Občina Ribnica) is a municipality in southern Slovenia. The seat of the municipality is the town of Ribnica. It is part of the traditional region of Lower Carniola and is now included in the Southeast Slovenia Statistical Region.

Archaeological evidence shows that the area has been settled at least since the late Bronze Age between 1300 and 900 BC.

== Settlements ==
In addition to the municipal seat of Ribnica, the municipality also includes the following settlements:

- Andol
- Blate
- Breg pri Ribnici na Dolenjskem
- Breže
- Brinovščica
- Bukovec pri Poljanah
- Bukovica
- Črnec
- Črni Potok pri Velikih Laščah
- Dane
- Dolenja Vas
- Dolenje Podpoljane
- Dolenji Lazi
- Dule
- Finkovo
- Gašpinovo
- Gorenje Podpoljane
- Gorenji Lazi
- Goriča Vas
- Graben
- Grčarice
- Grčarske Ravne
- Grebenje
- Grič
- Hojče
- Hrovača
- Hudi Konec
- Jelendol
- Jelenov Žleb
- Junčje
- Jurjevica
- Kot pri Rakitnici
- Kot pri Ribnici
- Krnče
- Levstiki
- Lipovec
- Makoše
- Marolče
- Maršiči
- Nemška Vas
- Ortnek
- Otavice
- Perovo
- Praproče
- Prigorica
- Pugled pri Karlovici
- Pusti Hrib
- Rakitnica
- Rigelj pri Ortneku
- Sajevec
- Škrajnek
- Slatnik
- Sušje
- Sveti Gregor
- Velike Poljane
- Vintarji
- Vrh pri Poljanah
- Zadniki
- Zadolje
- Zapuže pri Ribnici
- Zlati Rep
- Žlebič
- Žukovo

== Notable people ==
Notable people that were born or lived in the Municipality of Ribnica include:

- Bojan Adamič (1912–1995), composer (born in Ribnica)
- Jacobus Gallus (1550–1591), composer (presumed born in Ribnica)
- Janez Evangelist Krek (1865–1917), Christian social activist and politician (born in Sveti Gregor)
- France Prešeren (1800–1849), poet (studied in Ribnica)
- Simona Škrabec (born 1968), translator, essayist, and literary historian (spent her childhood in Ribnica)
- Ivan Šušteršič (1863–1925), conservative politician (born in Ribnica)
