= Hudi Konec =

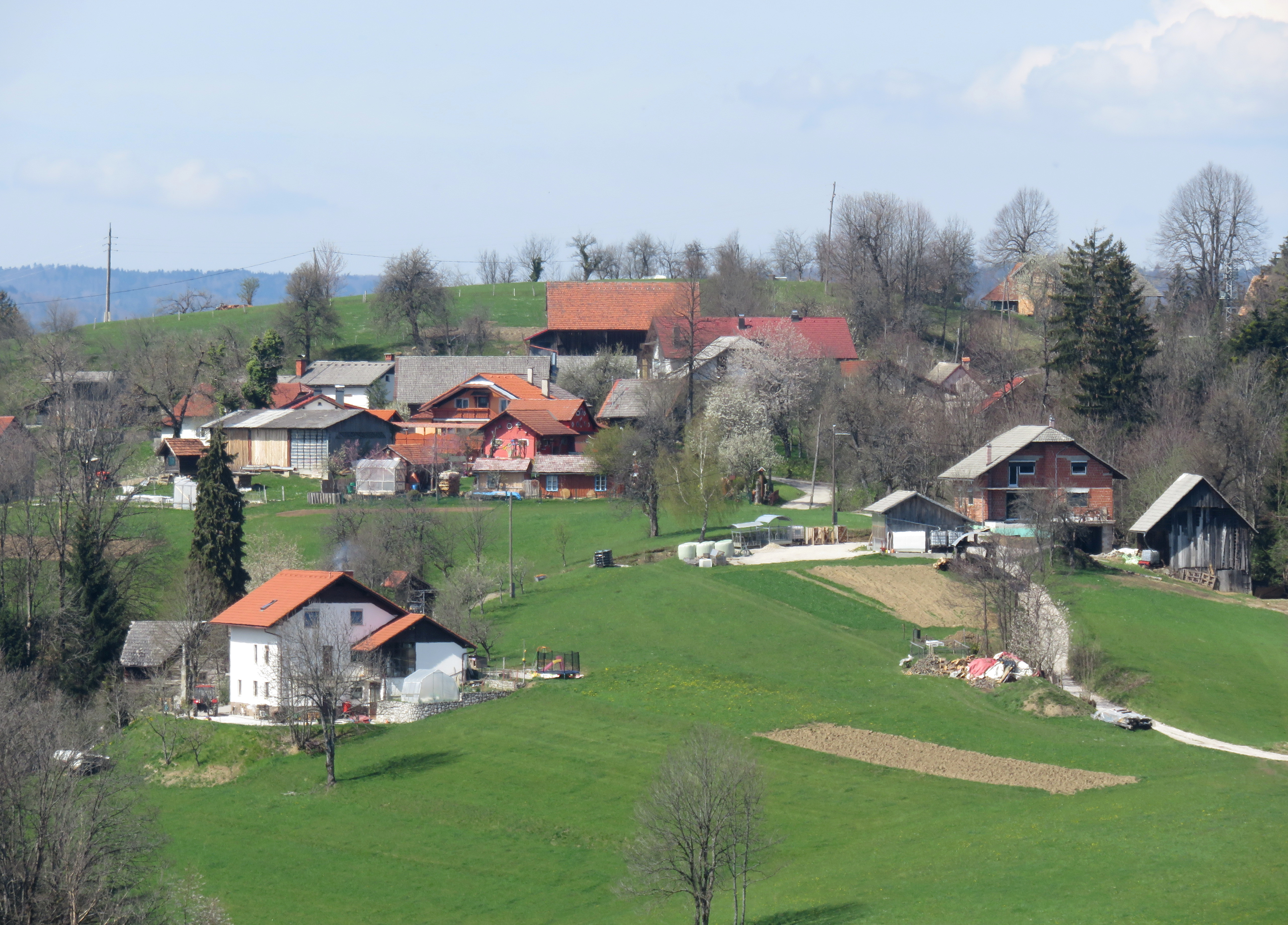

- Location in Slovenia
- Coordinates: 45°46′38.37″N 14°39′19.29″E
- Country: Slovenia
- Traditional region: Lower Carniola
- Statistical region: Southeast Slovenia
- Municipality: Ribnica

Area
  - Total: 0.67 km^{2} (0.26 sq mi)
- Elevation: 703.6 m (2,308 ft)

Population (2002)
  - Total: 35
- Postal code: 1316

Hudi Konec (pronounced [ˈxuːdi ˈkɔːnəts]) is a small settlement east of Sveti Gregor in the Municipality of Ribnica in southern Slovenia. The whole municipality is part of the traditional region of Lower Carniola and is now included in the Southeast Slovenia Statistical Region.
