= Zadolje =

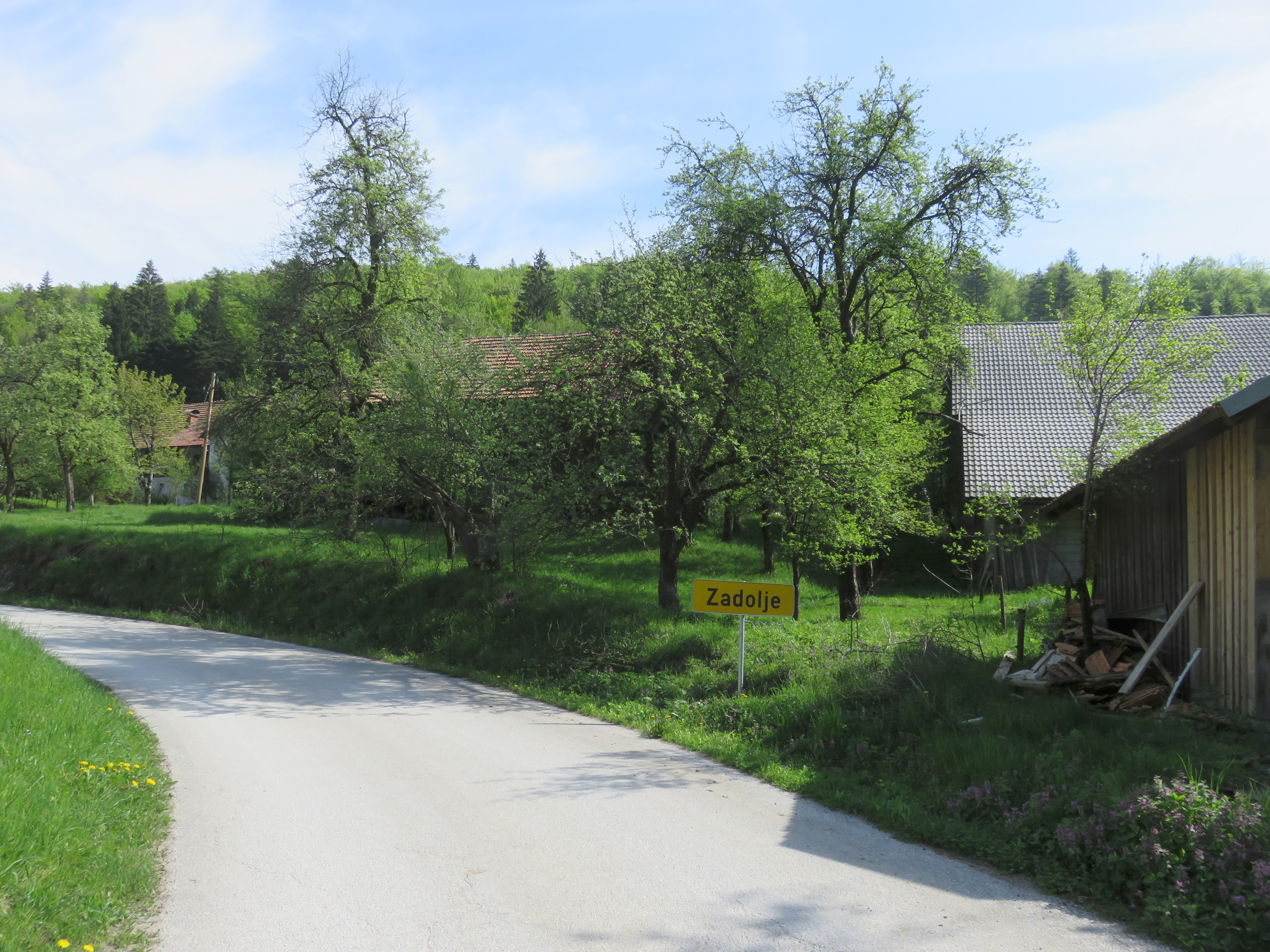

- Location in Slovenia
- Coordinates: 45°42′25.04″N 14°43′15.71″E
- Country: Slovenia
- Traditional region: Lower Carniola
- Statistical region: Southeast Slovenia
- Municipality: Ribnica

Area
  - Total: 5.91 km^{2} (2.28 sq mi)
- Elevation: 565.1 m (1,854 ft)

Population (2002)
  - Total: 16
- Postal code: 1310

Zadolje (pronounced [zaˈdoːljɛ]) is a village in the hills south of Ribnica in southern Slovenia. The area is part of the traditional region of Lower Carniola and is now included in the Southeast Slovenia Statistical Region.

== Chapel ==
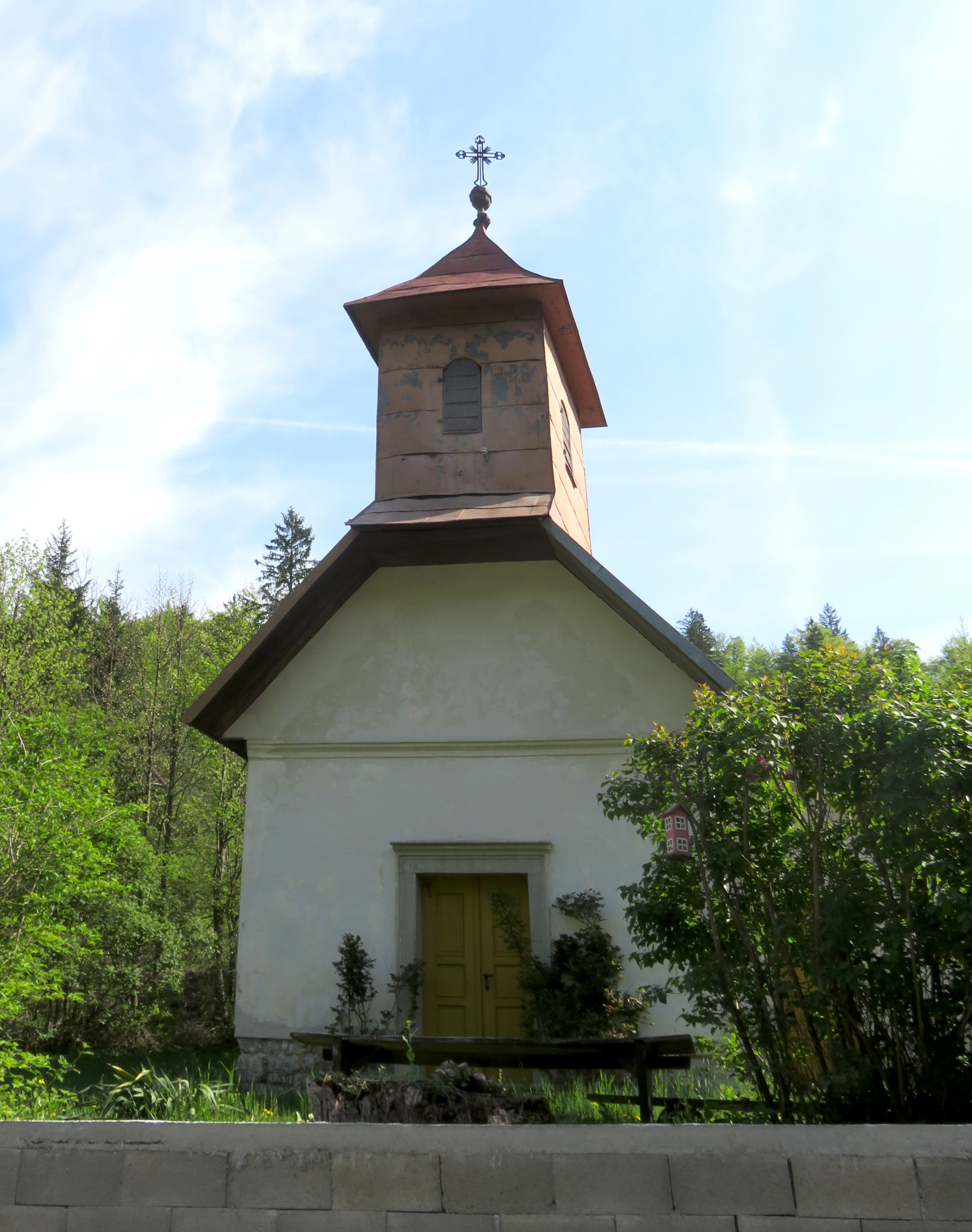
Saint Mary's Chapel

A small chapel in the settlement is dedicated to the Virgin Mary and was built in 1893.
