= Vintarji =

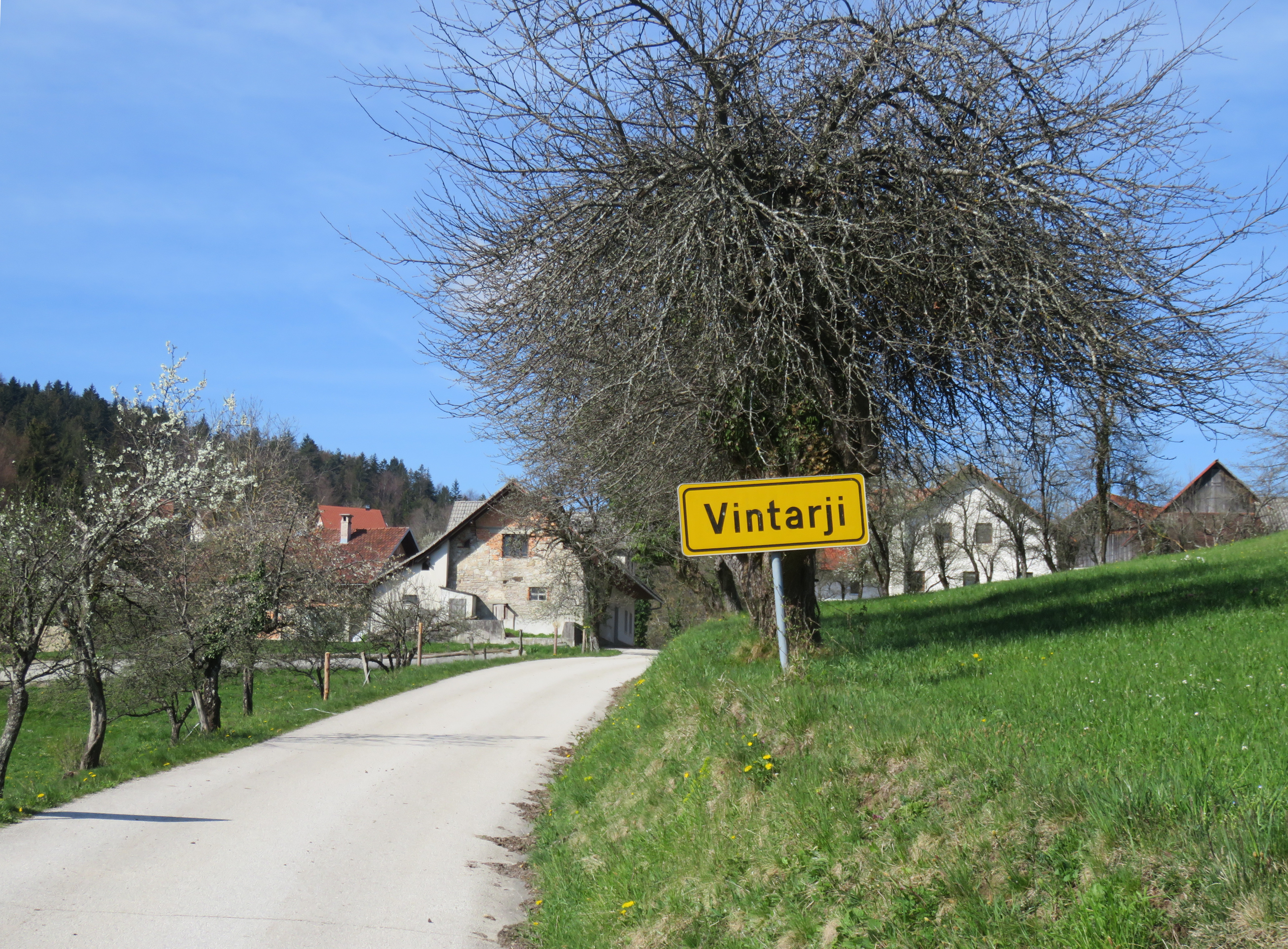

- Location in Slovenia
- Coordinates: 45°47′40.9″N 14°36′5.34″E
- Country: Slovenia
- Traditional region: Lower Carniola
- Statistical region: Southeast Slovenia
- Municipality: Ribnica

Area
  - Total: 1.24 km^{2} (0.48 sq mi)
- Elevation: 709.8 m (2,329 ft)

Population (2002)
  - Total: 17
- Postal code: 1315

Vintarji (pronounced [ˈʋiːntaɾji]) is a small settlement in the hills west of Sveti Gregor in the Municipality of Ribnica in southern Slovenia. The entire municipality lies in the traditional region of Lower Carniola and is now included in the Southeast Slovenia Statistical Region.

== Name ==
Vintarji was attested in historical sources as Wintter in 1436. The name Vintarji is a collective toponym, referring to a settlement where several people with the surname Vintar lived.
