= Zapuže pri Ribnici =

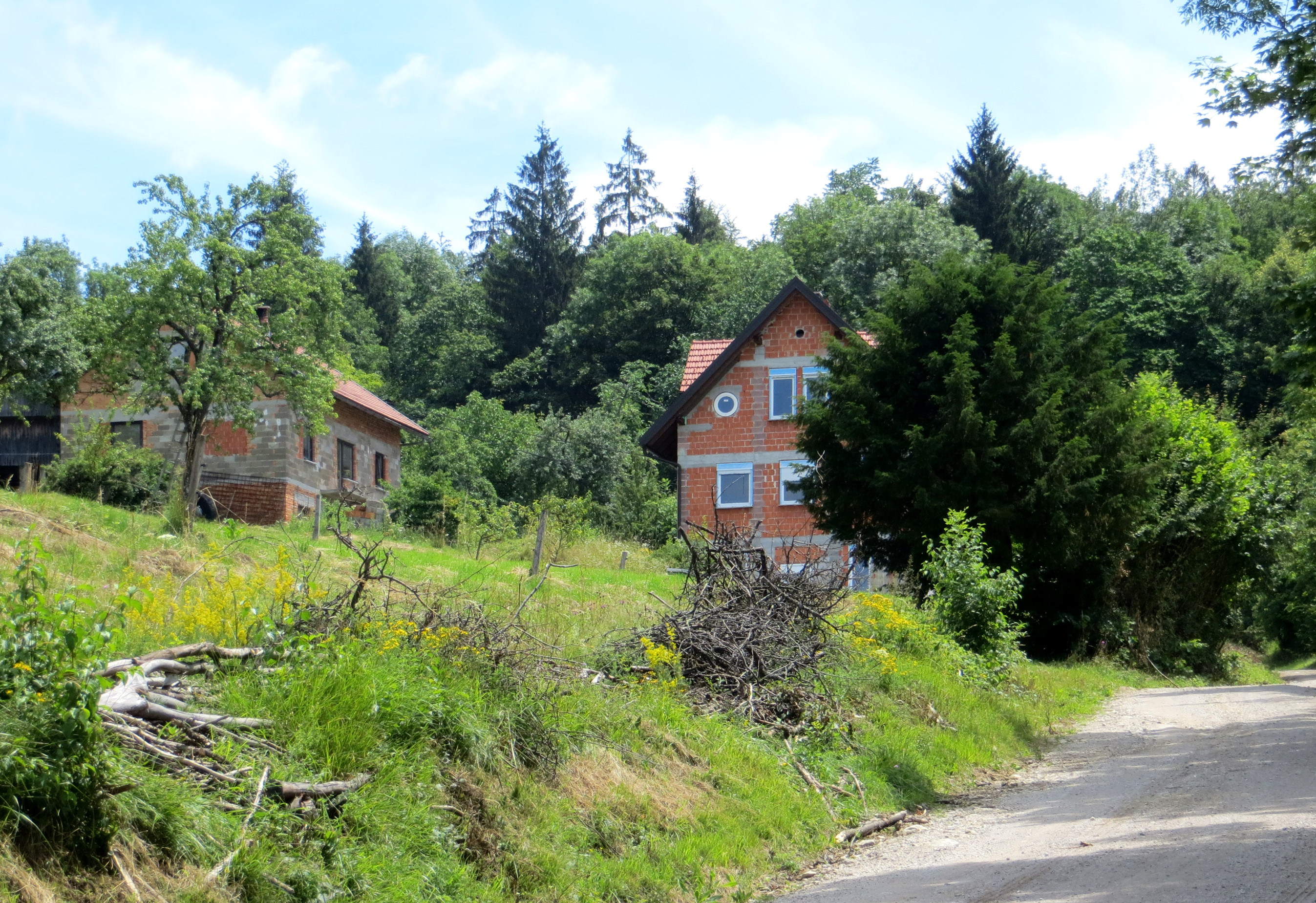

- Location in Slovenia
- Coordinates: 45°45′55.88″N 14°42′57.08″E
- Country: Slovenia
- Traditional region: Lower Carniola
- Statistical region: Southeast Slovenia
- Municipality: Ribnica

Area
  - Total: 9.4 km^{2} (3.6 sq mi)
- Elevation: 503.9 m (1,653 ft)

Population (2002)
  - Total: 18
- Postal code: 1310

Zapuže pri Ribnici (pronounced [ˈzaːpuʒɛ pɾi ˈɾiːbnitsi]) is a village in the hills north of Ribnica in southern Slovenia. The area is part of the traditional region of Lower Carniola and is now included in the Southeast Slovenia Statistical Region.

== Name ==
The name of the settlement was changed from Zapuže to Zapuže pri Ribnici in 1953.

== Church ==
A church built on the Little Mountains (Slovene: Mala gora) chain east of the village is dedicated to Saint Anne and belongs to the Parish of Ribnica. It was first mentioned in the written documents dating to 1576, but was rebuilt in 1623 and in the 19th century. Its main altar dates to 1889. The church is built on the site of a prehistoric structure. In the Middle Ages, the church was fortified to serve as a refuge during Ottoman attacks.
