= Finkovo =

- Location in Slovenia
- Coordinates: 45°48′44.9″N 14°40′29.39″E
- Country: Slovenia
- Traditional region: Lower Carniola
- Statistical region: Southeast Slovenia
- Municipality: Ribnica

Area
  - Total: 0.48 km^{2} (0.19 sq mi)
- Elevation: 611 m (2,005 ft)

Population (2002)
  - Total: 0
- Postal code: 1316

Finkovo (pronounced [ˈfiːŋkɔʋɔ]) is a small settlement north of Velike Poljane in the Municipality of Ribnica in southern Slovenia. It has only four houses and no longer has any permanent residents. The area is part of the traditional region of Lower Carniola and is now included in the Southeast Slovenia Statistical Region.
