= Dane, Ribnica =

Dane
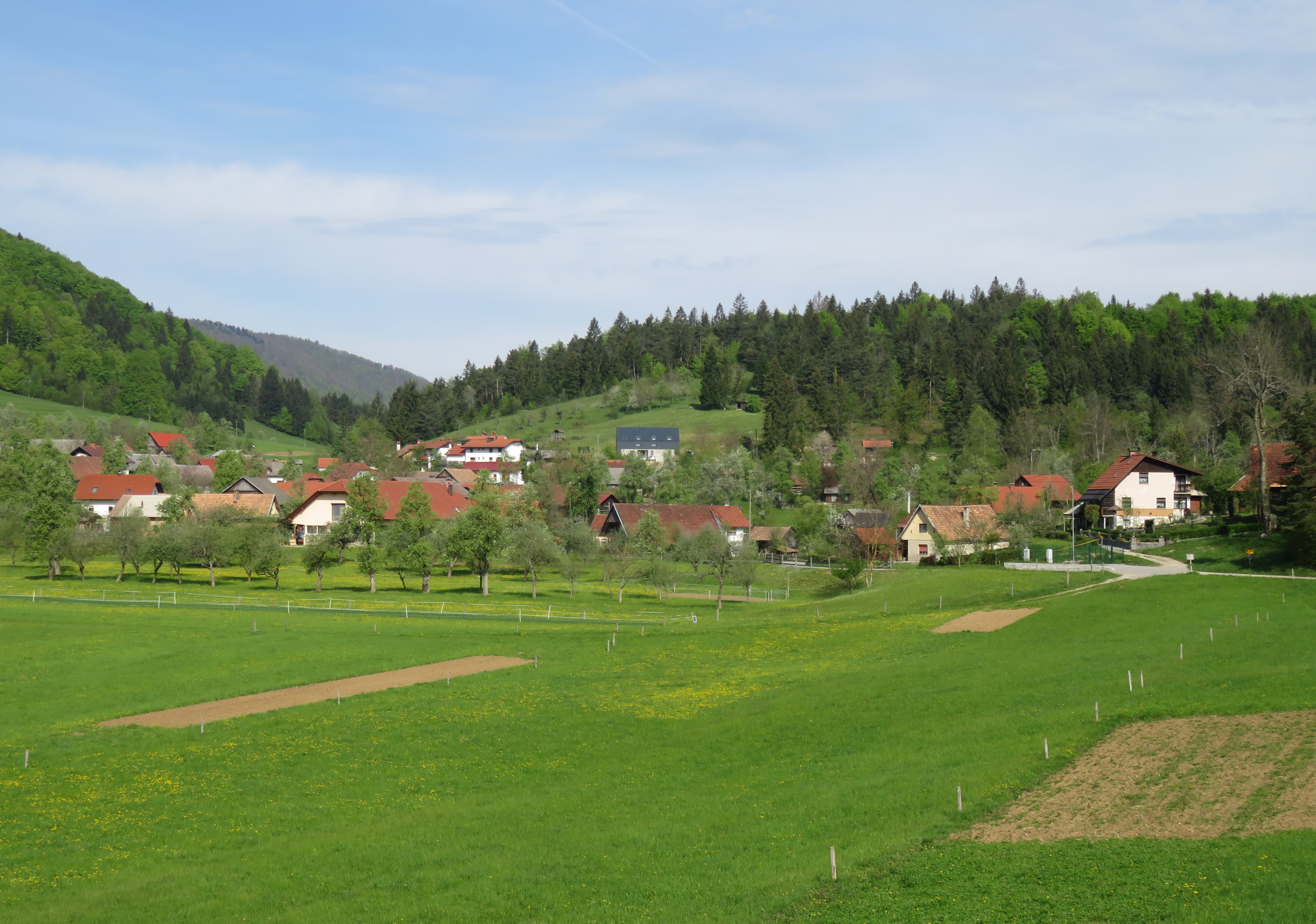

- Location in Slovenia
- Coordinates: 45°43′59.04″N 14°41′30.25″E
- Country: Slovenia
- Traditional region: Lower Carniola
- Statistical region: Southeast Slovenia
- Municipality: Ribnica

Area
  - Total: 2.33 km^{2} (0.90 sq mi)
- Elevation: 579.8 m (1,902 ft)

Population (2002)
  - Total: 59
- Postal code: 1310

Dane (pronounced [ˈdaːnɛ]) is a small village west of the town of Ribnica in southern Slovenia. The area is part of the traditional region of Lower Carniola and is now included in the Southeast Slovenia Statistical Region.

A small roadside chapel-shrine in the eastern part of the settlement dates to the 19th century.
