= Zlati Rep =

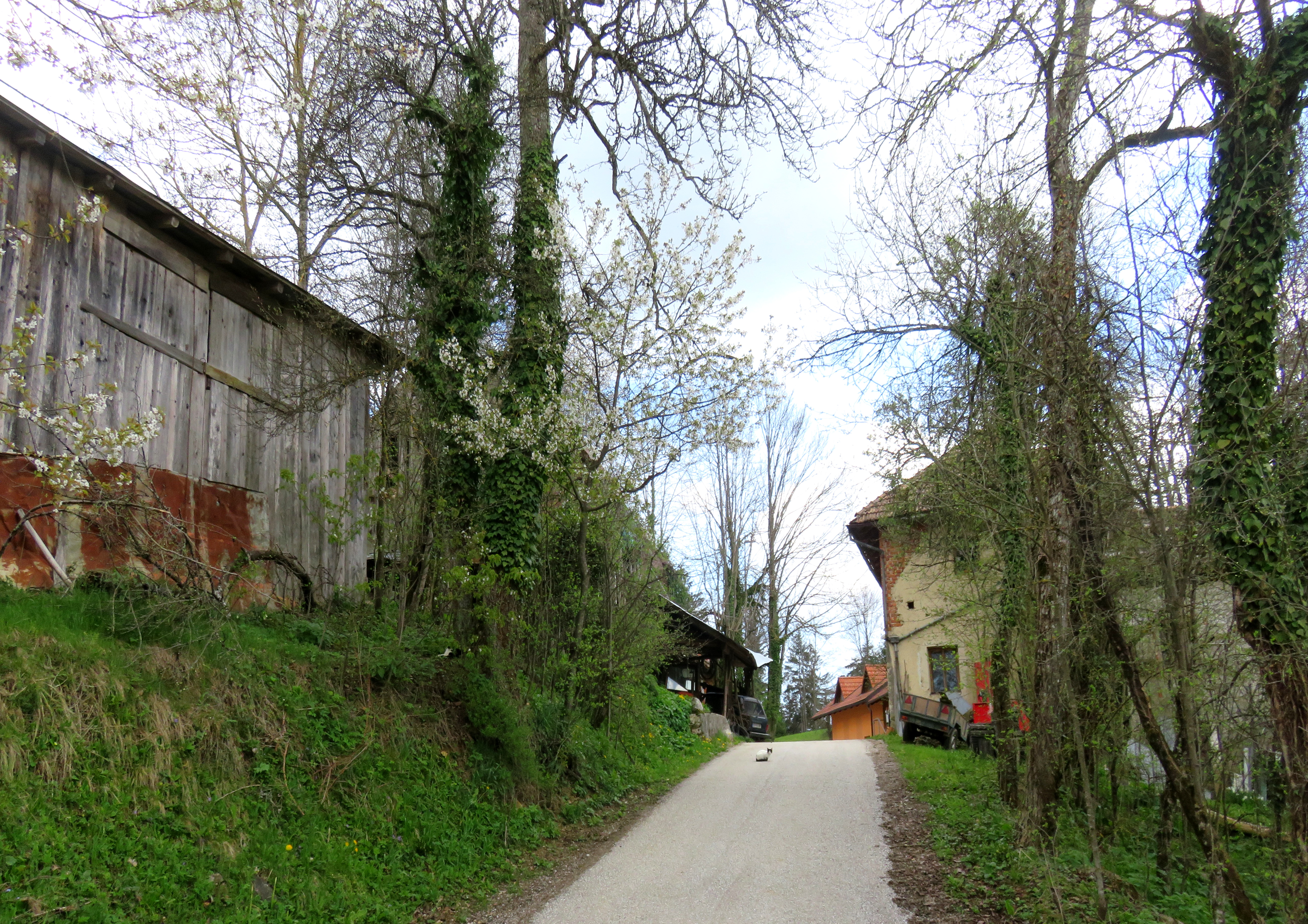

- Location in Slovenia
- Coordinates: 45°48′13.28″N 14°39′20.1″E
- Country: Slovenia
- Traditional region: Lower Carniola
- Statistical region: Southeast Slovenia
- Municipality: Ribnica

Area
  - Total: 0.40 km^{2} (0.15 sq mi)
- Elevation: 645.8 m (2,119 ft)

Population (2002)
  - Total: 12
- Postal code: 1318

Zlati Rep (pronounced [ˈzlaːti ˈɾeːp]) is a small settlement in the Municipality of Ribnica in southern Slovenia. It is part of the traditional region of Lower Carniola and is included in the Southeast Slovenia Statistical Region.
