= Sušje, Ribnica =

Sušje
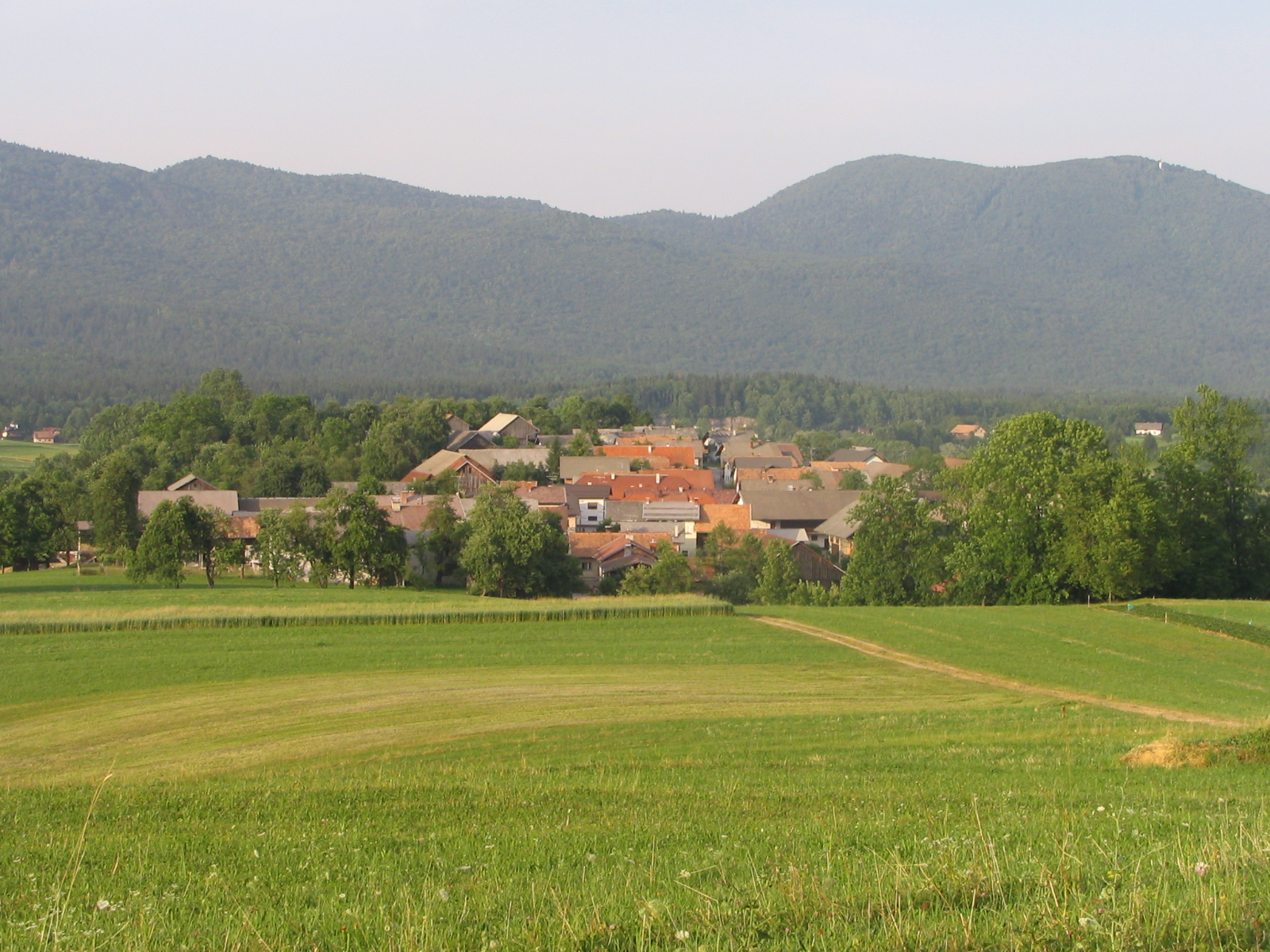

- Location in Slovenia
- Coordinates: 45°45′31.63″N 14°41′12.15″E
- Country: Slovenia
- Traditional region: Lower Carniola
- Statistical region: Southeast Slovenia
- Municipality: Ribnica

Area
  - Total: 1.17 km^{2} (0.45 sq mi)
- Elevation: 531.8 m (1,745 ft)

Population (2002)
  - Total: 136
- Postal code: 1310

Sušje (pronounced [ˈsuːʃjɛ]; German: Suschje) is a village in the Municipality of Ribnica in southern Slovenia. The area is part of the traditional region of Lower Carniola and is now included in the Southeast Slovenia Statistical Region.

There is a small roadside chapel-shrine in the settlement, dedicated to the Our Lady of Lourdes. It was built in the late 19th century in the Neo-Gothic style.
