= Breže, Ribnica =

Breže
- Location in Slovenia
- Coordinates: 45°45′16.54″N 14°42′1.29″E
- Country: Slovenia
- Traditional region: Lower Carniola
- Statistical region: Southeast Slovenia
- Municipality: Ribnica

Area
  - Total: 2.89 km^{2} (1.12 sq mi)
- Elevation: 532.9 m (1,748 ft)

Population (2002)
  - Total: 156
- Postal code: 1310

Breže (pronounced [ˈbɾeːʒɛ]; German: Friesach) is a settlement in the Municipality of Ribnica in southern Slovenia. The area is part of the traditional region of Lower Carniola and is now included in the Southeast Slovenia Statistical Region.

== Name ==
Breže was attested in written sources as Vreisach in 1220 and Friesach in 1405, among other spellings.
