= Breg pri Ribnici na Dolenjskem =

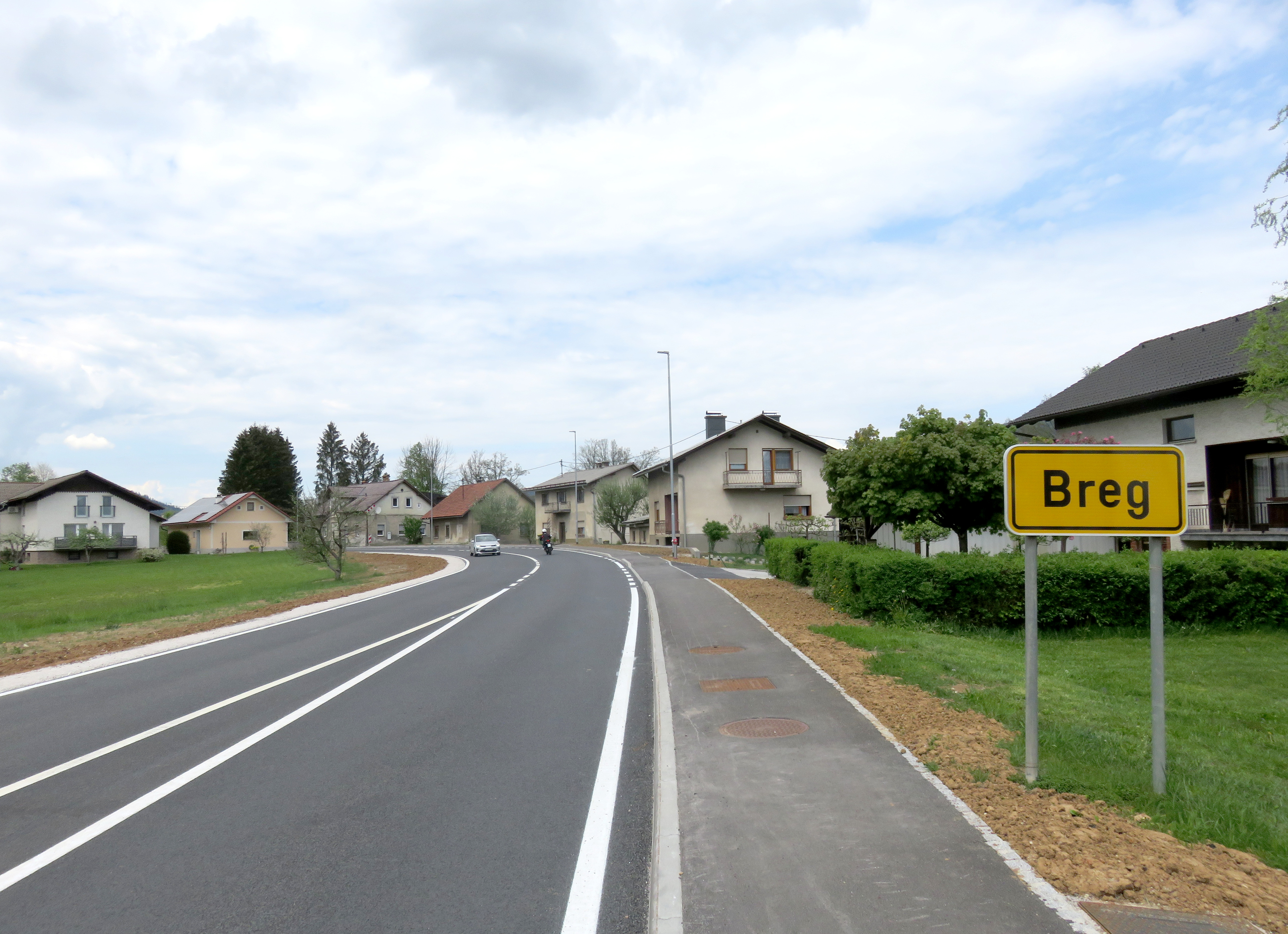

- Location in Slovenia
- Coordinates: 45°45′6.97″N 14°42′59.64″E
- Country: Slovenia
- Traditional region: Lower Carniola
- Statistical region: Southeast Slovenia
- Municipality: Ribnica

Area
  - Total: 0.74 km^{2} (0.29 sq mi)
- Elevation: 498.2 m (1,635 ft)

Population (2002)
  - Total: 236
- Postal code: 1310

Breg pri Ribnici na Dolenjskem (pronounced [ˈbɾeːk pɾi ˈɾiːbnitsi]; German: Willingrain) is a settlement northwest of the town of Ribnica in southern Slovenia. The area is part of the traditional region of Lower Carniola and is now included in the Southeast Slovenia Statistical Region.

== Name ==
Breg pri Ribnici na Dolenjskem was attested in written sources as Williginrain in 1241 and Willigem Rain in 1340, among other spellings. The name of the settlement was changed from Breg to Breg pri Ribnici na Dolenjskem in 1953. In the past the German name was Willingrain.

== Castle ==
Very little remains of the castle that used to dominate the southern end of the settlement. It is first mentioned as an estate in written documents dating to 1241. The castle itself was built in the mid 15th century. By 1810 it was in a very dilapidated state and building material from the castle was used in contemporary buildings in Ribnica.
