= Grčarice =

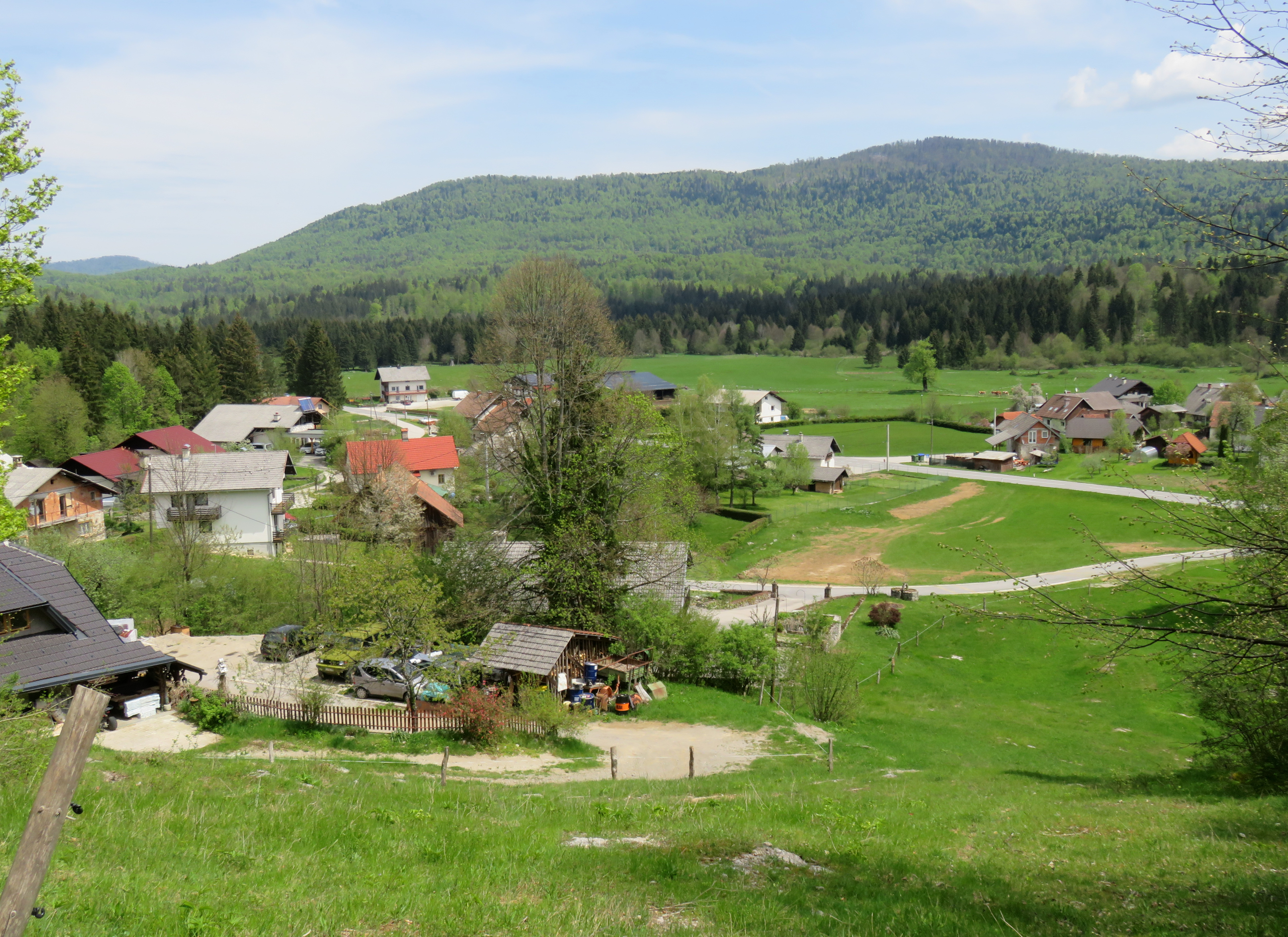

- Location in Slovenia
- Coordinates: 45°39′5.78″N 14°45′20.02″E
- Country: Slovenia
- Traditional region: Lower Carniola
- Statistical region: Southeast Slovenia
- Municipality: Ribnica

Area
  - Total: 8.19 km^{2} (3.16 sq mi)
- Elevation: 519.1 m (1,703 ft)

Population (2002)
  - Total: 166
- Postal code: 1311

Grčarice (pronounced [ˈɡəɾtʃaɾitsɛ]; locally also Grčav(i)ce, in older sources also Gerčarice, German: Masern, Gottscheerish: Masharə) is a village in the Municipality of Ribnica in southern Slovenia. The area is part of the traditional region of Lower Carniola and is now included in the Southeast Slovenia Statistical Region.

== Name ==
Grčarice was first attested in written sources in 1498 as Masern. The German name Masern is derived from the Old High German root maser 'knotty growth on a tree'. This semantically corresponds to the Slovene root grča 'knot', which may be the basis of the Slovene name Grčarice. Other theories of the origin of the Slovene name are that it is based on the surname Grčar, in turn derived from the Slovene common noun grča (in the sense of 'clod, clump', among many other meanings), or that it is derived from grnčar 'potter', implying that the village was settled by potters.

== History ==
Grčarice was a Gottschee German village. In the land registry of 1574 it had six full farms divided into 12 half-farms, corresponding to a population between 50 and 60. The village of Brunn bei Masern, also attested in 1574, may have been absorbed into Grčarice soon thereafter or may have become the nearby village of Mrzli Potok. Countess Elizabeth von Blagay granted additional territory to Grčarice for settlement in 1613 because of overpopulation. In the 1770 census there were 28 houses in the village. On 24 July 1882 a major fire started in Johann Sbačnik's (= Sbaschnig, Zbačnik) threshing room at Grčarice no. 28. The fire spread and burned down 15 houses and 41 outbuildings in the village, but no livestock were lost and there were no human fatalities. The village church was also damaged in the fire. A school was established in Grčarice in 1883, when a businessman named Stampfl purchased a house and donated it for this purpose. The school operated until 1941. Before World War II, Grčarice had 61 houses and a population of 256. During this time the local economy was based on agriculture, timber transport, peddling, and the local steam-powered sawmill. Beekeeping was also practiced in the village. There was a store in the village and an inn that offered overnight accommodation. The original inhabitants were evicted in the fall of 1941. From 8 to 10 September 1943 there was a battle at Grčarice between Slovenian Chetnik forces and the Partisan Šercer Brigade (Slovene: 2. slovenska narodnoosvobodilna udarna brigada »Ljubo Šercer«). After World War II, settlers moved to the village from Glažuta and Loški Potok. Agriculture was largely abandoned in the village, with only some small-scale potato cultivation and raising of cattle and pigs. Most of the population lived as forestry workers involved in cutting and transporting timber, or commuted to work in Ribnica or Prigorica. Some of them gathered nightshade and linden blossoms for the local angling club. Two beekeepers were active in the village after the war.

== Church ==
- The church in Grčarice was dedicated to Saints Primus and Felician. It originally belonged to the proto-parish of Ribnica, obtained an independent prebendary in 1767, and became a parish in its own right in 1878. A bell tower was added to the church in 1845. The building was damaged in 1943 and its ruins were removed in 1949.

== Other cultural heritage ==
- The cemetery in Grčarice was established in 1838 and served the villages of Grčarice, Grčarske Ravne, Jelendol, and Glažuta. It stands south of the settlement and formerly contained a large number of Gottschee German tombstones. In 1966 all of the German tombstones were removed from the cemetery. The cemetery contains three Partisan graves where 20 unknown Partisan soldiers are buried.
- There is a plaque on the management building of the collective farm and forestry company (at Grčarice 24) commemorating the events of the Second World War. The plaque was unveiled in 1963. There is also a plaque on the local arts center with the names of Partisan soldiers killed in the war.
