= Jelendol =

Jelendol is a Slovene place name that may refer to:

Places

- Jelendol, Ribnica, a village in the Municipality of Ribnica, southern Slovenia
- Jelendol, Škocjan, a village in the Municipality of Škocjan, southeastern Slovenia
- Jelendol, Tržič, a village in the Municipality of Tržič, northwestern Slovenia

Buildings

- Jelendol Partisan Hospital, a hospital built by the Slovene resistance forces in World War II in the forests of the Kočevje Rog
