= Jelenov Žleb =

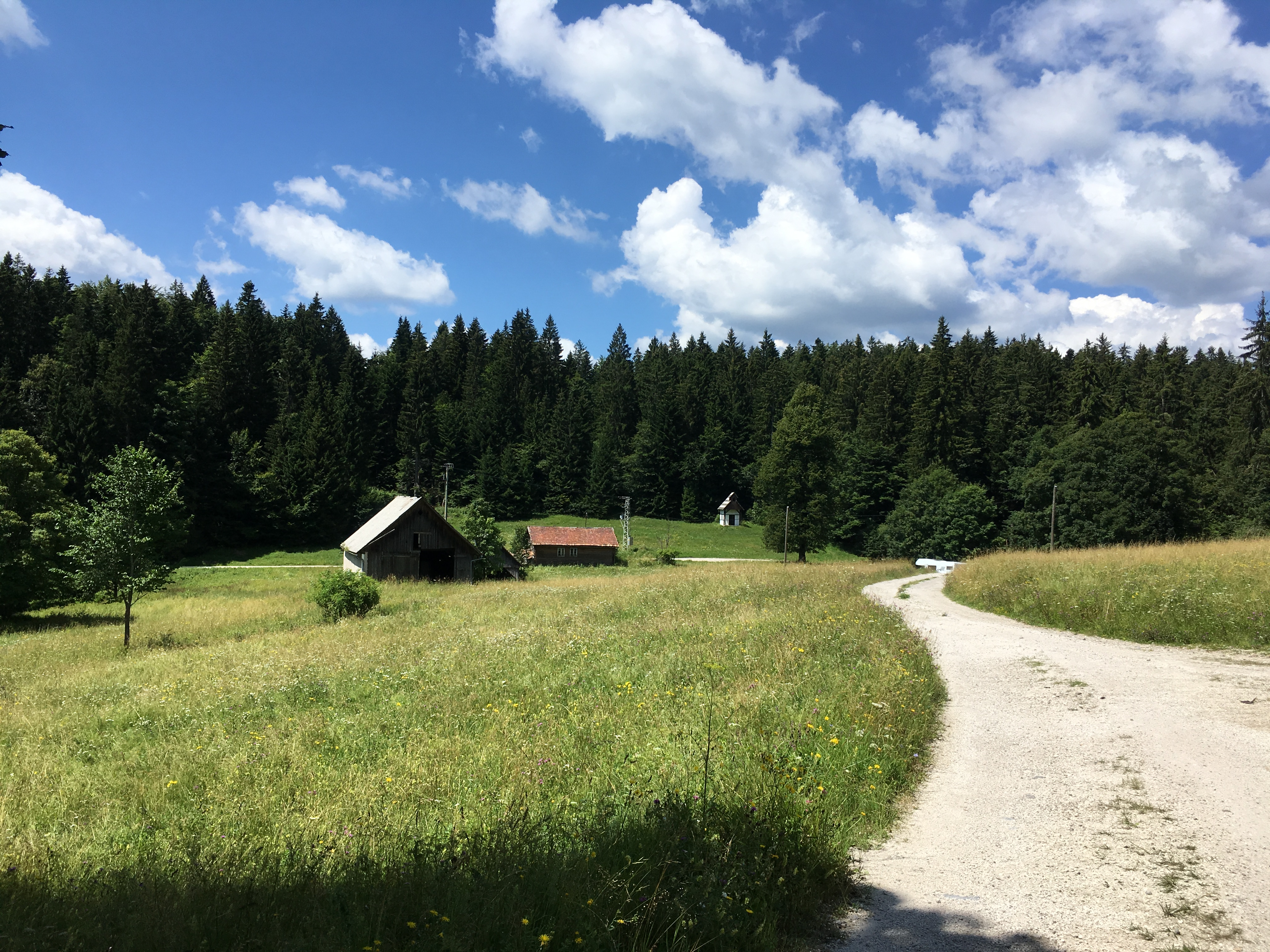

- Location in Slovenia
- Coordinates: 45°42′10.06″N 14°40′39.06″E
- Country: Slovenia
- Traditional region: Lower Carniola
- Statistical region: Southeast Slovenia
- Municipality: Ribnica

Area
  - Total: 15.55 km^{2} (6.00 sq mi)
- Elevation: 1,015.3 m (3,331 ft)

Population (2002)
  - Total: 0
- Postal code: 1310

Jelenov Žleb (pronounced [jɛˈleːnou̯ ˈʒleːp]; German: Mathildensruhe) is a small remote settlement in the hills south of Ribnica in southern Slovenia. It no longer has any permanent residents, but is used seasonally by local forest workers. The area is part of the traditional region of Lower Carniola and is now included in the Southeast Slovenia Statistical Region.

== History ==
=== World War II ===
The vicinity of the settlement was the site of a well-known engagement between the Slovene Partisans and Italian forces. In the early morning hours of March 26, 1943, two Partisan brigades were moving from near Kočevje towards Loški Potok when they were surprised by the passing battalion of the Macerata Division, which was preparing an ambush as a part of a plan to destroy the Partisans of the region. Three hundred sixty Partisans fought around 480 Italian soldiers and forced them to retreat. There were 106 killed and 102 injured soldiers on the Italian side, and the Partisan side had five dead and 20 injured.

==== Mass grave ====
The Jelenov Žleb Shaft Mass Grave (Slovene: Grobišče Brezno v Jelenovem Žlebu) is located southwest of the settlement, along the road to Glažuta. It contains the remains of a number of Italian soldiers killed in the aforementioned battle.

== Chapel ==
A small chapel in the settlement is dedicated to Saint Anthony the Hermit and belongs to the Parish of Ribnica. It has a wooden belfry. It was built in 1906 and renovated in 1996.
