= Gornje Retje =

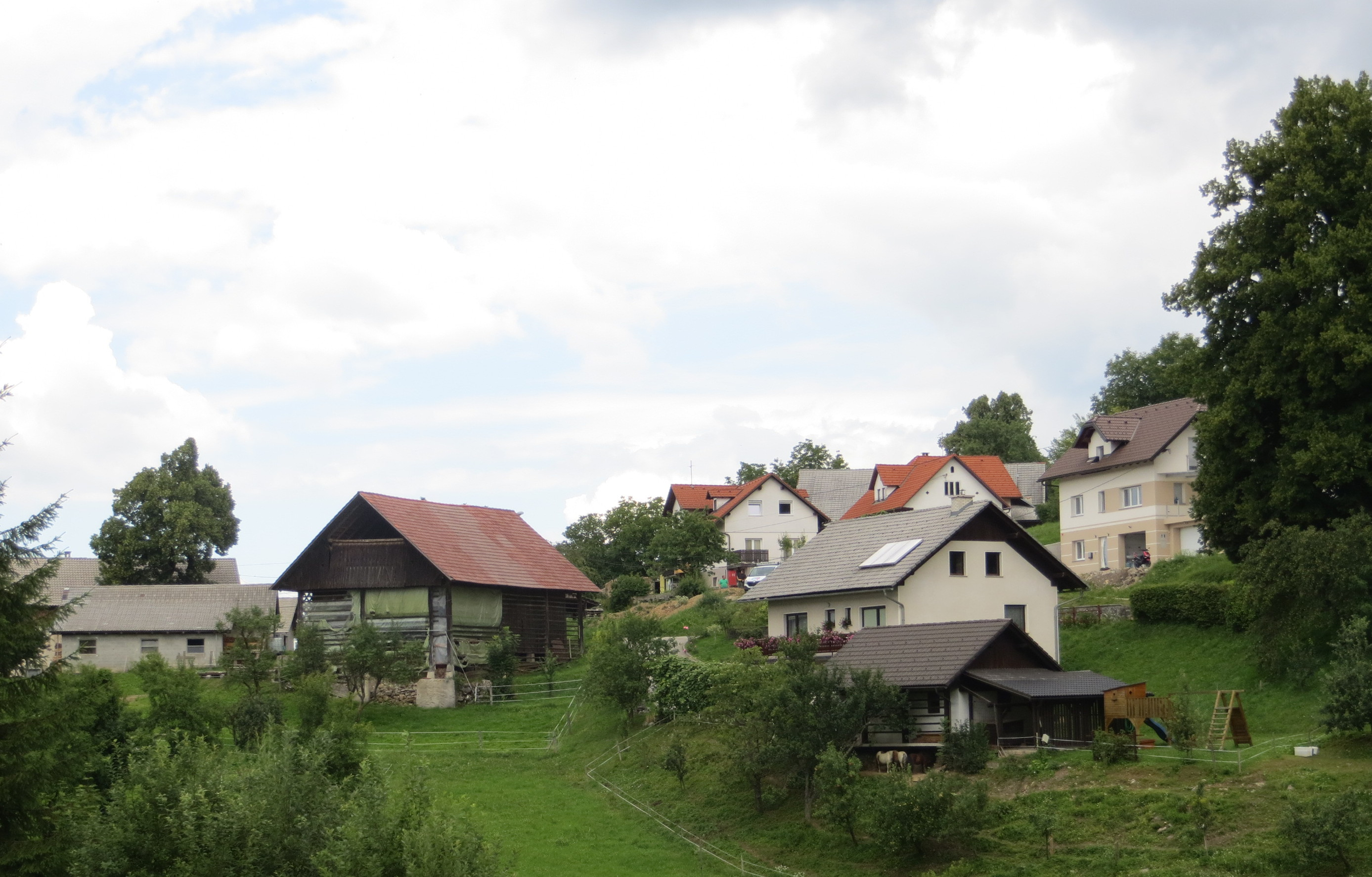

- Location in Slovenia
- Coordinates: 45°49′20.65″N 14°39′18.76″E
- Country: Slovenia
- Traditional region: Lower Carniola
- Statistical region: Central Slovenia
- Municipality: Velike Lašče

Area
  - Total: 0.97 km^{2} (0.37 sq mi)
- Elevation: 583.9 m (1,916 ft)

Population (2002)
  - Total: 21
- Postal code: 1315

Gornje Retje (pronounced [ˈɡoːɾnjɛ ˈɾeːtjɛ]; in older sources also Gorenje Retje, German: Oberretje) is a small settlement in the Municipality of Velike Lašče in central Slovenia. The railway line from Ljubljana to Kočevje and the main road from Velike Lašče to Ribnica run through the settlement. The area is part of the traditional region of Lower Carniola and is now included in the Central Slovenia Statistical Region.

== Name ==
The name Gornje Retje literally means 'upper Retje', distinguishing the village from neighboring Dolnje Retje (literally, 'lower Retje'). The name Retje (like the related name Retnje) is derived from the plural demonym *Vrětьjane, based on the common noun *vertьje, referring to a higher dry area in a damp or swampy area.
