= Dolnje Retje =

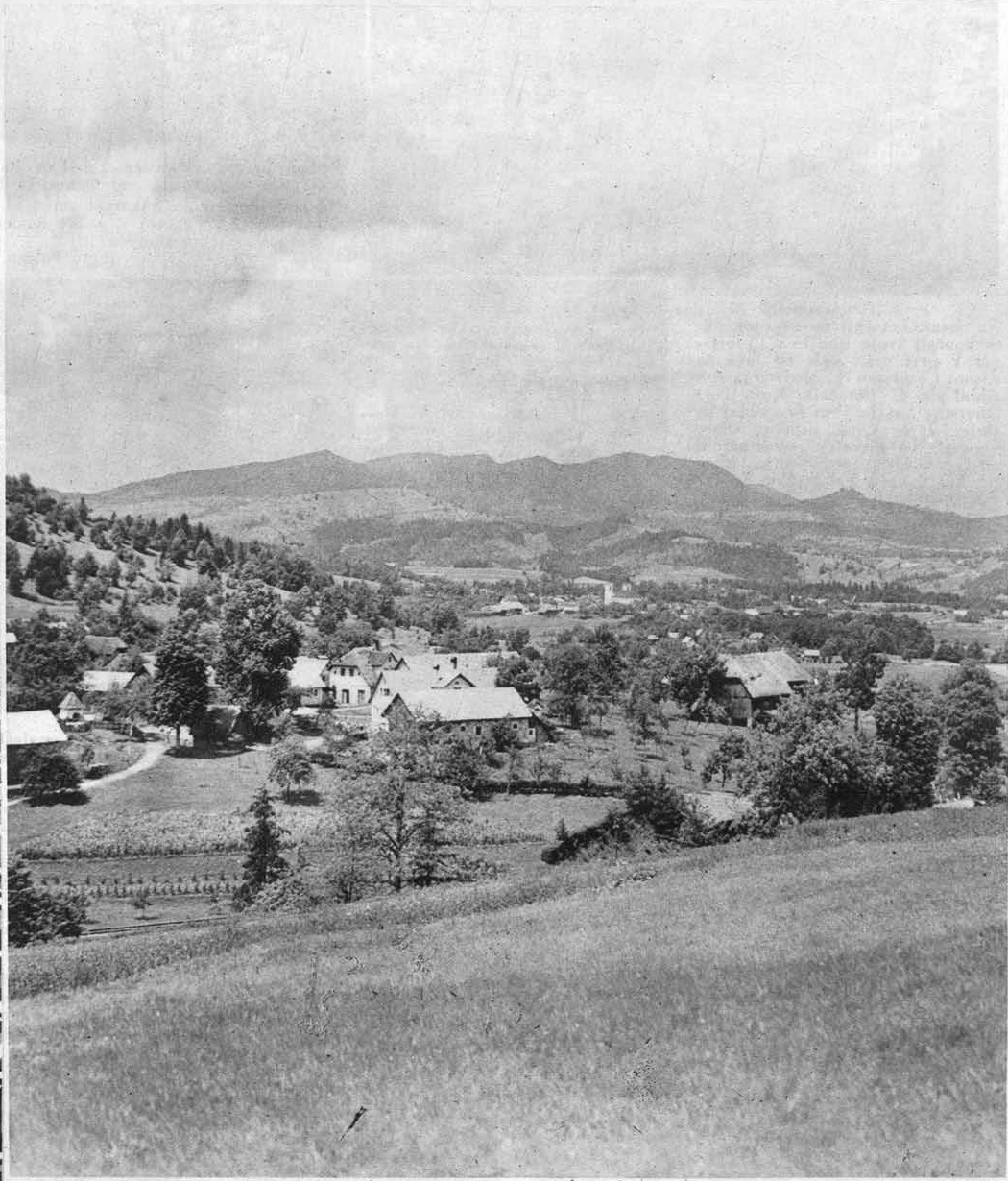
- Dolnje Retje c. 1930

- Location in Slovenia
- Coordinates: 45°49′29.36″N 14°39′6.66″E
- Country: Slovenia
- Traditional region: Lower Carniola
- Statistical region: Central Slovenia
- Municipality: Velike Lašče

Area
  - Total: 1.84 km^{2} (0.71 sq mi)
- Elevation: 575.5 m (1,888 ft)

Population (2002)
  - Total: 56
- Postal code: 1315

Dolnje Retje (pronounced [ˈdoːlnjɛ ˈɾeːtjɛ]; in older sources also Dolenje Retje, German: Unterretje) is a small village southeast of Velike Lašče in central Slovenia. The area is part of the traditional region of Lower Carniola and is now included in the Central Slovenia Statistical Region.

== Name ==
The name Dolnje Retje literally means 'lower Retje', distinguishing the village from neighboring Gornje Retje (literally, 'upper Retje'). The name Retje (like the related name Retnje) is derived from the plural demonym *Vrětьjane, based on the common noun *vertьje, referring to a higher dry area in a damp or swampy area.

== Cultural heritage ==
A small 18th-century chapel-shrine at the crossroads in the centre of the settlement is dedicated to Saint Roch.

== Notable people ==
The Slovene writer, political activist, playwright, and critic Fran Levstik was born in the village in 1831. A commemorative plaque was unveiled in 1889 on what remains of the house in which he was born. In 1987 a bronze bust was also placed nearby.
