= Franc Perko =

His Excellency Franc Perko
- Metropolitan Archbishop emeritus of Beograd
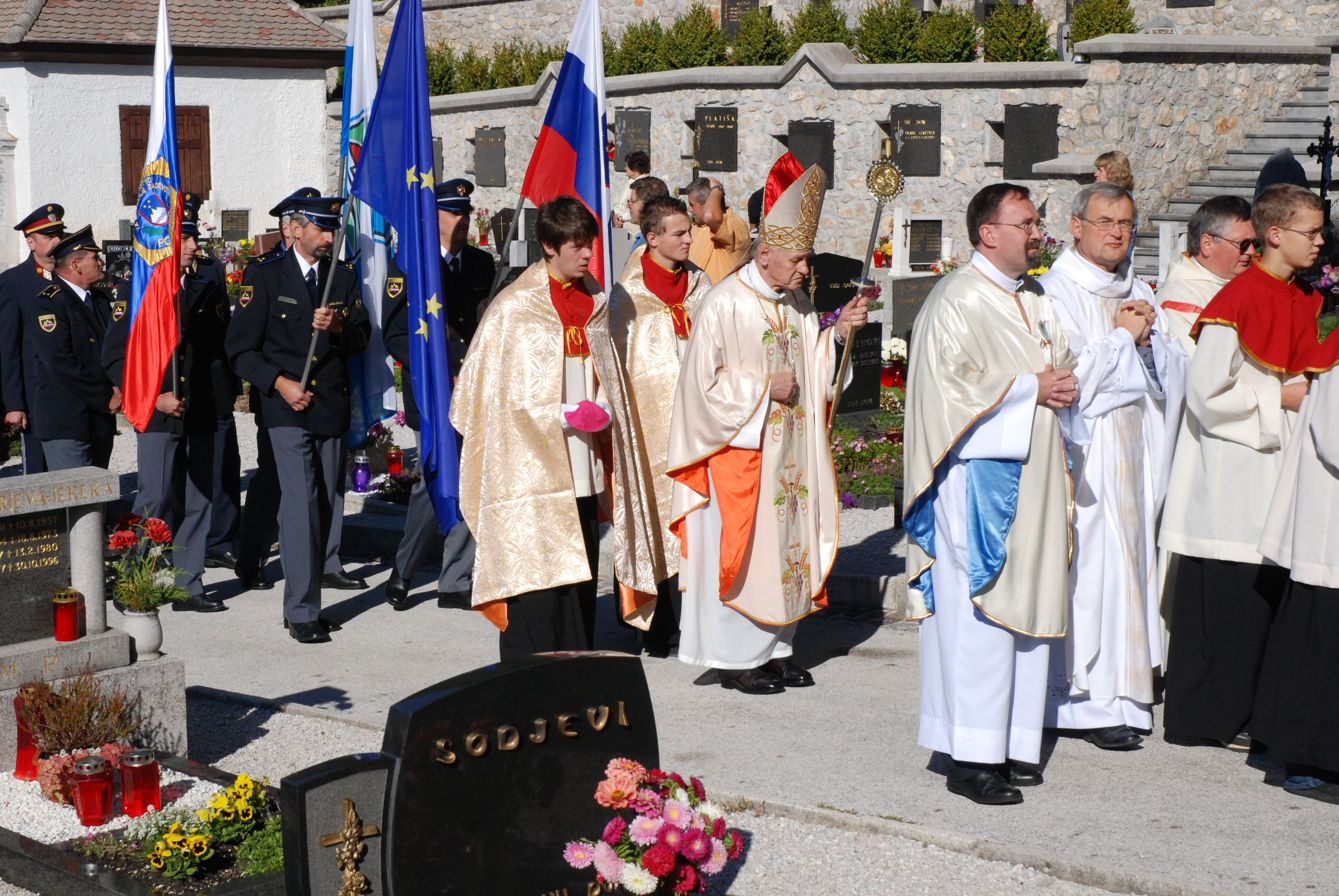
- Archbishop Perko celebrates Holy Mass for policemen in Srednja vas v Bohinju in 2009
- Native name: Franc Perko
- Church: Catholic Church
- Archdiocese: Belgrade
- Appointed: 16 December 1986 (from Pope John Paul II)
- Installed: 6 January 1987 (received episcopal ordination in Rome)
- Term ended: 21 March 2001 (Pope John Paul II accepted his resignation)
- Predecessor: Alojz Turk
- Successor: Stanislav Hočevar

Orders
- Ordination: 29 June 1953 (Ljubljana) by Anton Vovk bishop of Ljubljana
- Consecration: 6 January 1987 in St. Peter's Basilica by Saint Pope John Paul II titular archbishop Eduardo Martínez Somalo archbishop emeritus of Nueva Segovia José Tomás Sánchez
- Rank: bishop

Personal details
- Born: 19 November 1929 Krka, Yugoslavia
- Died: 20 February 2008 (aged 78) Ljubljana (Slovenia)
- Buried: Žale; 46°06'67.44"N 14°52'66.37"E
- Occupation: priest, bishop
- Profession: theology
- Education: University of Ljubljana; Faculty of Theology in Ljubljana; Pontifical Oriental Institute in Rome
- Motto: United in the Spirit; Latin: Uniti in Spiritu; Slovene: Zedinjeni v Duhu; Greek: Ενωμένοι το πνεύματι/Enomenoi to Pneumati; Croatian: Ujedinjeni u Duhu; Serbian Cyrillic: Уједињени у Духу

Franc Perko (19 November 1929 - 20 February 2008) was a Slovenian Roman Catholic prelate. He was the archbishop of the Archdiocese of Belgrade in Serbia between 1986 and 2001. He died on 20 February 2008 in Ljubljana (Slovenia).

He was also the president of the International Bishops' Conference of Saints Cyril and Methodius between 1993 and 2001.

== Biography ==
=== Youth and education ===
Franc Perko was born in Krka as the third child of father Janez and mother Jožefa.

In 1936 he began attending primary school, and then in 1941 he enrolled in the Diocesan Classical Gymnasium, Ljubljana. However, this institution was closed during World War II, so in 1945 he enrolled in the state classical gymnasium and successfully graduated in 1949.

In the autumn of 1949 he began studying at University of Ljubljana at the then state Faculty of Theology in Ljubljana, which was separated from the state university in 1952 and subsequently operated as an independent private church faculty.

=== Church activities ===
He was ordained a priest by bishop ob Ljubljana Anton Vovk in 1953. After a first mass, he received a call to serve in the military service in Belgrade. After completing it, he was imprisoned for several years for a mere verbal delict; he fell into a deep depression and this injustice marked him for the rest of his life and so he became a pronounced anti-communist. After illegal espionage, he was namely accused of "enemy propaganda", although it was only an innocent joke at Tito's expense.

In 1964, he became a lecturer at the Faculty of Theology in Ljubljana, and in the fall of 1965, he went to study in Rome, where he also received a doctorate at the Pontifical Oriental Institute.

=== Archbishop and Metropolitan of Belgrade ===
On 16 December 1986, Pope John Paul II appointed him Archbishop of Belgrade and the first Metropolitan of Belgrade. The Pope also consecrated him in St. Peter's Basilica on 6 January 1987.

The first Archbishop of Belgrade after the establishment of the Kingdom of Serbs, Croats and Slovenes was the Franciscan Rafael Rodić, who was not yet a metropolitan. Archbishop Perko was a member of the International Theological Commission between 1986 and 1991, and in the period 1988–1998 he was also a member of the International Catholic-Orthodox Theological Commission. He also presided over the Yugoslav or International Episcopal Conference of the Holy Brothers Cyril and Methodius from 1993 until the end of his episcopate in 2001.

When it comes to the name Yugoslav Episcopal Conference, we must distinguish between the period of Austria-Hungary, Old (Kingdom of Yugoslavia) and New Yugoslavia (SFR Yugoslavia), when this conference covered the entire Yugoslav territory. After the breakup of Yugoslavia in 1991s, its eastern part (Serbia and Montenegro) continued to be officially called Yugoslavia - and so the Yugoslav Episcopal Conference also continued to exist in the eastern part of the former country; this "Yugoslav Episcopal Conference" was chaired by him under new name "International Bishops' Conference of Saints Cyril and Methodius". The country was then renamed Serbia and Montenegro, the name of Bishops Conference covers the entire eastern region of the former Yugoslavia with Serbia, Kosovo and Montenegro under the name of the holy brothers Cyril and Methodius.

=== Bishop's motto ===
Perko chose the words „United in the Spirit“ for his episcopal motto; in order to be closer to the thinking of Eastern Christians, the basic motto was in Greek.

On the one hand, this motto expresses the ecumenical effort for cooperation and rapprochement between Christians; on the other hand, it expresses his inner conviction that Christians – especially Catholics and Orthodox – are already united in the Holy Spirit, although not yet formally. In this conviction, upon taking office – at least at the beginning – he did not consider the requests of Catholics who, for some reason, would like to return from Orthodoxy, where they may have been carried away by love or some similar human reason, saying that we Christians are already one. However, he soon realized that this unity, at least outwardly, had not yet been achieved and he followed the usual procedure, which was especially evident in the arrangement of so-called mixed marriages, in which, for example, the groom was Catholic and the bride was Orthodox. Even more complicated was the issue of marriages that Catholics had contracted in the Orthodox Church before March 25, 1967. Since then, the Catholic Church has allowed Catholics to marry before an Orthodox priest for important reasons with the permission of a bishop; the marriage has become valid even without this permission. Marriages that had been invalidly concluded in the Orthodox Church before this time could be ordered to be rescinded with "sanatio in radice".

=== Works ===
1. Uvod v ekumensko bogoslovje (1963)
2. Vzhodne cerkve (1967)
3. Nauk o cerkvi (1967 — more editions)
4. Eden je gospod (1973)
5. Principi ekumenizma (1974)
6. Verstva v Jugoslaviji (1978).

He contributed more than 200 articles to the "Bogoslovni vestnik", "Cerkev v setanjem svetu", and the anthology "V edinosti" ("In Unity"); between 1971-1988 he was also one of the co-editors of this ecumenical anthology.

== Death and memory ==
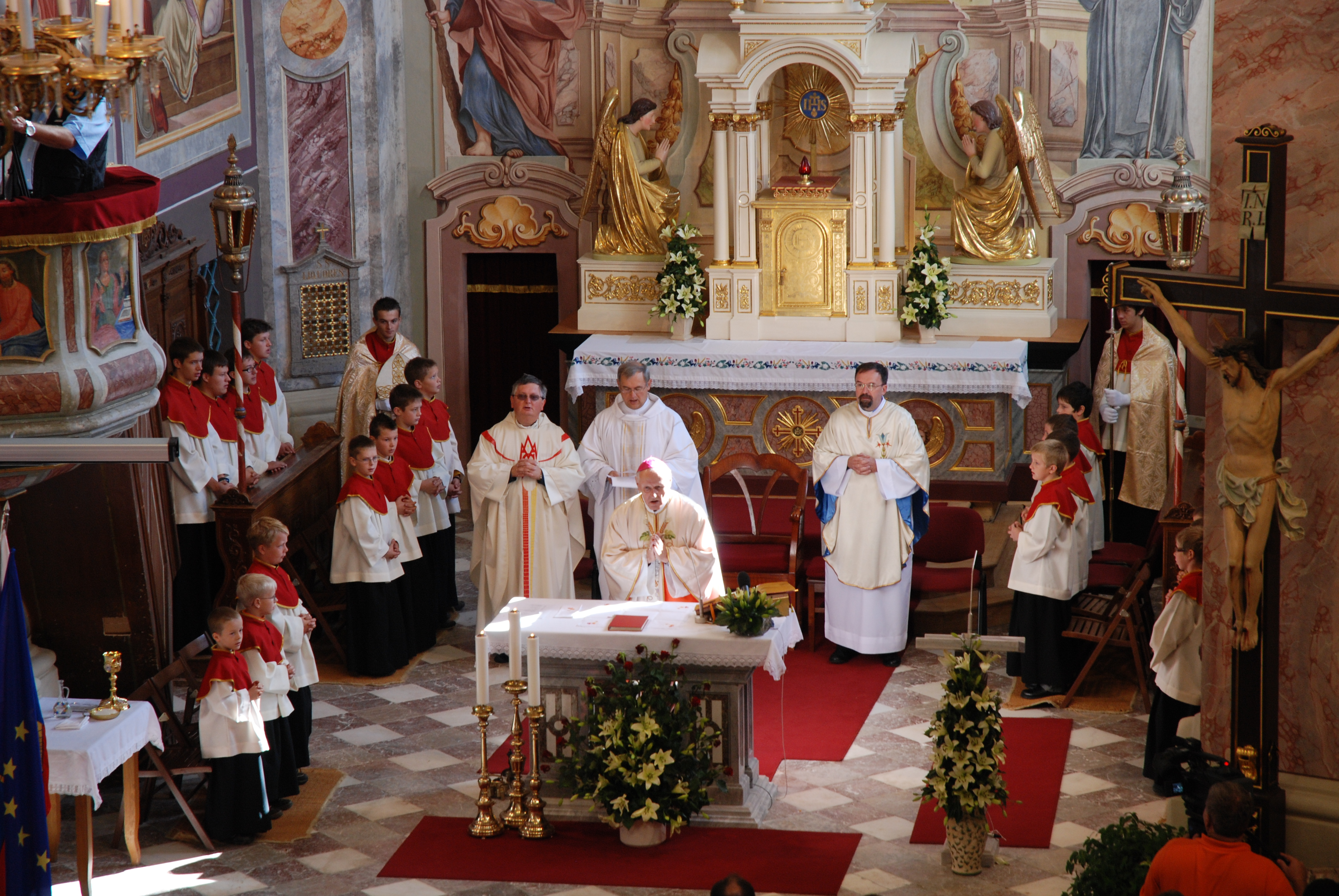
Holy Mass for policemen in Srednja Vas v Bohinju celebrated by archbishop emeritus Franc Perko in the year 2007

=== Resignation and retirement ===
In 2001, however, he resigned from the position of Archbishop of Belgrade, as he had requested retirement several times in the 1990s due to a long-standing serious illness. After returning to Slovenia, he settled with the Sisters of the Holy Cross in Mala Loka near Domžale, where he had already lived as a professor. Archbishop Perko was also a member of the Episcopal Conference of Slovenia, within which he was responsible for the field of ecumenism.

Despite his serious illness, Franc Perko did not rest even in retirement, but participated in discussions about the war and post-war period in the former Yugoslavia and was critical of the communist authorities at the time. He advocated for the revision of the judgment of Bishop of Ljubljana Gregorij Rožman and mentioned that a monument should be erected to him.

=== Death and funeral ===
He died in the priest's home on Lepi pot in Ljubljana on Wednesday, 20 February 2008, at the age of 79, as the retired or emeritus Archbishop and Metropolitan of Belgrade. On Thursday morning, he was transported to the Ljubljana Cathedral, where the evening mass for the repose of his soul was offered by the Archbishop and Metropolitan of Ljubljana Alojzij Uran. On Saturday, 23 February, his funeral was held at noon in Cemetery of Žale. It was led by the Archbishop and Metropolitan of Belgrade and his successor Stanislav Hočevar.

=== Scientific conference ===
On February 20, 2018, a scientific conference was held in the large hall of the Faculty of Theology in Ljubljana on the tenth anniversary of the death of Professor and Archbishop Franc Perko (1929-2008) and on the 140th anniversary of his birth, on his professor Franc Grivec (1878-1963); he was the one who inspired him most for ecumenism.

Ten lecturers took part, professionally assessing his work as an academic and lecturer, as a Catholic bishop and humanitarian, and as a committed ecumenical worker.

== See also ==
- Ecumenism
- Breakup of Yugoslavia

Catholic Church titles
Preceded by Alojz Turk	Archbishop of Belgrade; 1987 – 2001	Succeeded by Stanislav Hočevar
