= Jelendol, Ribnica =

Jelendol
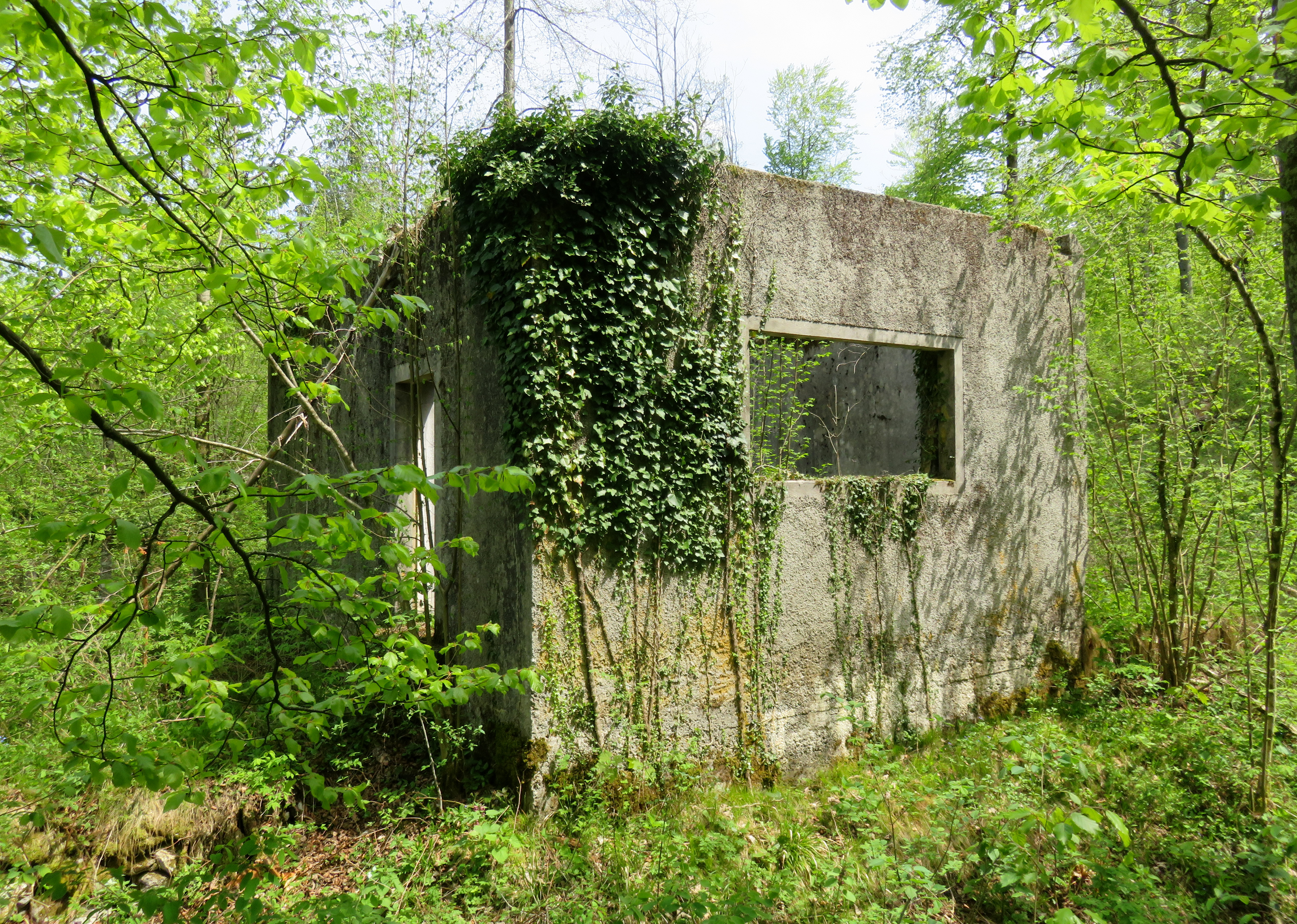
- A ruin in Jelendol

- Location in Slovenia
- Coordinates: 45°40′15.8″N 14°45′44.67″E
- Country: Slovenia
- Traditional region: Lower Carniola
- Statistical region: Southeast Slovenia
- Municipality: Ribnica

Area
  - Total: 3.73 km^{2} (1.44 sq mi)

Population (2002)
  - Total: 0

Jelendol (pronounced [ˈjeːlɛndɔl]; German: Hirschgruben or Hirisgruben, Gottscheerish: Hirisgruəbn) is a settlement south of Rakitnica in the Municipality of Ribnica in southern Slovenia. The area is part of the traditional region of Lower Carniola and is now included in the Southeast Slovenia Statistical Region.

== Name ==
According to Snoj, names like Jêlendol, pronounced /ɛː/, are ultimately derived from the Slovene common noun jelen 'red deer', meaning 'deer hollow, deer valley', but names like Jélendol, pronounced /eː/, are instead derived from *Jélin dôl, literally 'fir hollow, fir valley' from the Slovene common noun jela 'fir'. This toponym is one of the latter. The German name Hirschgruben and the Gottscheerish name Hirisgruəbn mean 'deer hollow' (cf. German Hirsch 'deer', Gottscheerish hiris 'deer').

== History ==
Jelendol was a Gottschee German settlement. North of the village, on the slope of Strmec Hill, are the remnants of an unfinished castle that the Auersperg noble family had started building. The Auerspergs drew water from Cave Spring (Slovene: izvir Jama) to supply a steam-powered sawmill in the village. Jelendol was an industrial settlement in the middle of a fir and beech forest. The sawmill had a production capacity of 700 wagons of lumber per year, which was exported to Italy, Spain, and Africa. Before the Second World War, the village had three houses and a population of 48. The original residents were evicted from the area in 1941 during the Second World War and the sawmill was burned. After the war, the site consisted of two large buildings surrounded by coniferous forest. The village no longer has any permanent residents, and the buildings were occasionally used by forestry workers until they were removed in the 1980s.

=== Mass grave ===
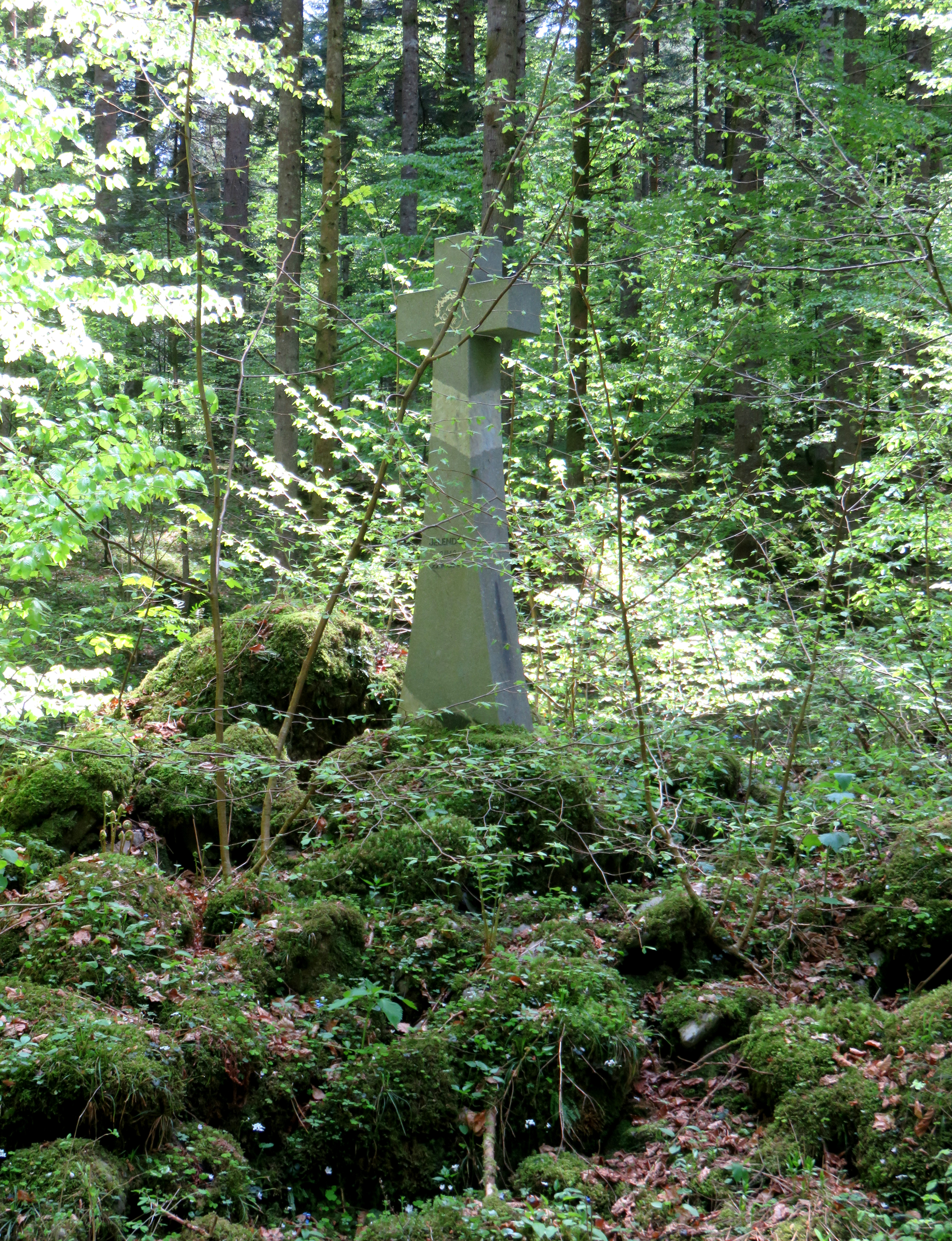
Jelendol Mass Grave

Jelendol is the site of a mass grave from the Second World War. The Jelendol Mass Grave (Slovene: Grobišče Jelendol) is located 9 km south of Ribnica, about 100 to 150 meters (330 to 490 ft) west of the road between Ribnica and Grčarice. It contained the remains of 119 anticommunist militia prisoners of war from the prison in Ribnica that were shot by the communist Security and Intelligence Service (VOS) in October 1943. Most of the victims were reburied at the military cemetery in Hrovača on 4 October 1944.
