= Grčarske Ravne =

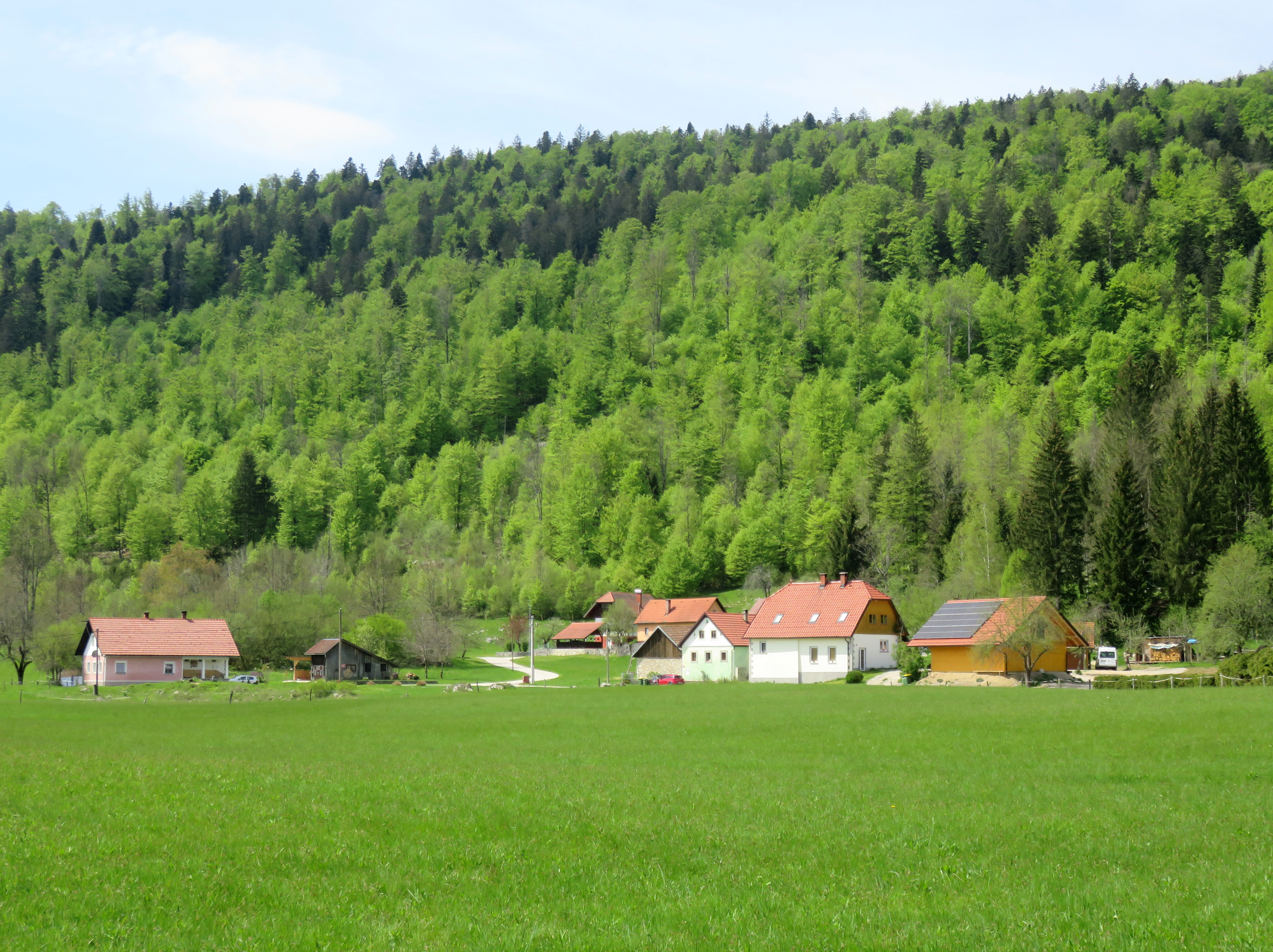

- Location in Slovenia
- Coordinates: 45°39′32.93″N 14°44′52.65″E
- Country: Slovenia
- Traditional region: Lower Carniola
- Statistical region: Southeast Slovenia
- Municipality: Ribnica

Area
  - Total: 2.71 km^{2} (1.05 sq mi)
- Elevation: 520.2 m (1,707 ft)

Population (2002)
  - Total: 13
- Postal code: 1331

Grčarske Ravne (pronounced [ˈɡəɾtʃaɾskɛ ˈɾáːwnɛ]; German: Masereben) is a settlement south of Dolenja Vas in the Municipality of Ribnica in southern Slovenia. The area is part of the traditional region of Lower Carniola and is now included in the Southeast Slovenia Statistical Region.

== History ==
The village was inhabited by Gottschee Germans, who were expelled from the area in 1941 during the Second World War. In the 1960s, all German tombstones were removed from the local cemetery in the neighboring village of Grčarice.
