= Jože Rus =

Slovene geographer and historian (1888–1945)

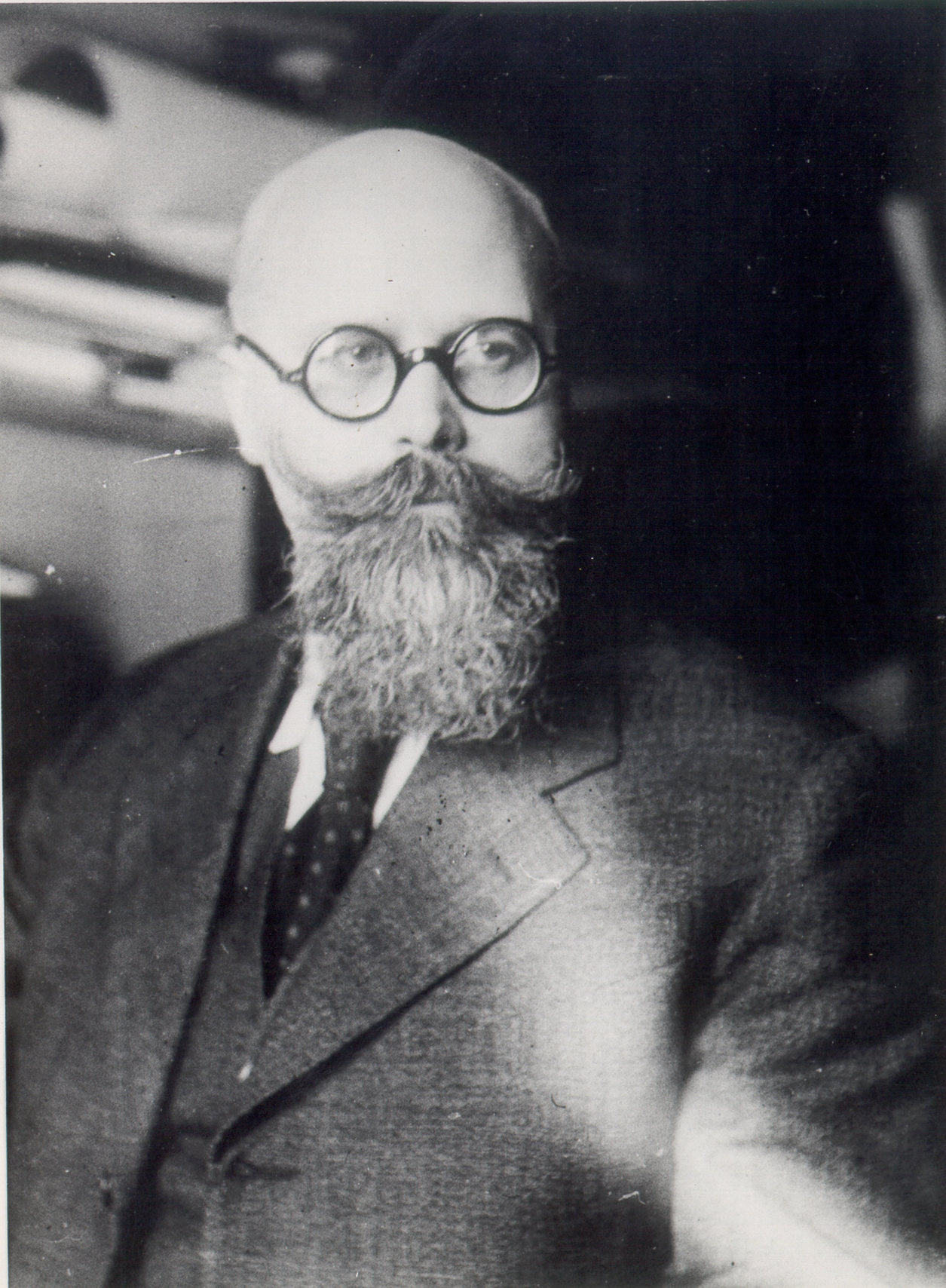
- Born: March 20, 1888; Ribnica, Austria-Hungary
- Died: March 25, 1945 (aged 57); Buchenwald concentration camp, Germany
- Occupation(s): Geographer, historian

Jože Rus (March 20, 1888 – March 25, 1945) was a Slovene geographer and historian.

== Early life and education ==
Jože Rus was born in Ribnica, where he was baptized Jožef Rus. His father was the merchant Janez (a.k.a. Ivan) Rus, and his mother was Ivana Rus (née Švigelj). Rus graduated from the University of Vienna in 1914 and also received his doctorate there in 1918.

== Career ==
Rus taught as a substitute teacher at the high schools in Kranj (1914–1916) and Celje (1918–1919), and he then worked as a geographical and statistical expert until 1924, including at the ministry in Belgrade. During this time, as a committee member, he helped prepare legal drafts for the administrative division of the Kingdom of Yugoslavia into provinces (oblasts). From 1924 until he was arrested by the Germans in 1944, he was a librarian at the Lyceum Library in Ljubljana. In early 1944 he was sent to the Dachau concentration camp, and toward the end of World War II to Buchenwald, where he died of exhaustion on March 25, 1945. According to some sources, he was shot while escaping.

== Research ==
Rus began his extensive research work in 1918 with his dissertation Das Unterkrainer Karstgebiet (The Karst Area of Lower Carniola), a regional-geographical study with special reference to karst hydrographic phenomena. He published several geographical studies on Slovenia and contributed to the creation and foundation of Slovenian geographical terminology. An important part of Rus' work is his historical-geographical contributions on Mount Triglav (Triglav. Historijsko-geografske črtice 'Triglav: Historical-Geographical Sketches') and Ljubljana (Organske osnove v začetkih ljubljanskega mesta 'Organic Foundations in the Beginnings of the City of Ljubljana').
