= Prigorica =

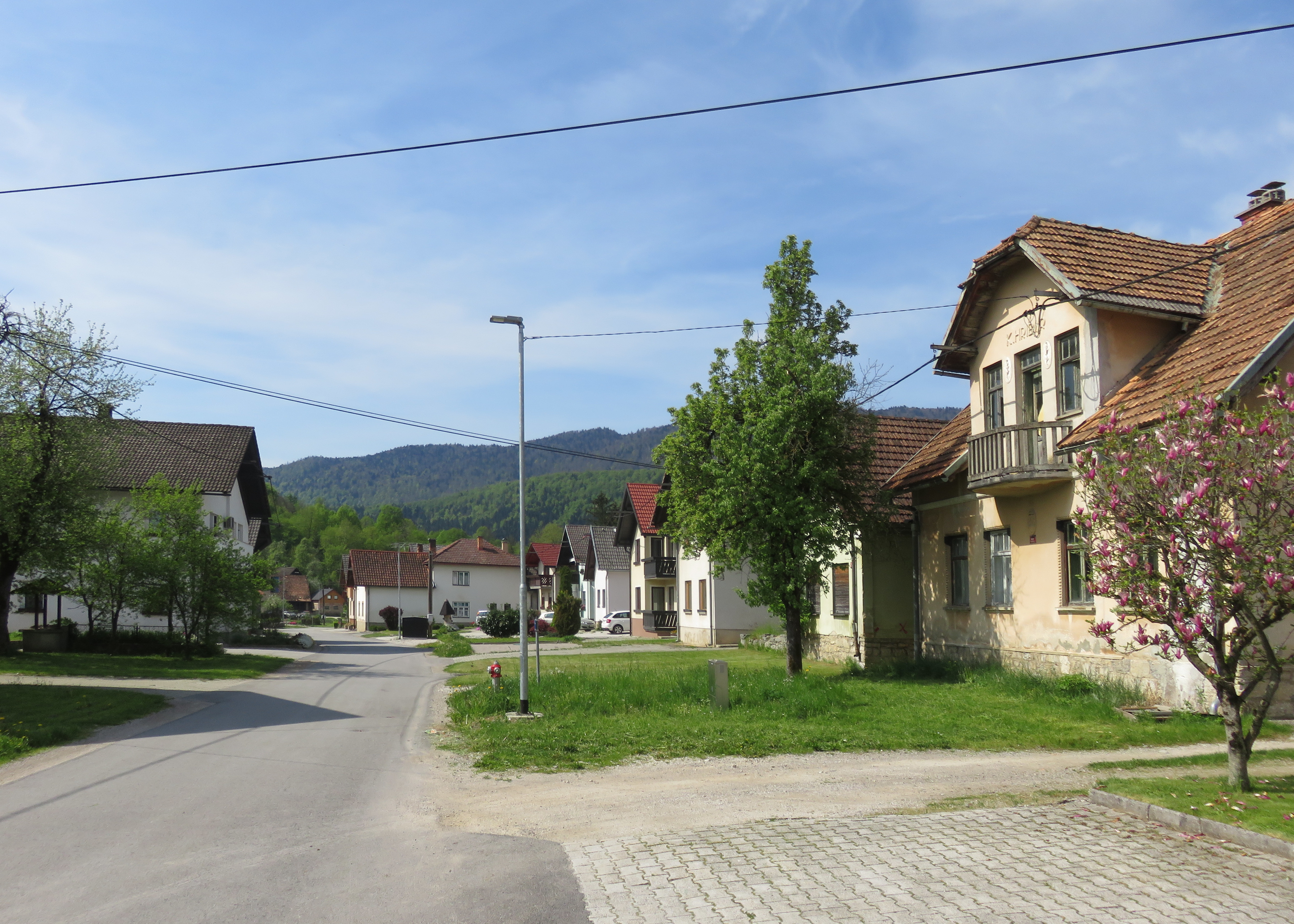

- Location in Slovenia
- Coordinates: 45°42′47.26″N 14°44′38.37″E
- Country: Slovenia
- Traditional region: Lower Carniola
- Statistical region: Southeast Slovenia
- Municipality: Ribnica

Area
  - Total: 3.44 km^{2} (1.33 sq mi)
- Elevation: 485.2 m (1,592 ft)

Population (2002)
  - Total: 456
- Postal code: 1331

Prigorica (pronounced [pɾiɡɔˈɾiːtsa]; German: Büchelsdorf) is a village immediately north of Dolenja Vas in the Municipality of Ribnica in southern Slovenia. The area is part of the traditional region of Lower Carniola and is now included in the Southeast Slovenia Statistical Region. It includes the hamlet of Videm about 800 meters (2,600 ft) east of the village center.

== Church ==
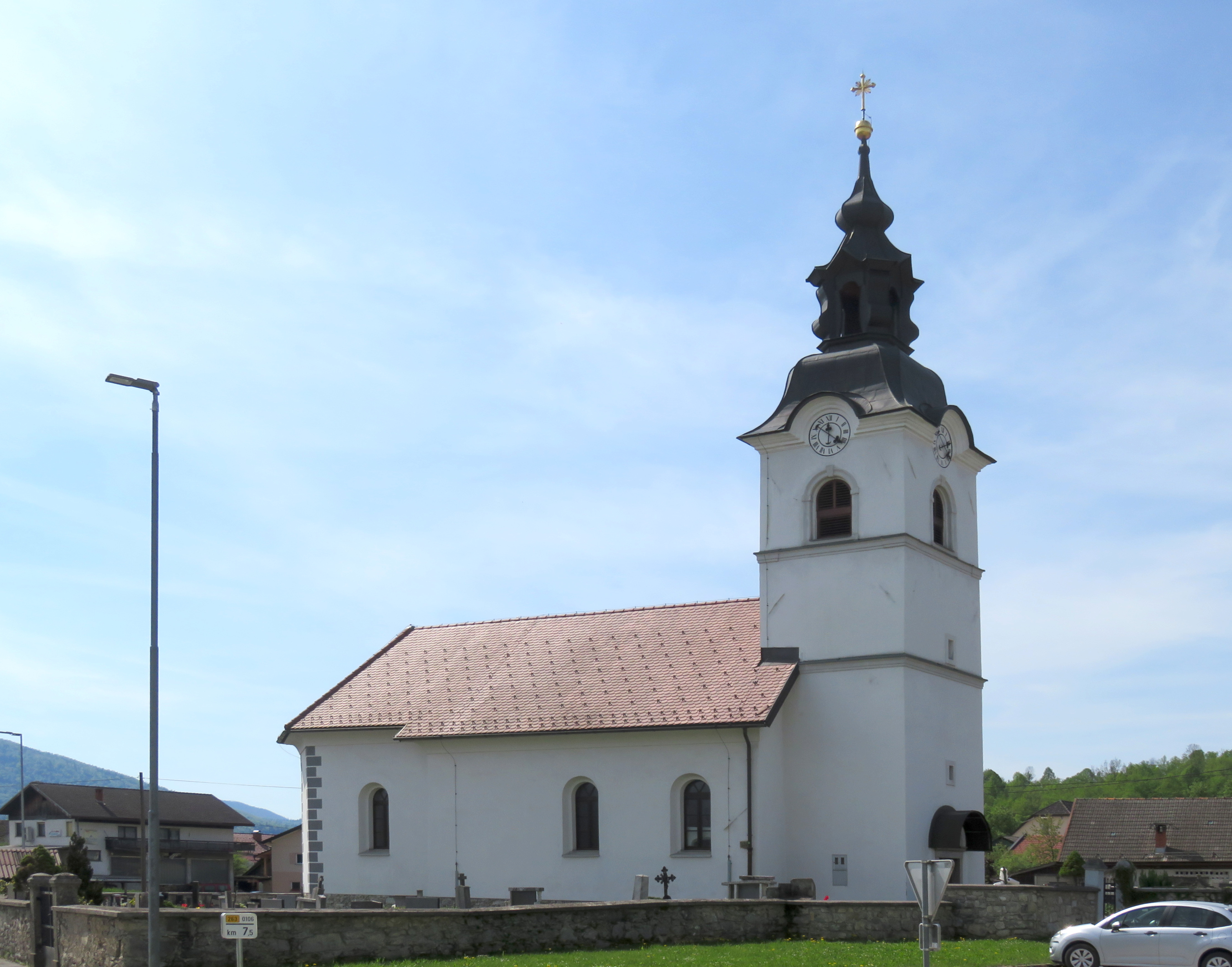
Saints Peter and Paul Church

The local church is dedicated to Saints Peter and Paul and belongs to the Parish of Dolenja Vas. It is an 18th-century church that was rebuilt in 1855 and thoroughly renovated between 2005 and 2008.

== History ==
During the Second World War, a number of civilians from Prigorica were abducted and murdered by the Partisans on July 28, 1942 and buried in the Žiglovica Cave Mass Grave (Slovene: Grobišče Jama Žiglovica) in Ribnica. The bodies were recovered from the cave in 2016 and were buried in June 2017 at the cemetery in the hamlet of Videm. In October 2017, victims from the Konfin Shaft 1 Mass Grave and Konfin Shaft 2 Mass Grave were also buried at the cemetery.
