= Stanislav Hočevar =

Slovenian archbishop (born 1945)

His Excellency Stanislav Hočevar S.D.B.
- Metropolitan Archbishop emeritus of Beograd
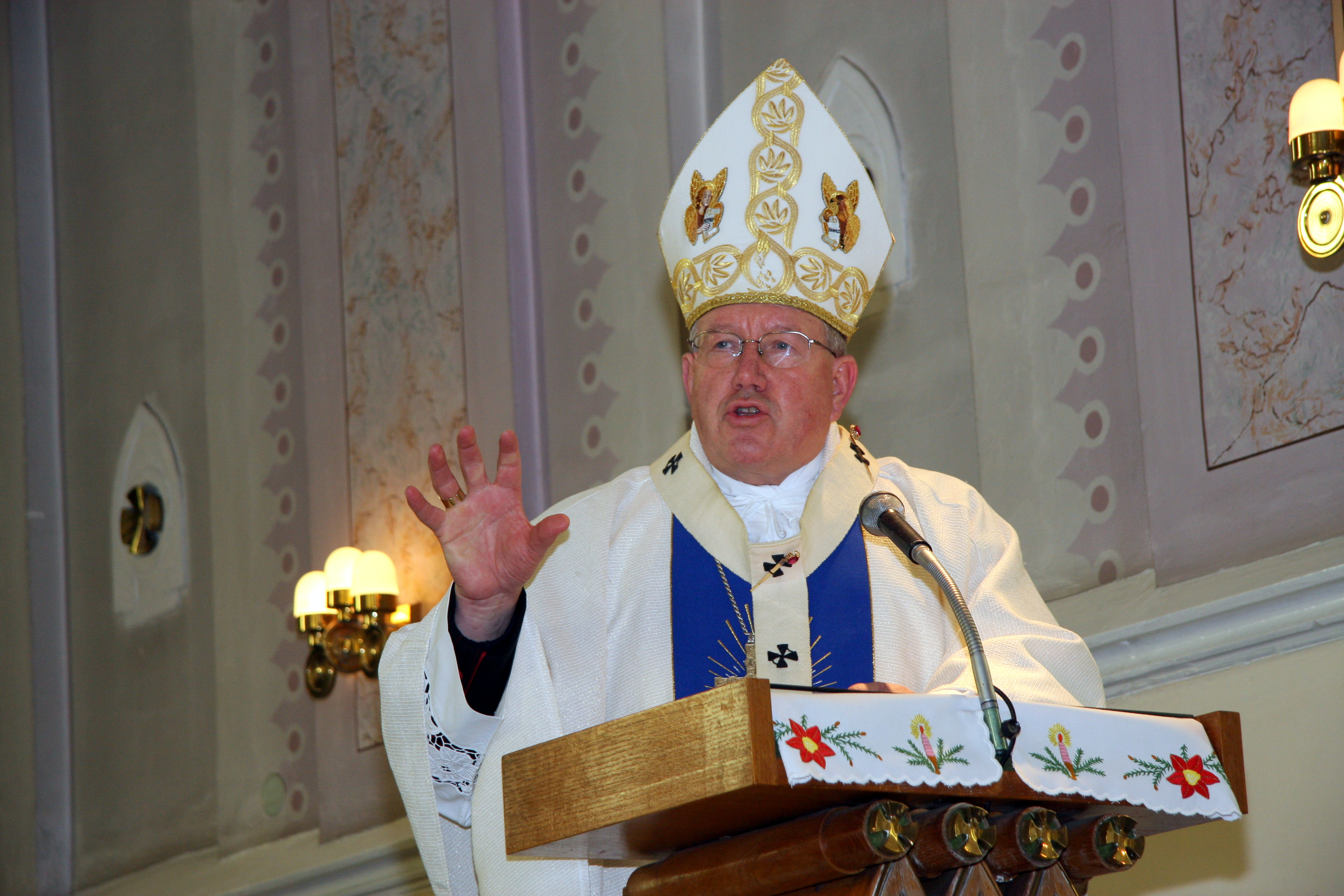
- Hočevar in 2009
- Church: Catholic Church
- Archdiocese: Belgrade
- Appointed: 25 March 2000
- Installed: 31 March 2001
- Term ended: 5 November 2022
- Predecessor: Franc Perko
- Successor: László Német

Orders
- Ordination: 29 June 1973
- Consecration: 24 May 2000 by Edmond Y. Farhat

Personal details
- Born: 12 November 1945 (age 80) Jelendol, Škocjan, FPR Yugoslavia
- Coat of arms: Stanislav Hočevar's coat of arms

Stanislav Hočevar (Serbian Cyrillic: Станислав Хочевар; born 12 November 1945) is a Slovenian Roman Catholic prelate. He was the archbishop of the Archdiocese of Belgrade in Serbia between 2001 and 2022. He was also the president of the International Bishops' Conference of Saints Cyril and Methodius between 2001 and 2011.

== Biography ==
Hočevar was born on 12 November 1945 in the village of Jelendol in PR Slovenia, then part of the Federal People's Republic of Yugoslavia. After the primary school graduation in 1960 in Škocjan, he joined the Salesians of Don Bosco. He studied gymnasium in Križevci and Rijeka. Hočevar served in the Yugoslav People's Army in 1966/67 in Skopje. After that, he was instructor at the catholic novitiate in Želimlje near Ljubljana. He studied theology at the Theological Faculty in Ljubljana. Hočevar was ordained a priest on 29 June 1973. He achieved a magister degree at the Theological Faculty in Ljubljana in 1979 with thesis on Personal sin in today's hamartiology.

Between 1982 and 1984, Hočevar was the deputy of the Salesian Provincial of Slovenia. Later, he served four years as the principal of the catholic boarding school in Klagenfurt, Austria. In 1988, he was appointed Salesian Provincial of Slovenia, the position he held until 2000. He has taken part in four Salesian General Chapters in Rome. He served two terms as the president of the Conference of senior religious leaders of Slovenia, and then for two years as the Secretary General of the same conference.

In 1999, during the NATO bombing of Yugoslavia, Hočevar launched an initiative titled "Peace to you, the Balkans" and also established a fund for families with many children called "Anin sklad" (Ana's Harmony). In 2000, pope John Paul II appointed Hočevar the coadjutor bishop of Belgrade. He was ordained a bishop on 24 May 2000 in the Church of Mary Help of Christians in Ljubljana. On 31 March 2001, pope accepted a request for the removal of the former archbishop France Perko, so Hočevar became Archbishop of Belgrade. On 16 April 2001, he was elected president of the Bishops' Conference of Yugoslavia, later renamed International Bishops' Conference of Saints Cyril and Methodius, an office he served until 2011.

On 5 November 2022, it was announced that Pope Francis had accepted Hočevar's resignation as Archbishop of Belgrade and on the same day it was announced that Ladislav Nemet, bishop of Zrenjanin since 2008, would succeed him.

Catholic Church titles
Preceded by Franc Perko	Archbishop of Belgrade; 2001 – 2022	Succeeded by László Német
