= Mrzli Potok =

- Location in Slovenia
- Coordinates: 45°37′28.44″N 14°44′21.21″E
- Country: Slovenia
- Traditional region: Lower Carniola
- Statistical region: Southeast Slovenia
- Municipality: Kočevje
- Elevation: 590 m (1,940 ft)

Population (2002)
  - Total: 0

Mrzli Potok (pronounced [ˈməɾzli ˈpɔːtok]; German: Kaltenbrunn, Gottscheerish: Kaotnprunn) is a remote abandoned settlement in the Municipality of Kočevje in southern Slovenia. The area is part of the traditional region of Lower Carniola and is now included in the Southeast Slovenia Statistical Region. Its territory is now part of the village of Gotenica.

== Name ==
The Slovene name Mrzli Potok literally means 'cold creek'. It is semantically similar to the German name Kaltenbrunn, literally, 'cold spring. There is a spring at the site of the former settlement known as Cold Spring (Slovene: Mrzli studenec).

== History ==
A small settlement known as Brunn bei Masern (literally, 'spring near Grčarice') existed in the land registry of 1574, cited therein as Beim Prun ('by the spring'). It had one full farm divided into two half farms, corresponding to a population between eight and 12. It was not mentioned in the 1770 census, and Erich Petschauer concludes that it was absorbed into Grčarice. However, Ivan Simonič identifies Brunn bei Masern with Mrzli Potok.

In the 19th century, a steam-powered sawmill owned by the Auersperg noble family operated at Mrzli Potok. It was established in 1871. Before the Second World War the settlement had five houses with a variable population.
