= Žlebič, Ribnica =

Žlebič
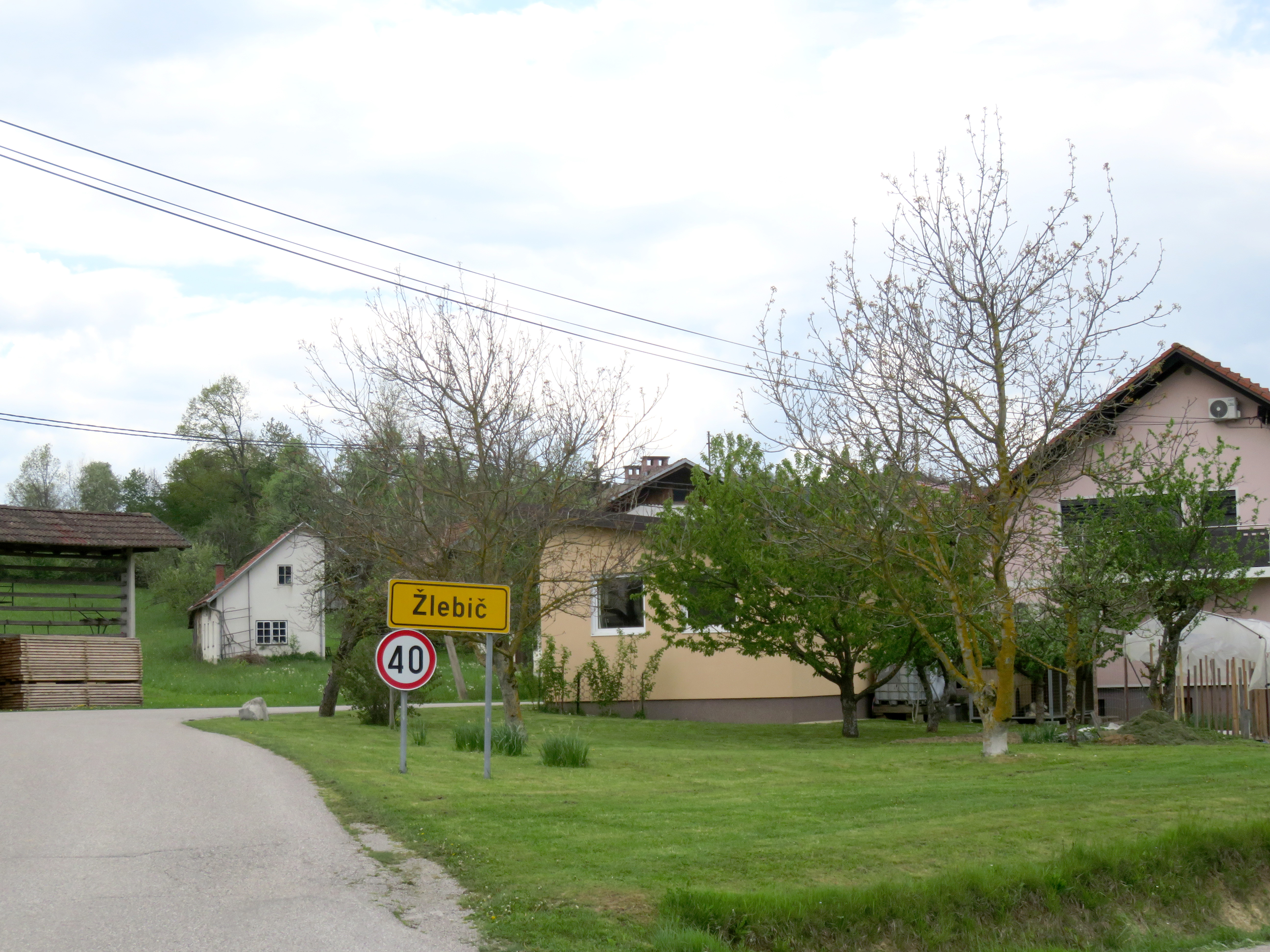

- Location in Slovenia
- Coordinates: 45°45′57.61″N 14°41′35.15″E
- Country: Slovenia
- Traditional region: Lower Carniola
- Statistical region: Southeast Slovenia
- Municipality: Ribnica

Area
  - Total: 2.15 km^{2} (0.83 sq mi)
- Elevation: 512 m (1,680 ft)

Population (2002)
  - Total: 236
- Postal code: 1310

Žlebič (pronounced [ʒlɛˈbitʃ]; German: Schlebitsch) is a village in the Municipality of Ribnica in southern Slovenia. The railway line from Ljubljana to Kočevje runs through the settlement. The area is part of the traditional region of Lower Carniola and is now included in the Southeast Slovenia Statistical Region.

== History ==
During the Second World War, a number of civilians from Žlebič were murdered on 28 July 1942 and buried in the Žiglovica Cave Mass Grave (Slovene: Grobišče Jama Žiglovica) in Ribnica.
