= Glažuta, Loški Potok =

Glažuta
- Location in Slovenia
- Coordinates: 45°40′15.47″N 14°41′10.67″E
- Country: Slovenia
- Traditional region: Lower Carniola
- Statistical region: Southeast Slovenia
- Municipality: Loški Potok

Area
  - Total: 27.66 km^{2} (10.68 sq mi)
- Elevation: 763.5 m (2,505 ft)

Population (2002)
  - Total: 0
- Postal code: 1331

Glažuta (pronounced [ɡlaˈʒuːta]; German: Karlshütten or Karlshütte, Gottschee German: Gloschhittn) is a small remote village in the Municipality of Loški Potok in southern Slovenia. It no longer has any permanent residents. The area is part of the traditional region of Lower Carniola and is now included in the Southeast Slovenia Statistical Region.

== Name ==
The name Glažuta is relatively common in Slovenia and is ultimately derived from Middle High German glashütte 'glassworks'. The standard German name Karlshütte(n) literally means 'Karl's (glass)works' and is a reference to Prince Karl of Auersperg. The Gottschee German name Gloschhittn is cognate with standard German Glashütte(n) 'glassworks'.

== History ==
Glažuta was founded in 1835 (Note: According to Valenčič, 1835 is a clear error.) or 1840 as a glassworks established by the Ranzinger brothers for Prince Karl of Auersperg. It had two kilns with eight chambers, initially producing sheet glass and later only bent glass, mostly for export. Glažuta had the first steam boiler in Carniola, which was used to power a grinder. Most of the workers at the facility were German; judging by the surnames, there may have also been some Czech workers, but very few ethnic Slovenes. The glassworks ceased operations in 1855 or 1856, and a steam-powered sawmill was established at the site in 1870 or 1871. (Note: Valenčič casts doubt on 1871, which is taken from a source with another error.) This was the first steam-powered sawmill in Gottschee. The settlement had five houses before the Second World War. The sawmill was destroyed during the war.

During the Second World War, 10 prisoners killed a Partisan guard near Glažuta and escaped. The Partisan Šercer Brigade murdered 48 prisoners of war from the prison in Kočevje in revenge on 2 November 1943, burying the victims in the Travna Gora 1–4 mass graves (Slovene: Grobišče Travna gora 1–4) in Ravni Dol.

=== Mass graves ===
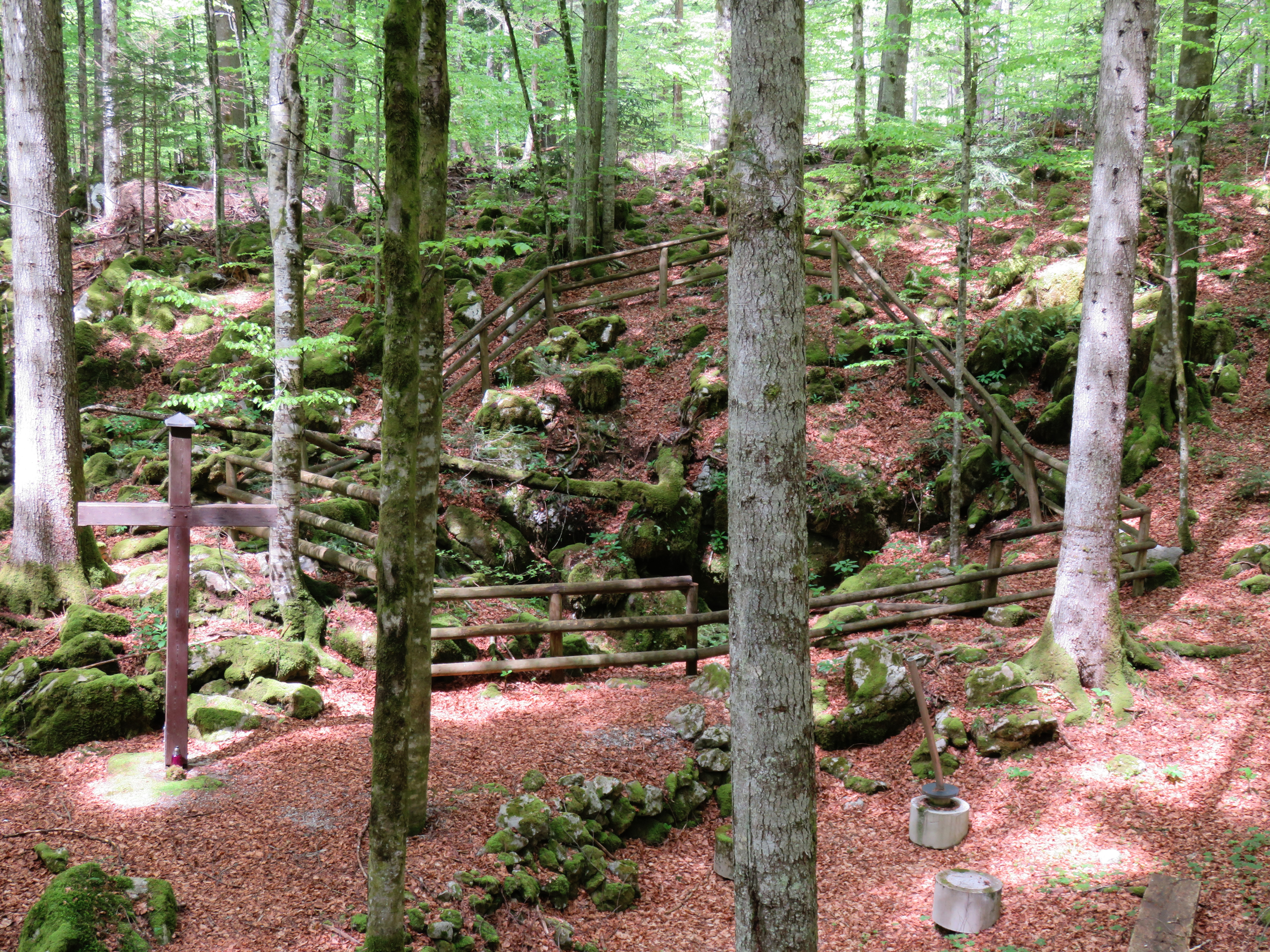
Konfin Shaft 1 Mass Grave

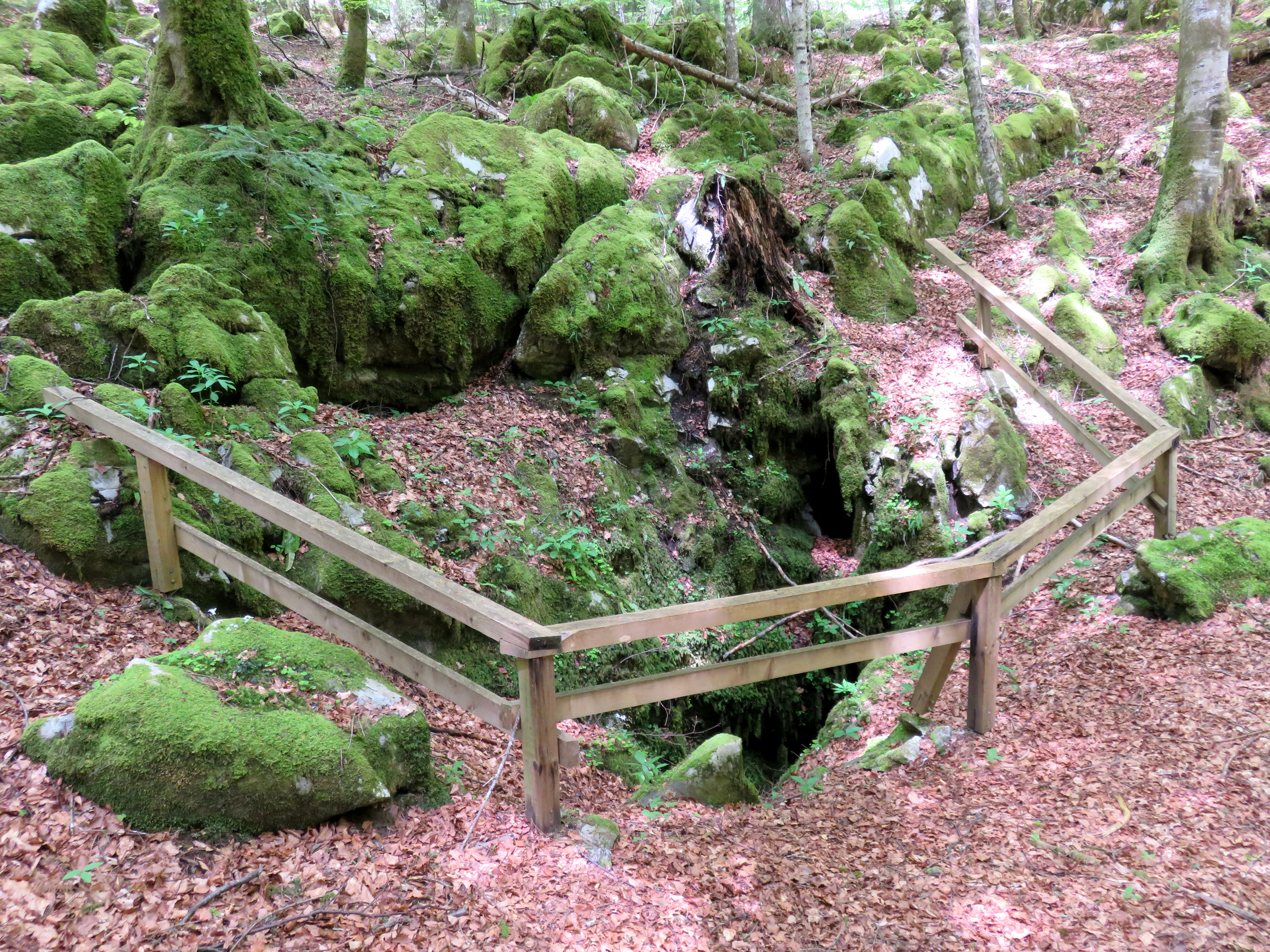
Konfin Shaft 2 Mass Grave

Glažuta is the site of two known mass graves from the period following the Second World War. Both graves contained the remains of prisoners of war murdered in June 1945. The Konfin Shaft 1 Mass Grave (Grobišče Brezno pri Konfinu 1) is located on the northern edge of a large sinkhole, below the forest railway and about 100 m from the road. It contained the bodies of about 88 Slovene, Croatian, and Serbian prisoners of war that were brought to the site on 24 June 1945 from the Yugoslav Secret Police central prison and murdered. The Konfin Shaft 2 Mass Grave (Grobišče Brezno pri Konfinu 2) is located just south of the Konfin Shaft 1 Mass Grave, on the northern edge of another large sinkhole, about 150 meters (490 ft) from the Konfin Shaft. It contained the bodies of wounded Home Guard prisoners that were brought to the site on 22 and 24 June 1945 from the Yugoslav Secret Police central prison and from the St. Stanislaus Institute in Ljubljana and murdered. The graves were excavated in 2006; after forensic procedures were completed, the remains were buried at the cemetery in Prigorica in 2017.

== Chapel ==
There is a small wooden chapel in the settlement. It is dedicated to the Sacred Heart of Jesus and belongs to the Parish of Dolenja Vas. It was built in 1926.
