= Srednja Vas v Bohinju =

Village in Upper Carniola, Slovenia

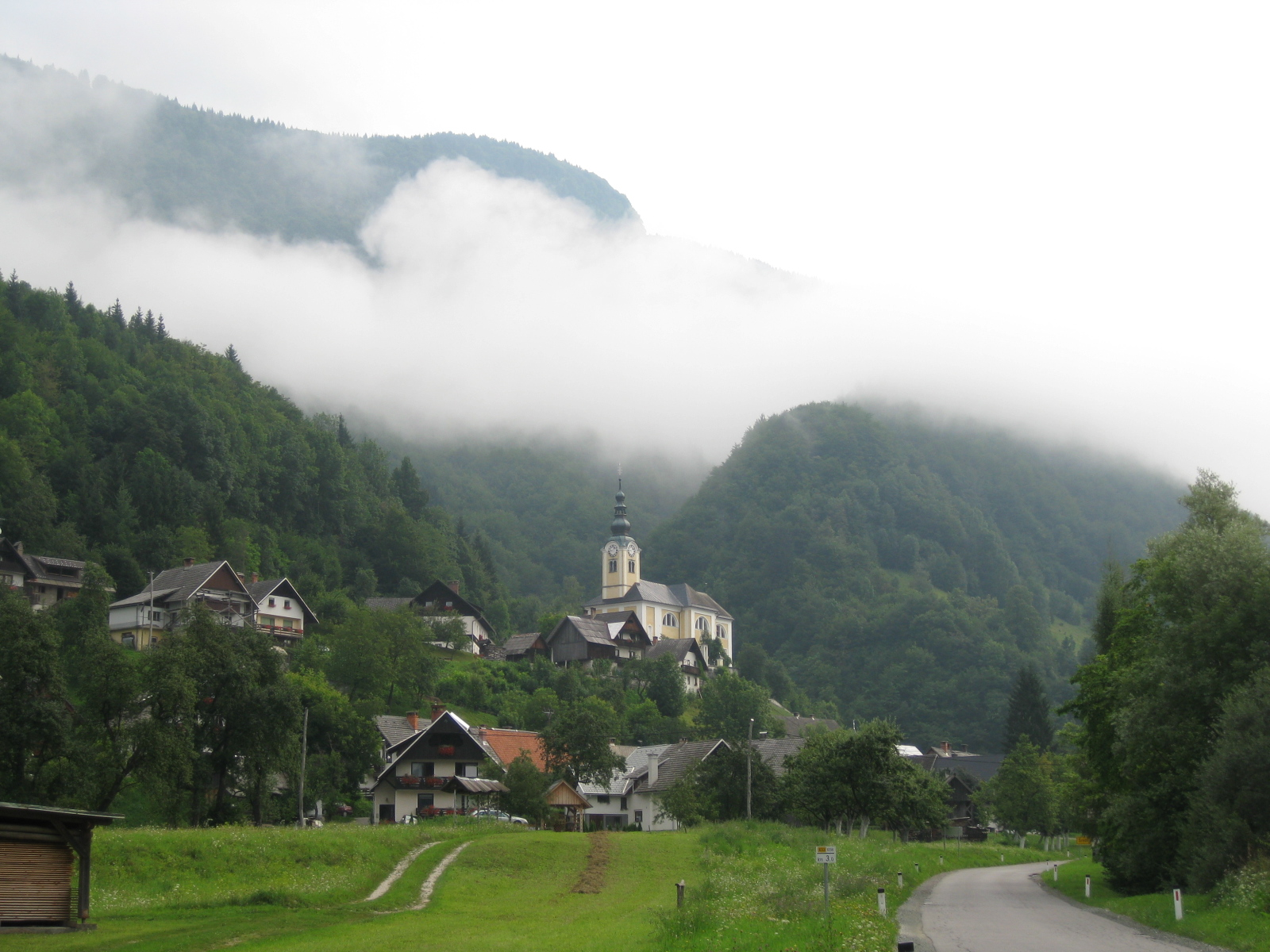

- Location in Slovenia
- Coordinates: 46°17′50.88″N 13°55′33.58″E
- Country: Slovenia
- Traditional region: Upper Carniola
- Statistical region: Upper Carniola
- Municipality: Bohinj
- Elevation: 593.8 m (1,948 ft)

Population (2020)
  - Total: 493

Srednja Vas v Bohinju (pronounced [ˈsɾéːdnja ˈʋáːs w bɔˈxíːnju]; Slovene: Srednja vas v Bohinju) is a village in the Municipality of Bohinj in the Upper Carniola region of Slovenia. It includes the hamlets of Kranjska Vas, Rudno Polje, V Renčah, Žale, Podojnica, Peca, Tržič, and Ptonec.

== Geography ==
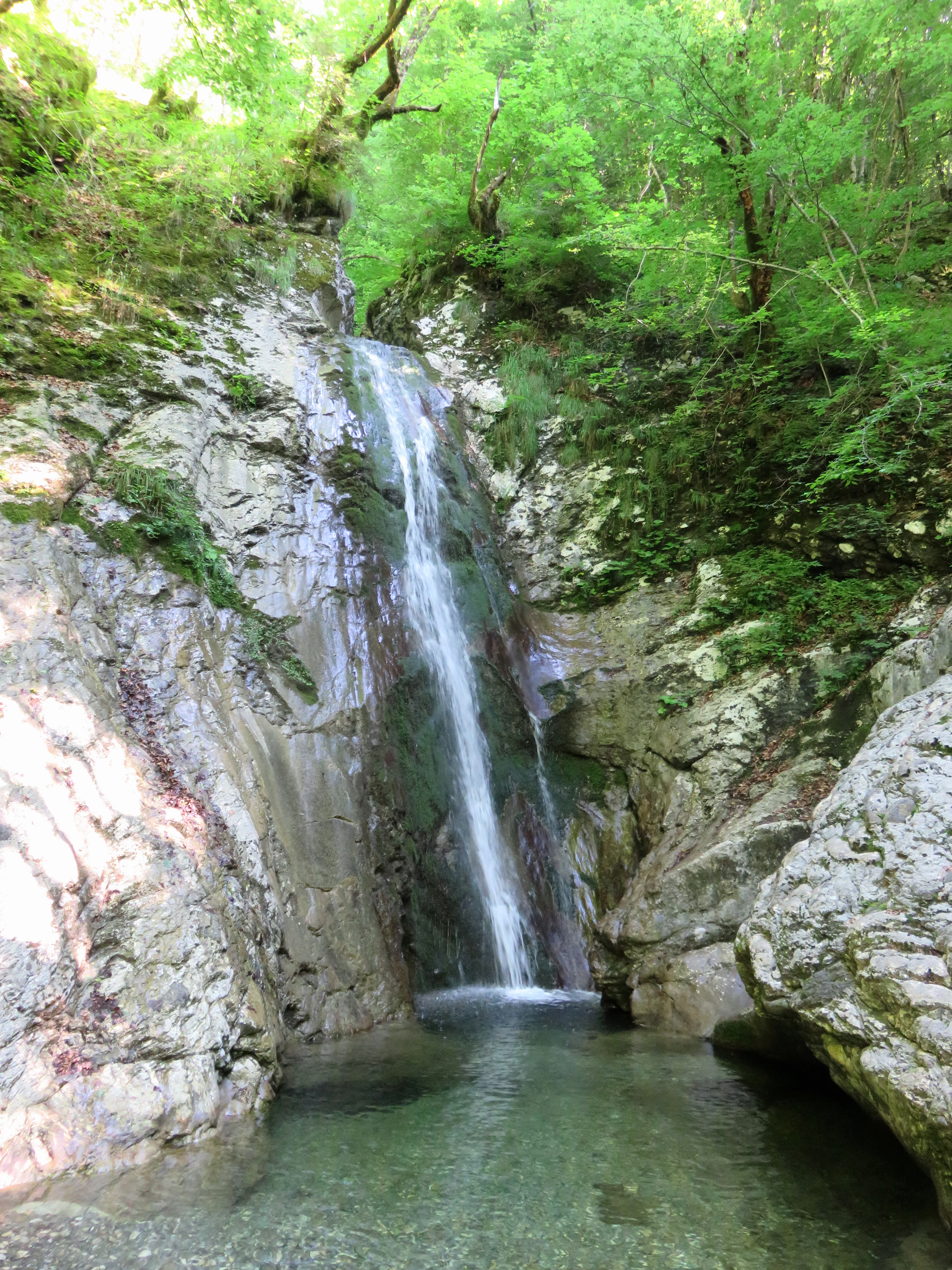
Lower Ribnica Falls

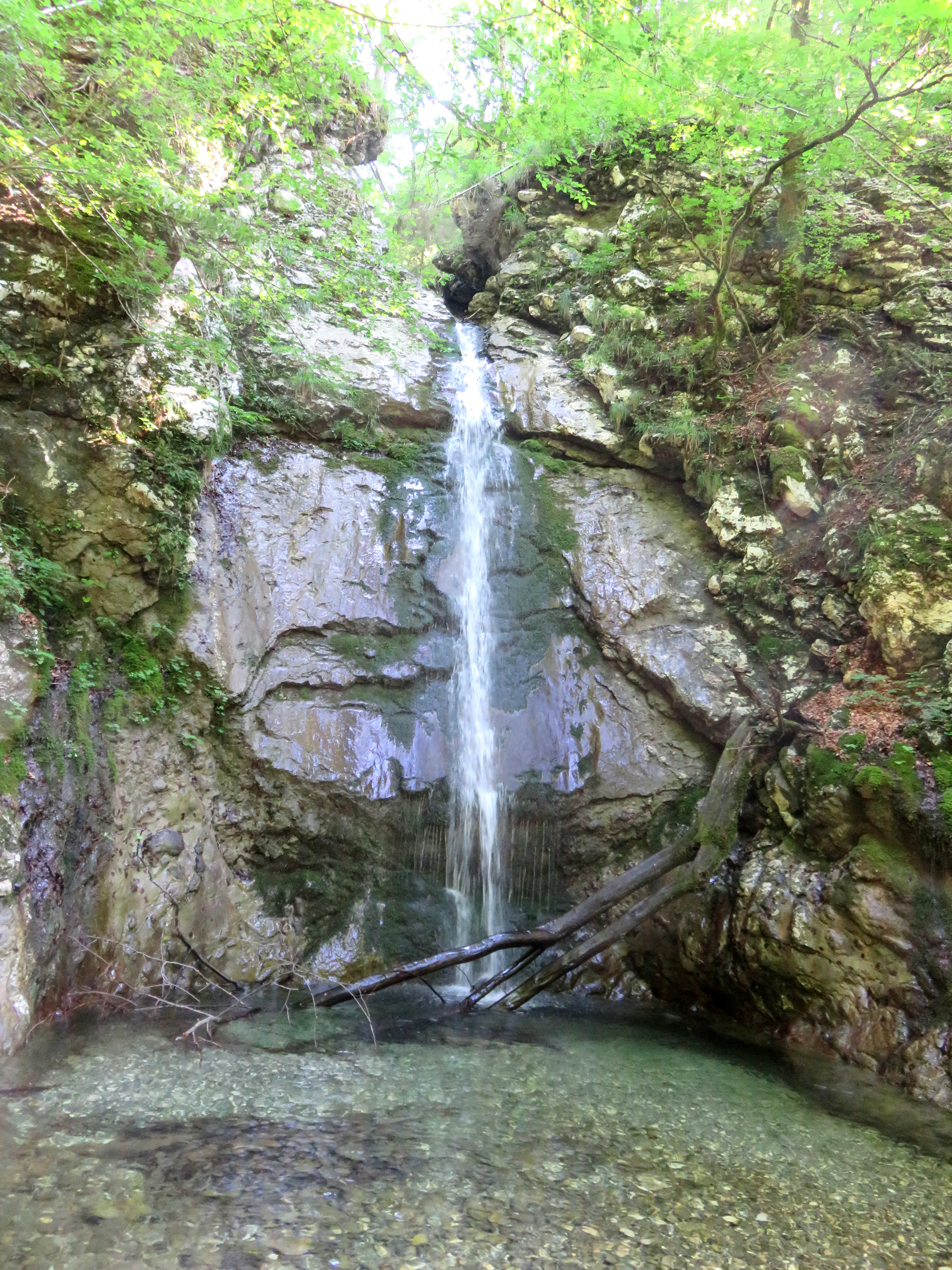
Upper Ribnica Falls

The territory of Srednja Vas v Bohinju extends northward from the village core in the south, along either side of the valley of Ribnica Creek to the western edge of the Pokljuka Plateau, with the Zajamniki, Praprotnica, and Uskovnica mountain pastures and the mountains above the Ore Valley (Slovene: Rudna dolina), including Mount Viševnik (2,030 meters or 6,660 feet). There are waterfalls on Ribnica Creek.

== Church ==
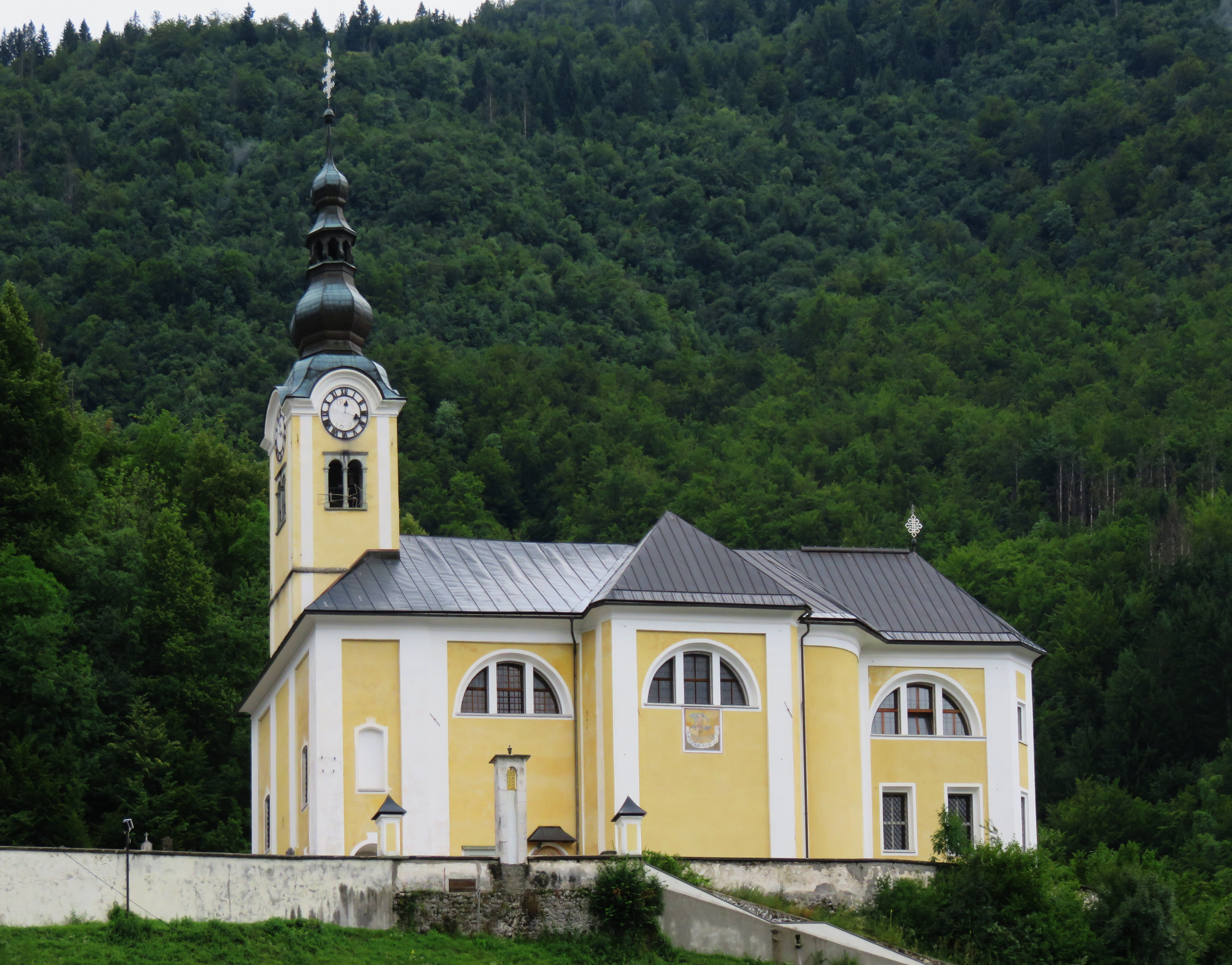
Saint Martin's Church

The parish church in the village is dedicated to Saint Martin. It is a Baroque church built over medieval foundations. The church has a fresco behind the main altar painted by Franc Jelovšek in 1755 and two additional exterior frescoes by Jelovšek. Other frescoes and paintings in the church were created by Matija Koželj (1842–1917) and Matevž Langus (1792–1855).
