= Retnje =

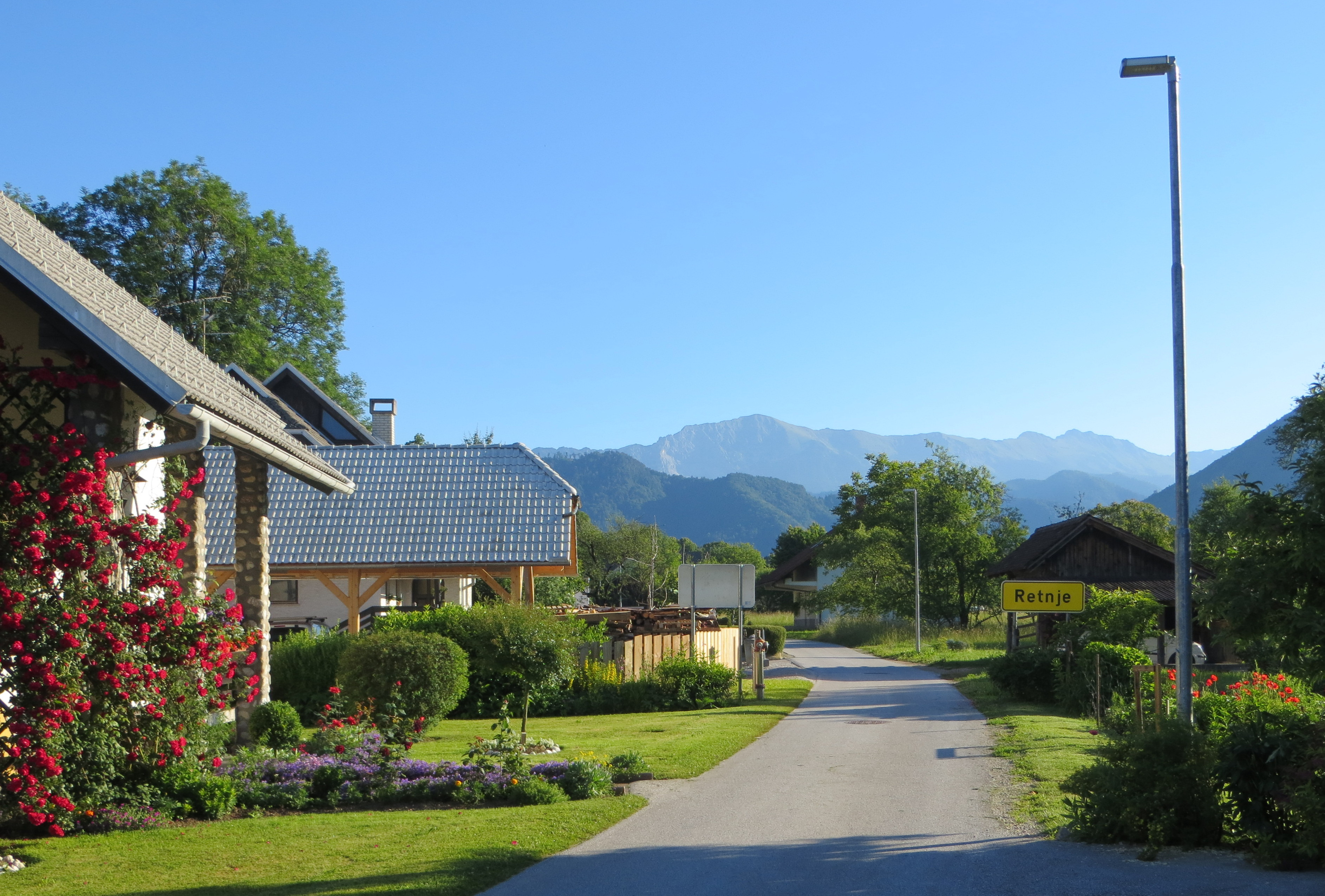

- Location in Slovenia
- Coordinates: 46°19′53.78″N 14°17′21.37″E
- Country: Slovenia
- Traditional region: Upper Carniola
- Statistical region: Upper Carniola
- Municipality: Tržič
- Elevation: 492.5 m (1,616 ft)

Population (2002)
  - Total: 278

Retnje (pronounced [ˈɾeːtnjɛ]) is a settlement in the Municipality of Tržič in the Upper Carniola region of Slovenia.
