= Jelendol, Škocjan =

Jelendol
- Location in Slovenia
- Coordinates: 45°56′48.18″N 15°17′25.21″E
- Country: Slovenia
- Traditional region: Lower Carniola
- Statistical region: Southeast Slovenia
- Municipality: Škocjan

Area
  - Total: 1.58 km^{2} (0.61 sq mi)
- Elevation: 330.9 m (1,086 ft)

Population (2002)
  - Total: 34

Jelendol (pronounced [ˈjeːlɛndɔl] or [ˈjɛːlɛndɔl]) is a small settlement in the hills north of Škocjan in the Municipality of Škocjan in southeastern Slovenia. Within the municipality, it belongs to the Village Community of Dole. The area is part of the historical region of Lower Carniola. The municipality is now included in the Southeast Slovenia Statistical Region.

== Notable people ==
Notable people that were born or lived in Jelendol include:

- Stanislav Hočevar (born 1945), Archbishop of Belgrade
