= Dolenja Vas, Ribnica =

Dolenja Vas
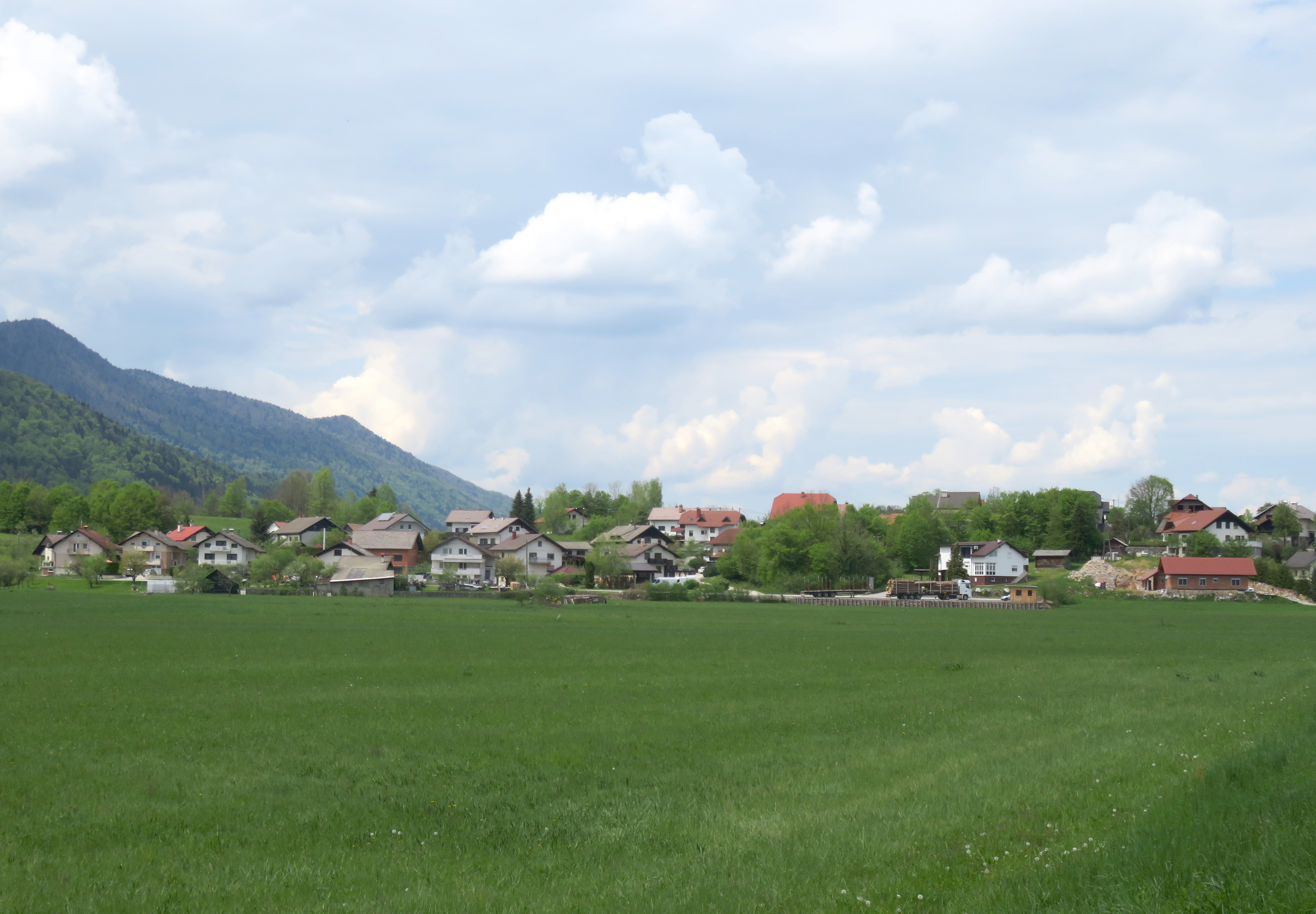

- Location in Slovenia
- Coordinates: 45°42′24.34″N 14°45′11.77″E
- Country: Slovenia
- Traditional region: Lower Carniola
- Statistical region: Southeast Slovenia
- Municipality: Ribnica

Area
  - Total: 12.24 km^{2} (4.73 sq mi)
- Elevation: 496.4 m (1,629 ft)

Population (2002)
  - Total: 794
- Postal code: 1331

Dolenja Vas (pronounced [dɔˈleːnja ˈʋaːs]; Slovene: Dolenja vas, German: Niederdorf) is a village in the Municipality of Ribnica in southern Slovenia. The area is part of the traditional region of Lower Carniola and is now included in the Southeast Slovenia Statistical Region.

== Church ==
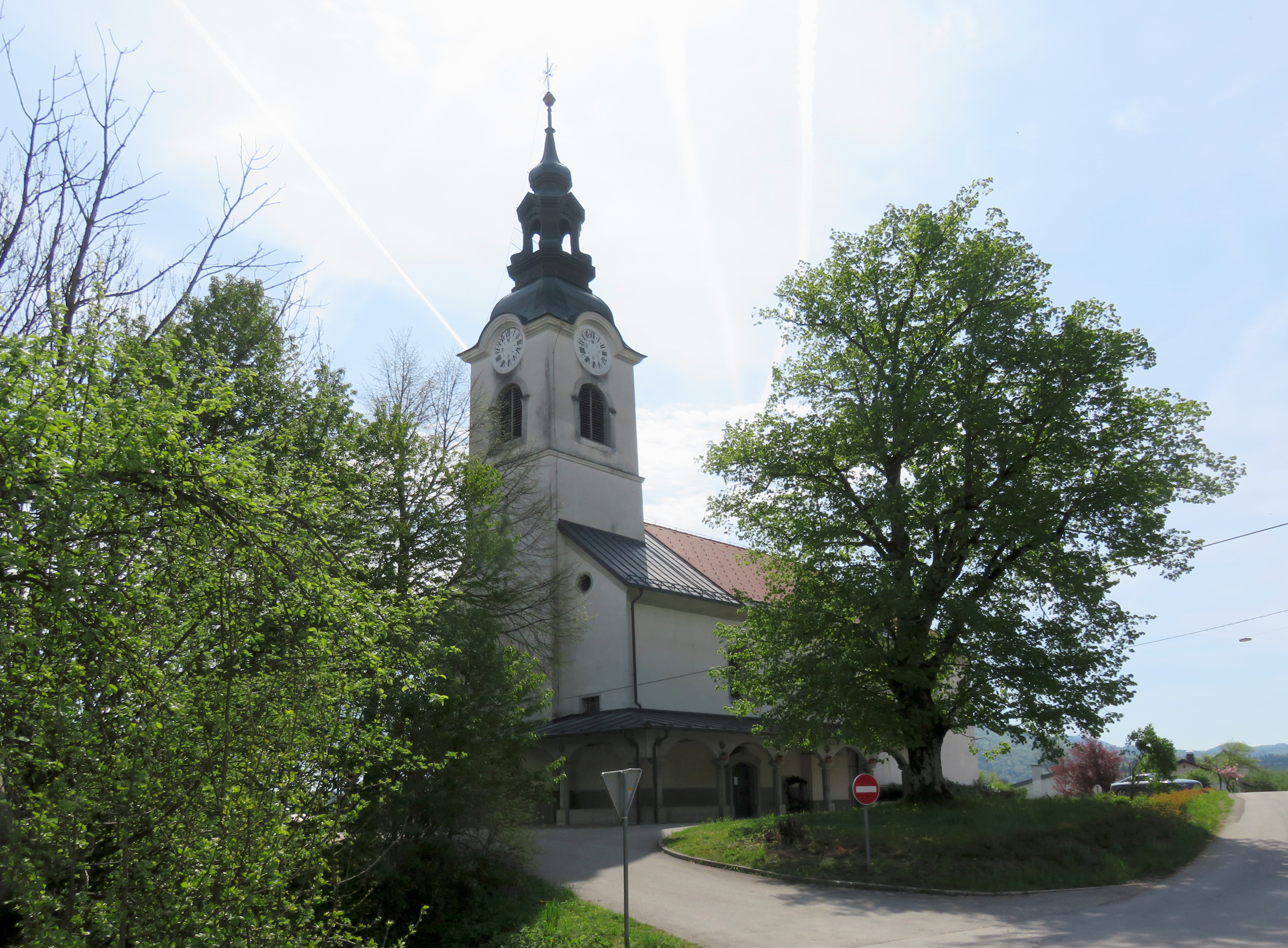
Saint Roch's Church

The local parish church, built on a slight elevation in the western part of the settlement, is dedicated to Saint Roch (Slovene: sveti Rok) and belongs to the Roman Catholic Archdiocese of Ljubljana. It was built in 1818. A chapel dedicated to Saint Margaret, outside the settlement to the east, is the converted surviving sanctuary of a larger 16th-century church, belonging to the same parish.
