= Ribnica, Ribnica =

Ribnica
- Town
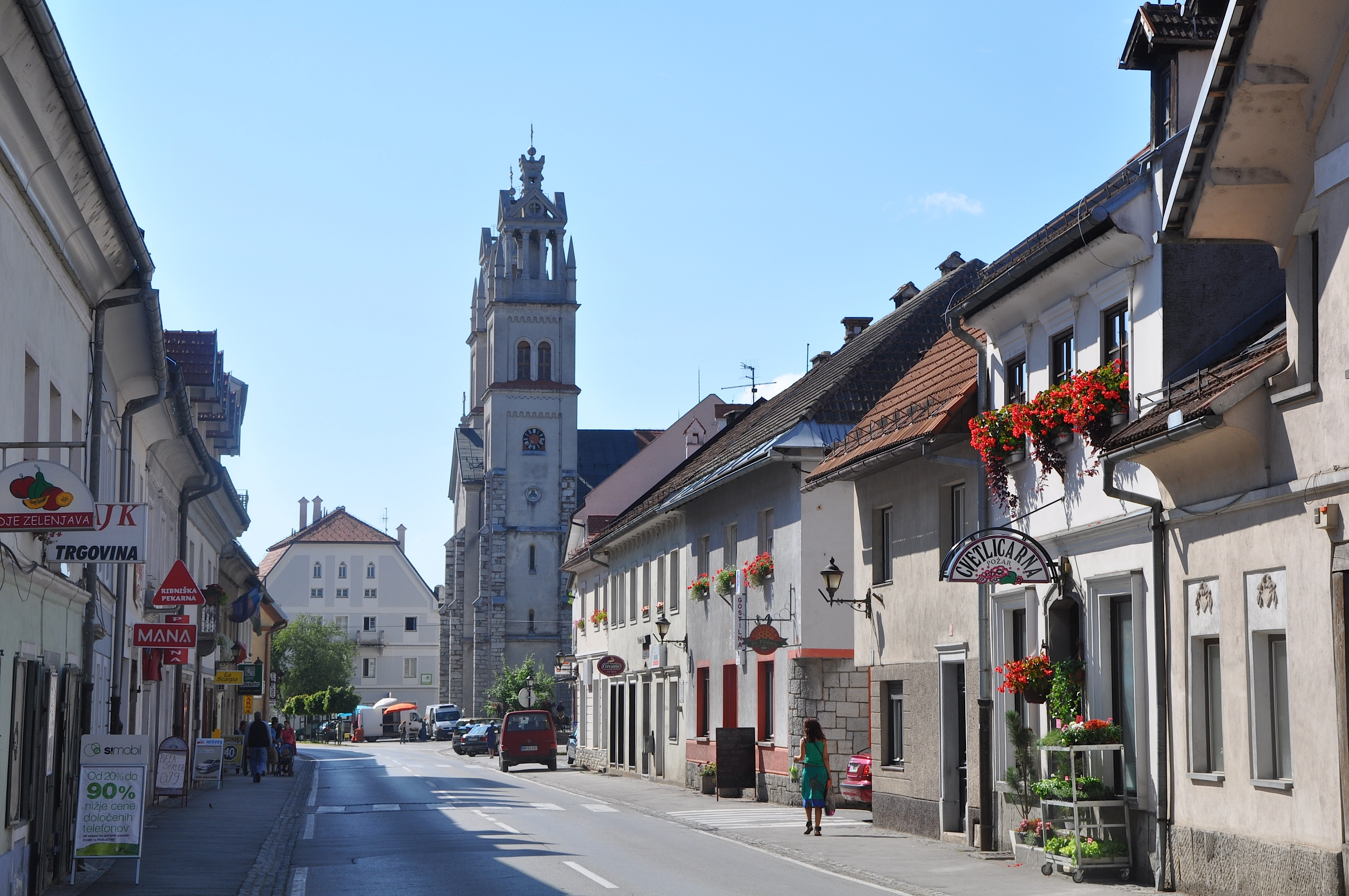
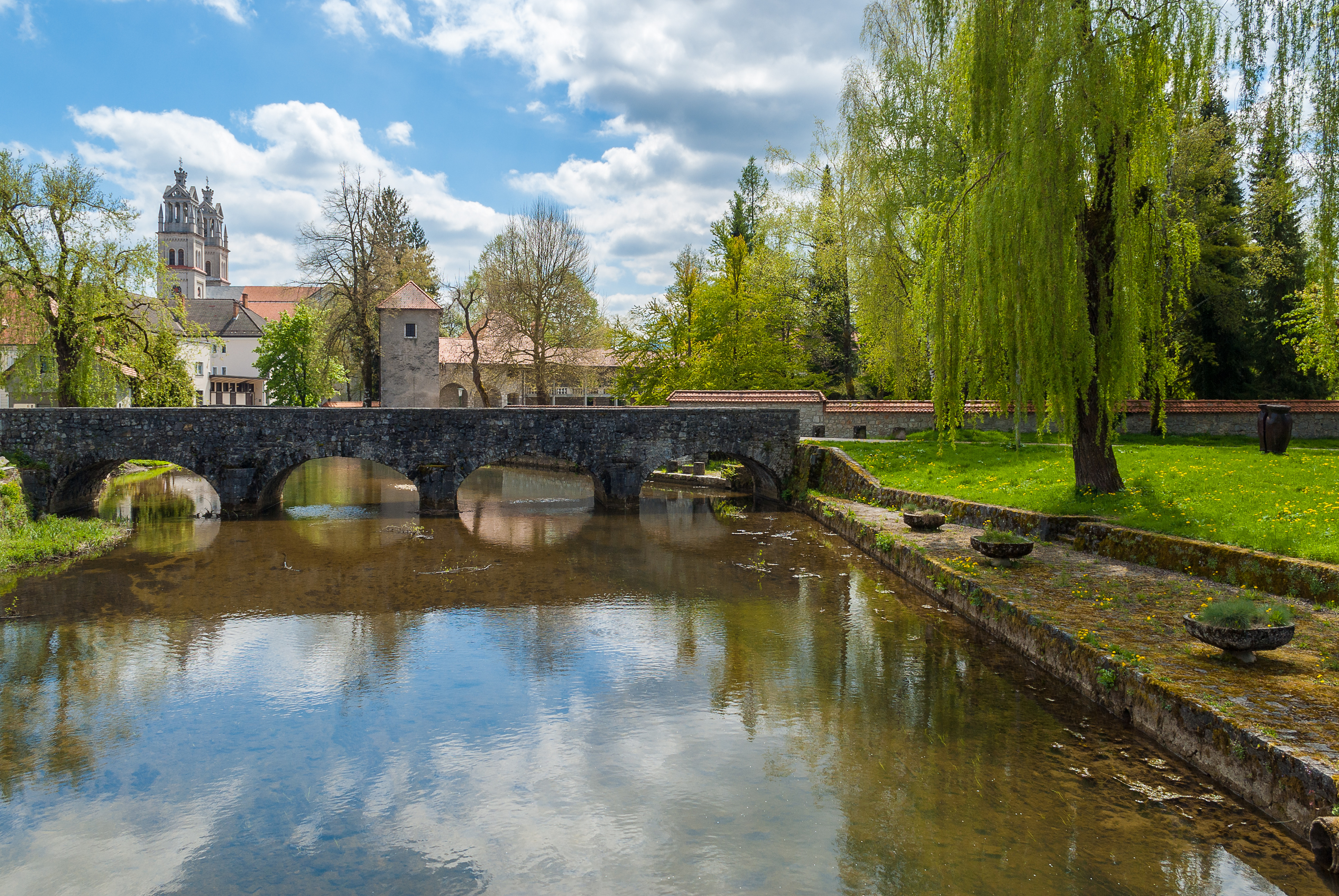
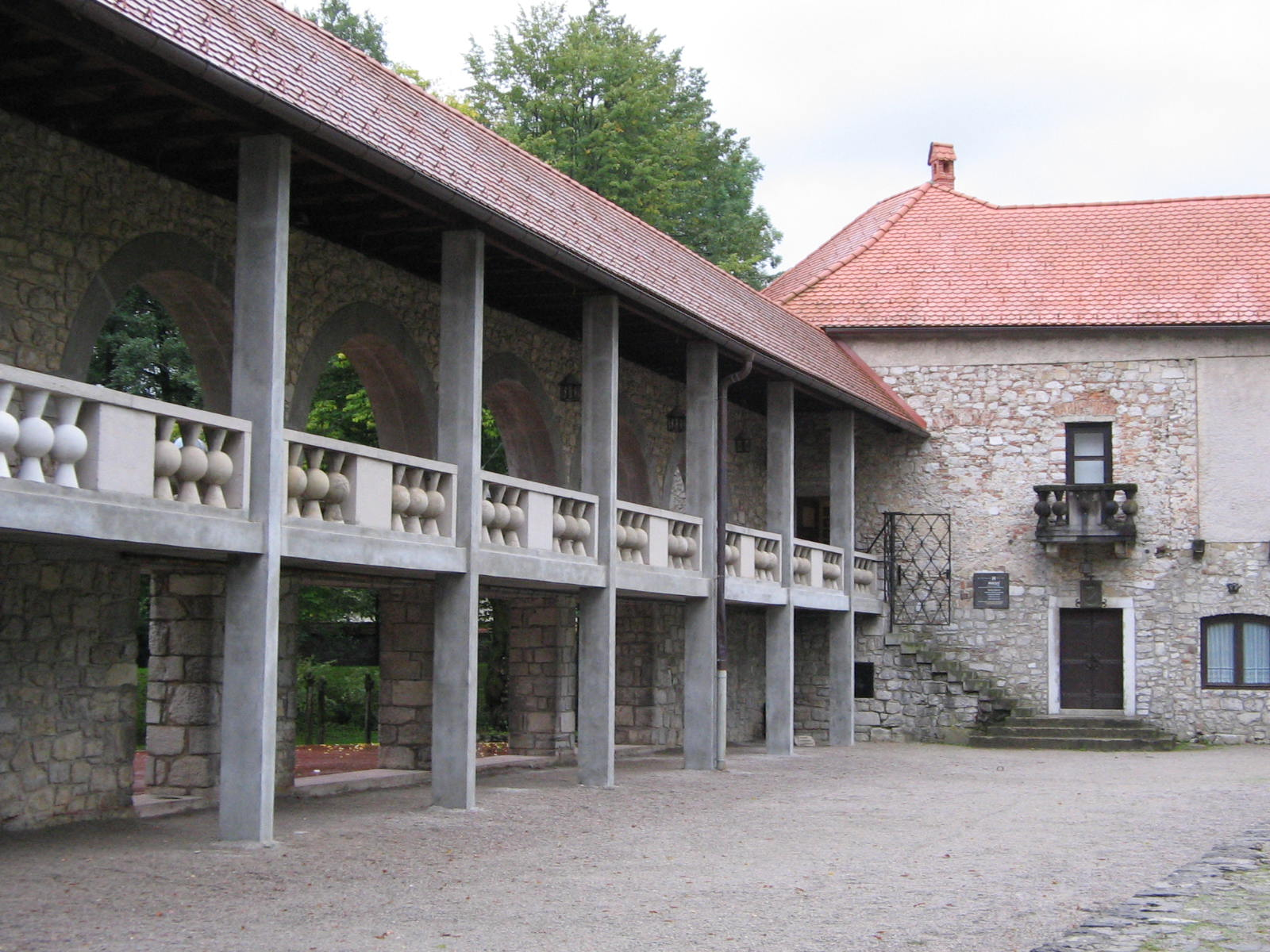
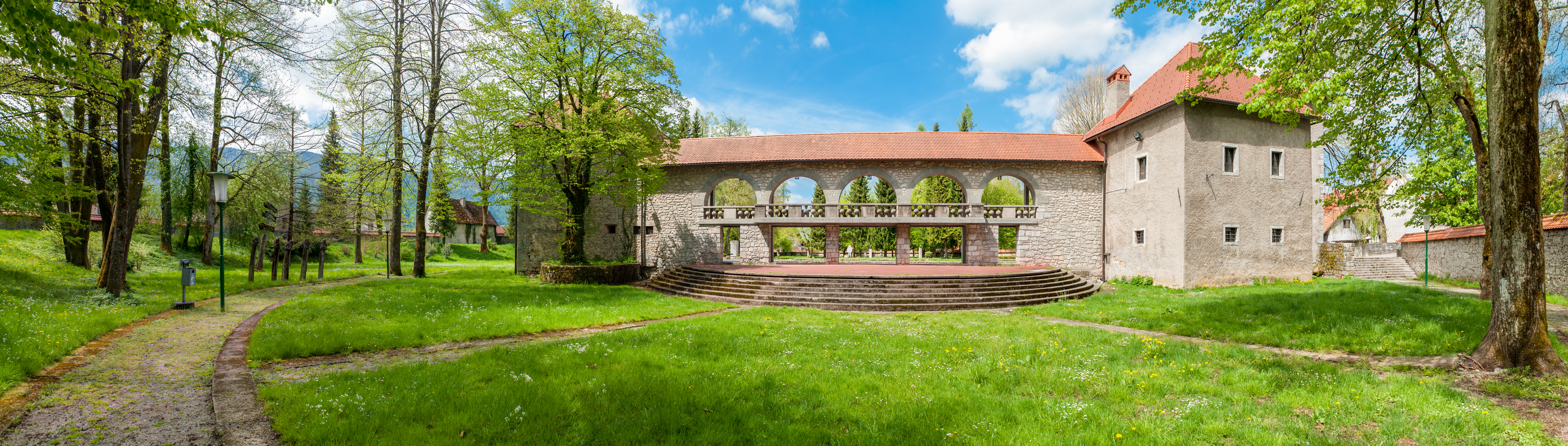
- From top, left to right: Main street with St. Stephen's Church, French Bridge, Castle Courtyard, Ribnica Castle

- Flag Coat of arms

- Location in Slovenia
- Coordinates: 45°44′24″N 14°43′51″E
- Country: Slovenia
- Traditional region: Lower Carniola
- Statistical region: Southeast Slovenia
- Municipality: Ribnica

Area
  - Total: 12.71 km^{2} (4.91 sq mi)
- Elevation: 492 m (1,614 ft)

Population (2020)
  - Total: 3,612
  - Density: 284.2/km^{2} (736.0/sq mi)
- Postal code: 1310
- Vehicle registration: LJ

Ribnica (pronounced [ˈɾíːbnitsa]; German: Reifnitz) is a town in the Municipality of Ribnica in southern Slovenia. It is the seat of the municipality. It is part of the traditional region of Lower Carniola and is now included in the Southeast Slovenia Statistical Region.

== Name ==
Ribnica was attested in written sources in 1220 as Rewenitz (and as Reiwencz and Reifenitz in 1241, Reiuenz in 1263, Reyuinz in 1303, and Reyfniz in 1327). The name was originally a hydronym derived from the common noun riba 'fish', thus referring to a stream with many fish and, by extension, a settlement along such a stream. In the past, the settlement was known as Reifnitz in German, and in the local dialect it is known as Rîbənca.

== History ==
Archaeological evidence shows that the area has been settled at least since the late Bronze Age between 1300 and 900 BC. It is first mentioned as Rewenicz in written documents dating to 1220, making it one of the oldest towns in Slovenia.

=== Mass grave ===
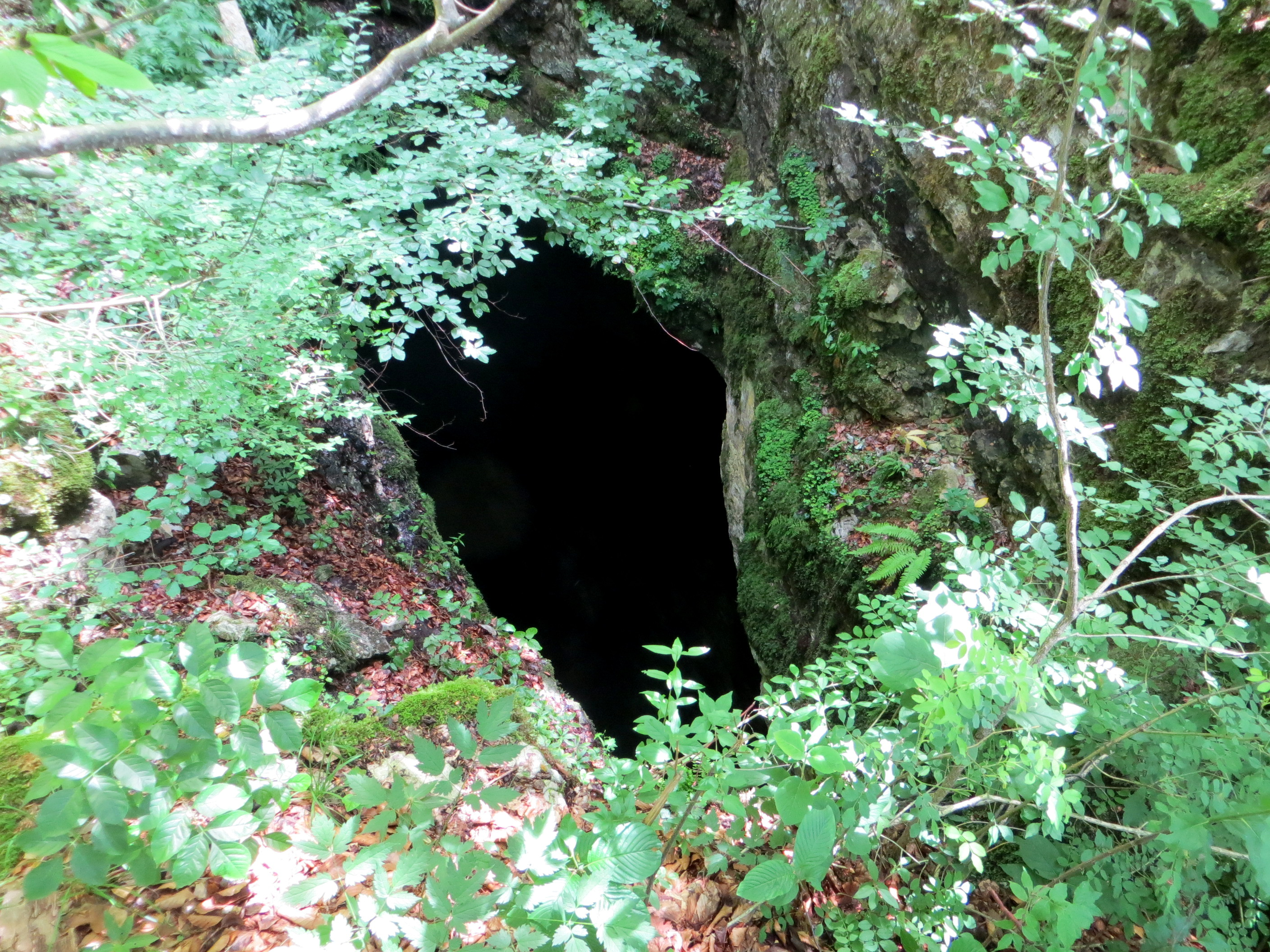
Žiglovica Cave

Ribnica is the site of a mass grave associated with the Second World War. The Žiglovica Cave Mass Grave (Slovene: Grobišče Jama Žiglovica) is located northeast of the town, in a former hay field on a slope overgrown with grass and sparse woods. It contains the remains of 14 civilians from Prigorica, Žlebič, and Pri Cerkvi–Struge that were murdered on 28 July 1942. The men were abducted by a Partisan patrol while clearing woods along the railway. Some of the victims were thrown into the shaft alive, and one of them managed to pull a Partisan in with him. After the murders, the local Partisan political activist insisted that the men had merely been sent to White Carniola for punitive labor, but the murders were acknowledged by some of the Partisan participants.

Historical population
Year	Pop.	±%
1948	1,466	—
1953	1,750	+19.4%
1961	2,001	+14.3%
1971	2,408	+20.3%
1981	3,009	+25.0%
1991	3,316	+10.2%
2002	3,480	+4.9%
2011	3,604	+3.6%
2021	3,671	+1.9%
Population size may be affected by changes in administrative divisions.

== Landmarks ==
=== St. Stephen's Parish Church ===
The parish church in the settlement is dedicated to Saint Stephen and belongs to the Roman Catholic Archdiocese of Ljubljana. It was built between 1865 and 1868 and has a double belfry that was only completed after 1957 based on an idea by the architect Jože Plečnik.

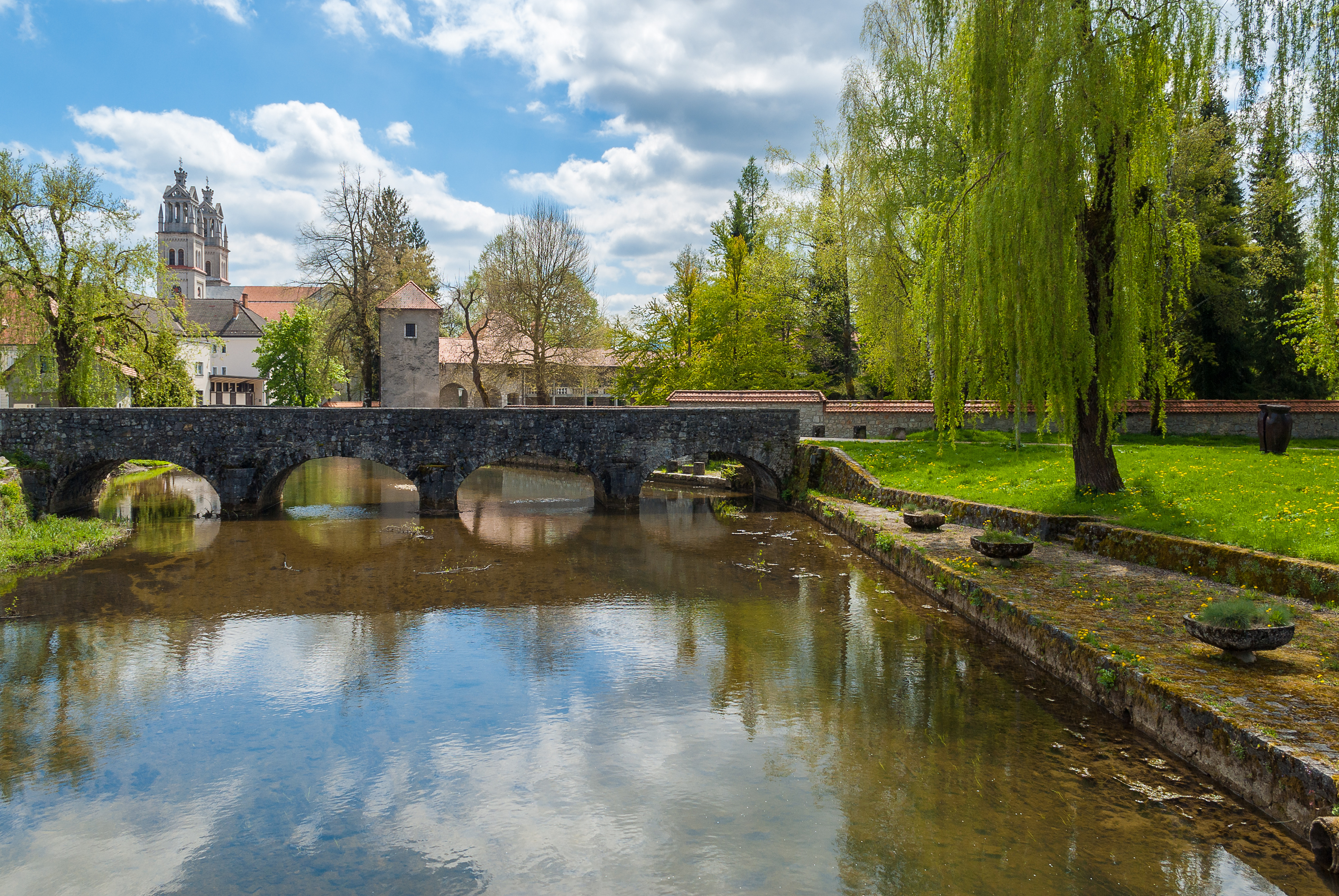
The French Bridge over the Bistrica River

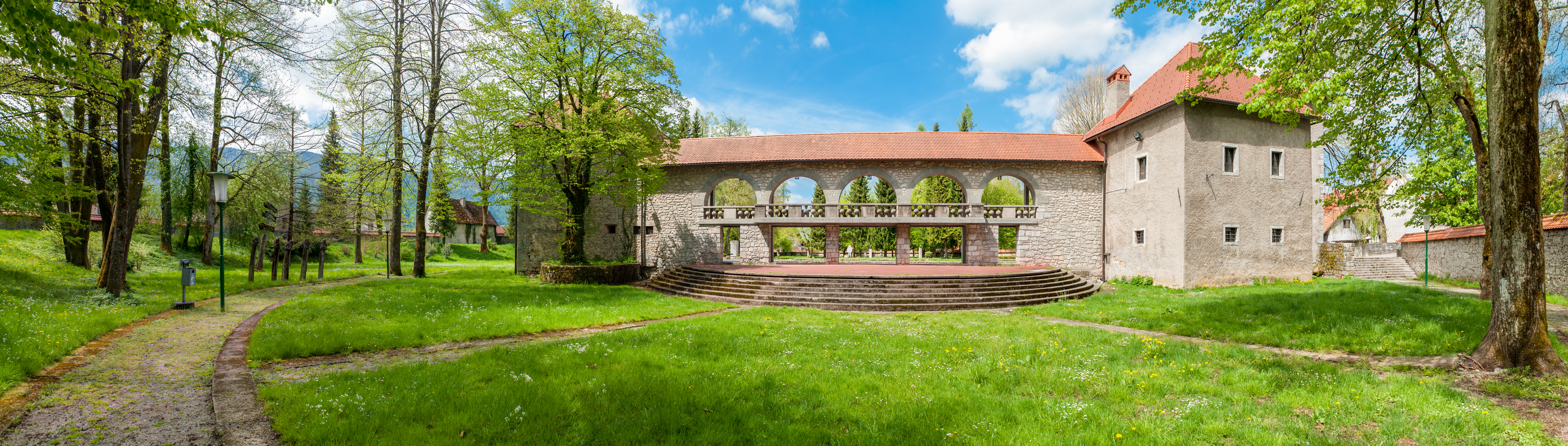
Ribnica Castle

== Notable people ==
Notable people that were born or lived in Ribnica include:

- Bojan Adamič (1912–1995), composer (born in Ribnica)
- Jacobus Gallus (1550–1591), composer (presumed born in Ribnica)
- France Prešeren (1800–1849), poet (studied in Ribnica)
- Jože Rus (1888–1945), geographer and historian
- Simona Škrabec (born 1968), translator, essayist, and literary historian (spent her childhood in Ribnica)
- Ivan Šušteršič (1863–1925), conservative politician (born in Ribnica)
