= List of German names for places in Slovenia =

This is a list of German language names for places located in Slovenia. Slovenia was formerly controlled by the German-speaking country Austria, so historical Austrian districts are also listed.

== History ==
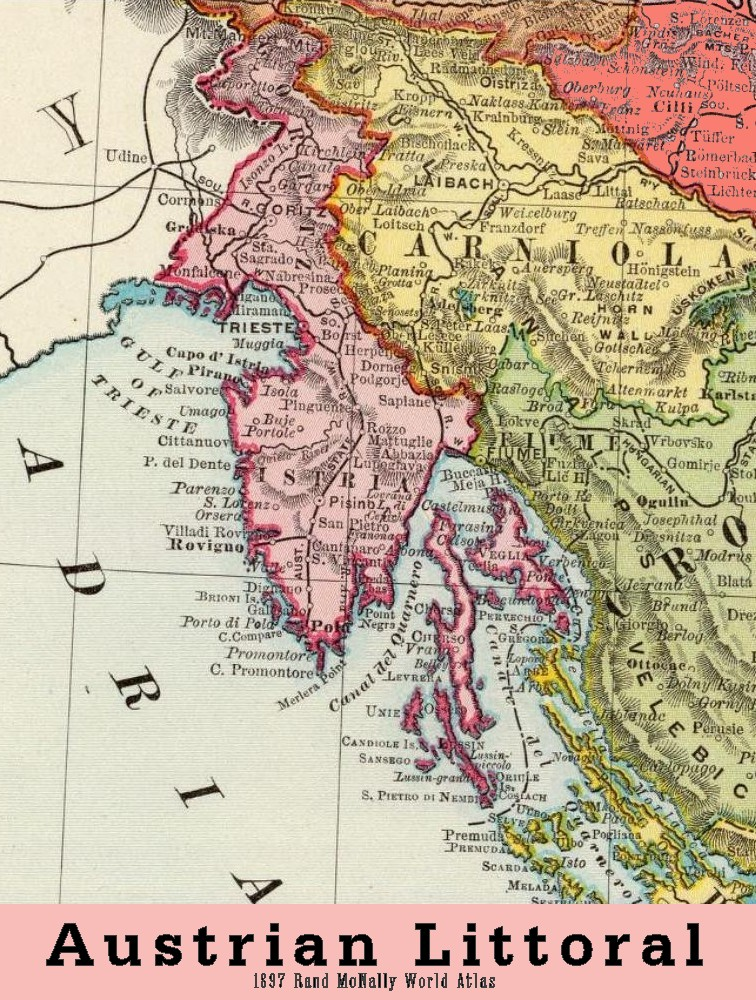
A large part of Slovenia is represented here in 1897

Until 1866, the only official language used in the Austrian Empire's administration was German. Several locations had an additional German name, some of which were Germanized versions of the original Slavic names; others had only a German name.

The compromise of 1867 (which became a law in 1871) marked the start of a recognition of areas where an important proportion of another language was used.

Many towns and villages received another name after 1867, except where there was a German-speaking majority.

== List of names ==
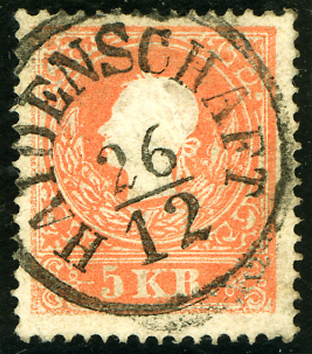
Ajdovščina - Haidenschaft in 1859

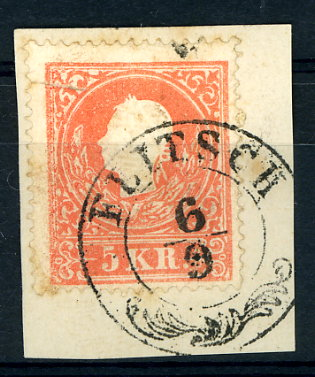
Bovec - Flitsch in 1859

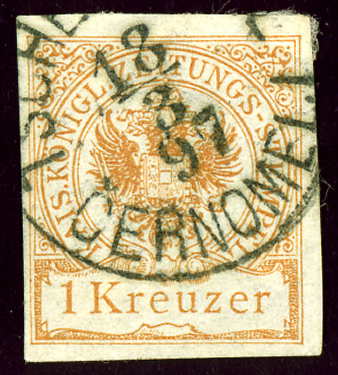
Tschernembl - Črnomelj in 1897

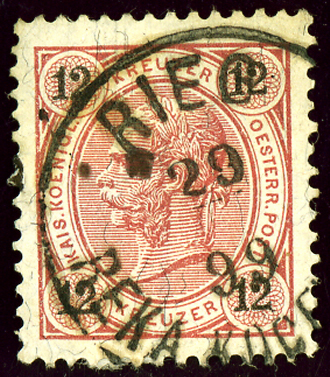
Rieg only before 1867

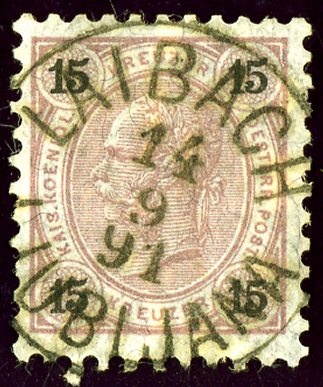
Laibach - Ljubliana, Bilingual in 1891

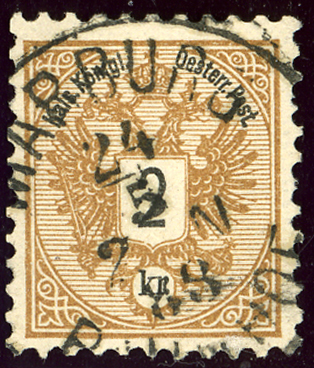
Maribor (Marbug)

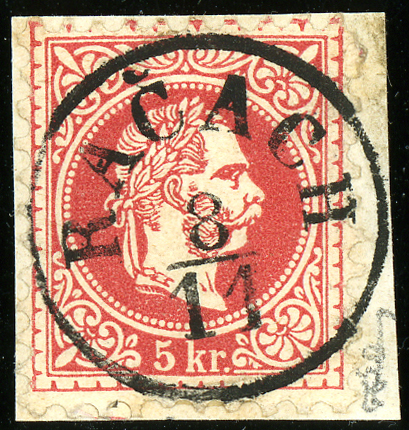
Early use of letter Č, bilingual named Ratschach - Radeče later

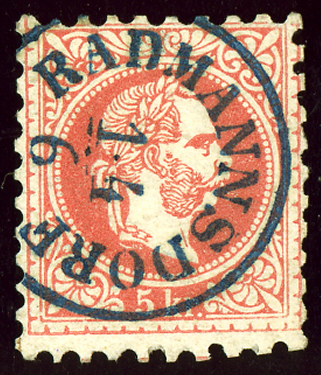
Radmannsdorf - Radovljica, end of the 1860s, bilingual after

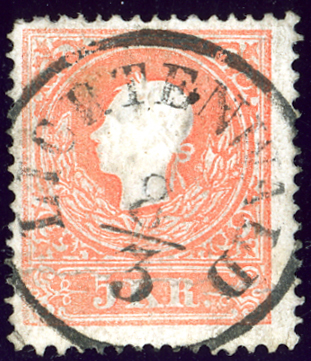
Sevnica (Rann)

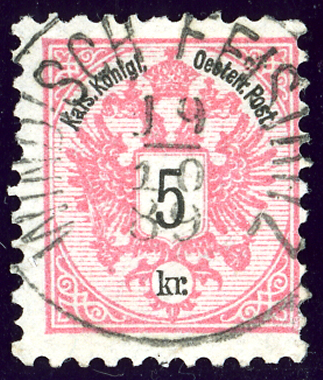
Windisch Feistritz (Marbug)

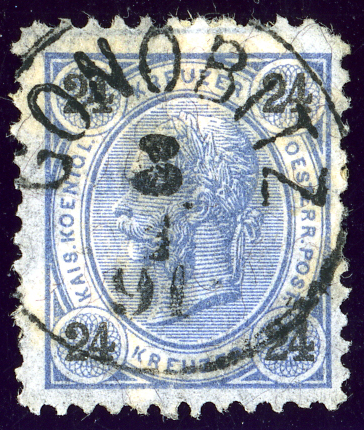
Slovenske Konjice (Cilli)

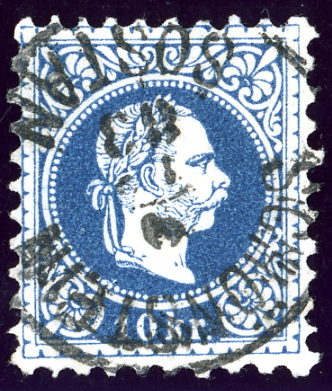
Šoštanj, 1883 bilingual (Windischgrätz)

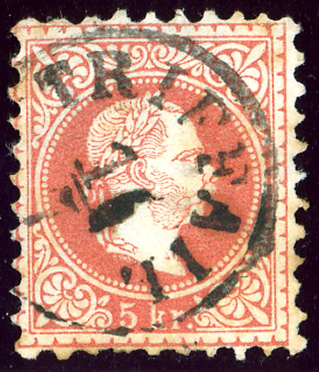
Trbovlje, bilingual at the end of the 19th c. (Cilli)

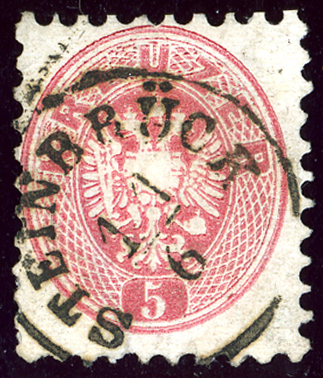
Zidani Most (Cilli)

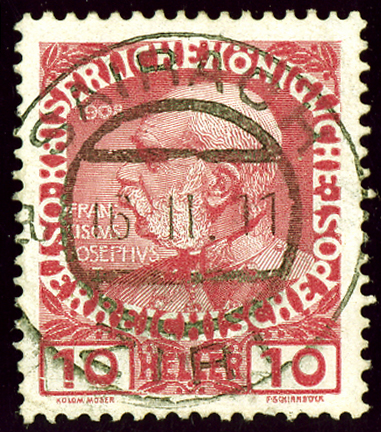
Sairach - Ziri in 1911

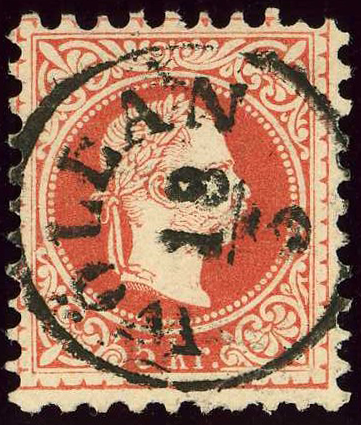
German WÖLLAN in Velenje in 1874ca

Slovenia Slowenien
Slovenian place	German name	Austrian district	Notes
Ajdovščina	Haidenschaft	Görz	
Apače	Abstall	Radkersburg	
Artiče	Artitsch bei Rann		
Begunje pri Cerknici	Vigaun bei Zirknitz	Loitsch	
Begunje na Gorenjskem (earlier Begunje pri Lescah)	Vigaun bei Lees (Vigaun before 1896)	Radmannsdorf	
Bela Cerkev na Dolenjskem	Weißkirchen in Krain (in Steiermark, bei Judenburg)	St,8	
Beltinci	Fellsdorf		
Bistrica pri Mariboru	Feistritz bei Marburg (earlier bei Lembach)	Marbug	
Bizeljsko	Wisell (zu Suschitz)	Rann	
Blanca	Blanca bei Lichtenwald	Rann	
Blatnik pri Črmošnjicah	Russbach		
Bled	Veldes	Radmannsdorf	
Bohinj	Wochein		
Bohinjska Bela	Wocheiner Vellach		
Bohinjska Bistrica	Wocheiner Feistritz	Radmannsdorf	
Borovnica	Franzdorf	Laibach	
Bovec	Flitsch	Tolmein	
Braslovče	Frasslau	Cilli	
Brezje pri Trebelnem	Bresiach		
Brezje pri Rožnem Dolu	Wretzen bei Tschermoschnitz		
Brezno	Fresen	Windischgrätz	
Brezovica	Bresowitz bei Laibach	Laibach	
Brežice	Rann	Rann	
Brusnice	Wrußnitz	Rudolfswerth	
Buče	Fautsch		
Cankova	Kaltenbrunn		
Cenkova	Zenkau		
Celje	Cilli	Cilli	
Cerklje na Gorenjskem	Zirklach	Krainburg	
Cerknica	Zirknitz	Loitsch	
Cerkvenjak	Kirchberg in Windisch-Büheln	Marbug	
Cirkovci	Zirkowetz		
Cven	Zween		
Črmošnjice, Semič (Cermosnice)	Tschermoschnitz	Rudolfswerth	
Črna pri Prevaljah	Schwarzenbach bei Prävali		
Črnomelj	Tschernembl	Tschernembl	
Črnci	Schirmdorf		
Devica Marija v Polju	Mariafeld in Krain		
Dob pri Domžalah	Aich bei Laibach	Stein in Krain	
Dobrna	Neuhaus bei Cilli	Cilli	
Dobrniče	Döbernig (Döbernik)	Rudolfswerth	
Dobrova pri Ljubljani	Dobrowa (Dobrova) bei Laibach	Laibach	
Dol pri Hrastniku	Dol bei Hrastnigg		
Dol pri Ljubljani	Lusttal (Lustthal in Krain, bei Laase)	Stein in Krain	
Dole pri Litiji	Mariatal bei Littei (Mariathal bei Littai)	Littai	
Dolenja Hrušica	Unter-Birnbaum		
Dolenja Vas pri Ribnici	Niederdorf bei Reifnitz	Gottschee	
Dolenji Logatec	Unter Loitsch (Loitsch before 1867)	Loitsch	
Domžale	Domseldorf		
Donja Lendava, Lendava	Unterlimbach, Lindau		
Dovje	Lengenfeld	Radmannsdorf	
Draga pri Rakeku	Suchen	Gottschee	
Dragatuš	Dragatusch	Tschernembl	
Dramlje	Trennenberg	Cilli	
Dravograd	Unterdrauburg	Wolfsberg	
Drobtinci	Proskersdorf		
Dvor	Hof in Krain (Hof bei Seisenberg)	Rudolfswerth	
Fala	Faal	Marbug	
Fara pri Kočevju	Fara in Krain		
Fram	Frauheim (bei Kranichsfeld)	Marbug	
Gomilsko	Gomilsko	Cilli	
Gorenji Logatec	Ober-Loitsch	Loitsch	
Gorenji Mozel	Ober-Mösel bei Gottschee	Gottschee	
Gorje pri Bledu (Gorenje Gorje)	Ober-Görjach bei Veldes	Radmannsdorf	
Gornja Lendava, Grad	Oberlimbach		
Gornja Radgona	Ober-Radkersburg		
Gornji Grad	Oberburg	Cilli	
Gradac pri Črnomlju	Gradatz in Krain	Tschernembl	
Grahovo pri Cerknici	Grahovo bei Zirknitz		
Griže	Greis bei Cilli	Cilli	
Grosuplje	Grosslupp	Laibach	
Guštanj	Gutenstein in Kärnten	Völkermakt	
Hajdoše	Siebendorf		
Haloze	Kollos		
Hoče	Kötsch	Marbug	
Hotedršica	Hotederschitz	Loitsch	
Hrastnik	Hrastnigg	Cilli	
Ilirska Bistrica	Illyrisch Feistritz	Adelsberg	
Ivanjci	Iswanzen	Luttenberg	
Ivanjkovci	Ivankofzen	Pettau	
Jarenina	Jahring	Marbug	
Javornik	Jauerburg	Radmannsdorf	
Jesenice Fužine	Aßling-Hütte		
Jesenice (Jesenice na Gorenskim)	Assling (in Krain)	Radmannsdorf	
Jesenice ob Savi (Jesenice na Dolenjskem)	Jessenitz an der Save (bei Landstrass)	Gurkfeld	
Jezersko (Zgornje Jezero)	Ober-Seeland	Völkermakt	
Ježica	Jeschza		
Jurklošter	Gairach	Cilli	
Juršinci	Jurschinzen	Pettau	
Kamna Gorica	Steinbüchel	Radmannsdorf	
Kamnik	Stein in Krain	Stein in Krain	
Kobarid	Karfreit	Tolmein	
Kočevje	Gottschee	Gottschee	
Kočevska Reka	Rieg	Gottschee	
Kočevske Poljane	Pölland bei Bischoflack	Krainburg	
Kokra	Kanker	Krainburg	
Komenda	Commenda St.Peter	Stein in Krain	
Konjice	Gonobitz	Cilli	
Koper	Gafers		
Koprivnica pri Brežicah	Kopreinitz in Steiermark	Rann	
Koprivnik pri Kočevju	Nesselthal	Gottschee	
Kostanjevica na Krki	Landstrass	Gurkfeld	
Kotlje	Köttelach	Völkermakt	
Kozje	Drachenburg	Rann	
Kandrše, Zagorje ob Savi + Kandrše, Litija	Kandersche		
Kranj	Krainburg	Krainburg	
Kranjska Gora	Kronau	Radmannsdorf	
Kresnice	Kressnitz / Kresznitz / Kreßnitz	Littai	
Križevci pri Ljutomeru	Kreuzdorf in Steiermark (Heiligenkreuz bei Luttenberg before 1896)	Luttenberg	
Krmelj	Karmel		
Kropa	Kropp	Radmannsdorf	
Krška Vas (Kerska Vas)	Munkendorf	Gurkfeld	
Krško	Gurkfeld	Gurkfeld	
Ksaverij v Savinjski Dolini	Sanct Xaveri im Sanntal (im Sannthale)	Cilli	
Laško	Tüffer		
Lenart	St. Leonhard in Windischbüheln (before 1896), in Steiermark	Marbug	
Lendava	Unter-Limbach, Lindau		
Lesce	Lees	Radmannsdorf	
Leskovec pri Krškem	Haselbach bei Gurkfeld (earlier in Krain)	Gurkfeld	
Libeliče	Leifling	Völkermakt	
Litija	Littai	Littai	
Ljubljana	Laibach	Laibach	
Ljubno	Laufen in Steiermark	Cilli	
Ljutomer	Luttenberg	Luttenberg	
Loče pri Poljčanah	Heiligengeist	Cilli	
Logatec	see Dolenji Logatec	Loitsch	
Loka pri Zidanem Mostu	Laak bei Steinbrück	Cilli	
Loka pri Žusmu	Laak bei Süßenheim	Cilli	
Loški Potok	Laserbach		
Lož	Laas (in Krain)	Loitsch	
Lučane	Leutschach	St,9	
Luče pri Ljubnem	Leutsch	Cilli	
Lukovica	Lukowitz	Stein in Krain	
Lutverci	Leitersdorf		
Makole (Makule)	Maxau	Marbug	
Mala Nedelja	Klein-Sonntag bei Luttenberg	Luttenberg	
Malošče	Mallestieg (Mallestig)	K,5	
Marenberg	Mahrenberg	Windischgrätz	
Maribor	Marburg (an der Drau)	Marbug	
Mavčiče	Mautschitsch		
Izlake (Medija)	Gallenegg-Islak (Islak before 1898)	Littai	
Medvode	Zwischenwässern	Laibach	
Mengeš	Mannsburg	Stein in Krain	
Metlika	Möttling (Moettling)	Tschernembl	
Meža	Miess an der Drau (Miss ad der Drau?	Windischgrätz)	
Mežica	Miess in Kärnten (Miess ob Prävali before 1883)	Völkermakt	
Mirna Peč	Hönigstein	Rudolfswerth	
Mirna	Neudegg in Krain	Rudolfswerth	
Mislinje	Missling in Sanct Leonhard	Windischgrätz	
Mokronog	Nassenfuss	Gurkfeld	
Moravče	Moräutsch	Stein in Krain	
Moste pri Ljubljani	Moste bei Laibach		
Moškanjci	Moschganzen	Pettau	
Motnik	Möttnig	Stein in Krain	
Mozirje	Prassberg	Cilli	
Murska Sobota	Olsnitz (Hungary)		
Muta	Hohenmauten (Hohenmauthen) in Steiermark	Windischgrätz	
Naklo	Naklas		
Nasova	Nassau		
Nemška Loka	Unter-Deutschau	Gottschee	
Nova Sela pri Kočevju	Nova Sela in Krain		
Nova Vas pri Rakeku	Neudorf bei Rakek	Loitsch	
Novo Mesto	Rudolfswerth (Rudolfovo)	Rudolfswerth	
Občicee	Krapflern		
Obrajna	Halbenrain	Radkersburg	
Oplotnica	Oplotnitz	Cilli	
Ormož	Friedau	Pettau	
Ortnek	Ortenegg	Gottschee	
Osilnica	Ossiunitz (bei Brood a.K.)	Gottschee	
Pesnica	Pössnitzhofen		
Petrovče	Maria-Pletrowitsch	Cilli	
Pilštanj	Peilenstein (in Steiermark)	Rann	
Pišece	Pischätz		
Planica (Radeče?)	Ratschach-Matten (bei Steinbrück?)	Gurkfeld?	
Planina pri Sevnici	Montpreis	Rann	
Podbrezje	Birkendorf (bei Podnart)	Krainburg	
Podčetrtek	Windisch-Landsberg	Rann	
Podgorje, Apače	Absberg		
Podlehnik	Lichtenegg in Steiermark	Pettau	
Podplat	Podplat bei Pöltschach	Pettau	
Podsreda	Hörberg	Rann	
Podstenice	Steinwand		
Polhov Gradec	Billichgratz (bei Laibach)	Laibach	
Poljane nad Škofjo Loko	Pölland bei Bischoflack	Krainburg	
Poljčane (Poličane)	Pöltschach	Marbug	
Polzela	Heilenstein	Cilli	
Ponikva, Šentjur	Ponigl	Cilli	
Ponikve, Semič	Sporeben		
Postojna	Adelsberg	Adelsberg	
Pragersko	Pragerhof	Marbug	
Preserje	Presser	Laibach	
Prevalje	Prävali	Völkermakt	
Pristava nad Stično	Pristova	Cilli	
Ptuj	Pettau	Pettau	
Ptujska Gora	Maria-Neustift	Pettau	
Pustrica	Pustritz	Völkermakt	
Račje	Kranichsfeld	Marbug	
Radeče	Ratschach (bei Steinbrück)	Gurkfeld	
Radlje ob Dravi	Marenberg		
Radna	Radna bei Lichtenwald	Gurkfeld	
Radovljica	Radmannsdorf	Radmannsdorf	
Rajhenburg	Reichenburg	Rann	
Raka	Arch (in Krain)	Gurkfeld	
Ravne na Koroškem	Gutenstein (in Kärnthen), Raun	Völkermakt	
Rečica na Paki	Rietzdorf (an der Pack)	Windischgrätz	
Rečica v Savinjski Dolini	Riez in Steiermark	Cilli	
Ribnica na Dolenjskem	Reifnitz	Gottschee?	
Ribnica na Pohorju	Reifnig in Steiermark (Reifnigg)	Windischgrätz	
Ribnica	Reifnitz	Gottschee	
Rimske Toplice	Römerbad (Tüffer?)	Cilli?	
Rogaška Slatina	Rohitsch-Sauerbrunn (Sauerbrunn before 1884)	Pettau	
Rogatec	Rohitsch	Pettau	
Rovte	Gereuth	Loitsch	
Ruše	Maria-Rast	Marbug	
Savci	Safren		
Seč, Novo Mesto	Gehack, Gehag		
Segovci	Sögersdorf		
Sejanci	Seanzen		
Selca nad Škofjo Loko (Selce)	Selzach bei Bischoflack	Krainburg	
Selnica ob Dravi	Zellnitz	Marbug	
Semič	Semitsch	Tschernembl	
Sevnica	Lichtenwald	Rann	
Slatina, Radenci	Bad Radein		
Slivnica pri Celju	Schleinitz bei Cilli		
Slivnica pri Mariboru	Schleinitz (bei Marburg)	Cilli	
Slovenj Gradec	Windischgrätz	Windischgrätz	
Slovenska Bistrica	Windisch-Feistritz	Marbug	
Slovenske Konjice	Gonowitz (Gonobitz)	Cilli	
Smlednik	Flödnig	Krainburg	
Sodražica	Soderschitz (Sodersic)	Gottschee	
Solčava	Sulzbach	Cilli	
Sorica	Zarz		
Središče ob Dravi	Polstrau	Pettau	
Srednja vas v Bohinju	Mitterdorf in der Wochein	Radmannsdorf	
Srednja Vas v Črmošnjicah	Mitterdorf bei Tschermoschnitz		
Sromlje	Sromle		
Stara Cerkev pri Kočevju	Mitterdorf bei Gottschee	Gottschee	
Stare Žage	Altsag		
Stari Log pri Kočevju	Altlag	Gottschee	
Stari Trg pri Črnomlju	Altenmarkt bei Gottschee (bei Pölland before 1896)	Tschernembl	
Stari Trg pri Rakeku	Altenmarkt bei Rakek	Loitsch	
Stična (Zaticina)	Sittich	Littai	
Stražišče	Straschische (?)		
Strnišče	Kriegsspital, Sternthal bei Pettau		
Studenci pri Mariboru	Brunndorf bei Marburg		
Studenec pri Ljubljani	Brunndorf bei Laibach (Brundorf before 1867)	Laibach	
Studenice pri Poljčanah	Studenitz bei Pöltschach	Marbug	
Suhor	Suchor		
Sveta Ana v Slovenskih Goricah	St. Anna am Kriechenberge	Radkersburg	
Sveta Barbara pri Mariboru	St. Barbara bei Marburg (bei Wurmberg before 1897)	Marbug	
Sveta Barbara v Halozah	St. Barbara in der Kollos	Pettau	
Sveta Marjeta pri Moškanjcih	St. Margareten bei Moschganzen	(Pettau based on Moschganzen)	
Sveta Trojica v Slovenskih goricah	Heiligen Dreifaltigkeit in Windisch-Büheln	Marbug	
Sveti Andraž v Halozah	St. Andrä in Leskowetz	Pettau	
Sveti Andraž v Slovenskih goricah	St. Andrä in Windisch-Büheln	Pettau	
Sveti Anton v Slovenskih goricah	St. Anton in Windisch Büheln		
Sveti Benedikt v Slovenskih Goricah	St. Benedikten in Windisch-Büheln	Marbug	
Sveti Bolfenk pri Središču	St. Wolfgang bei Polstrau	Pettau	
Sveti Bolfank v Slovenskih goricah	St. Wolfgang in Windisch-Büheln (am Wischberge)	Pettau	
Sveti Jakob v Slovenskih goricah	St. Jakob in Windisch-Büheln	Marbug	
Sveti Jurij na Ščavnici	St. Georgen an der Stainz	Luttenberg	
Sveti Jurij ob južni železnici	St. Georgen an der Südbahn	Cilli	
Sveti Jurij ob Taboru	St. Georgen am Tabor	Cilli	
Sveti Jurij v Slovenskih goricah	St. Georgen in Windischbüheln	Marbug	
Sveti Križ pri Kostanjevici	Heiligenkreuz bei Landstraß	Gurkfeld	
Sveti Križ pri Litiji	Heiligenkreuz bei Littai (bei Thurn)	Littai	
Sveti Lenart v Slovenskih goricah	St. Leonhard in Windisch-Büheln (before 1896), in Steiermark	Marbug	
Sveti Lovrenc na Dravskem polju	St. Lorenzen am Draufelde		
Sveti Lovrenc pri Mariboru	St. Lorenzen ob Marburg (in der Wüste before 1896)	Marbug	
Sveti Nikolaj pri Ormožu	St. Nikolai bei Friedau	Pettau	
Sveti Pavel pri Preboldu	St. Paul bei Pragwald (im Sannthale before 1894)	Cilli	
Sveti Peter pod Svetimi gorami	St. Peter bei Königsberg		
Sveti Peter v Savinjski dolini	St. Peter im Sannthale (bei Cilli)	Cilli	
Sveti Primož v Podjuni	St. Primus im Jauntal		
Sveti Tomaž pri Ormožu	St. Thomas bei Friedau		
Sveti Urban pri Ptuju	St. Urban bei Pettau	Pettau	
Sveti Vid pri Ptuju	St. Veit bei Pettau	Pettau	
Šenčur pri Kranju	St. Georgen bei Krainburg	Krainburg	
Šentilj	St. Egidi (Egid ?)in Windischbüheln		
Šentjanž	Johannistal (Johannesthal in Krain before 1899)	Gurkfeld	
Šentjernej	St. Barthelmä	Gurkfeld	
Šent Peter pri Novem Mestu	St. Peter bei Rudolfswert	Rudolfswerth	
Šentrupert pri Mokronogu	St. Ruprecht in Krain (bei Nassenfuss)	Gurkfeld	
Šentvid nad Ljubljano	St. Veit ob Laibach	Laibach	
Šent Vid pri Stični (pri Zaticini)	St. Veit bei Sittich	Littai	
Šentjur	Sankt Georg bei Cilli		
Škocijan	St. Kanzian bei Nassenfuß (Sanct-Canzian)	Gurkfeld	
Škofja Loka	Bischoflack	Krainburg	
Šmarje pri Jelšah	St. Marein bei Erlachstein	Cilli	
Šmarje-Sap	St. Marein-Sap	Laibach	
Šmarjeta ob Pesnici	St. Margarethen an der Pössnitz	Marbug	
Šmarjeta pri Novem Mestu	St. Margarethen in Krain	Gurkfeld	
Šmartno ob Dreti	St. Martin bei Oberburg	Cilli	
Šmartno pri Litiji	St. Martin bei Littai	Littai	
Šmartno v Tuhinju	St. Martin in Tuchein		
Šoštanj	Schönstein	Windischgrätz	
Štale	Stalldorf		
Štajerska	Untersteiermark		
Štore	Store	Cilli	
Tolmin	Tolmein	Tolmein	
Toplice pri Novem mestu	Töplitz bei Rudolfswerth (in Krain)	Rudolfswerth	
Topli Vrh	(Unter-)Tappelwerch		
Trbovlje	Trifail	Cilli	
Trebelno	Trebelno	Gurkfeld	
Trebnje	Treffen (in Krain)	Rudolfswerth	
Trnovo ob Muri	Weitersfeld in Steiermark	Radkersburg	
Trnovci	Ternofzen		
Trojane	Trojana	Stein in Krain	
Trzin	Tersein	Stein in Krain	
Tržič (Teržič)	Neumarktl	Krainburg	
Tržišče, Sevnica	Tersische	Gurkfeld	
Turjak	Auersperg	Gottschee	
Unec	Maunitz		
Vače	Waatsch		
Velenje	Wallein, Wöllan	Windischgrätz	
Velika Loka	Grosslack bei Treffen	Rudolfswerth	
Velika Nedelja	Gross-Sonntag	Pettau	
Velika Vas, Moravče	Großdorf		
Velike Lašče	Gross Laschitsch (Grosslaschitz before 1867)	Gottschee	
Vič	Waitsch	Laibach	
Videm, Dobrepolje	Videm bei Gutenfeld (bei Grosslaschitsch before 1894)	Gottschee	
Videm pri Krškem	Videm (in Steiermark)	Rann	
Vinica pri Črnomlju	Weinitz	Tschernembl	
Vipava	Wippach	Adelsberg	
Višnja Gora	Weixelburg, Weichslburg	Littai	
Vitanje	Weitenstein	Cilli	
Vodice nad Ljubljano (na Kranjskem)	Woditz in Krain	Stein in Krain	
Vojnik, Vojnik	Hochenegg	Cilli	
Vransko (Vranjsko)	Franz	Cilli	
Vratja Vas	Frattendorf		
Vrčice	Wertschitz		
Vrhnika	Ober Laibach	Laibach	
Vuhred	Wuchern	Windischgrätz	
Vurberg pri Ptuju	Wurmberg bei Pettau		
Vuzenica	Saldenhofen	Windischgrätz	
Zagorje ob Savi	Sagor, Seger an der Sawe	Littai	
Zavrče	Sauritsch	Pettau	
Zgornja Polskava	Ober-Pulsgau	Marbug	
Zgornja Sveta Kungota	Ober-St.Kunigund		
Zidani Most	Steinbrück (Steinbrücken before 1867)	Cilli	
Zreče	Rötschach bei Gonobitz		
Žalec	Sachsenfeld	Cilli	
Železniki	Eisnern (Eisern)	Krainburg	
Žepovci	Schöpfendorf		
Žetale	Schiltern in Steiermark	Pettau	
Žiberci	Seibersdorf		
Žiče	Seiz		
Žiri	Sairach	Loitsch	
Žirovnica	Scherounitz	Radmannsdorf	
Žužemberk (Žužemberg)	Seisenberg	Rudolfswerth	

== See also ==
- German exonyms
- List of European exonyms
