= Mala Vas =

Mala Vas (Slovene: Mala vas) may refer to several places in Slovenia:

- Mala Vas, Dobrepolje, a settlement in the Municipality of Dobrepolje
- Mala Vas, Gorišnica, a settlement in the Municipality of Gorišnica
- Mala Vas (Ljubljana), a former settlement in the City Municipality of Ljubljana
- Mala Vas pri Grosupljem, a settlement in the Municipality of Grosupljem
- Mala Vas pri Ormožu, a settlement in the Municipality of Sveti Tomaž
