= Rakovci =

Rakovci may refer to:

- Rakovci, Slovenia, a village near Sveti Tomaž, Sveti Tomaž
- Rakovci, Croatia, a village near Poreč
- Rakovci, Latvia, a village near Zaļesje Parish
