= Velike Poljane, Ribnica =

Velike Poljane
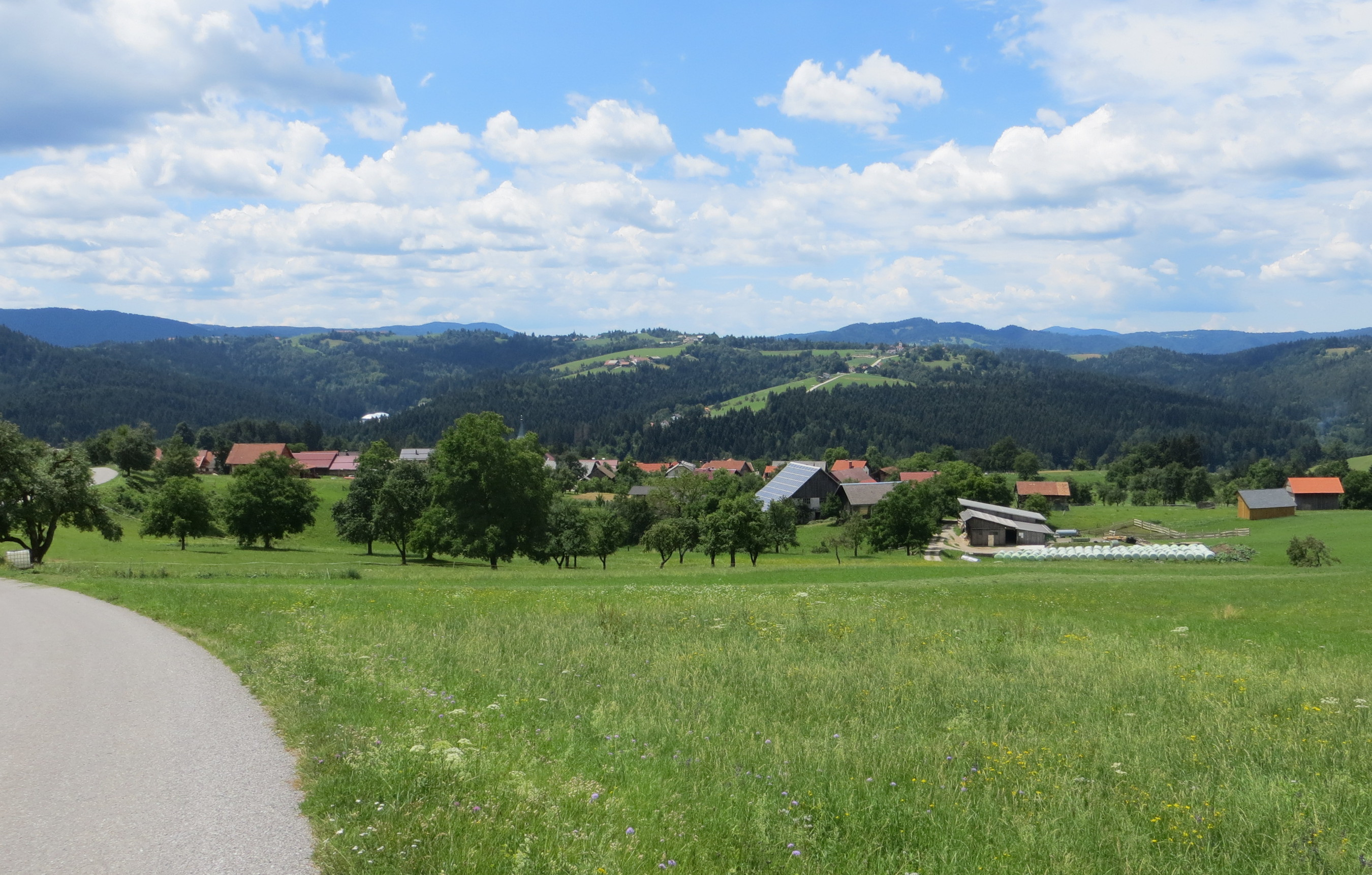

- Location in Slovenia
- Coordinates: 45°47′52.53″N 14°41′8.13″E
- Country: Slovenia
- Traditional region: Lower Carniola
- Statistical region: Southeast Slovenia
- Municipality: Ribnica

Area
  - Total: 2.57 km^{2} (0.99 sq mi)
- Elevation: 630.6 m (2,069 ft)

Population (2002)
  - Total: 127
- Postal code: 1316

Velike Poljane (pronounced [ˈʋeːlikɛ pɔˈljaːnɛ]; German: Großpölland) is a village in the Municipality of Ribnica in southern Slovenia. It lies in the hills east of the main road and railway line from Ljubljana to Ribnica at Ortnek. The area is part of the traditional region of Lower Carniola and is now included in the Southeast Slovenia Statistical Region.

== Church ==
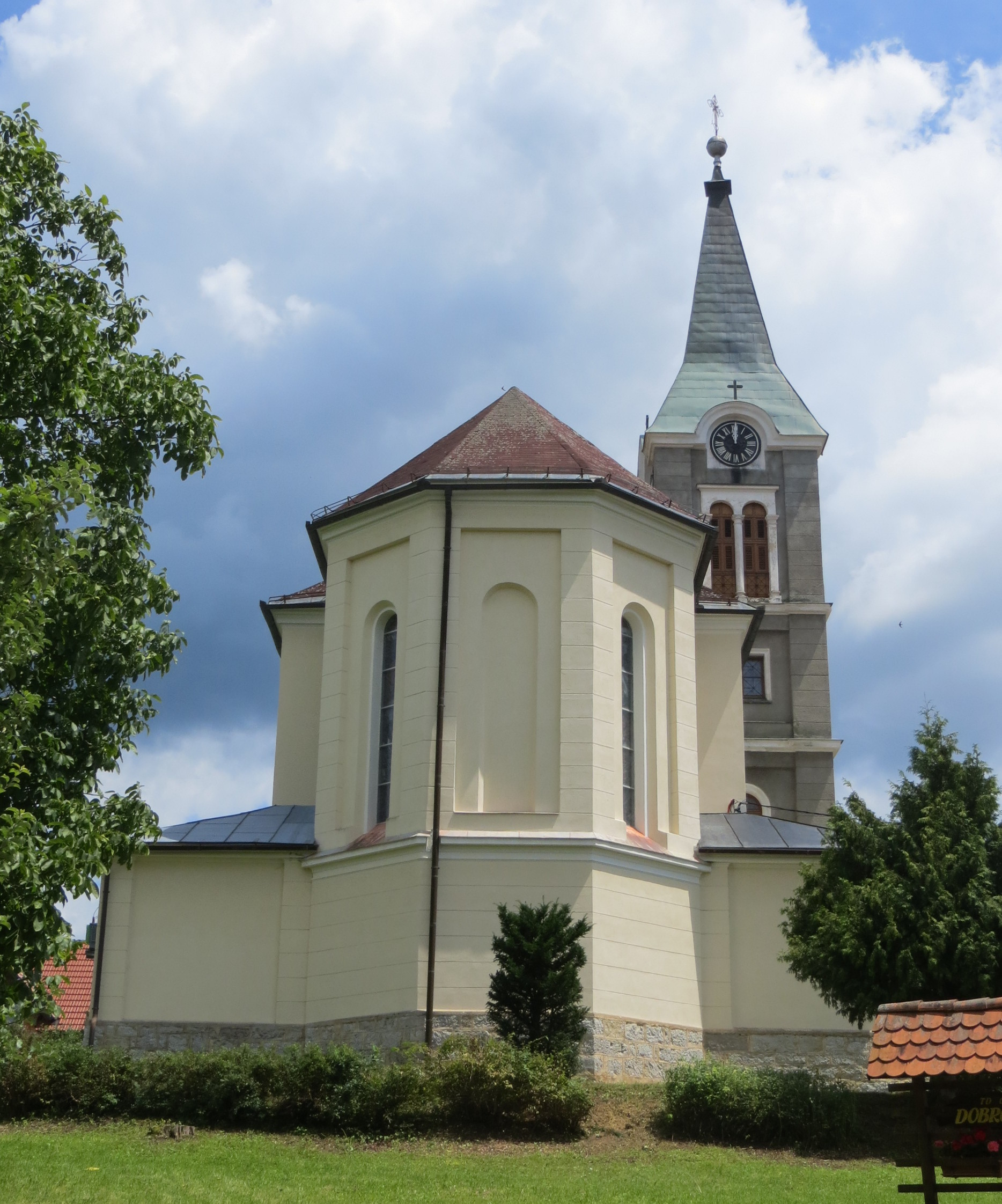
Saint Joseph's Church

The local parish church is dedicated to Saint Joseph and belongs to the Roman Catholic Archdiocese of Ljubljana. It was built in 1900. A second church, built next to the cemetery 1 km south of the settlement, is dedicated to Saint Thomas and dates to the 16th century with 17th-century alterations.
