= Grabe =

Grabe or Gräbe may refer to:

== People ==
- Carl Gräbe (1841–1927), German chemist
- Hermann Friedrich Graebe (or Gräbe; 1900–1986), German engineer
- John Ernest Grabe (1666–1711), English theologian
- Matt Grabe (born 1985), American record producer
- Ronald J. Grabe (born 1945), American astronaut
- Vera Grabe, Colombian anthropologist

== Places ==
- Grabe, Apače, a village in Slovenia
- Grabe, Mühlhausen, a village near Mühlhausen in Thuringia, Germany
- Grabe, Središče ob Dravi, a village in Slovenia
- Grabe, Croatia, a village near Bedekovčina, Croatia
