= Vidrga =

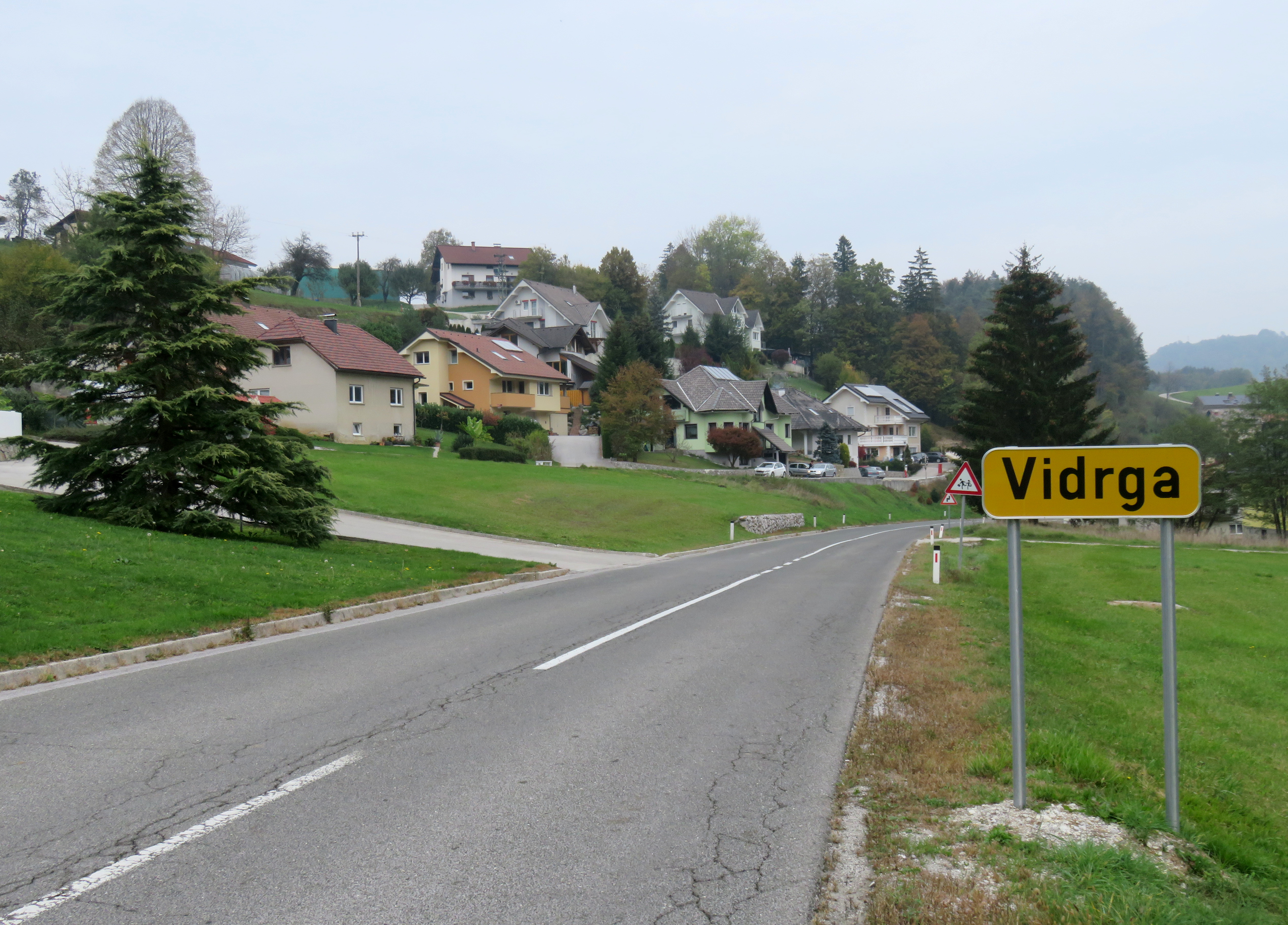

- Location in Slovenia
- Coordinates: 46°8′6.2″N 14°51′34.47″E
- Country: Slovenia
- Traditional region: Upper Carniola
- Statistical region: Central Sava
- Municipality: Zagorje ob Savi

Area
  - Total: 0.99 km^{2} (0.38 sq mi)
- Elevation: 430.4 m (1,412 ft)

Population (2002)
  - Total: 97
- Postal code: 1252

Vidrga (pronounced [ˈʋiːdəɾɡa]; in older sources also Viderga) is a small settlement in the Municipality of Zagorje ob Savi in central Slovenia. It lies north of Vače on the main road from Moravče to Izlake. The area is part of the traditional region of Upper Carniola. It is now included with the rest of the municipality in the Central Sava Statistical Region.

== Name ==
The name Vidrga is believed to be derived from a pre-Slavic hydronym etymologically related to Idrija with a prothetic -v.

== History ==
Vidrga was a hamlet of Kandrše until 1998, when it was separated from it and made a separate village.
