= Zgornje Konjišče =

- Location in Slovenia
- Coordinates: 46°42′36.35″N 15°48′58.63″E
- Country: Slovenia
- Traditional region: Styria
- Statistical region: Mura
- Municipality: Apače

Area
  - Total: 2.88 km^{2} (1.11 sq mi)
- Elevation: 229.5 m (753 ft)

Population (2020)
  - Total: 88
  - Density: 31/km^{2} (79/sq mi)

Zgornje Konjišče (pronounced [ˈzɡoːɾnjɛ kɔˈnjiːʃtʃɛ]) is a settlement north of Podgorje on the right bank of the Mura River in the Municipality of Apače in northeastern Slovenia.

== History ==
Zgornje Konjišče became a separate settlement in 1952, when the former village of Konjišče was divided into this village and neighboring Spodnje Konjišče.
