= Vratji Vrh =

- Location in Slovenia
- Coordinates: 46°42′12.65″N 15°47′35.41″E
- Country: Slovenia
- Traditional region: Styria
- Statistical region: Mura
- Municipality: Apače

Area
  - Total: 0.79 km^{2} (0.31 sq mi)
- Elevation: 337.6 m (1,108 ft)

Population (2020)
  - Total: 74
  - Density: 94/km^{2} (240/sq mi)

Vratji Vrh (pronounced [ˈwɾaːtji ˈʋəɾx]) is a small settlement above Vratja Vas in the Municipality of Apače in northeastern Slovenia.
