= Plitvica, Apače =

Plitvica
- Location in Slovenia
- Coordinates: 46°40′36.01″N 15°55′44.32″E
- Country: Slovenia
- Traditional region: Styria
- Statistical region: Mura
- Municipality: Apače

Area
  - Total: 2.77 km^{2} (1.07 sq mi)
- Elevation: 217.2 m (713 ft)

Population (2020)
  - Total: 107
  - Density: 38.6/km^{2} (100/sq mi)

Plitvica (pronounced [pliˈtʋiːtsa], German: Plippitz) is a settlement in the Municipality of Apače in northeastern Slovenia. There is a small chapel with a belfry in the eastern part of the village on the road towards Lutverci. It was built in 1930 and is dedicated to the memory of missing soldiers of the First World War from the Plitvica area.
