= Stogovci =

Stogovci may refer to several places in Slovenia:

- Stogovci, Apače, a settlement in the Municipality of Apače
- Stogovci, Majšperk, a settlement in the Municipality of Majšperk
