= Lesane =

Lesane or Lešane may refer to:

- Lešane, Apače, in Slovenia
- Lešane, Suva Reka, in Kosovo
- Parish Lesane Crooks, birth name of Tupac Shakur (1971–1996), American rapper and actor
