= Mezgovci, Sveti Tomaž =

Mezgovci
- Location in Slovenia
- Coordinates: 46°30′12.01″N 16°1′46.55″E
- Country: Slovenia
- Traditional region: Styria
- Statistical region: Drava
- Municipality: Sveti Tomaž

Area
  - Total: 0.72 km^{2} (0.28 sq mi)
- Elevation: 259.6 m (852 ft)

Population (2002)
  - Total: 46

Mezgovci (pronounced [ˈmeːzɡɔu̯tsi], German: Mesgofzen) is a small settlement in the Slovene Hills (Slovene: Slovenske gorice) in the Municipality of Sveti Tomaž in northeastern Slovenia. The area is part of the traditional region of Styria and is now included in the Drava Statistical Region.

The village roadside chapel with a belfry was built in 1905.
