= Rucmanci =

- Location in Slovenia
- Coordinates: 46°29′25.35″N 16°1′12.38″E
- Country: Slovenia
- Traditional region: Styria
- Statistical region: Drava
- Municipality: Sveti Tomaž

Area
  - Total: 4.74 km^{2} (1.83 sq mi)
- Elevation: 301.4 m (989 ft)

Population (2002)
  - Total: 231

Rucmanci (pronounced [ˈɾuːtsmantsi], German: Rutzmanetz) is a settlement in the Slovene Hills (Slovene: Slovenske gorice) in the Municipality of Sveti Tomaž in northeastern Slovenia. The area is part of the traditional region of Styria and is now included in the Drava Statistical Region.

The village chapel-shrine with a belfry was built in 1905.
