= Bratonečice =

- Location in Slovenia
- Coordinates: 46°27′20.6″N 16°3′5.33″E
- Country: Slovenia
- Traditional region: Styria
- Statistical region: Drava
- Municipality: Sveti Tomaž

Area
  - Total: 1.96 km^{2} (0.76 sq mi)
- Elevation: 214.7 m (704 ft)

Population (2002)
  - Total: 71

Bratonečice (pronounced [bɾatɔˈneːtʃitsɛ]) is a settlement in the Slovene Hills (Slovene: Slovenske gorice) northwest of Ormož in northeastern Slovenia. It belongs to the Municipality of Sveti Tomaž, which became an independent municipality in 2006. The area is part of the traditional region of Styria and is now included in the Drava Statistical Region.

There is a small chapel in the village. It was built in 1863.
