= Mahovci =

- Location in Slovenia
- Coordinates: 46°41′21.44″N 15°52′49.07″E
- Country: Slovenia
- Traditional region: Styria
- Statistical region: Mura
- Municipality: Apače

Area
  - Total: 1.22 km^{2} (0.47 sq mi)
- Elevation: 222.9 m (731 ft)

Population (2020)
  - Total: 115
  - Density: 94.3/km^{2} (244/sq mi)

Mahovci (pronounced [ˈmaːxɔu̯tsi]) is a village in the Municipality of Apače in northeastern Slovenia.
