= Zagorje, Sveti Tomaž =

Zagorje
- Location in Slovenia
- Coordinates: 46°28′31.02″N 16°3′59.67″E
- Country: Slovenia
- Traditional region: Styria
- Statistical region: Drava
- Municipality: Sveti Tomaž

Area
  - Total: 1.28 km^{2} (0.49 sq mi)
- Elevation: 279.1 m (916 ft)

Population (2002)
  - Total: 71

Zagorje (pronounced [ˈzaːɡɔɾjɛ]) is a settlement in the Municipality of Sveti Tomaž in northeastern Slovenia. The area belonged to the traditional region of Styria. It is now included in the Drava Statistical Region.
