= Senčak, Sveti Tomaž =

Senčak
- Location in Slovenia
- Coordinates: 46°30′24.16″N 16°0′51.43″E
- Country: Slovenia
- Traditional region: Styria
- Statistical region: Drava
- Municipality: Sveti Tomaž

Area
  - Total: 0.61 km^{2} (0.24 sq mi)
- Elevation: 282.7 m (927 ft)

Population (2002)
  - Total: 40
- the data in the settlement infobox refers only to the part of the settlement in the Sveti Tomaž Municipality

Senčak (pronounced [ˈseːntʃak]) is a small settlement in the Slovene Hills (Slovene: Slovenske gorice) in the Municipality of Sveti Tomaž in northeastern Slovenia. Part of the settlement is in the adjacent Municipality of Juršinci. The area belonged to the traditional region of Styria. It is now included in the Drava Statistical Region.
