= Janhova =

- Location in Slovenia
- Coordinates: 46°40′38.74″N 15°51′17.55″E
- Country: Slovenia
- Traditional region: Styria
- Statistical region: Mura
- Municipality: Apače

Area
  - Total: 2.81 km^{2} (1.08 sq mi)
- Elevation: 248.6 m (816 ft)

Population (2020)
  - Total: 48
  - Density: 17/km^{2} (44/sq mi)

Janhova (pronounced [ˈjaːŋxɔʋa]) is a small dispersed settlement in the Municipality of Apače in northeastern Slovenia.
