= Novi Vrh =

- Location in Slovenia
- Coordinates: 46°41′57.48″N 15°48′13.79″E
- Country: Slovenia
- Traditional region: Styria
- Statistical region: Mura
- Municipality: Apače

Area
  - Total: 0.38 km^{2} (0.15 sq mi)
- Elevation: 358.6 m (1,177 ft)

Population (2020)
  - Total: 23
  - Density: 61/km^{2} (160/sq mi)

Novi Vrh (pronounced [ˈnɔːʋi ˈʋəɾx]) is a small settlement in the Municipality of Apače in northeastern Slovenia.
