= Pogled, Apače =

Pogled
- Location in Slovenia
- Coordinates: 46°41′55.12″N 15°49′11.66″E
- Country: Slovenia
- Traditional region: Styria
- Statistical region: Mura
- Municipality: Apače

Area
  - Total: 0.77 km^{2} (0.30 sq mi)
- Elevation: 356.5 m (1,170 ft)

Population (2020)
  - Total: 56
  - Density: 73/km^{2} (190/sq mi)

Pogled (pronounced [ˈpoːɡlɛt]) is a small settlement in the Municipality of Apače in northeastern Slovenia.
