= Municipality of Apače =

Municipality of Slovenia

Municipality of Apače Občina Apače
- Municipality
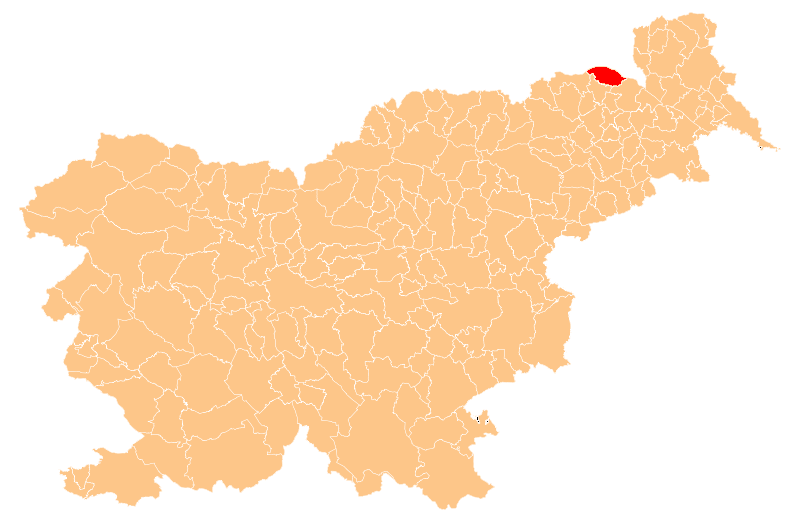
- Location of the Municipality of Apače in Slovenia
- Coordinates: 46°41′57″N 15°54′31″E
- Country: Slovenia

Government
  - Mayor: Andrej Steyer (SDS)

Area
  - Total: 53.5 km^{2} (20.7 sq mi)

Population (2010)
  - Total: 3,611
  - Density: 67.5/km^{2} (175/sq mi)
- Time zone: UTC+01 (CET)
  - Summer (DST): UTC+02 (CEST)
- Postal code: 9253
- Vehicle registration: MS
- Website: www.obcina-apace.si

The Municipality of Apače (pronounced [ˈáːpatʃɛ]; Slovene: Občina Apače) is a municipality in Slovenia. It lies in the traditional region of Styria in northeastern Slovenia and belongs to the Mura Statistical Region. The municipality borders the municipalities of Šentilj, Sveta Ana, and Gornja Radgona. The Mura River is the border between Slovenia and Austria. The seat of the municipality is the town of Apače. The municipality was established in 2006 and split from the Municipality of Gornja Radgona on 1 January 2007. It borders Austria.

== Settlements ==
In addition to the municipal seat of Apače, the municipality also includes the following settlements:

- Črnci
- Drobtinci
- Grabe
- Janhova
- Lešane
- Lutverci
- Mahovci
- Nasova
- Novi Vrh
- Plitvica
- Podgorje
- Pogled
- Segovci
- Spodnje Konjišče
- Stogovci
- Vratja Vas
- Vratji Vrh
- Žepovci
- Zgornje Konjišče
- Žiberci
