= Koračice =

- Location in Slovenia
- Coordinates: 46°29′35.68″N 16°4′47.36″E
- Country: Slovenia
- Traditional region: Styria
- Statistical region: Drava
- Municipality: Sveti Tomaž

Area
  - Total: 4.71 km^{2} (1.82 sq mi)
- Elevation: 250.7 m (823 ft)

Population (2002)
  - Total: 200

Koračice (pronounced [ˈkoːɾatʃitsɛ]) is a settlement in the Slovene Hills (Slovene: Slovenske gorice) northwest of Ormož in northeastern Slovenia. It belongs to the Municipality of Sveti Tomaž, which became an independent municipality in 2006. The area is part of the traditional region of Styria and is now included in the Drava Statistical Region.

The small village chapel-shrine with a belfry was built in 1919 and 1920.
