= Spodnje Konjišče =

- Location in Slovenia
- Coordinates: 46°42′53.96″N 15°51′39″E
- Country: Slovenia
- Traditional region: Styria
- Statistical region: Mura
- Municipality: Apače

Area
  - Total: 3.22 km^{2} (1.24 sq mi)
- Elevation: 222.6 m (730 ft)

Population (2020)
  - Total: 39
  - Density: 12/km^{2} (31/sq mi)

Spodnje Konjišče (pronounced [ˈspoːdnjɛ kɔˈnjiːʃtʃɛ]) is a dispersed settlement on the right bank of the Mura River in the Municipality of Apače in northeastern Slovenia, right on the border with Austria.

== History ==
Spodnje Konjišče became a separate settlement in 1952, when the former village of Konjišče was divided into this village and neighboring Zgornje Konjišče. At the same time, the village of Konjišče–Log was annexed by Spodnje Konjišče.
