= Pršetinci =

- Location in Slovenia
- Coordinates: 46°29′19.14″N 16°6′31.14″E
- Country: Slovenia
- Traditional region: Styria
- Statistical region: Drava
- Municipality: Sveti Tomaž

Area
  - Total: 2.21 km^{2} (0.85 sq mi)
- Elevation: 244.8 m (803 ft)

Population (2002)
  - Total: 179

Pršetinci (pronounced [pəɾˈʃeːtintsi]) is a settlement in the Slovene Hills (Slovene: Slovenske gorice) in the Municipality of Sveti Tomaž in northeastern Slovenia. The area is part of the traditional region of Styria and is now included in the Drava Statistical Region.

There is a chapel at the crossroads at the centre of the village, dating to 1885. A chapel-shrine stands in the northern part of the village and was built in 1922.
