= Nasova =

- Location in Slovenia
- Coordinates: 46°40′2.02″N 15°52′15.78″E
- Country: Slovenia
- Traditional region: Styria
- Statistical region: Mura
- Municipality: Apače

Area
  - Total: 3.13 km^{2} (1.21 sq mi)
- Elevation: 299.1 m (981 ft)

Population (2020)
  - Total: 161
  - Density: 51.4/km^{2} (133/sq mi)

Nasova (pronounced [ˈnaːsɔʋa]) is a village in the Municipality of Apače in northeastern Slovenia.

The village chapel to the east of the village on the road towards Lešane was built in 1928 to house the original free-standing sculptures of the crucifixion, erected in 1683. It was renovated and repainted in 2000.
