= Senik, Sveti Tomaž =

Senik
- Location in Slovenia
- Coordinates: 46°27′18.78″N 16°5′9.96″E
- Country: Slovenia
- Traditional region: Styria
- Statistical region: Drava
- Municipality: Sveti Tomaž

Area
  - Total: 1.49 km^{2} (0.58 sq mi)
- Elevation: 280.3 m (920 ft)

Population (2002)
  - Total: 85

Senik (pronounced [sɛˈniːk]) is a settlement in the Slovene Hills (Slovene: Slovenske gorice) in the Municipality of Sveti Tomaž in northeastern Slovenia. The area belonged to the traditional region of Styria. It is now included in the Drava Statistical Region.

There is a small chapel-shrine with a belfry in the village. It dates to the early 20th century.
