= Gradišče pri Ormožu =

- Location in Slovenia
- Coordinates: 46°28′24.52″N 16°4′37.04″E
- Country: Slovenia
- Traditional region: Styria
- Statistical region: Drava
- Municipality: Sveti Tomaž

Area
  - Total: 0.2 km^{2} (0.077 sq mi)
- Elevation: 283.5 m (930 ft)

Population (2002)
  - Total: 41

Gradišče pri Ormožu (pronounced [ɡraˈdiːʃtʃɛ pri ˈoːrmɔʒu]) is a small settlement in the Slovene Hills (Slovene: Slovenske gorice) northwest of Ormož in northeastern Slovenia. It belongs to the Municipality of Sveti Tomaž, which became an independent municipality in 2006. The area is part of the traditional region of Styria and is now included in the Drava Statistical Region.

== Name ==
The name of the settlement was changed from Gradišče to Gradišče pri Ormožu in 1953.
