= Hranjigovci =

- Location in Slovenia
- Coordinates: 46°28′24.83″N 16°5′46.9″E
- Country: Slovenia
- Traditional region: Styria
- Statistical region: Drava
- Municipality: Sveti Tomaž

Area
  - Total: 2.35 km^{2} (0.91 sq mi)
- Elevation: 228 m (748 ft)

Population (2002)
  - Total: 88

Hranjigovci (pronounced [xɾaˈnjiːɡɔu̯tsi]) is a settlement in the Slovene Hills (Slovene: Slovenske gorice) northwest of Ormož in northeastern Slovenia. It belongs to the Municipality of Sveti Tomaž, which became an independent municipality in 2006. The area is part of the traditional region of Styria and is now included in the Drava Statistical Region.

There is a small roadside chapel-shrine with a belfry in the northeastern part of the village. It was built in the early 20th century.
