= Gornji Ključarovci =

- Location in Slovenia
- Coordinates: 46°28′4.35″N 16°5′54.46″E
- Country: Slovenia
- Traditional region: Styria
- Statistical region: Drava
- Municipality: Sveti Tomaž

Area
  - Total: 2.98 km^{2} (1.15 sq mi)
- Elevation: 224.9 m (738 ft)

Population (2002)
  - Total: 113

Gornji Ključarovci (pronounced [ˈɡoːɾnji kljuˈtʃaːɾɔu̯tsi]) is a settlement in the Slovene Hills (Slovene: Slovenske gorice) northwest of Ormož in northeastern Slovenia. It belongs to the Municipality of Sveti Tomaž, which became an independent municipality in 2006. The area is part of the traditional region of Styria and is now included in the Drava Statistical Region.

== Notable people ==
Notable people that were born or lived in Gornji Ključarovci include:

- Franc Ksaver Meško (1874–1964), writer
