= Municipality of Sveti Tomaž =

Municipality of Slovenia

Municipality of Sveti Tomaž Občina Sveti Tomaž
- Municipality
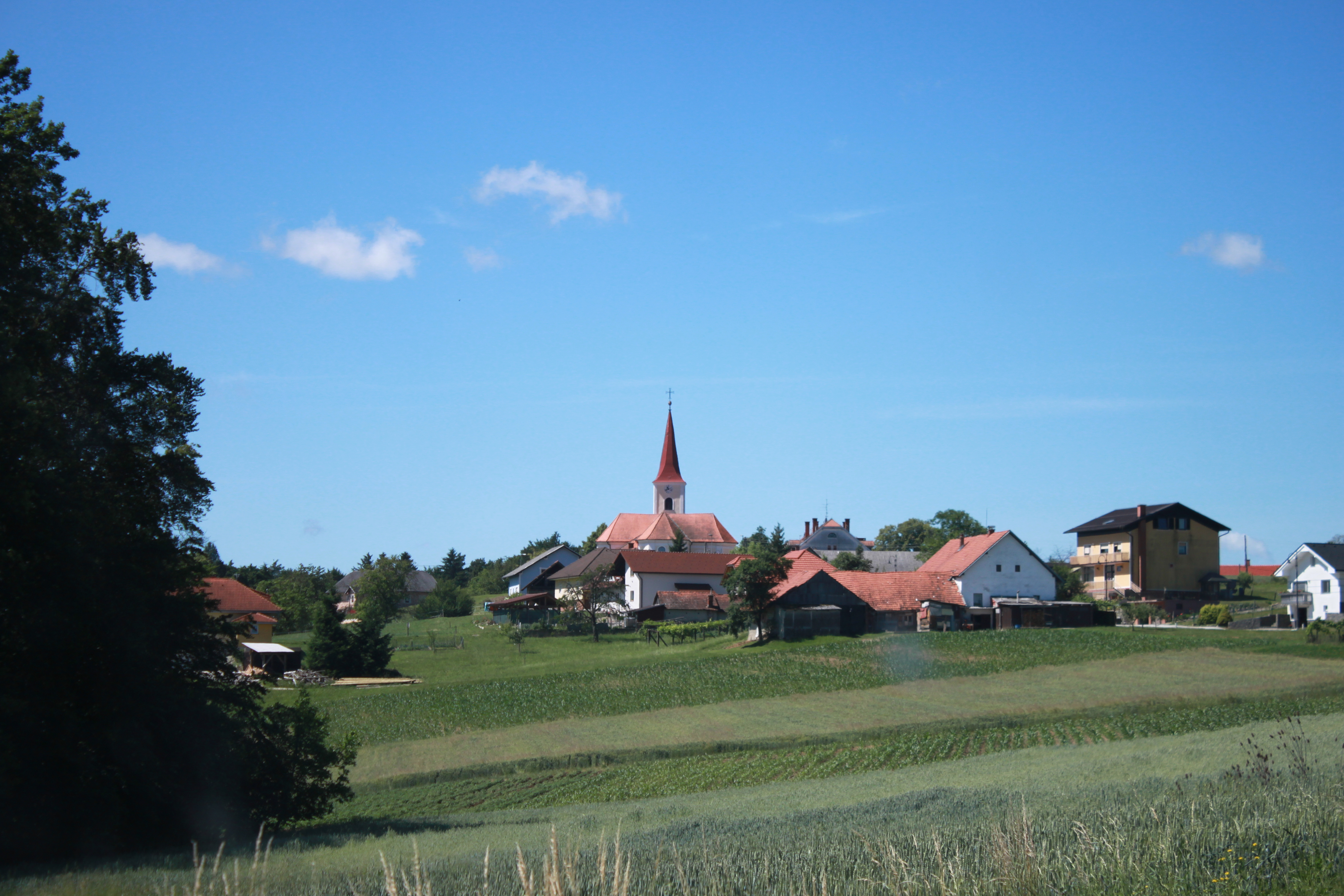

- Location of the Municipality of Sveti Tomaž in Slovenia
- Coordinates: 46°29′0″N 16°4′46″E
- Country: Slovenia

Government
  - Mayor: Mirko Cvetko

Area
  - Total: 38.09 km^{2} (14.71 sq mi)

Population (2002)
  - Total: 2,209
  - Density: 57.99/km^{2} (150.2/sq mi)
- Time zone: UTC+01 (CET)
  - Summer (DST): UTC+02 (CEST)
- Website: www.sv-tomaz.si

The Municipality of Sveti Tomaž (pronounced [ˈsʋeːti tɔˈmaːʃ]) is a municipality in northeastern Slovenia. It lies in the Prlekija Hills and was part of the Municipality of Ormož until 2006. The area belongs to the traditional region of Styria and is now part of the Drava Statistical Region. The seat of the municipality is Sveti Tomaž.

== Settlements ==
In addition to the municipal seat of Sveti Tomaž, the municipality also includes the following settlements:

- Bratonečice
- Gornji Ključarovci
- Gradišče pri Ormožu
- Hranjigovci
- Koračice
- Mala Vas pri Ormožu
- Mezgovci
- Pršetinci
- Rakovci
- Rucmanci
- Savci
- Sejanci
- Senčak
- Senik
- Trnovci
- Zagorje
