= Črnci =

- Location in Slovenia
- Coordinates: 46°42′1.95″N 15°53′27.86″E
- Country: Slovenia
- Traditional region: Styria
- Statistical region: Mura
- Municipality: Apače

Area
  - Total: 5.36 km^{2} (2.07 sq mi)
- Elevation: 219.1 m (719 ft)

Population (2020)
  - Total: 270
  - Density: 50/km^{2} (130/sq mi)

Črnci (pronounced [ˈtʃəɾntsi], in older sources also Črnce, German: Schirmdorf) is a village in the Municipality of Apače in northeastern Slovenia.

The Freudenau Mansion is an originally 17th-century Baroque mansion in the settlement that was renovated in a Neoclassical style in the 19th century.
