= Grabe, Apače =

Grabe
- Location in Slovenia
- Coordinates: 46°40′48.29″N 15°50′12.76″E
- Country: Slovenia
- Traditional region: Styria
- Statistical region: Mura
- Municipality: Apače

Area
  - Total: 2.17 km^{2} (0.84 sq mi)
- Elevation: 291.7 m (957 ft)

Population (2020)
  - Total: 113
  - Density: 52.1/km^{2} (135/sq mi)

Grabe (pronounced [ˈɡɾaːbɛ]) is a settlement in the Municipality of Apače in northeastern Slovenia.
