= Apače =

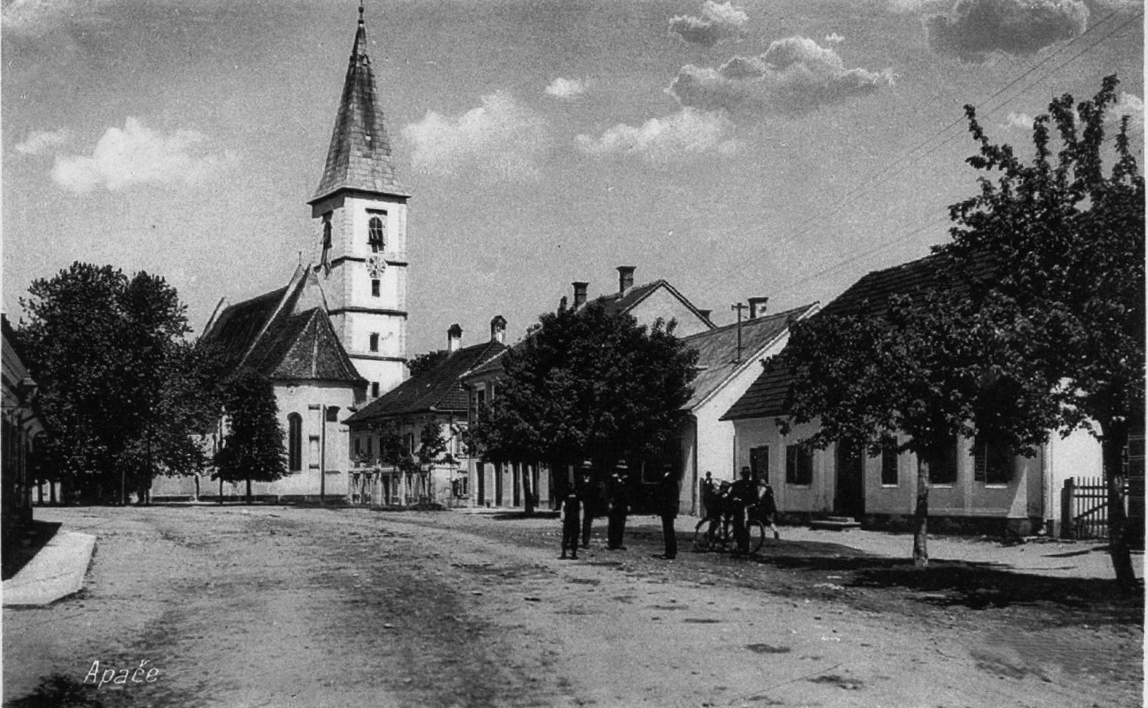
- Postcard of Apače before the Second World War

- Location in Slovenia
- Coordinates: 46°41′48.1″N 15°54′40.12″E
- Country: Slovenia
- Traditional region: Styria
- Statistical region: Mura
- Municipality: Apače

Area
  - Total: 4.4 km^{2} (1.7 sq mi)
- Elevation: 218 m (715 ft)

Population (2020)
  - Total: 543
  - Density: 120/km^{2} (320/sq mi)

Apače (pronounced [ˈáːpatʃɛ]; German: Abstall) is a town in Slovenia and it is located on the border between Slovenia and Austria. It is the seat of the Municipality of Apače, which is the northernmost municipality in the traditional region of Slovenian Styria. It now belongs to the Mura Statistical Region. It is located 25 kilometers northeast of Maribor and 20 kilometers west of Murska Sobota.

== Name ==
Apače was attested as Appetstal c. 1200, Apstal in 1307, and Abstal in 1383. The name Apače is derived from *Apaťe (selo) 'abbot's village', referring to territory that was owned by an abbot or an abbey. Names with a similar motivation include Opatje Selo in Slovenia, Apatovec and Opatija in Croatia, and Apatin in Serbia.

== History ==
The town and its surrounding villages were settled by German-speakers. The German-speaking population was deported in January 1946 towards Vienna. However, they were not accepted and had to suffer two weeks living in a carriage; 77 of them died.

== Church ==
The parish church in the settlement is dedicated to the Assumption of Mary and belongs to the Roman Catholic Archdiocese of Maribor. It dates to the 15th and 16th centuries. The Freudenau Mansion is located near the town. It is an originally 17th-century Baroque mansion and it was renovated in a Neoclassical style in the 19th century.
