= Trnovci, Sveti Tomaž =

Trnovci
- Location in Slovenia
- Coordinates: 46°30′2.84″N 16°2′32.82″E
- Country: Slovenia
- Traditional region: Styria
- Statistical region: Drava
- Municipality: Sveti Tomaž

Area
  - Total: 2.32 km^{2} (0.90 sq mi)
- Elevation: 239.6 m (786 ft)

Population (2002)
  - Total: 156

Trnovci (pronounced [ˈtəɾnɔu̯tsi], German: Ternofzen) is a dispersed settlement in the Slovene Hills (Slovene: Slovenske gorice) in the Municipality of Sveti Tomaž in northeastern Slovenia. The area belonged to the traditional region of Styria. It is now included in the Drava Statistical Region.
