= Žiberci =

- Location in Slovenia
- Coordinates: 46°41′44.42″N 15°51′25.65″E
- Country: Slovenia
- Traditional region: Styria
- Statistical region: Mura
- Municipality: Apače

Area
  - Total: 2.78 km^{2} (1.07 sq mi)
- Elevation: 225 m (738 ft)

Population (2020)
  - Total: 158
  - Density: 56.8/km^{2} (147/sq mi)

Žiberci (pronounced [ˈʒiːbɛɾtsi]) is a village in the Municipality of Apače in northeastern Slovenia.

There is a 19th-century two-storey belfry in the village.
