= Segovci =

- Location in Slovenia
- Coordinates: 46°41′29.96″N 15°55′12.58″E
- Country: Slovenia
- Traditional region: Styria
- Statistical region: Mura
- Municipality: Apače

Area
  - Total: 4.25 km^{2} (1.64 sq mi)
- Elevation: 215.2 m (706 ft)

Population (2020)
  - Total: 302
  - Density: 71.1/km^{2} (184/sq mi)

Segovci (pronounced [ˈseːɡɔu̯tsi], German: Sögersdorf) is a village on the right bank of the Mura River in the Municipality of Apače in northeastern Slovenia, on the border with Austria.
