= Mala Vas pri Grosupljem =

Mala Vas pri Grosupljem Mala Vas (until 1990)
- Village
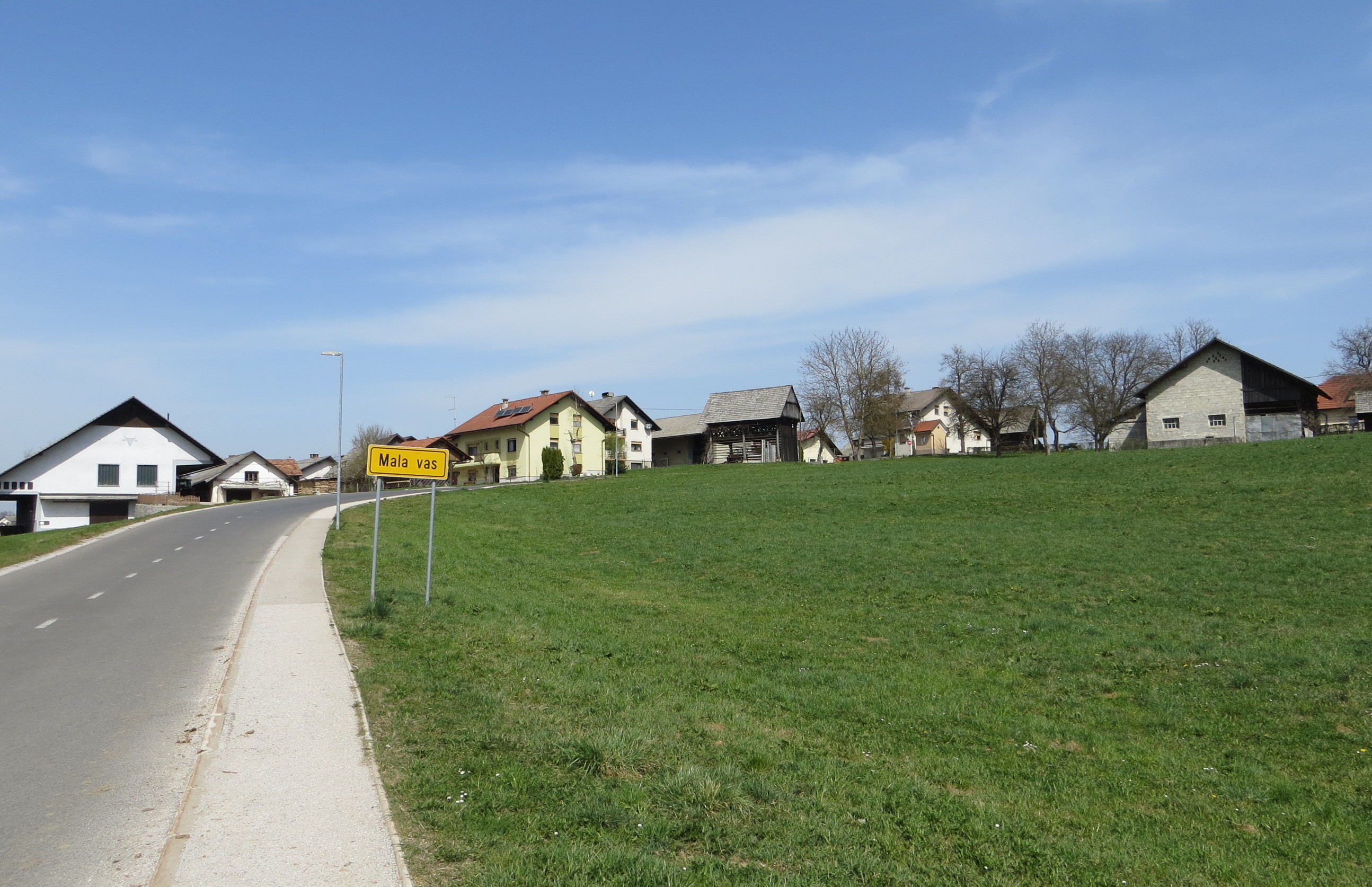

- Location in Slovenia
- Coordinates: 45°55′56.46″N 14°37′25.84″E
- Country: Slovenia
- Traditional region: Lower Carniola
- Statistical region: Central Slovenia
- Municipality: Grosuplje

Area
  - Total: 0.58 km^{2} (0.22 sq mi)
- Elevation: 345.2 m (1,133 ft)

Population (2002)
  - Total: 264

Mala Vas pri Grosupljem (pronounced [ˈmaːla ˈʋaːs pɾi ɡɾɔˈsuːpljɛm]; Slovene: Mala vas pri Grosupljem; German: Kleindorf) is a village just north of Šent Jurij in the Municipality of Grosuplje in central Slovenia. The area is part of the historical region of Lower Carniola. The municipality is now included in the Central Slovenia Statistical Region.

== Name ==
The name of the settlement was changed from Mala vas to Mala vas pri Grosupljem in 1990.

== Gallery ==
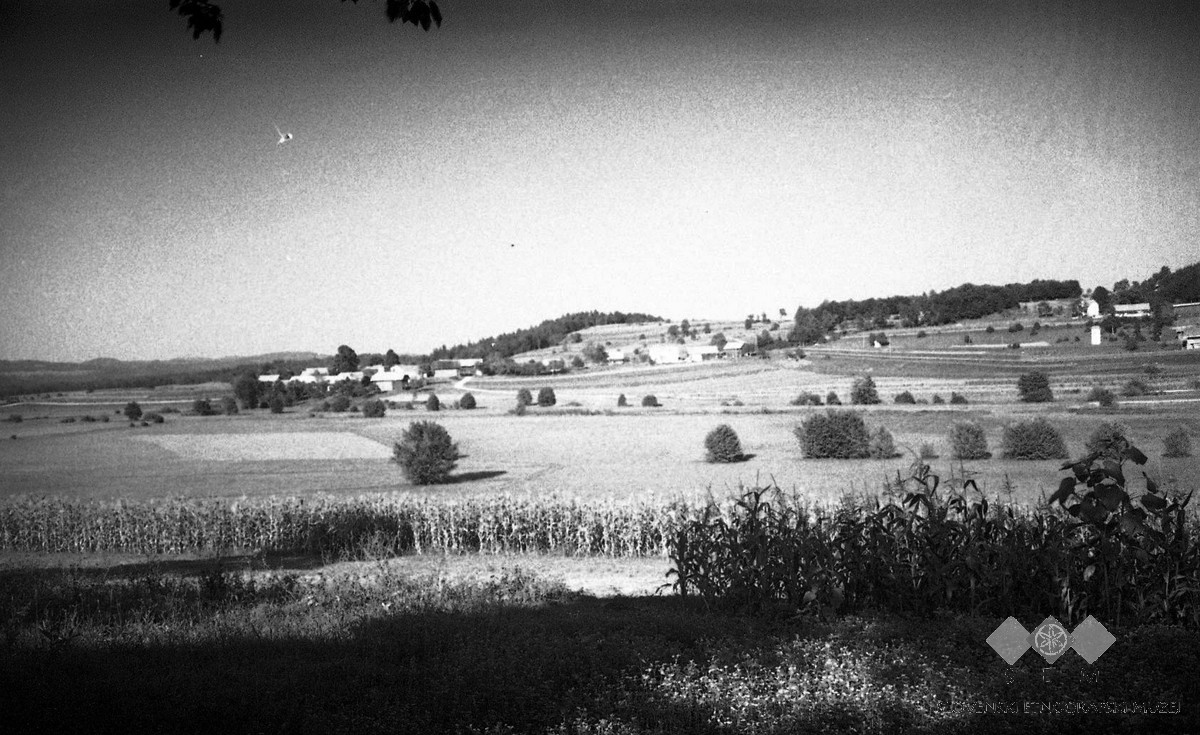
Mala Vas pri Grosupljem in 1948
