= Mala Vas pri Ormožu =

- Location in Slovenia
- Coordinates: 46°28′19.92″N 16°4′43.98″E
- Country: Slovenia
- Traditional region: Styria
- Statistical region: Drava
- Municipality: Sveti Tomaž

Area
  - Total: 1.38 km^{2} (0.53 sq mi)
- Elevation: 289.1 m (948 ft)

Population (2002)
  - Total: 124

Mala Vas pri Ormožu (pronounced [ˈmaːla ˈʋaːs pɾi ˈoːɾmɔʒu]; Slovene: Mala vas pri Ormožu) is a settlement in the Slovene Hills in the Municipality of Sveti Tomaž in northeastern Slovenia. The area is part of the traditional region of Styria and is now included in the Drava Statistical Region.
