= Sveti Tomaž, Sveti Tomaž =

Sveti Tomaž Tomaž pri Ormožu (1955–1993)
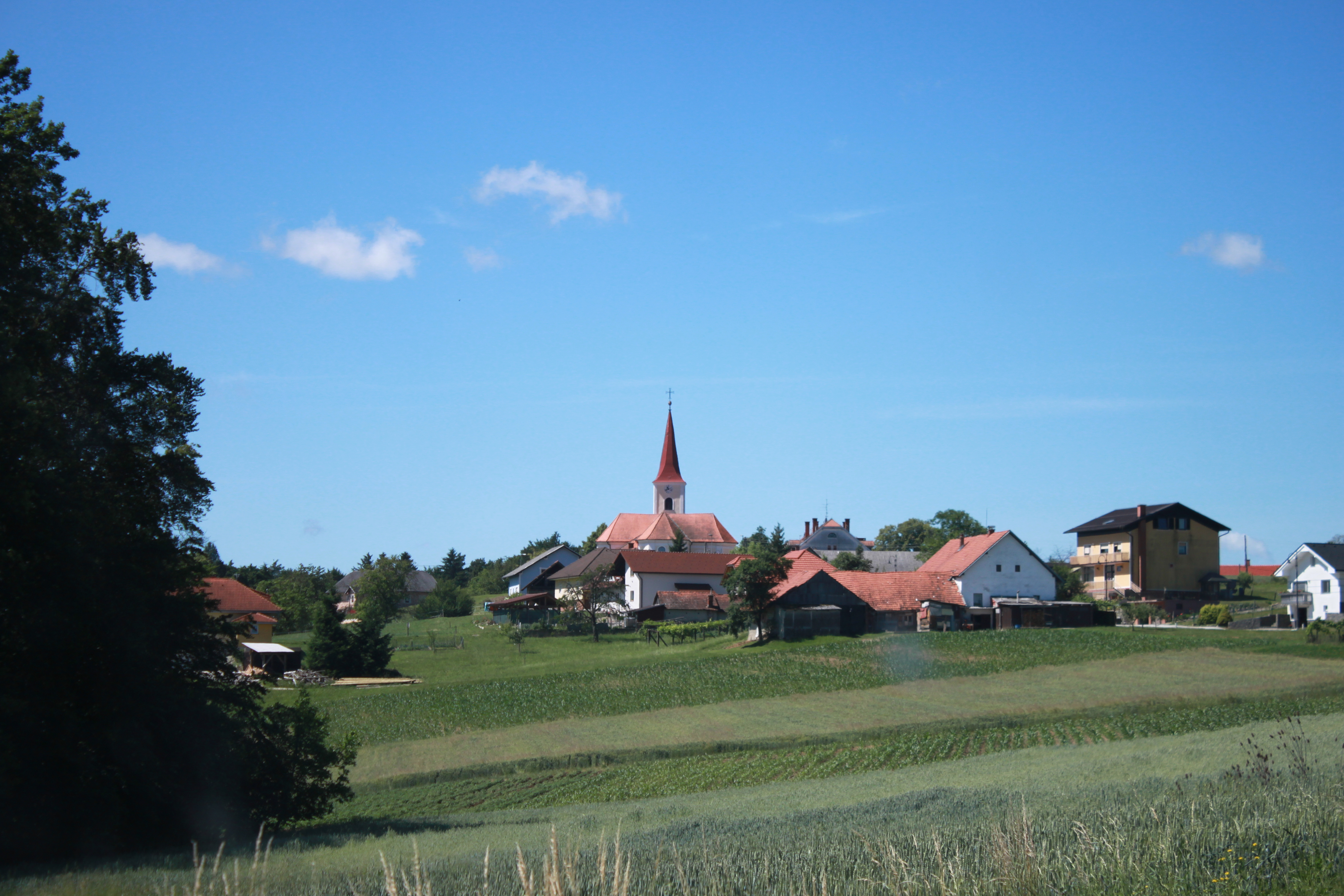

- Location of the Town of Sveti Tomaž in Slovenia
- Coordinates: 46°29′0″N 16°4′46″E
- Country: Slovenia
- Traditional region: Styria
- Statistical region: Drava
- Municipality: Sveti Tomaž
- Elevation: 294.7 m (967 ft)

Population (2002)
  - Total: 254
- Time zone: UTC+01 (CET)
  - Summer (DST): UTC+02 (CEST)

Sveti Tomaž (pronounced [ˈsʋeːti tɔˈmaːʃ]) is a settlement in northeastern Slovenia. It is the seat of the Municipality of Sveti Tomaž. It lies in the Prlekija Hills and was part of the Municipality of Ormož until 2006. The area traditionally belonged to the region of Styria. It is now included in the Drava Statistical Region.

== Name ==
The name of the settlement was changed from Sveti Tomaž pri Ormožu (literally, 'Saint Thomas near Ormož') to Tomaž pri Ormožu (literally, 'Thomas near Ormož') in 1955. The name was changed on the basis of the 1948 Law on Names of Settlements and Designations of Squares, Streets, and Buildings as part of efforts by Slovenia's postwar communist government to remove religious elements from toponyms. The name was changed to Sveti Tomaž in 1993.

== Church ==
The local parish church, from which the settlement gets its name, is dedicated to Saint Thomas. It belongs to the Roman Catholic Archdiocese of Maribor. It was built between 1715 and 1727.
