= Kandrše, Zagorje ob Savi =

Kandrše
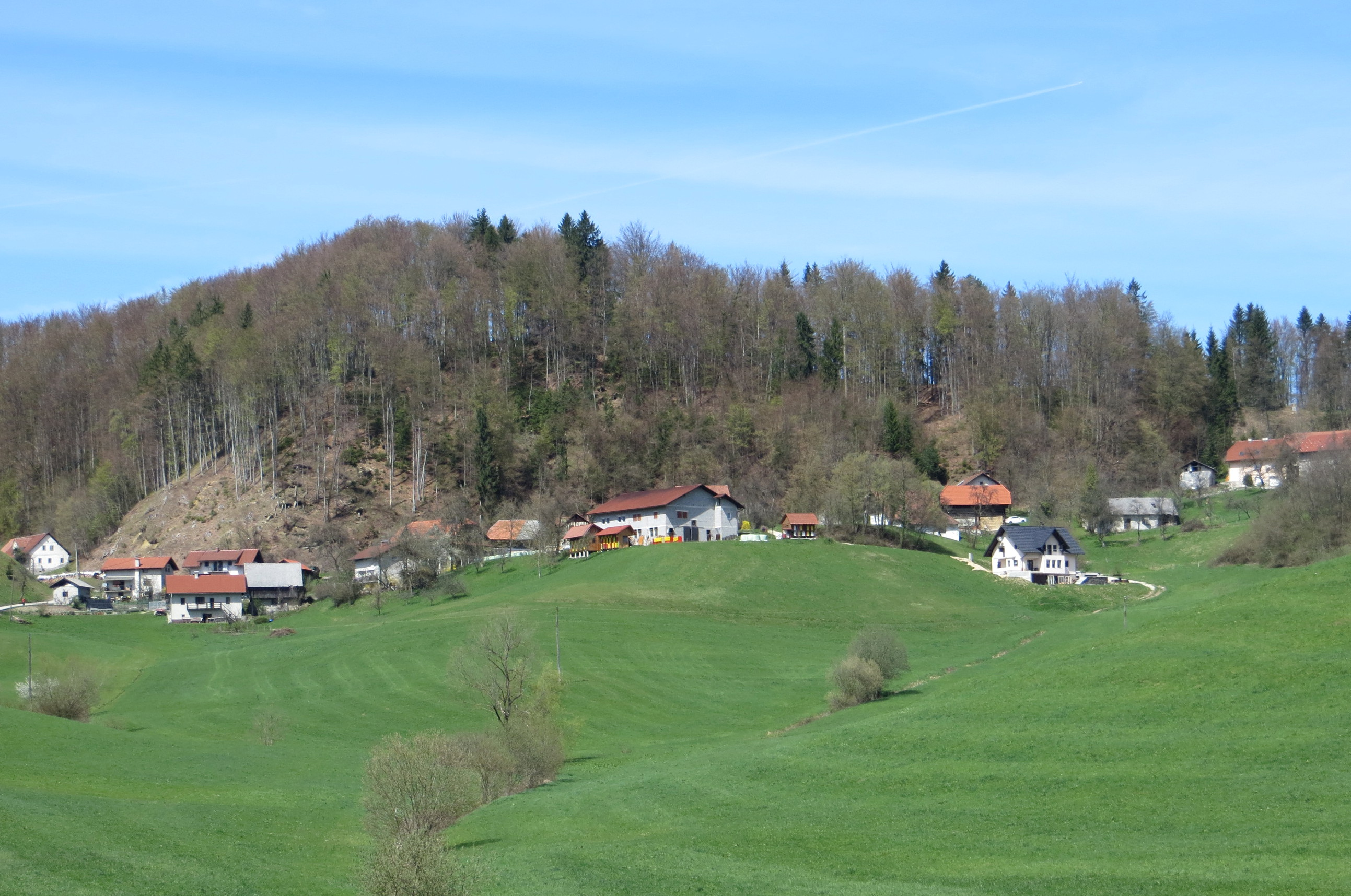

- Location in Slovenia
- Coordinates: 46°8′16.81″N 14°50′32.47″E
- Country: Slovenia
- Traditional region: Upper Carniola
- Statistical region: Central Sava
- Municipality: Zagorje ob Savi

Area
  - Total: 2.86 km^{2} (1.10 sq mi)
- Elevation: 497.9 m (1,634 ft)

Population (2002)
  - Total: 169
- Postal code: 1252
- The statistics on this page are only for the part of the settlement in the Municipality of Zagorje ob Savi

Kandrše (pronounced [ˈkaːndəɾʃɛ]; German: Kandersche) is a settlement in the Municipality of Zagorje ob Savi in central Slovenia. A small part of the settlement lies in the neighbouring Municipality of Litija. The area is part of the traditional region of Upper Carniola. The major part of the settlement is now included with the rest of the Municipality of Zagorje in the Central Sava Statistical Region.

== Name ==
Kandrše was attested in written sources in 1350 as Kandres (and as Kandes in 1400 and Kannders in 1444). The name is of unclear origin, but is presumably based on a personal name such as Old High German Chunrad or Chuonrad 'Conrad' in the genitive form as part of a compound name: Chunrades-dorf 'Conrad's village' or Chunrades-hof 'Conrad's farm'. In the past the German name was Kandersche.

== Church ==
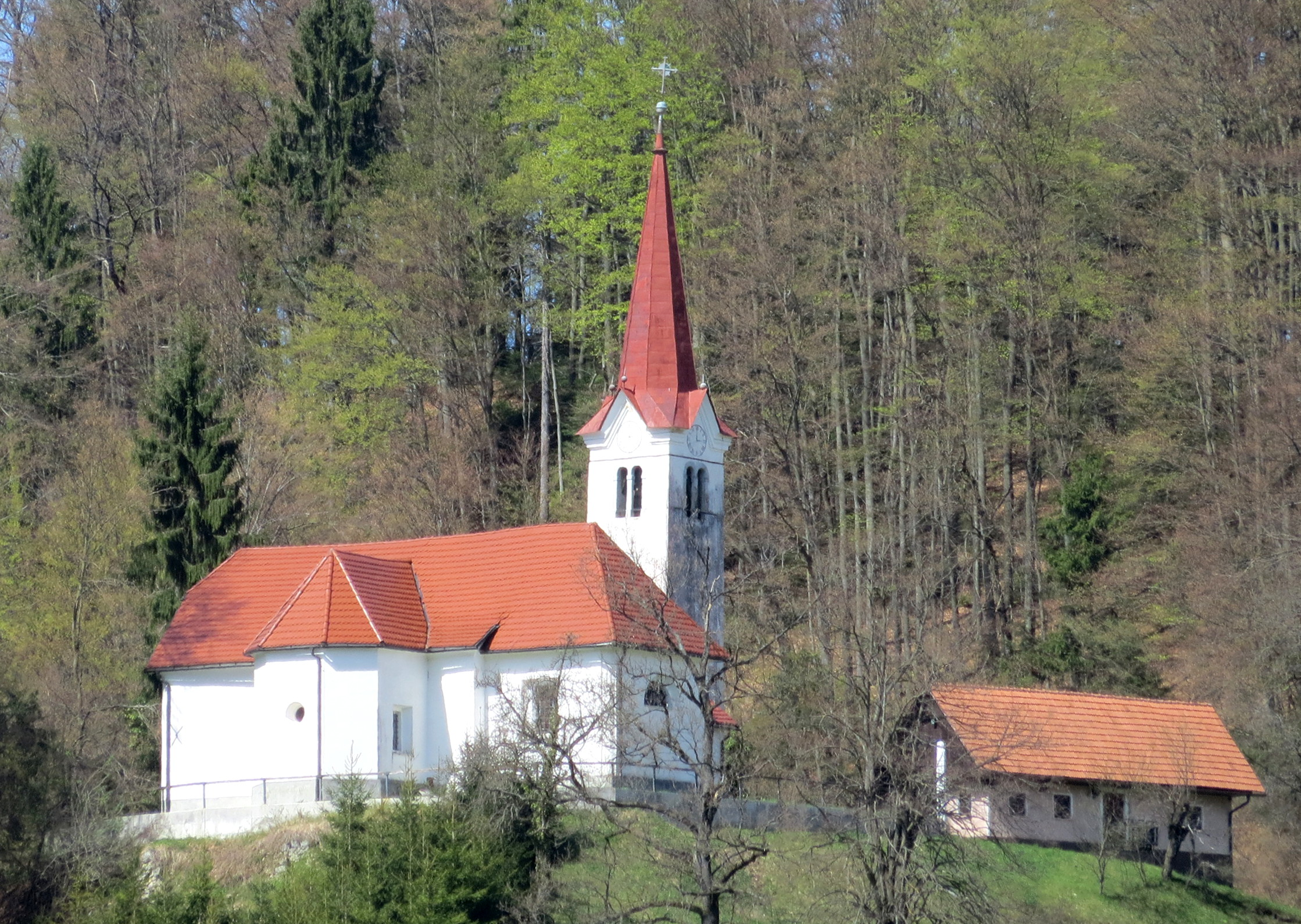
View from southeast

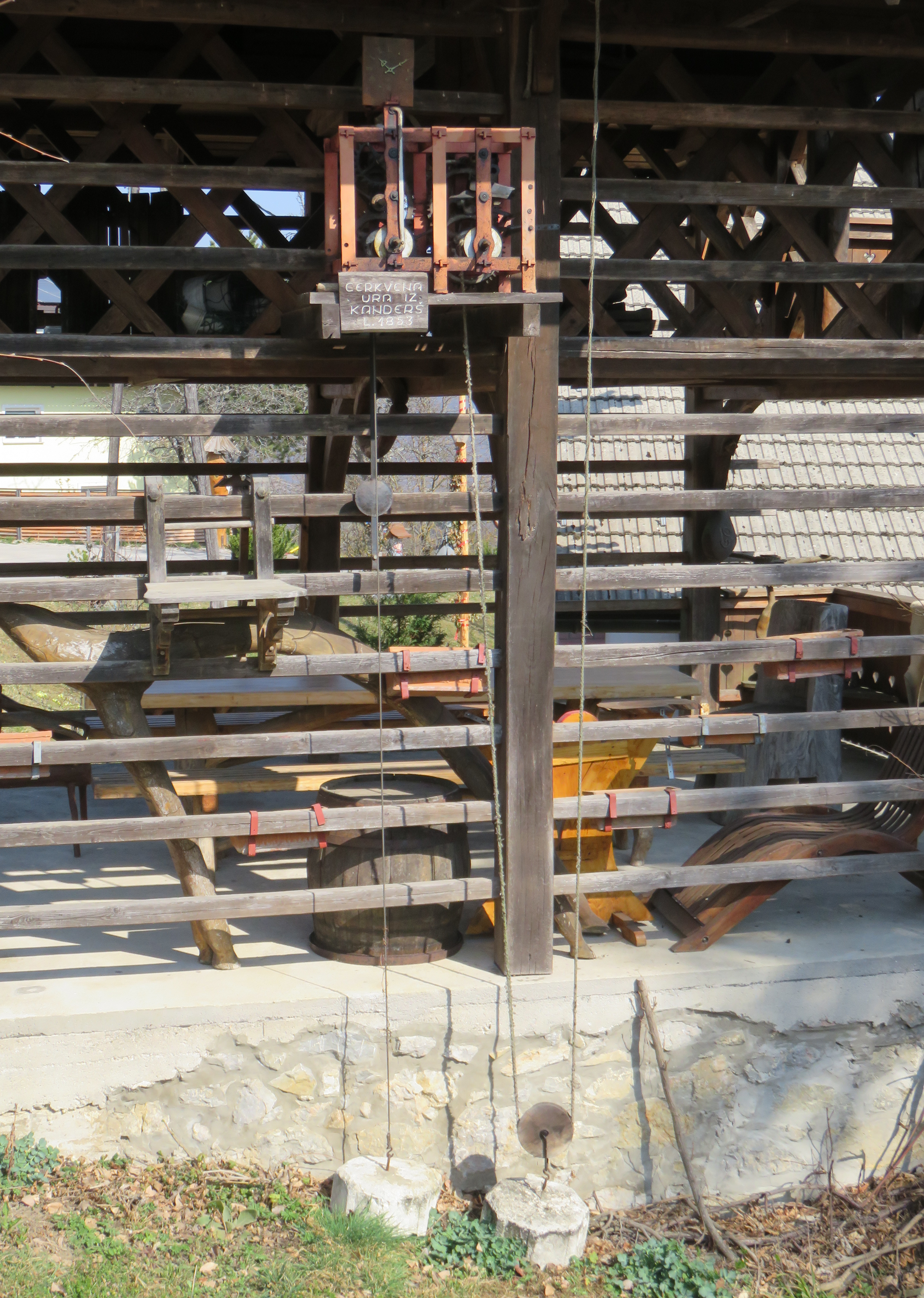
Former church clock

Saint Leonard's Church

The local church is dedicated to Saint Leonard and belongs to the Parish of Vače. It is a Gothic building that was restyled in the Baroque in the 18th century. The old clock from the church, dating from 1853, was removed and is now displayed on the side of a hayrack in Slivna.
