= Žepovci =

- Location in Slovenia
- Coordinates: 46°41′32.14″N 15°52′5.47″E
- Country: Slovenia
- Traditional region: Styria
- Statistical region: Mura
- Municipality: Apače

Area
  - Total: 4.98 km^{2} (1.92 sq mi)
- Elevation: 223.6 m (734 ft)

Population (2020)
  - Total: 357
  - Density: 71.7/km^{2} (186/sq mi)

Žepovci (pronounced [ˈʒɛːpɔu̯tsi]) (German: Schöpfendorf) is a village in the Municipality of Apače in northeastern Slovenia.

The village chapel with a belfry over its entrance is dedicated to the Virgin Mary. It was built in the second half of the 19th century, with the belfry rebuilt at a later date.
