= Rakovci, Slovenia =

Rakovci
- Location in Slovenia
- Coordinates: 46°29′42.2″N 16°3′33.86″E
- Country: Slovenia
- Traditional region: Styria
- Statistical region: Drava
- Municipality: Sveti Tomaž

Area
  - Total: 1.71 km^{2} (0.66 sq mi)
- Elevation: 297.1 m (975 ft)

Population (2002)
  - Total: 148

Rakovci (pronounced [ˈɾaːkɔu̯tsi]) is a settlement in the Slovene Hills (Slovene: Slovenske gorice) in the Municipality of Sveti Tomaž in northeastern Slovenia. The area is part of the traditional region of Styria and is now included in the Drava Statistical Region.

The Neo-Gothic village chapel-shrine with a belfry was built in 1888.
