= Stogovci, Apače =

Stogovci
- Location in Slovenia
- Coordinates: 46°41′50.35″N 15°50′28.79″E
- Country: Slovenia
- Traditional region: Styria
- Statistical region: Mura
- Municipality: Apače

Area
  - Total: 2.06 km^{2} (0.80 sq mi)
- Elevation: 226.5 m (743 ft)

Population (2020)
  - Total: 133
  - Density: 64.6/km^{2} (167/sq mi)

Stogovci (pronounced [ˈstoːɡɔu̯tsi]) is a settlement in the Municipality of Apače in northeastern Slovenia, close to the border with Austria.

The village chapel with a small belfry lies in the southern part of the village. It was built in the early 20th century.
