= Sejanci =

- Location in Slovenia
- Coordinates: 46°27′30.98″N 16°4′12.55″E
- Country: Slovenia
- Traditional region: Styria
- Statistical region: Drava
- Municipality: Sveti Tomaž

Area
  - Total: 3 km^{2} (1.2 sq mi)
- Elevation: 253.9 m (833 ft)

Population (2002)
  - Total: 95

Sejanci (pronounced [ˈseːjantsi]) is a settlement in the Slovene Hills (Slovene: Slovenske gorice) in the Municipality of Sveti Tomaž in northeastern Slovenia. The area belonged to the traditional region of Styria. It is now included in the Drava Statistical Region.

There are a small chapel and a chapel-shrine in the village, both dating from the early 20th century.
