= Artiče =

Artiče Artitsch bei Rann
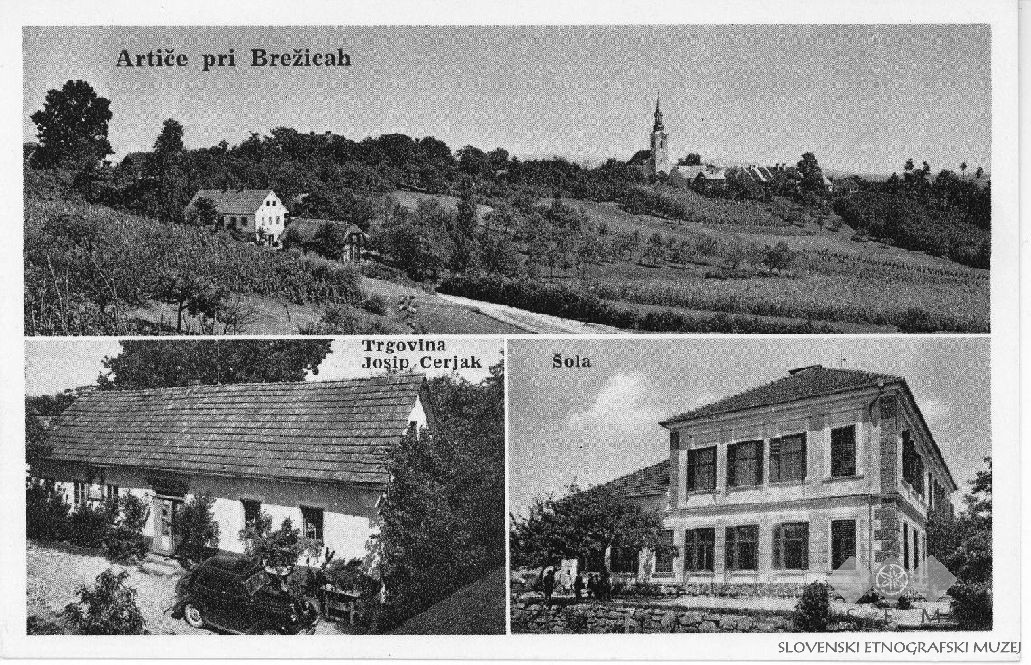
- Postcard of Artiče

- Location in Slovenia
- Coordinates: 45°57′0.93″N 15°35′8.69″E
- Country: Slovenia
- Traditional region: Styria
- Statistical region: Lower Sava
- Municipality: Brežice

Area
  - Total: 2.08 km^{2} (0.80 sq mi)
- Elevation: 216.1 m (709 ft)

Population (2020)
  - Total: 330
  - Density: 160/km^{2} (410/sq mi)

Artiče (pronounced [aɾˈtiːtʃɛ]; German: Artitsch bei Rann) is a settlement in the Municipality of Brežice in eastern Slovenia. It lies in the hills north of the town of Brežice. The area is part of the traditional region of Styria. It is now included in the Lower Sava Statistical Region.

The parish church in the settlement is dedicated to the Holy Spirit and belongs to the Roman Catholic Diocese of Celje. It was originally built in the late 16th century, but was remodelled in the early 20th century.
