= Drobtinci =

Drobtinci Proskersdorf
- Location in Slovenia
- Coordinates: 46°41′36.56″N 15°50′54.93″E
- Country: Slovenia
- Traditional region: Styria
- Statistical region: Mura
- Municipality: Apače

Area
  - Total: 1.71 km^{2} (0.66 sq mi)
- Elevation: 229.1 m (752 ft)

Population (2020)
  - Total: 124
  - Density: 72.5/km^{2} (188/sq mi)

Drobtinci (pronounced [dɾɔˈptiːntsi]) (German: Proskersdorf) is a village in the Municipality of Apače in northeastern Slovenia.
