= Ponikve, Semič =

Ponikve
- Location in Slovenia
- Coordinates: 45°38′8.67″N 15°4′42.81″E
- Country: Slovenia
- Traditional region: Lower Carniola
- Statistical region: Southeast Slovenia
- Municipality: Semič
- Elevation: 810.2 m (2,658 ft)

Population (2002)
  - Total: 0

Ponikve (pronounced [pɔˈniːkʋɛ]; German: Sporeben) is a remote abandoned settlement in the Municipality of Semič in southern Slovenia. The area is part of the traditional region of Lower Carniola and is now included in the Southeast Slovenia Statistical Region. Its territory is now part of the village of Planina.

== Name ==
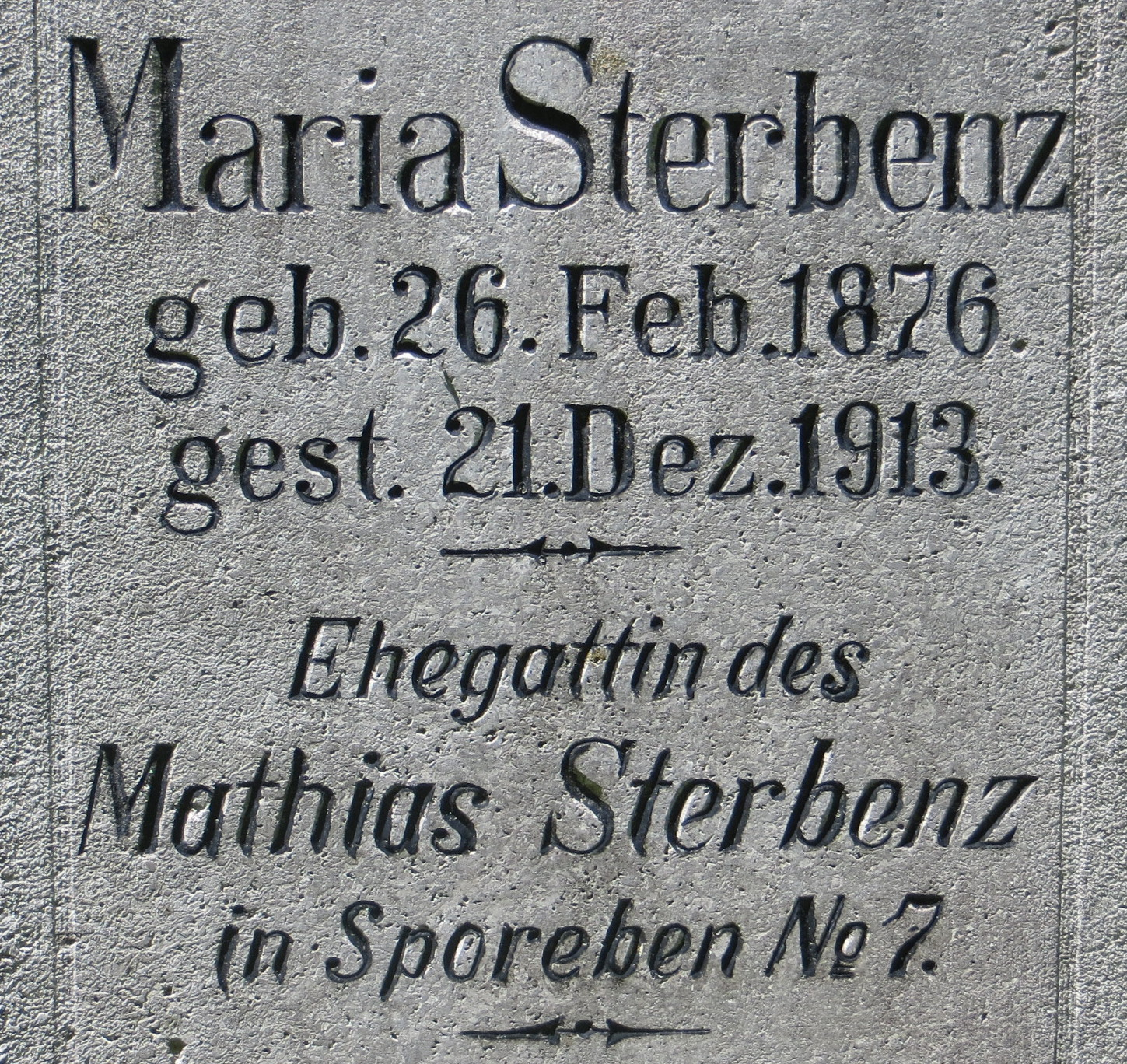
Gottschee German gravestone with the toponym Sporeben

The Slovenian name Ponikve is a plural form derived from the word ponikva 'influent stream' or 'sinkhole' (into which such a stream disappears). In its plural form it refers to a gently rolling landscape consisting of the basins of an influent stream. Like other villages named Ponikve and similar names (e.g., Ponikva), it refers to a local landscape element. The German name Sporeben was attested as Payrs-Eben 'Bavarian plain' in 1574. This developed via dialect ins Poar Eben 'in the Bavarian plain' into the name Sporeben and refers to a Bavarian ethnic presence among neighboring non-Bavarian settlers.

== History ==
Ponikve was a Gottschee German village. In 1574 the village consisted of four half-farms. It had 12 houses in 1770, but only eight in 1931. The original residents were expelled in the fall of 1941. Italian troops burned the village during the Rog Offensive in the summer of 1942 and it was not rebuilt after the war. After the village was burned, the Partisans built the Kremen hospital in the nearby forest. The hospital continued to function until February 1945. The Partisan Veterans' Organization restored the headquarters building of the hospital in 1956.
