= Kandrše, Litija =

Kandrše
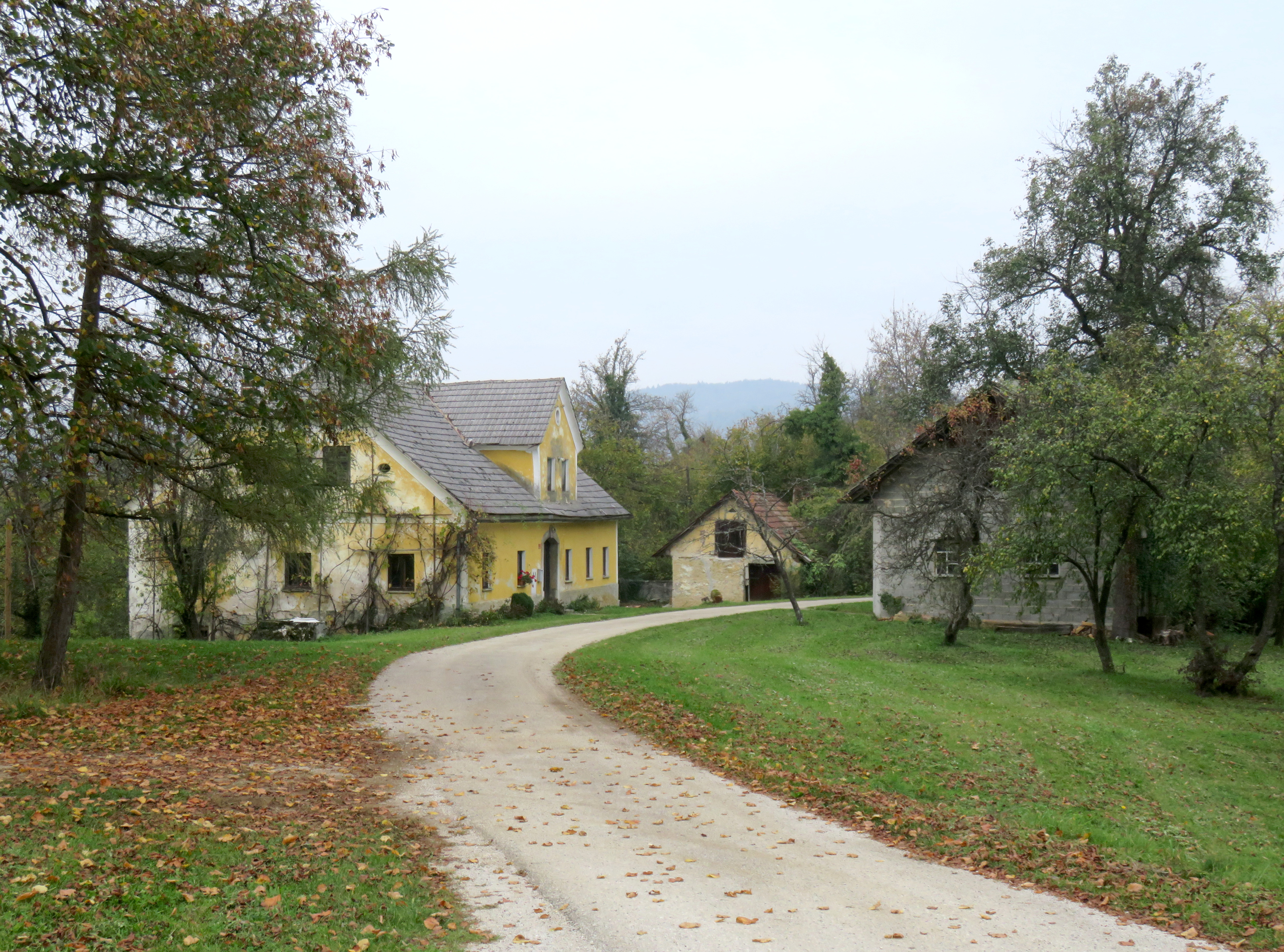

- Location in Slovenia
- Coordinates: 46°7′57.33″N 14°49′58.98″E
- Country: Slovenia
- Traditional region: Upper Carniola
- Statistical region: Central Sava
- Municipality: Litija

Area
  - Total: 0.49 km^{2} (0.19 sq mi)
- Elevation: 504.2 m (1,654 ft)

Population (2002)
  - Total: 5
- Postal code: 1252
- The statistics on this page are only for the part of the settlement in the Municipality of Litija

Kandrše (pronounced [ˈkaːndəɾʃɛ]; German: Kandersche) is a small settlement in the Municipality of Litija in central Slovenia. Only part of the village lies in the Municipality of Litija. The major part is in the neighbouring Municipality of Zagorje ob Savi. The area is part of the traditional region of Upper Carniola. It is now included with the rest of the municipality in the Central Sava Statistical Region; until January 2014 the municipality was part of the Central Slovenia Statistical Region.

== Name ==
Kandrše was attested in written sources in 1350 as Kandres (and as Kandes in 1400 and Kannders in 1444). The name is of unclear origin, but is presumably based on a personal name such as Old High German Chunrad or Chuonrad 'Conrad' in the genitive form as part of a compound name: Chunrades-dorf 'Conrad's village' or Chunrades-hof 'Conrad's farm'. In the past the German name was Kandersche.
