= Vratja Vas =

- Location in Slovenia
- Coordinates: 46°42′29.32″N 15°47′59.2″E
- Country: Slovenia
- Traditional region: Styria
- Statistical region: Mura
- Municipality: Apače

Area
  - Total: 1.96 km^{2} (0.76 sq mi)
- Elevation: 231.9 m (761 ft)

Population (2020)
  - Total: 84
  - Density: 43/km^{2} (110/sq mi)

Vratja Vas (pronounced [ˈwɾaːtja ˈʋaːs]; Slovene: Vratja vas, in older sources Vratje, German: Frattendorf) is a village on the right bank of the Mura River in the Municipality of Apače in northeastern Slovenia, right on the border with Austria.
