= Ortnek =

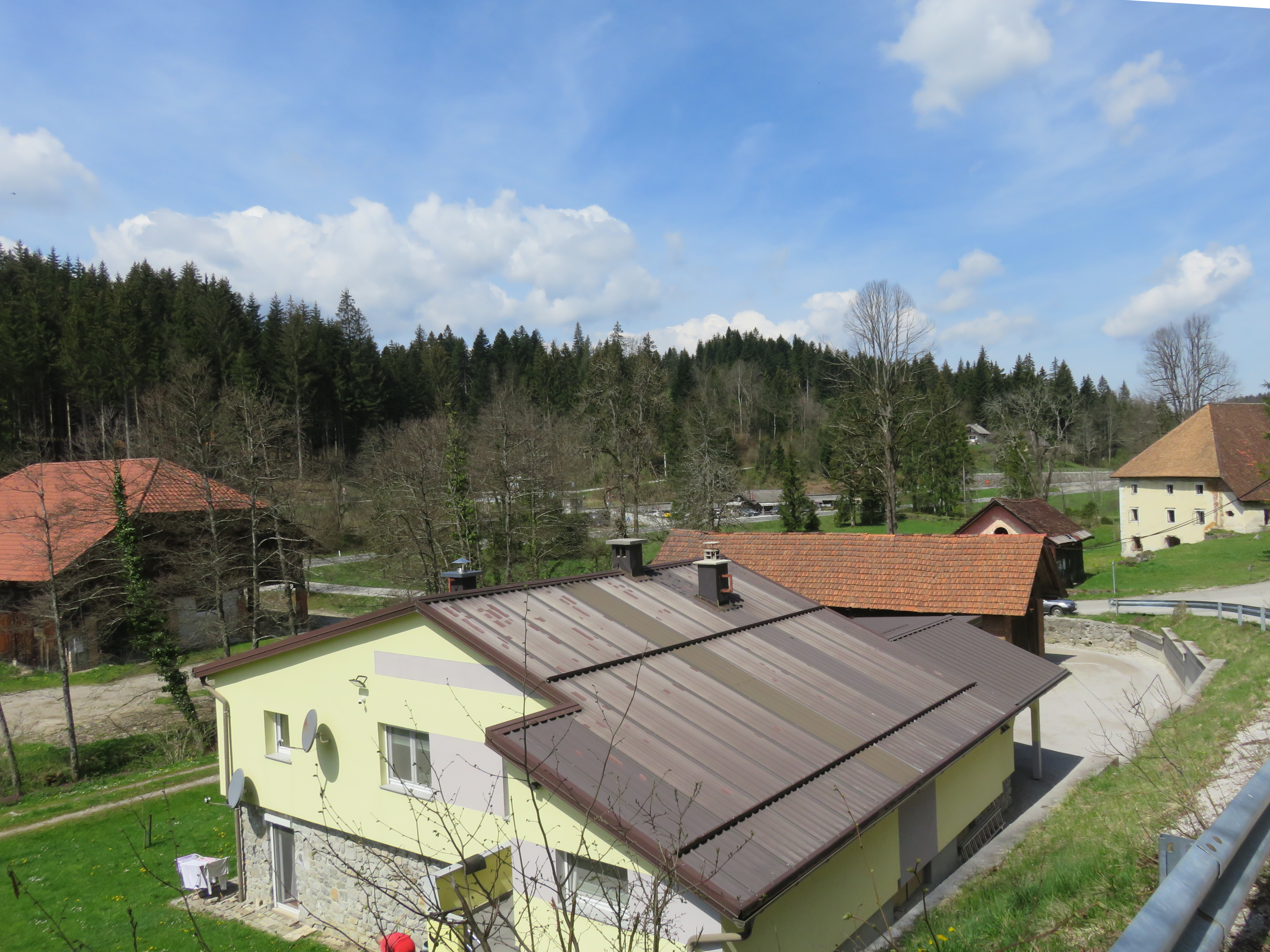

- Location in Slovenia
- Coordinates: 45°46′58.95″N 14°40′20.74″E
- Country: Slovenia
- Traditional region: Lower Carniola
- Statistical region: Southeast Slovenia
- Municipality: Ribnica

Area
  - Total: 3.34 km^{2} (1.29 sq mi)
- Elevation: 764.3 m (2,508 ft)

Population (2002)
  - Total: 18
- Postal code: 1316

Ortnek (pronounced [ɔɾˈtnɛk]; German: Ortenegg) is a settlement in the Municipality of Ribnica in southern Slovenia. The railway line from Ljubljana to Kočevje runs through the settlement and the village has a railway station. The area is part of the traditional region of Lower Carniola and is now included in the Southeast Slovenia Statistical Region.

== Strategic petroleum reserve ==
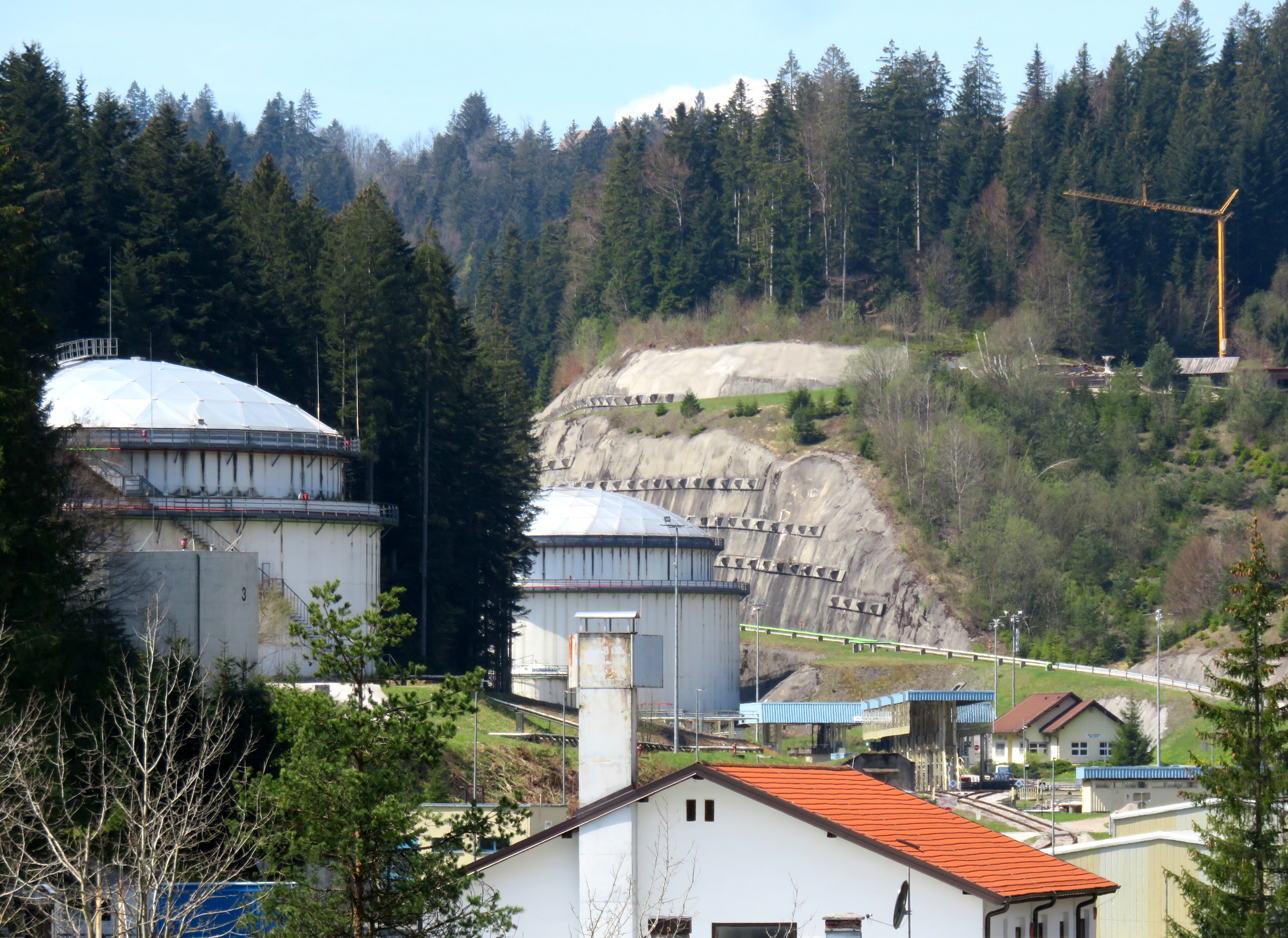
Ortnek petroleum reserve

A major storage site for Slovenia's strategic petroleum reserves is located in a valley immediately west of Ortnek. In the past, it was used as a military petroleum reserve. The Ortnek facility is one of Slovenia's largest petroleum storage sites, the total stockpiles of which are envisaged as sufficient to supply Slovenia's needs for three months. Diesel fuel and gasoline are stored at the site, as well as kerosene at times. In addition to the visible reservoirs, there are seven underground reservoirs built into the surrounding hills. Access to the site is strictly controlled.

== Ortnek Castle and Ortnek Manor ==
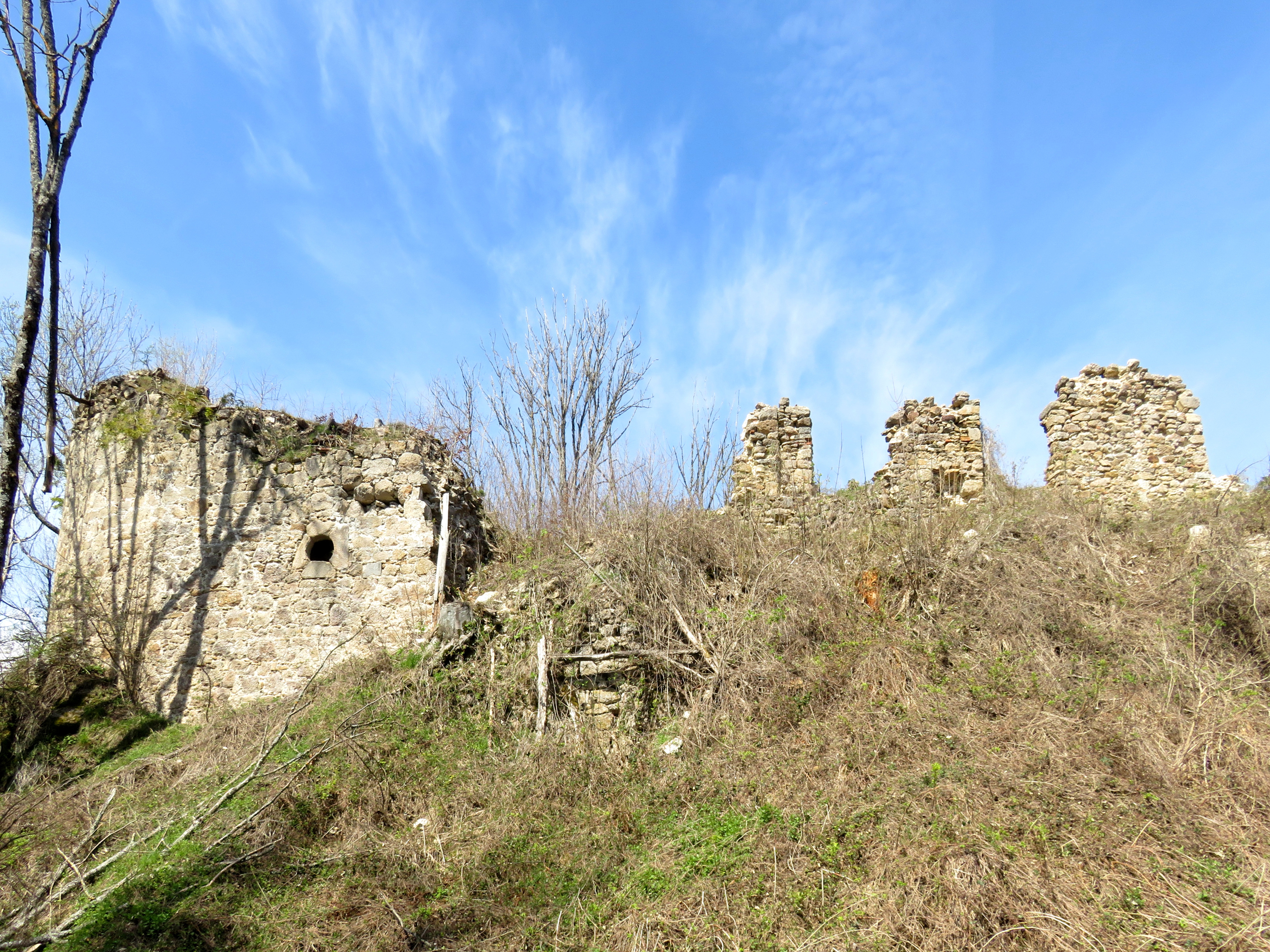
Ruins of Ortnek Castle

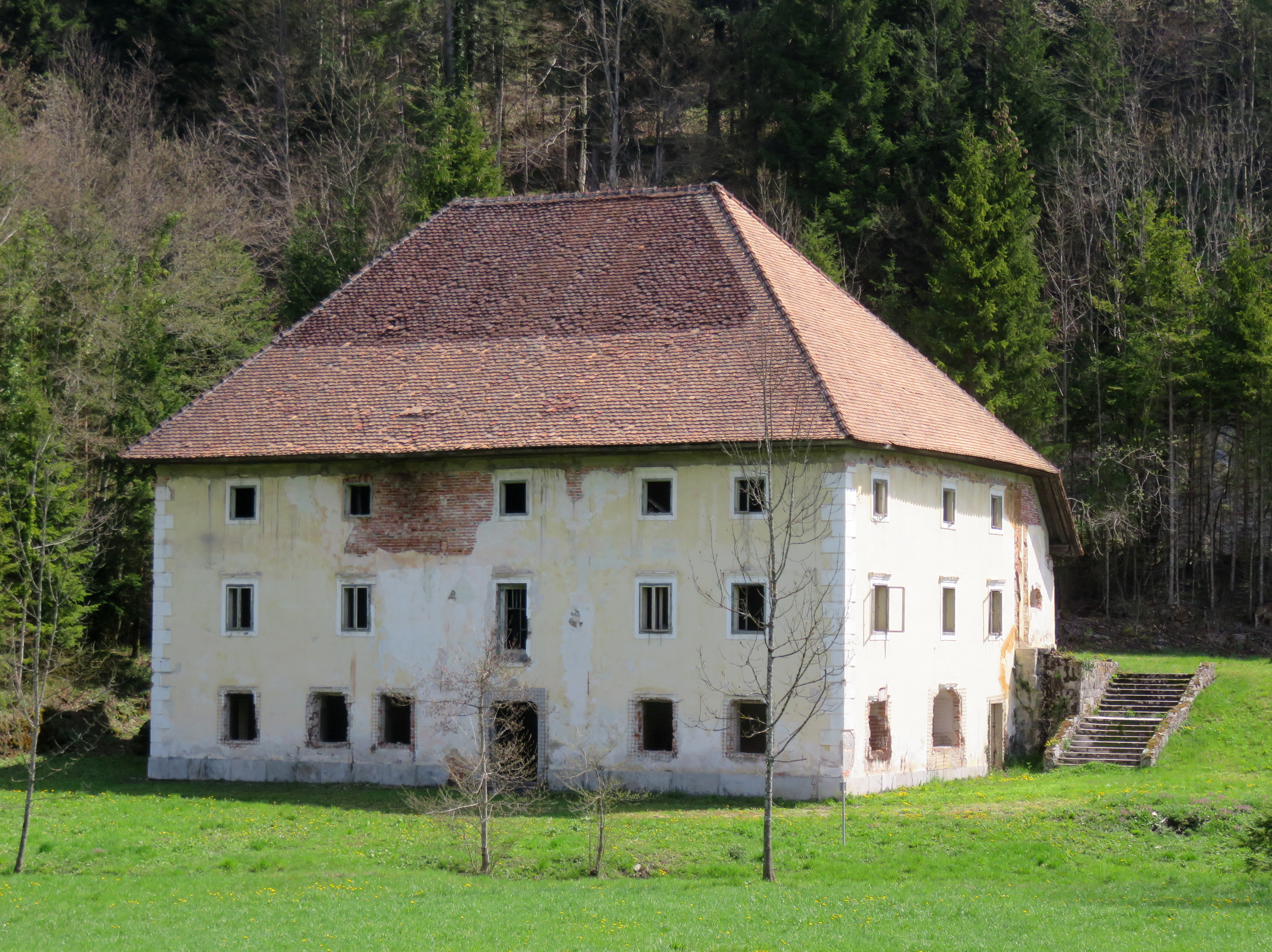
Ortnek Manor

The ruins of Ortnek Castle stand on Big Žrnovec Hill (Slovene: Veliki Žrnovec) southwest of the settlement. The castle was first mentioned in written documents dating to 1355, but it was built in the 13th century on a site that has also yielded Iron Age artefacts. The castle was abandoned in the 19th century.

Ortnek Manor stands along Zastava Creek, east of the road from Ljubljana to Kočevje. It is a three-story structure with a four-sided roof that was built at the end of the 17th century on the site of a former manor farm. After the Kosler family abandoned Ortnek Castle in 1884, the manor was reworked into a residence for them. In addition to the manor, the grounds include outbuildings and a park.

== Church ==
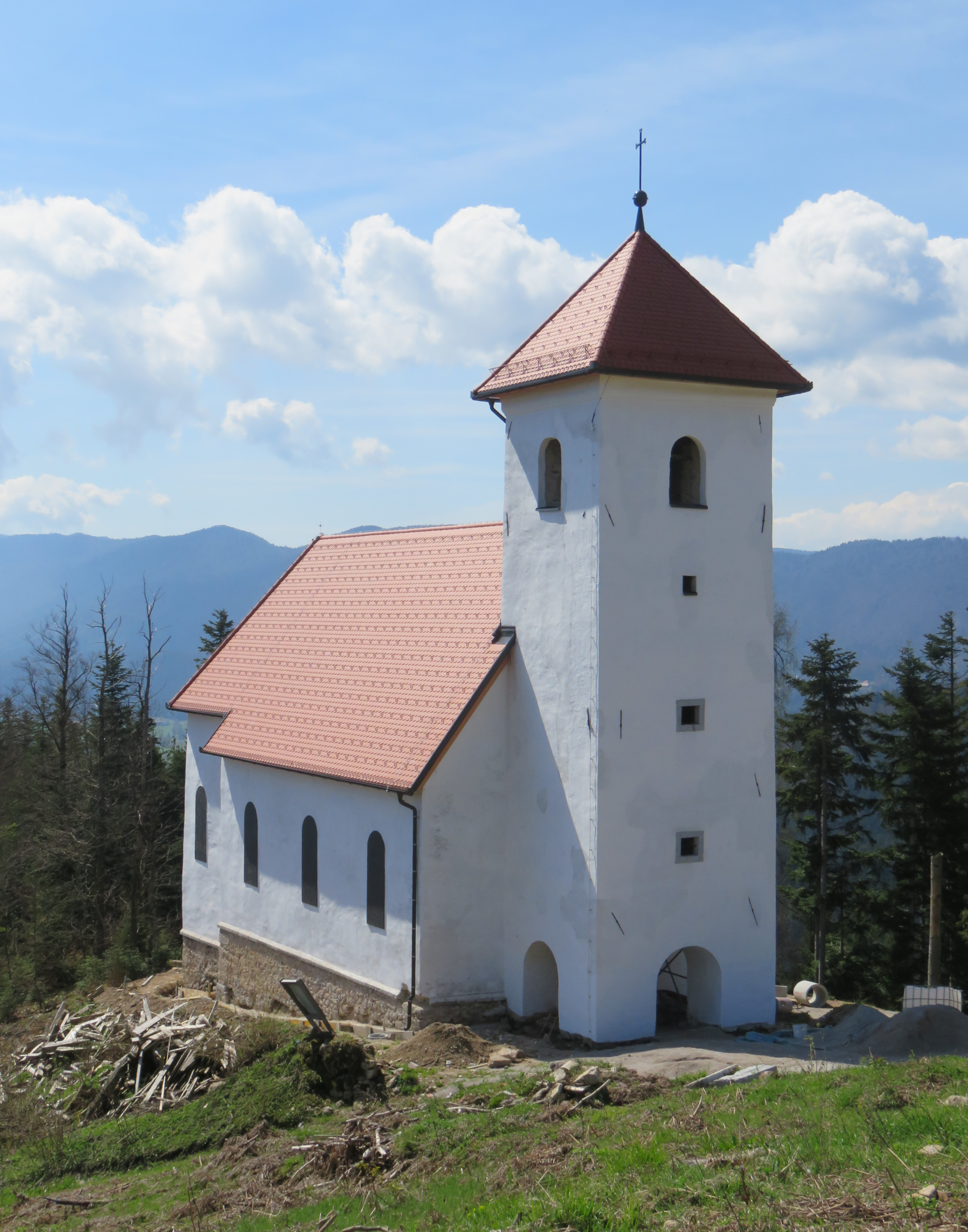
Saint George's Church

The best-preserved part of the Ortnek Castle complex is the 17th-century castle chapel, dedicated to Saint George (Slovene: sveti Jurij). The church stands on Big Žrnovec Hill southeast of the ruins of Ortnek Castle. Its nave is divided into three sections by pilasters, the chancel is walled on three sides, and the bell tower stands to the northwest. The church's furnishings—three altars, paintings from 1641 by Master HGG, and the pulpit—were restored between 1999 and 2003, and they are stored in various locations.
