= Podgorje, Apače =

Podgorje
- Location in Slovenia
- Coordinates: 46°42′17.08″N 15°49′20.94″E
- Country: Slovenia
- Traditional region: Styria
- Statistical region: Mura
- Municipality: Apače

Area
  - Total: 1.35 km^{2} (0.52 sq mi)
- Elevation: 230.7 m (757 ft)

Population (2020)
  - Total: 187

Podgorje (pronounced [ˈpoːdɡɔɾjɛ]) is a settlement in the Municipality of Apače in northeastern Slovenia.
