= Lešane, Apače =

Lešane
- Location in Slovenia
- Coordinates: 46°39′48.65″N 15°53′51.07″E
- Country: Slovenia
- Traditional region: Styria
- Statistical region: Mura
- Municipality: Apače

Area
  - Total: 1.94 km^{2} (0.75 sq mi)
- Elevation: 278.8 m (915 ft)

Population (2020)
  - Total: 186
  - Density: 95.9/km^{2} (248/sq mi)

Lešane (pronounced [ˈleːʃanɛ], in older sources Lešena, German: Windisch Haseldorf) is a village in the Municipality of Apače in northeastern Slovenia.
