= Lutverci =

- Location in Slovenia
- Coordinates: 46°41′4.88″N 15°56′56.82″E
- Country: Slovenia
- Traditional region: Styria
- Statistical region: Mura
- Municipality: Apače

Area
  - Total: 2.54 km^{2} (0.98 sq mi)
- Elevation: 212 m (696 ft)

Population (2020)
  - Total: 365
  - Density: 144/km^{2} (372/sq mi)

Lutverci (pronounced [ˈluːtʋɛɾtsi]) is a village on the right bank of the Mura River in the Apače in northeastern Slovenia.
