= Kuta =

Kuta may refer to:

== Places ==
- Kuta, Bali, a village in Badung Regency, Indonesia
  - Kuta District, in Bali
  - Kuta North, a district in Bali
  - Kuta South, a district in Bali
- Kuta, Lombok, a village in the province of West Nusa Tenggara, Indonesia
- Kuta, Foča, a village in Bosnia and Herzegovina
- Kuta, Kalinovik, a village in Bosnia and Herzegovina
- Kuta, Nikšić, a village in Montenegro
- Kuta (river), a tributary of the Lena in Siberia, Russia

== Other uses ==
- Kuta (caste), a Hindu caste in India
- Kuta (clothing), a type of headgear
- Kuta (surname) (includes a list of persons with the surname)
- Tunica Municipal Airport, Mississippi, United States
- KUTA-LD, a low-power television station (channel 13, virtual 30) licensed to serve Ogden, Utah, United States
- K08QL-D, a low-power television station (channel 8) licensed to serve Logan, Utah, which held the call sign KUTA-LP from 2005 to 2009, and KUTA-LD from 2009 to 2020
- KUTA, an AM radio station in Salt Lake City, Utah (1938-1956)
- Kuta, most often referring to the National Council (Mulongwanji) of the Lozi Kingdom, though can refer to its other councils

== See also ==
- Kota (disambiguation)
- Kouta (disambiguation)
- Kutas (disambiguation)
- Kutha
