= KOT =

Kot or KOT may refer to:

== Places ==
=== Afghanistan ===
- Kot District, Nangarhar Province

=== Armenia ===
- Kot, an ancient settlement in modern-day Nerkin Getashen, Armenia

=== Hong Kong ===
- Kowloon Tong station, by MTR station code

=== India ===
- Kot, Agra, a village in Agra district Uttar Pradesh
- Kot, Fatehpur, Uttar Pradesh

=== Pakistan ===
- Kot (union council), an administrative unit in Malakand District, Khyber Pakhtunkhwa
- Kot Diji, an archaeological site on the Indus River
- Kot Lakhpat, Lahore, Punjab
- Kot Rajput, a town in Lahore District, Punjab
- Kot Sabzal, a town in Bahawalpur District, Punjab
- Kot, Swat, a hill station in northern Pakistan

=== Poland ===
- Kot, Warmian-Masurian Voivodeship

=== Slovenia ===
- Kot (valley), a valley in the Julian Alps, northwestern Slovenia
- Kot, Ig, a village in the Municipality of Ig, central Slovenia
- Kot, Lendava, a village in the Municipality of Lendava, northeastern Slovenia
- Kot na Pohorju, a village in the Municipality of Slovenska Bistrica, northeastern Slovenia
- Kot ob Kolpi, a village in the Municipality of Črnomelj, southeastern Slovenia
- Kot pri Damlju, a village in the Municipality of Črnomelj, southeastern Slovenia
- Kot pri Prevaljah, a village in the Municipality of Prevalje, northern Slovenia
- Kot pri Rakitnici, a village in the Municipality of Ribnica, southern Slovenia
- Kot pri Ribnici, a village in the Municipality of Ribnica, southern Slovenia
- Kot pri Veliki Slevici, a village in the Municipality of Velike Lašče, southeastern Slovenia
- Kot, Vodice, a former village in the Municipality of Vodice, central Slovenia

== Other uses ==
- Eric Kot (born 1966), a Chinese actor
- Keepers of Tradition, an expansion of the trading card game Vampire: The Eternal Struggle
- Kot, a Polish surname
- Kot (lodging), student housing in Belgium
- Lagwan language, a Chadic language spoken in northern Cameroon and southwestern Chad

== See also ==
- Kota (disambiguation)
