= Kota =

Kota or KOTA may refer to:

== Places ==
=== India ===
- Kota, Rajasthan, a city in Rajasthan state
  - Kota district, a district of Rajasthan state
  - Kota Lok Sabha constituency, a Lok Sabha parliamentary constituency of Rajasthan
  - Kota State, an Indian princely state
- Kota, Nellore district, mandal headquarters in Nellore district of Andhra Pradesh
- Kota mandal, Andhra Pradesh, mandal in Nellore district of Andhra Pradesh
- Kota, Bilaspur, a city in Chhattisgarh
- Kota, Karnataka, an area in Karnataka
- Kota, Uttar Pradesh, a town in Sonbhadra district, Uttar Pradesh

=== Brunei ===
- Kota Batu, Brunei-Muara, a sub-district of Brunei-Muara District

=== Indonesia ===
- Administrative division usually translated as "city", above district (kecamatan), below province, equivalent to regency (kabupaten)
- Kota Tua Jakarta, an old area in Jakarta
- Kotagede, a district in Yogyakarta

=== Japan ===
- Kōta, Aichi, a town in Aichi Prefecture

=== Malaysia ===
- Kota, Negeri Sembilan, a small town in Rembau, Negeri Sembilan
- Kota Bharu, the capital of Kelantan
- Kota Kinabalu, the capital of Sabah

=== Nepal ===
- Kota, Tanahun
- Kot, Bhojpur

=== Philippines ===
- Kota Island

== People and languages ==
- Kōta (given name), a masculine Japanese given name
- Kota Brahmin, a sub-caste of Brahmins in Karnataka
- Kota people (India), a tribe in the Nilgiri hills of Tamil Nadu, South India
  - Kota language (India), a Dravidian language spoken in the southern Indian state of Tamil Nadu
- Kota people (Gabon) (Bakota) whose members live primarily in the northeastern region of Gabon in Central Africa
  - Kota language (Gabon), a Bantu language of the Bakota people of Gabon
- Kota language (Central African Republic) (Ngando), a Bantu language of the Central African Republic
- Kota Vamsa, 12th century dynasty of Amaravathi, India

== Media ==
- KOTA (AM), a radio station (1380 AM) licensed to serve Rapid City, South Dakota, United States
- KOTA-TV, a television station (channel 7, virtual 3) licensed to serve Rapid City, South Dakota
- KHME, a television station (channel 2, virtual 23) licensed to serve Rapid City, South Dakota, which held the call sign KOTA-TV until 2016

== Other uses ==
- Kota the Friend, a Brooklyn-based independent rapper
- Association of Timorese Heroes, (Klibur Oan Timor Asu’wain, KOTA) a conservative political party in East Timor
- Kota Srinivasa Rao (born 1947), Tollywood actor
- Kota Junction railway station, Kota, Rajasthan
- Kota the triceratops, an animatronic toy
- Kota, or goahti, a native Saami (Lapp) tent, similar to a tipi
- Kota Vamsa, the medieval dynasty which ruled in parts of the modern day Indian state of Andhra Pradesh
- Bunny chow or kota, a South African fast food dish
- Spatlo or kota, a South African sandwich

== See also ==
- Kottas (Kote Hristov, 1863–1905), Slavophone insurgent leader in Western Macedonia
- Kot (disambiguation)
- Kouta (disambiguation)
- Kuta (disambiguation)
- Kotha (disambiguation)
- Koti (disambiguation)
- Kotla (disambiguation)
