= Koryfi =

Koryfi may refer to several places in Greece:

- Koryfi, Imathia, settlement in the Imathia regional unit, Central Macedonia
- Koryfi, Kozani, in the Kozani regional unit, Macedonia
- Koryfi, Trikala, a village in the Trikala regional unit, Thessaly
- Koryfi, Elis, in the Elis regional unit, Western Greece
- Koryfi, Florina, settlement in the Florina regional unit, Western Macedonia
