= Pengenjek =

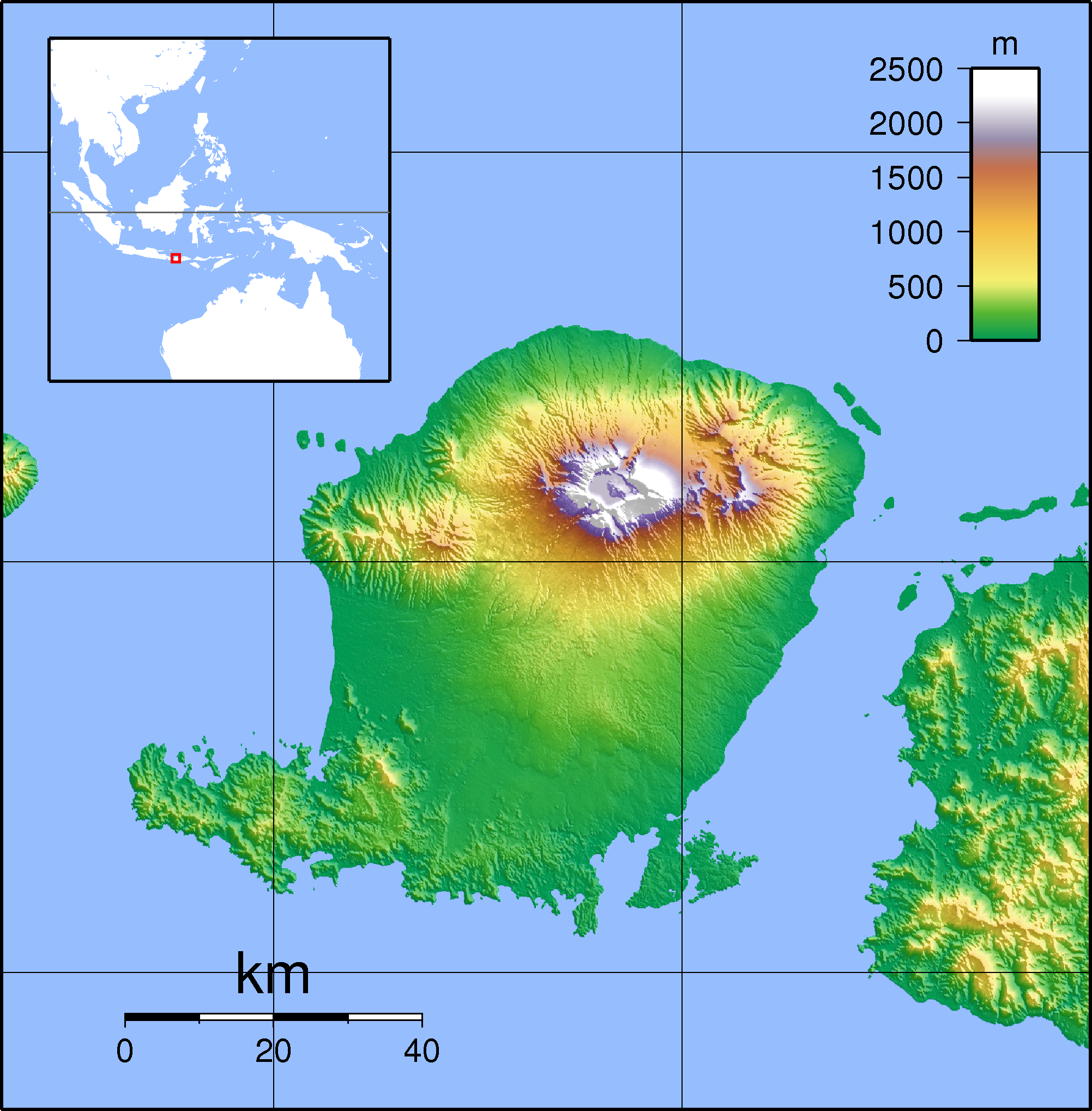
- Location in Indonesia Pengenjek (Indonesia)
- Country: Indonesia
- Region: Lesser Sunda Islands
- Province: West Nusa Tenggara
- Regency: Central Lombok
- Time zone: UTC+08

Pengenjek is a village situated in Lombok Tengah regency of Nusa Tenggara Barat Province, Indonesia, located at the heart of the island of Lombok. The island is inhabited by the Sasak people. Industries here are farming, fishing, blacksmithing, traditional roof crafting, trading and building. There are also historical places:

- 1. Abangan, is a tunnel or conduit made by Dutch in colonial era.
- 2. Montong Praja, is a place where the king of Bonjeruk kingdom used to begin his royal parade to greet the people.

There is also a sacred place Kale kubur beto, the sacred place where the ancient believe the place for Wali or the pious to meditate.
