= Koti =

Koti may refer to:

== Places ==
- Koti, Armenia
- Koti Department, Burkina Faso, and its capital Koti, Burkina Faso
- Koti, Hyderabad, India
- Koti, Novo Mesto, Slovenia
- Koti Island, Mozambique
- Koti (princely state), now part of Solan district, Himachal Pradesh, India
- Koti, Himachal, a station on Kalka-Shimla UNESCO World Heritage mountain railway of India

== People ==
- Koti (gender), or kothi, an effeminate man in the culture of the Indian subcontinent
- Koti (composer) (Saluri Koteswara Rao, fl. from 1983), a composer in the Indian film industry
- Koti and Chennayya (c. 1556–1591), legendary Tuluva twin heroes in the Tulu epic of the same name

== Other uses ==
- Koti (clothing), a South Asian jacket worn by women
- Koti (number), or crore, denoting 10 million (100 lakh) in the Indian numbering system
- Koti (ship), an oil tanker seized by South Korea in 2017
- Koti (film), a 1995 Finnish drama
- Koti language, spoken on Koti Island in Mozambique
- KOTI (TV), an American TV station licensed to Klamath Falls, Oregon
- The Korea Transport Institute, a South Korean think tank
- Kirkuk Oil Training Institute, of the Ministry of Oil (Iraq)
- Koti-jyā, a trigonometric function in Indian mathematics

== See also ==
- Kothi (disambiguation)
- Kota (disambiguation)
- Kōchi Prefecture, Japan
