= Simos Ioannidis =

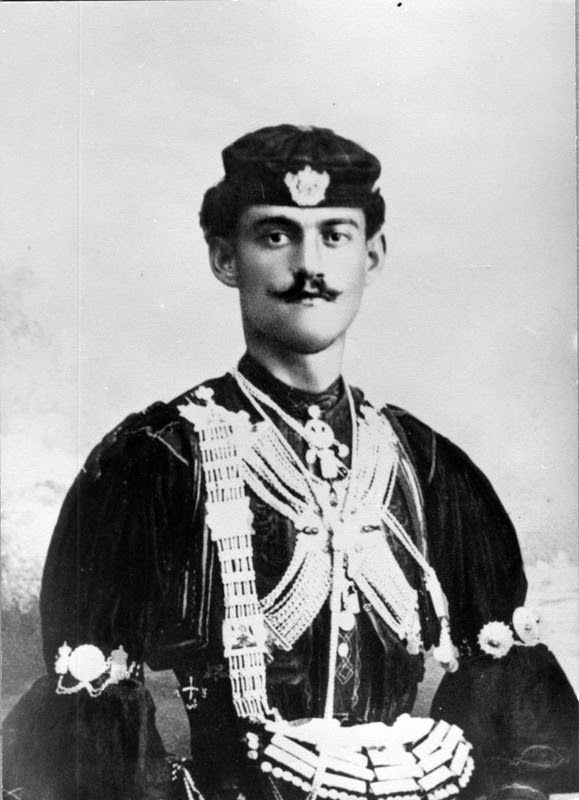
- A photograph of Simos Ioannidis c. 1904-1908
- Native name: Σίμος Στογιάννου Ιωαννίδης
- Nicknames: Armenskiotis; Αρμενσκιώτης
- Born: c. 1880s Armenskon, Monastir Vilayet, Ottoman Empire (now Alona, Greece)
- Allegiance: Kingdom of Greece
- Branch: Hellenic Army
- Conflicts: Macedonian Struggle; Ilinden Uprising; Balkan Wars; First Balkan War; Second Balkan War

Simos Stogiannou Ioannidis (Greek: Σίμος Στογιάννου Ιωαννίδης) was a Slavophone Greek revolutionary of the Macedonian Struggle known as well by the nom de guerre Armenskiotis.

== Biography ==
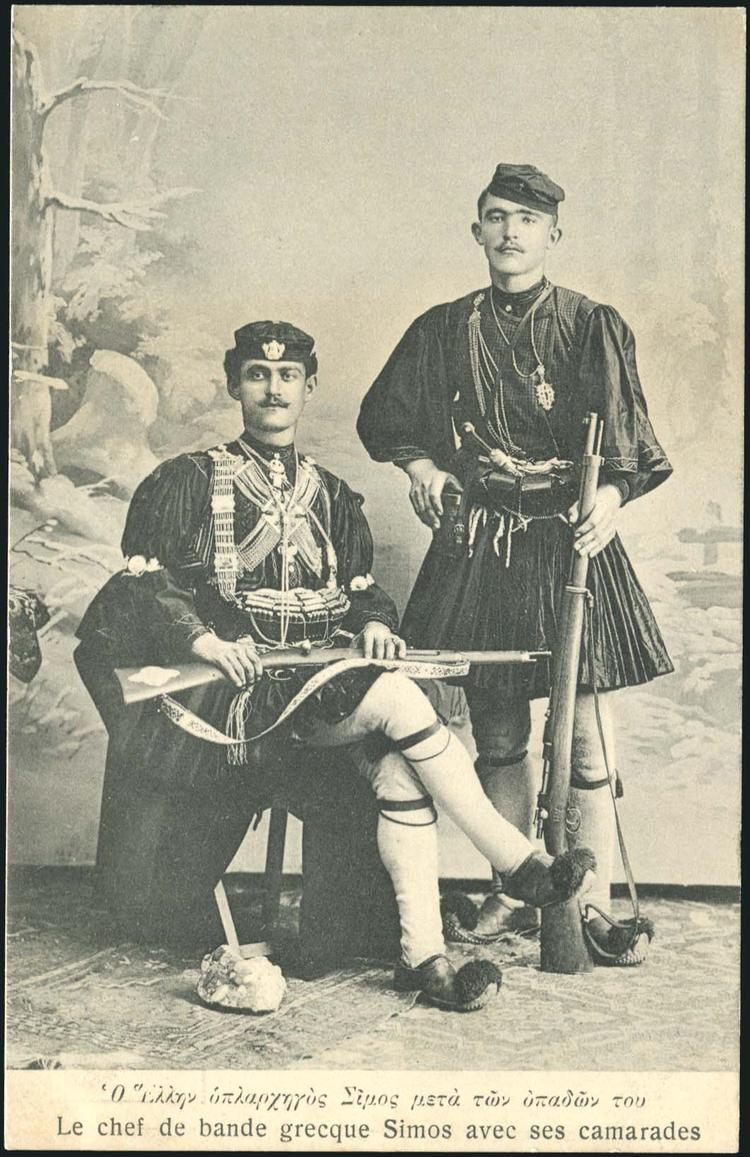
Ioannidis and fellow Makedonomachos during the Macedonian Struggle.

Ioannidis was born in the 1880s in Armenskon of Florina, then Ottoman Empire (now Alona, Greece). He started his armed actions by joining the armed group of Kottas as his adjutant and participating in the Ilinden–Preobrazhenie Uprising. He later joined the group of Pavlos Melas, assisting him and other chieftains like Efthymios Kaoudis and Georgios Tsontos who did not know the region well, acting in the region of Pelister. He set up his own armed group in 1906 cooperating with Pavlos Rakovitis, acting in the region of Florina.

He participated as a volunteer in both Balkan Wars, and notably in the battle which led to the extermination of Vasil Chekalarov.

In 1957, the village of Motesnica in Florina was renamed to Simos Ioannidis in his honour.
