= Kuta (surname) =

Kuta is a surname and may be:

- Ibrahim Kuta (1942–2008), a Nigerian politician
- Dahiru Awaisu Kuta (1949–2014), a Nigerian politician
- Charles Kuta (born 1956), an American computer engineer
- Stephen Robert Kuta (born 11 June 1978), a British author and historian

== See also ==
- Kutas (surname)
