= Kōta =

Kōta may refer to:

- Kōta, Aichi, a town in Nukata District, Aichi Prefecture, Japan
- Kōta (given name), a masculine Japanese given name
