= Pujut District =

District in Central Lombok Regency, West Nusa Tenggara, Indonesia

Pujut
- District
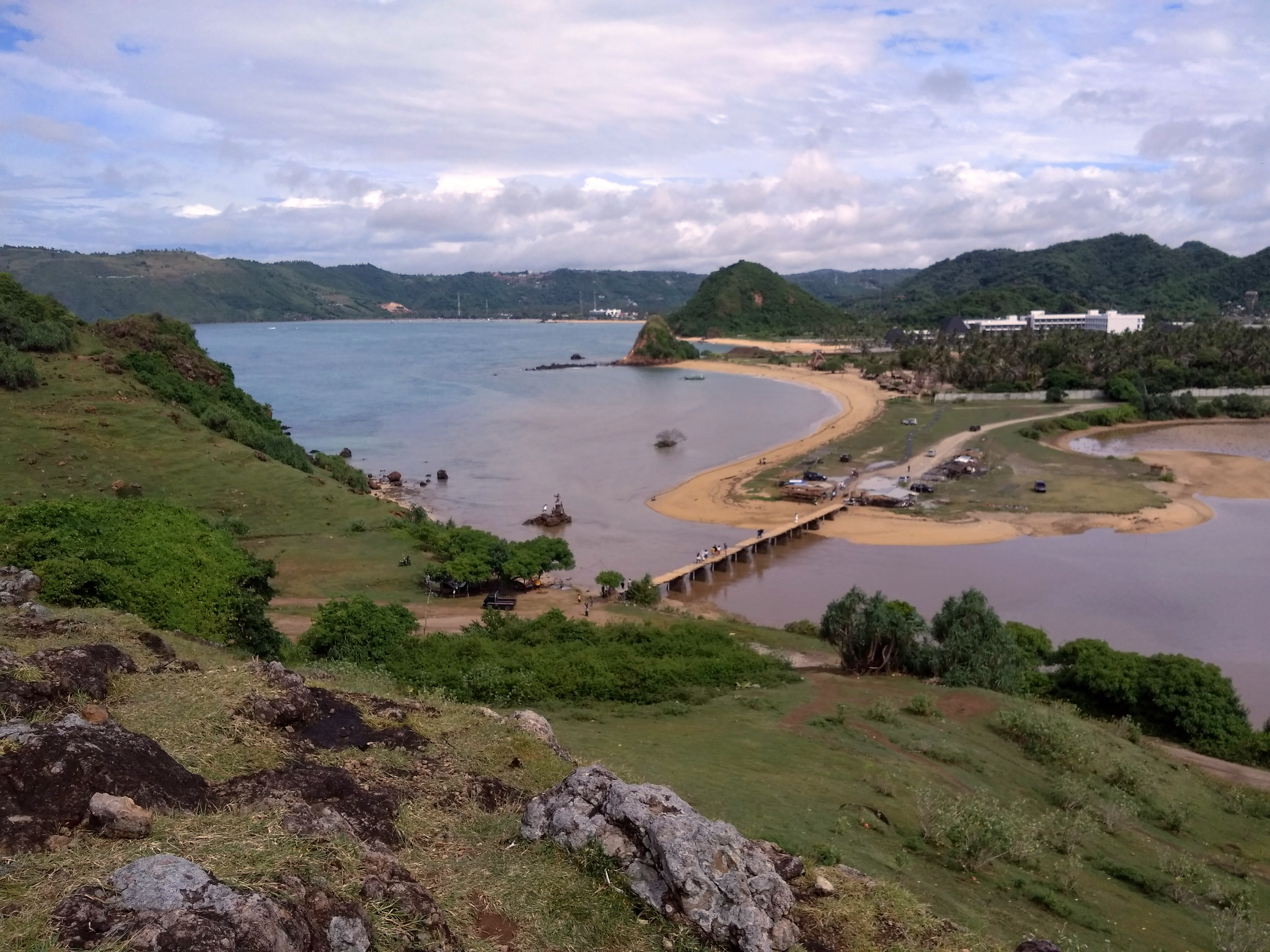
- Merese Hill in Kuta, on the southern coast of Pujut District

- Location within Lesser Sunda Islands Location within Indonesia
- Coordinates: 08°51′18″S 116°18′45″E
- Country: Indonesia
- Province: West Nusa Tenggara
- Regency: Central Lombok

Area
  - Total: 238.12 km^{2} (91.94 sq mi)
- Elevation: 113 m (371 ft)

Population (mid 2025 estimate)
  - Total: 131,617
  - Density: 552.73/km^{2} (1,431.6/sq mi)
- Time zone: UTC+8 (WITA)
- Ministry of Home Affairs Code: 52.02.04

Pujut is a district of Central Lombok Regency, West Nusa Tenggara, Indonesia. Its administrative center is in the village of Sengkol. It borders Central Praya District to the north, East Praya District to the east, the Indian Ocean to the south, and the West Praya District to the west. In the year 2025, there were 131,617inhabitants within the district.

== Geography ==
Pujut is located in the south-central part of Lombok Island. Its average elevation is at 113 metres above sea level.

== Climate ==
Pujut has a Tropical Savanna Climate (Aw). On average, the most rainfall occurs in the month of January, with 348 mm of precipitation; and the least rainfall occurs in the month of August, with 14 mm of precipitation.

Climate data for Pujut
Month	Jan	Feb	Mar	Apr	May	Jun	Jul	Aug	Sep	Oct	Nov	Dec	Year
Mean daily maximum °C (°F)	28.8 (83.8)	28.9 (84.0)	29.2 (84.6)	29.4 (84.9)	29.4 (84.9)	29 (84)	28.8 (83.8)	29.3 (84.7)	30.1 (86.2)	30.8 (87.4)	30.4 (86.7)	29.2 (84.6)	29.4 (85.0)
Daily mean °C (°F)	26 (79)	26 (79)	26.1 (79.0)	26.2 (79.2)	26.1 (79.0)	25.5 (77.9)	24.9 (76.8)	24.9 (76.8)	25.7 (78.3)	26.6 (79.9)	26.8 (80.2)	26.3 (79.3)	25.9 (78.7)
Mean daily minimum °C (°F)	24.1 (75.4)	24.1 (75.4)	24.1 (75.4)	24 (75)	23.5 (74.3)	22.8 (73.0)	22.1 (71.8)	21.9 (71.4)	22.5 (72.5)	23.6 (74.5)	24.4 (75.9)	24.4 (75.9)	23.5 (74.2)
Average rainfall mm (inches)	348 (13.7)	292 (11.5)	310 (12.2)	227 (8.9)	80 (3.1)	47 (1.9)	30 (1.2)	14 (0.6)	33 (1.3)	84 (3.3)	229 (9.0)	342 (13.5)	2,036 (80.2)
Source: Climate-Data.org
