= Lighthouse Winmore =

Lighthouse Winmore is a Hong Kong-registered oil tanker that in November 2017, was seized for suspected violations of United Nations sanctions against North Korea.

== See also ==
- Koti
