= Kouta =

Kouta may refer to:

- Katsutaro Kouta (1904–1974), Japanese singer
- Kouta (music), a genre of shamisen music
- Anthony Koutoufides, Australian rules footballer

== See also ==
- Kota (disambiguation)
- Kuta (disambiguation)
