= Kotha =

Kotha may refer to several places:

- Kotha, Jalandhar, Punjab, India
- Kotha, Khyber Pakhtunkhwa, Pakistan
- Kotha, Punjab, India
- In India kotha, from Hindi, also refers to a brothel, see prostitution in India; the literal meaning is rooftop and is still used for the same especially in and around Lucknow, since tawaifs (courtesans) used to practice music and dance on the balcony/rooftop (kotha) this word became a type of synonym to a brothel

== See also ==
- Kota (disambiguation)
- Kothi (disambiguation)
- Kothari (disambiguation)
- Kothha, a 2023 Indian Bengali-language romantic drama television series
- King of Kotha, 2023 Indian film by Abhilash Joshiy
