= Kutasi =

Kutasi is a surname. Notable people with the surname include:

- György Kutasi (1910–1977), Hungarian water polo player
- Lajos Kutasi (1915–?), Hungarian field handball player
- Róbert Kutasi (died 2012), former chairman of Rákospalotai EAC

== See also ==
- Kutas (surname)
