= Simos Ioannidis, Florina =

Simos Ioannidis
- Community
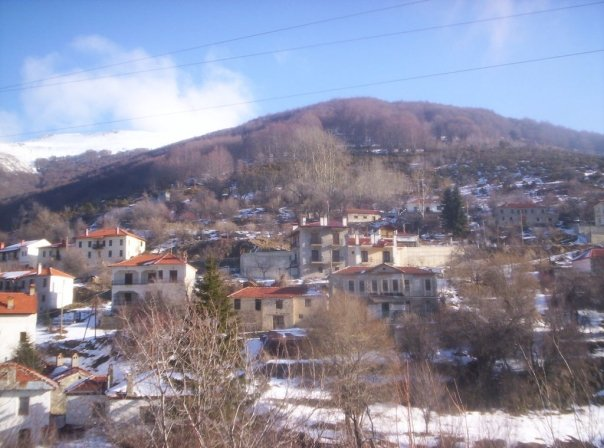
- Village of Simos Ioannidis

- Location within Greece
- Coordinates: 40°46′43″N 21°21′29″E
- Country: Greece
- Geographic region: Macedonia
- Administrative region: Western Macedonia
- Regional unit: Florina
- Municipality: Florina
- Municipal unit: Florina
- Community: Simos Ioannidis

Population (2021)
  - Community: 211
- Time zone: UTC+2 (EET)
  - Summer (DST): UTC+3 (EEST)

Simos Ioannidis (Greek: Σίμος Ιωαννίδης, before 1957: Μοτεσνίτσα – Motesnitsa) is a village in Florina Regional Unit, Macedonia, Greece. The community consists of the villages Simos Ioannidis, Koryfi and Trivouno.

In 1957, the village was renamed after Simos Ioannidis, a Greek revolutionary active during the Macedonian Struggle.
