= Praya, Lombok =

Praya
- Town
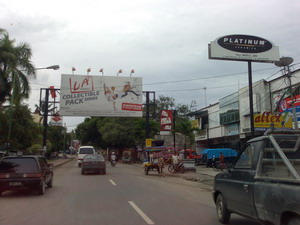
- Praya, Lombok

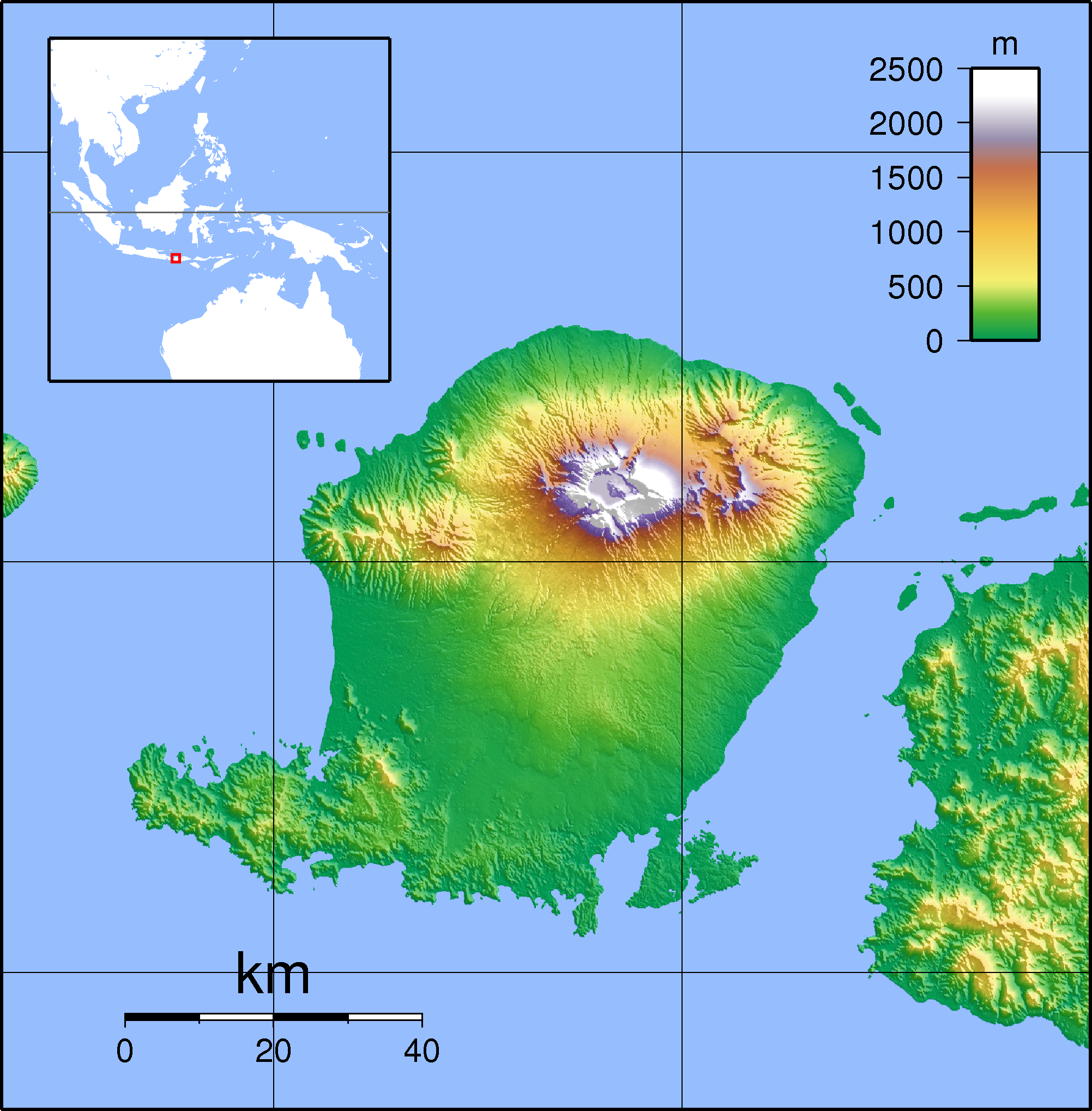
- Location in Indonesia Praya (Indonesia)
- Coordinates: 8°42′28″S 116°16′23″E
- Country: Indonesia
- Region: Lesser Sunda Islands
- Province: West Nusa Tenggara
- Regency: Central Lombok
- Kecamatan: Praya

Area
  - Total: 51.08 km^{2} (19.72 sq mi)

Population (mid 2025 estimate)
  - Total: 139,015
  - Density: 2,722/km^{2} (7,049/sq mi)
- Time zone: UTC+08

Praya (Indonesian: Praya or Kecamatan Praya) is a large town which serves as the capital of Central Lombok Regency (Indonesian: Kabupaten Lombok Tengah) on Lombok Island in the province of West Nusa Tenggara, Indonesia. It has an area of 51.08 square kilometres (19.72 sq mi) and had a population of 125,889 people at the 2020 Census; the official estimate as at mid 2025 was 139,015. It is a predominantly Muslim town, with minorities of Balinese inhabitants following Hinduism and Chinese inhabitants following Buddhism or Christianity.

== Transportation ==
It is located a short distance to the north of the Bandara Internasional Lombok airport (IATA: LOP, ICAO: WADL), which opened on 1 October 2011. The airport is the island's only operational airport and provides services for both international and domestic operations. It is also the only international airport serving the province of West Nusa Tenggara.

== Climate ==
Praya has a tropical savanna climate (Köppen Aw) with moderate to little rainfall from May to October and heavy rainfall from November to April.

Climate data for Praya
| Month | Jan | Feb | Mar | Apr | May | Jun | Jul | Aug | Sep | Oct | Nov | Dec | Year |
|---|---|---|---|---|---|---|---|---|---|---|---|---|---|
| Mean daily maximum °C (°F) | 29.9 (85.8) | 30.0 (86.0) | 30.2 (86.4) | 30.8 (87.4) | 30.4 (86.7) | 29.7 (85.5) | 29.2 (84.6) | 29.7 (85.5) | 30.3 (86.5) | 30.7 (87.3) | 30.6 (87.1) | 30.4 (86.7) | 30.2 (86.3) |
| Daily mean °C (°F) | 26.0 (78.8) | 26.1 (79.0) | 26.0 (78.8) | 26.0 (78.8) | 25.4 (77.7) | 24.5 (76.1) | 24.0 (75.2) | 24.4 (75.9) | 25.3 (77.5) | 25.9 (78.6) | 26.3 (79.3) | 26.3 (79.3) | 25.5 (77.9) |
| Mean daily minimum °C (°F) | 22.2 (72.0) | 22.3 (72.1) | 21.9 (71.4) | 21.2 (70.2) | 20.5 (68.9) | 19.4 (66.9) | 18.9 (66.0) | 19.2 (66.6) | 20.3 (68.5) | 21.1 (70.0) | 22.0 (71.6) | 22.2 (72.0) | 20.9 (69.7) |
| Average rainfall mm (inches) | 286 (11.3) | 269 (10.6) | 198 (7.8) | 160 (6.3) | 118 (4.6) | 79 (3.1) | 73 (2.9) | 31 (1.2) | 13 (0.5) | 80 (3.1) | 185 (7.3) | 307 (12.1) | 1,799 (70.8) |
Source: Climate-Data.org
