= Captain Kottas Museum =

- Μουσείο Μακεδονικού Αγώνα Καπετάν Κώττα
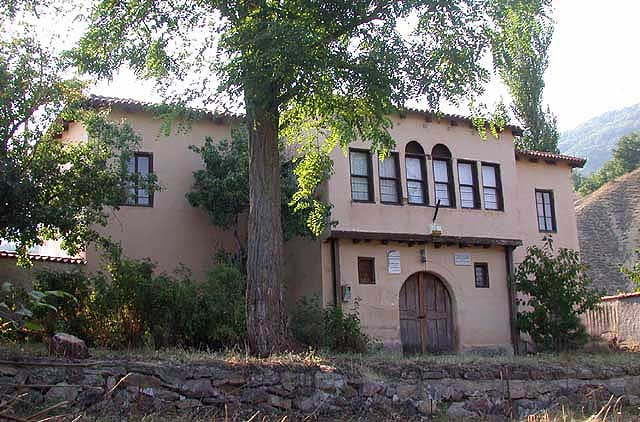
- External view of Kottas Museum
- Established: 1995
- Location: Kotas, Macedonia, Greece
- Coordinates: 40.72078014846943°N 21.172793888629762°E
- Type: Military museum

The Captain Kottas Museum or Museum of the Macedonian Struggle of Captain Kottas (Greek: Μουσείο Μακεδονικού Αγώνα Καπετάν Κώττα) is located in the village of Kotas, Macedonia, Greece, the birthplace of Konstantinos Christou (Kottas), one of the earliest Greek figures of the Macedonian Struggle.

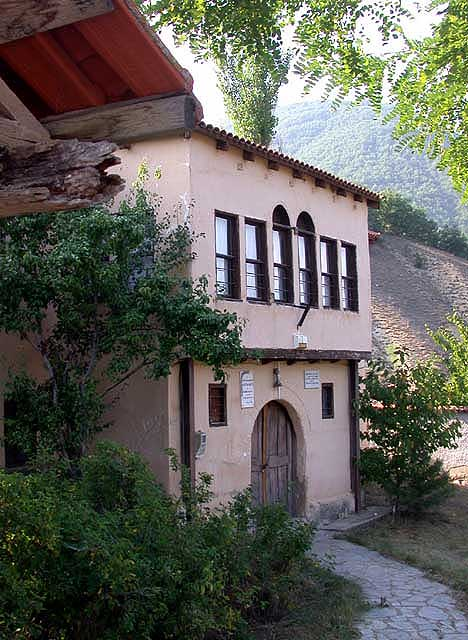
Museum entrance

== History ==
The museum is located in the former home and birthplace of Konstantinos Christou (Kottas). Kottas was originally the leader of an independent armed group acting against the Ottomans and Albanians before becoming a Komitadji of the Internal Macedonian Revolutionary Organization. He later deserted the IMRO and entered the service of the Hellenic Macedonian Committee, fighting the Bulgarians in collaboration with the metropolitan of Kastoria Germanos Karavangelis. He was eventually captured and hanged by the Ottomans in 1905. His successes in Greek service and subsequent execution gained significant attention and, along with the death of Pavlos Melas, led to the intensification of Greek efforts in the region.

The Ministry of Macedonia and Thrace made provision for the Kottas family home to be converted into a museum, and it was opened by the then President of Greece late in 1995. It operates with the help of the "Friends of the Museum of the Macedonian Struggle society" and co-operating women's societies.

== Museum ==
It is located at a distance of 45 km from Florina off the National Road.

On the ground floor there is a display of three complete outfits belonging to the Christou family, as well as a few domestic utensils and tools. Two firearms dating from the time of the Macedonian Struggle are exhibited on the first floor, and photographs of Makedonomachoi from the Florina area.
