= Kothi =

Kothi may refer to:

== Places ==
- Kothi, Hyderabad, Andhra Pradesh, India
- Kothi, Satna, Madhya Pradesh, India. Historically, Kothi was the capital of the erstwhile Kothi State, founded by Baghel Rajput ruler Raja Bahadur Jagat Rai Singh Baghel in 1650.
- Kothi State, a former Baghel Rajput princely state in the modern Satna district, Madhya Pradesh. Historically, Kothi was the capital of the erstwhile Kothi State, founded by Baghel Rajput ruler Raja Bahadur Jagat Rai Singh Baghel in 1650.

== Other uses ==
- Kothi (gender), an effeminate man in the culture of the Indian subcontinent

== See also ==
- Koti (disambiguation)
- Kotha (disambiguation)
