= Trivouno =

- Settlement
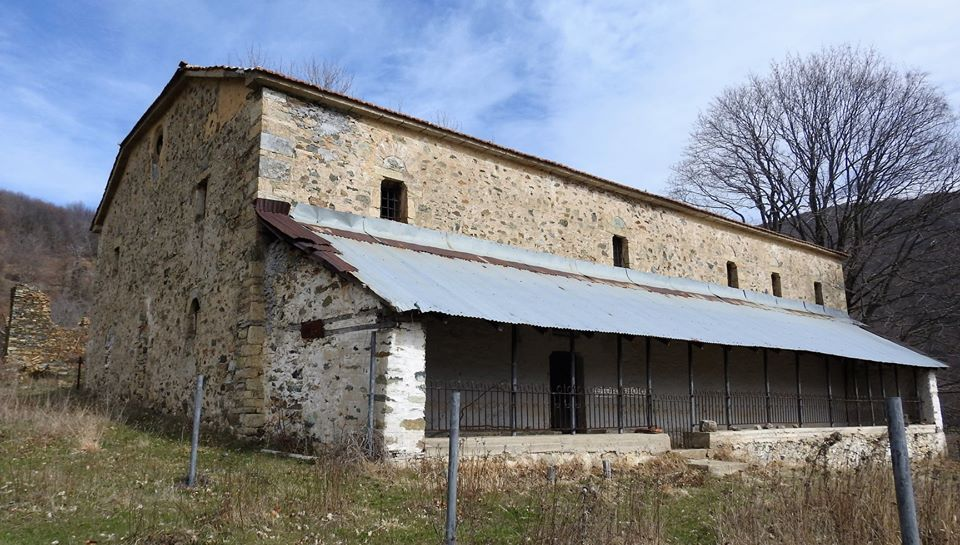
- Village church

- Location within Greece
- Coordinates: 40°44′25″N 21°17′55″E
- Country: Greece
- Administrative region: Western Macedonia
- Regional unit: Florina
- Municipality: Florina
- Municipal unit: Florina
- Community: Simos Ioannidis
- Time zone: UTC+2 (EET)
  - Summer (DST): UTC+3 (EEST)

Trivouno (Greek: Τρίβουνο, before 1927: Τύρσια – Tyrsia; Bulgarian: Търсие, Tarsie; Macedonian: Трсје, Trsje) was a village in Florina Regional Unit, Western Macedonia, Greece. Situated at an altitude of 1,156 m (3,793 ft), the abandoned village is located 15 kilometres south–west from Florina. Trivouno was located in the Korestia area and situated in mountainous terrain. It was part of the community of Simos Ioannidis.

== History ==
Tyrsia was a Slavic–Macedonian village. The inhabitants were Christian and belonged to the Bulgarian Exarchate. Due to its mountainous location, Tyrsia experienced poverty and gurbet (economic migration). In the 19th century, the first village school was established by Father Gerasim, an Exarchist priest. Following the Ilinden Uprising (1903), economic migration from the village changed toward a transatlantic direction and over time its population of youth decreased. Immigrants from Tyrsia in Toronto, Canada participated in the early Bulgarian community to build church infrastructure. The village population numbered 900 in 1912.

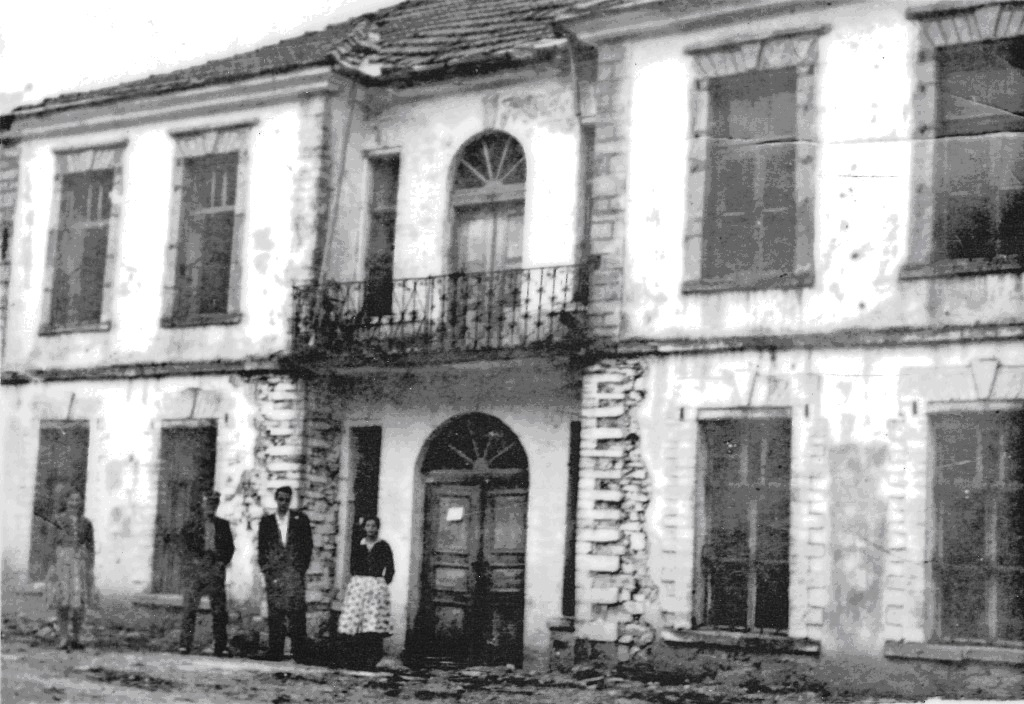
Village school, 1866

War and new borders severed the wider area from the economic centres of Bitola and Korçë, leaving only Thessaloniki. Tyrsia had some pro–Bulgarian supporters and the Greek state viewed the village with suspicion. People from Tyrsia fought in Greco-Turkish War (1919–1922) in Anatolia and in Albania. The village population numbered 650 in 1928 and 629 in 1940. Reliant on agricultural activities and some remittances from immigrants abroad, the average yearly family income of the village in the late interwar period was 10,700 drachmas.

In World War Two, Trivouno was on the borderline of the Italian and German occupation zones in Greece. The first guerrilla fighters in the village originated from the Bitola area. During 1943, the National Liberation Front (EAM), a Greek resistance organisation controlled Trivouno and by mid–1944, they recognised a Slavic–Macedonian presence. Throughout the conflict, inhabitants experienced difficult living circumstances, a black market economy formed and Italian troops stole local poultry. Community tensions emerged as some villagers supported either the Bulgarian or Greek–Monarchist causes. The village was a centre for Komitadjis and the majority of its inhabitants were pro–Bulgarian. A recruitment drive promising Macedonian autonomy by Yugoslav partisans in the area resulted in 8 villagers joining their movement in early 1944.

In the Greek Civil War, the village was occupied by the Democratic Army of Greece (DAG). Many people joined DAG during the civil war and in mid–1947, Greek government forces razed Trivouno. Villagers became dispersed, while 115 children were evacuated to Yugoslavia and other Eastern Bloc countries with some family reunions occurring 20 years later. The defeat of DAG made many inhabitants go into exile, either to Yugoslav Macedonia or Soviet Uzbekistan. Several villagers were arrested by the Greek government and given either long or life prison sentences and others the death penalty for assisting communist forces. In 1951, Trivouno had 284 people.

Difficult economic circumstances made the remaining population immigrate to either Canada or Australia and settle among earlier migrants from the village who left in the 1930s. Trivouno had 229 inhabitants in 1961. For reasons of development and security, the Greek government during the late 1960s forcibly relocated the remaining inhabitants to the neighbourhoods of Florina. The Greek census of 1991 recorded 2 people in Trivouno.
