= Alona, Greece =

Alona Άλωνα, Арменско
- Community
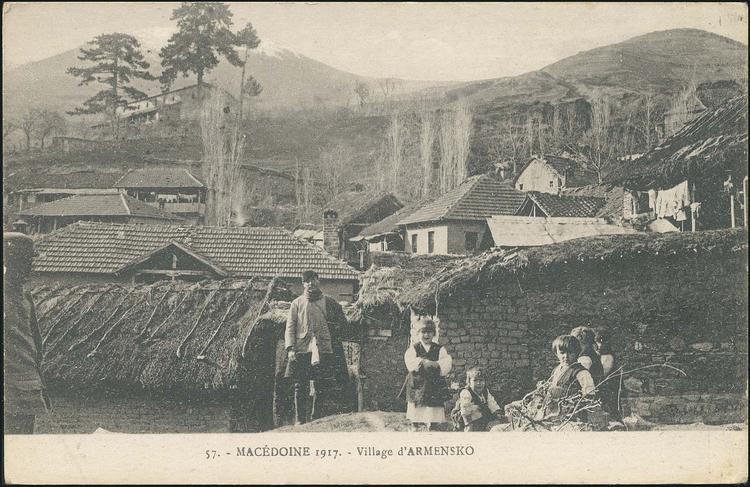
- Alona, then Armenskon in 1917

- Location within Greece
- Coordinates: 40°46′37″N 21°18′10″E
- Country: Greece
- Administrative region: West Macedonia
- Regional unit: Florina
- Municipality: Florina
- Municipal unit: Florina
- Elevation: 1,000 m (3,300 ft)

Population (2021)
  - Community: 164
- Time zone: UTC+2 (EET)
  - Summer (DST): UTC+3 (EEST)
- Vehicle registration: ΡΑ

Alona (Greek: Άλωνα, before 1927: Αρμένσκον – Armenskon; Bulgarian & Macedonian: Арменско) is a mountainous village in the region of Florina, northern Greece. It is located on the slope of mountain Pelister, in an average height of 1,000 metres (3,300 ft). According to the 2021 Greek census, it had 164 inhabitants.

== History ==
The village was founded by Armenians, spoon masters. In the Ottoman tax registers of the non-Muslim population from 1626 to 1627, the village was recorded under the name Ermencheva with 53 Christian households. In 1848, the Russian Slavist Victor Grigorovich described the village as Bulgarian. Even until 1940, according to the EAM member Pavlos Koufis, the inhabitants of the village continued to be predominantly Slavophone, with the exception of some Grecophone Sarakatsani families.

Some people of the village took part in the Ilinden Uprising in 1903, which resulted in major catastrophes to the village and several of its inhabitants were slaughtered by the Ottoman forces during a battle with komitadjis near the village. Many inhabitants of the village also participated in the Macedonian Struggle, either siding with IMRO either with the Macedonian Committee. In September 1905, approximately 20 Macedonian fighters led by chieftains Pavlos Kyrou and Stefanos Grigoriou entered the village, killing 2 armed men who were assosicated with IMRO.

In 1940 Alona had 991 inhabitants who 2/3 had partial or non-Greek self-identification. During the Axis occupation of Greece a group of the inhabitants of the village assisted Bulgaria. Later, 7 of the inhabitants of the village were executed by the Germans, of which 3 were accused of being andarts of ELAS.

According to some estimates, during the Greek Civil War, more than 150 locals were conscripted into the Democratic Army of Greece. Of which, 57 or 61 were killed during combat operations, executed or died in prison or exile, while one was killed fighting alongside government forces. With the end of the Civil War, the defeated rebels fled to the socialist countries, and in the following decades there was a wave of immigration to the United States, Australia and Canada, resulting in the dramatical decrease of the permanent population of the village. In Toronto, Canada there are 285 families from Alona.

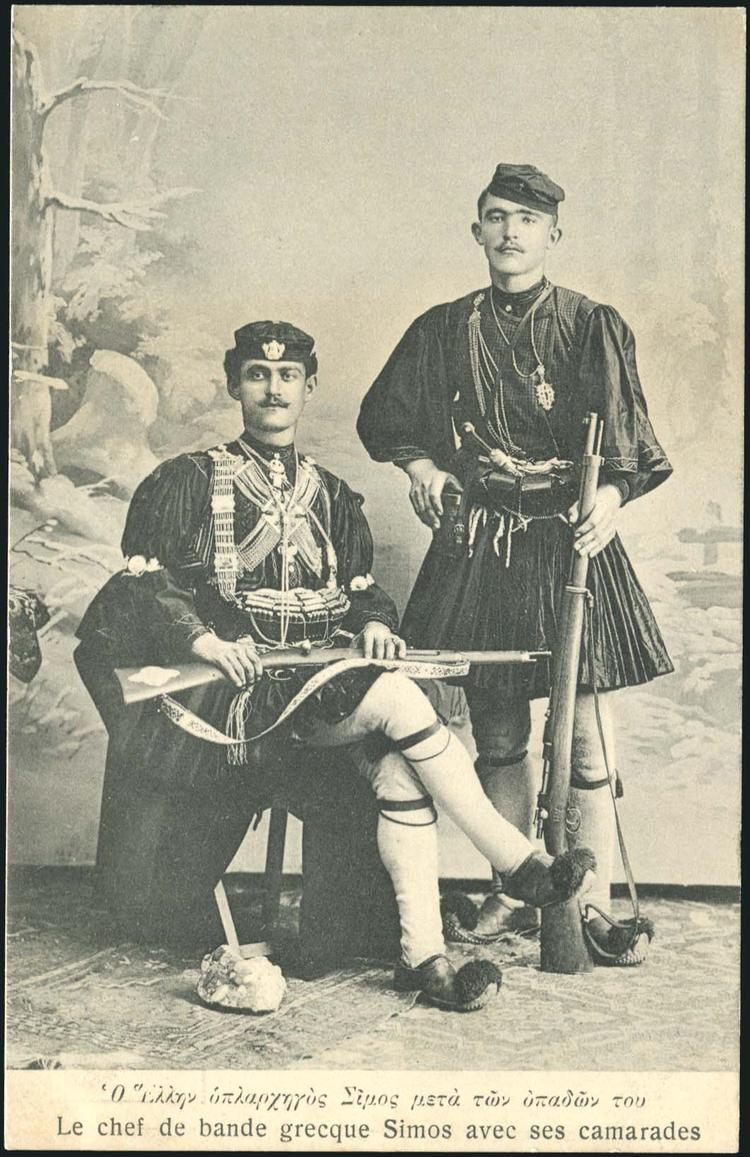
The chieftain of the Macedonian Struggle Simos Ioannidis who was born in the village (sitting)

== Personalities ==
People of the Hellenic Macedonian Committee like chieftain Simos Ioannidis and Makedonomachoi such as Petros Alexiou, Petros Stoikou, Spyridon Tasis and Konstantinos Temelkou were born in Alona or then known as Armenskon. The Bulgarian komitadjis Ivan Gochev Kulinov and Anastas Iliev were born in the village as well. The author and soldier of the Greek Resistance Pavlos Koufis (1913–2003) was from Alona too.

== Culture ==
The traditional costume of the Alonians was the inspiration for the uniform of the Makedonomachoi, which today is the official uniform of the Evzones in Syntagma Square of Athens. The settlement bearts its name to the traditional dance of Aloniotikos or known as well as Armetskoto.
