= Kotas, Florina =

Kotas
- Community
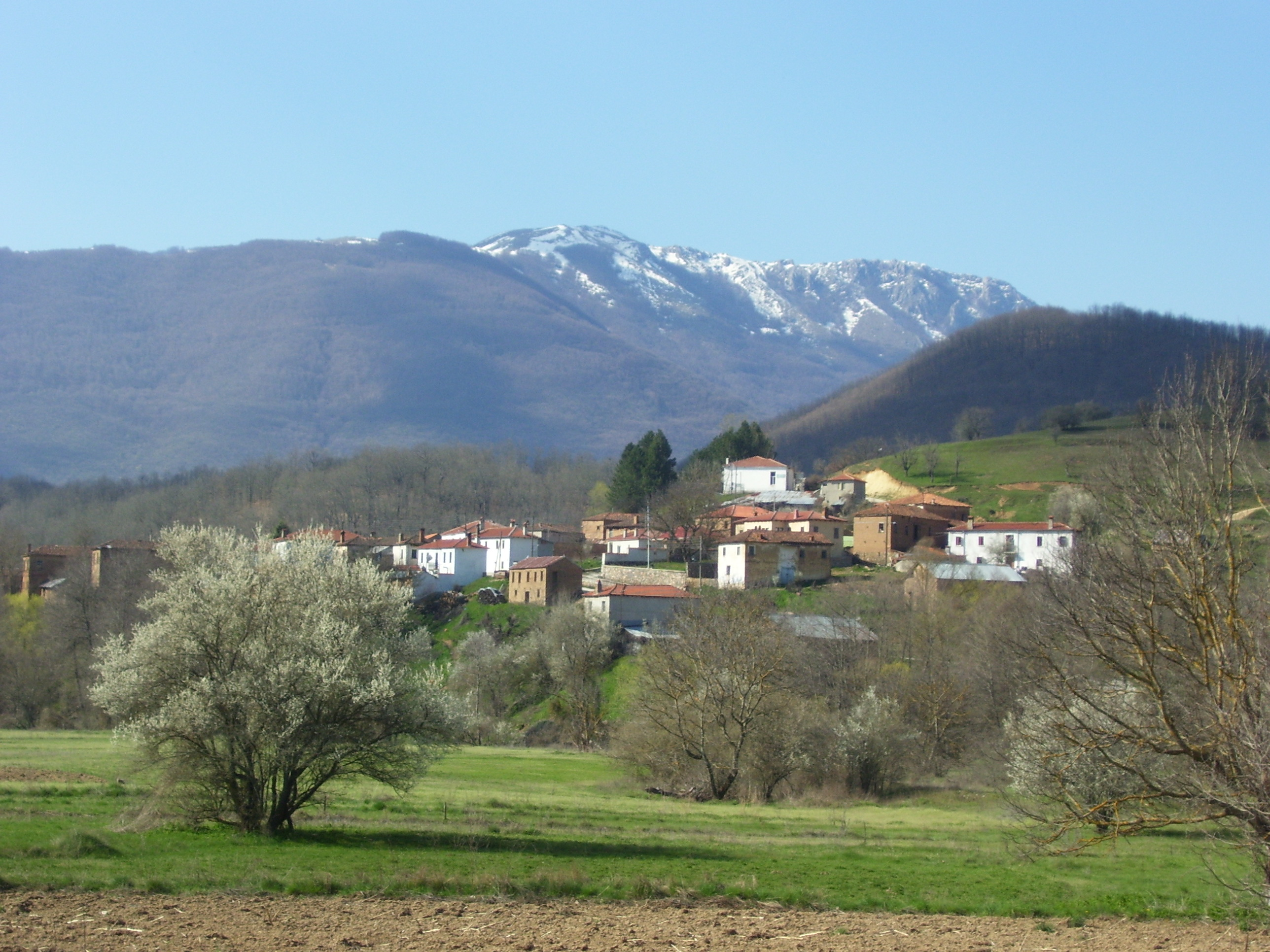

- Location within Greece
- Coordinates: 40°41′36″N 21°10′14″E
- Country: Greece
- Administrative region: Western Macedonia
- Regional unit: Florina
- Municipality: Prespes
- Municipal unit: Prespes
- Community: Kotas

Population (2021)
  - Community: 24
- Time zone: UTC+2 (EET)
  - Summer (DST): UTC+3 (EEST)

Kotas (Greek: Κώτας, before 1927: Ρούλια – Roulia, between 1927 and 1932: Κατωχώρι – Katochori; Bulgarian: Руля, Rulya; Macedonian: Рулја, Rulja) is a community and village in Florina Regional Unit, Western Macedonia, Greece. The village has an altitude of 890 m (2,920 ft).

Kotas is located south–west from Florina on a road to Albania in the Korestia area and situated in mountainous terrain. The total land area of the village Kotas is 1,593 hectares, with a majority as forest, followed by use for agriculture and a small remainder as grasslands. The village was renamed after Kottas Christou, a Greek Makedonomachos active during the Macedonian Struggle. His former house in the village is the Captain Kottas Museum dedicated in his honour.

A Christian village, Roulia belonged to the Patriarchate and following the Ilinden Uprising (1903) most of the inhabitants belonged to the Bulgarian Exarchate. In statistics gathered by Vasil Kanchov in 1900, Roulia was populated by 500 Christian Bulgarians. According to villagers of the 2010s, the inhabitants in this period had a Greek national consciousness. Kottas Christou, a native of the village became its muhtar (a leading notable) in 1896. Christou led an armed group from 1898 onward which fought the Muslim beys in the Korestia region, while his allegiances shifted from pro–Bulgarian to pro–Greek.

An attack by the Ottoman army on Roulia in 1902 was resisted by Christou, later Ottoman reinforcements made him flee and the inhabitants leave, while the village was looted. In June 1904, Ottoman forces surrounded Roulia and after a search of the village arrested Christou and later hanged him in 1905 at Monastir (modern Bitola). The population numbered 550 in 1912, 504 in 1920 and 491 in 1928.

In the late interwar period, the fields of the village were of poor quality and situated on nearby mountainous terrain with a few having access to irrigation. In Kotas some 630 villagers (80 families) had 400 hectares for cultivation and half of the land each year was left fallow. Crops grown were corn, wheat, rye, beans and potatoes. Reliant on earnings based on agricultural activities and harvests, animal husbandry, some remittances from immigrants abroad and veteran's war pensions, the average yearly family income of the village was 15,100 drachmas. Among the Slavic Macedonian population, a few folkloric traditions of the village differed from the shared culture of the wider region.

The population of Kotas was 586 in 1940. In the Greek Civil War, the village was occupied by the Democratic Army of Greece (DSE). Kotas was part of a logistics supply route and a hub from Albania used by DSE during the civil war. Charles Schermerhorn, a UN social worker present in the region during the civil war stated the village politically orientated to the left. He described the situation for the youth in Kotas as "very bad". Of the 278 children aged 14 and under in early 1947, most had been evacuated by the guerillas in spring 1948 and 45 remained. Parents of the removed children wanted them returned. William H. McNeill, a US army representative also present in the region stated Kotas was a Slavophone village, conditions were dire and corroborated the information provided by Schermerhorn of the missing children. The population of Kotas, a Slavic Macedonian village was reduced by 63 percent due to the impacts of the Second World War and the civil war. Nearly two thirds of the remaining villagers were female.

The population of Kotas was 218 in 1951, 182 in 1961, and 59 in 1981. Pre–war and post–war immigration from Kotas led to the formation of a diaspora and most of the village population lives abroad in the northern suburbs of Melbourne in Australia. The modern village economy is based on lumbering and livestock. Kotas had 22 inhabitants in 2011. The village population is small and in decline. It is composed mainly of retirees. In the late 2010s, the elderly of the village speak the Gorna Koreshcha variant of the Kostur dialect, while the youth have no knowledge of it. Several exiled villagers from the civil war and their descendants who live in Bitola, North Macedonia return to the village to visit relatives.
