= Koryfi, Kozani =

Koryfi Κορυφή
- Community
- Location within Greece
- Coordinates: 40°11′35″N 21°13′55″E
- Country: Greece
- Administrative region: Western Macedonia
- Regional unit: Kozani
- Municipality: Voio
- Municipal unit: Tsotyli

Population (2021)
  - Community: 65
- Time zone: UTC+2 (EET)
  - Summer (DST): UTC+3 (EEST)

Koryfi (Greek: Κορυφή, before 1927: Μπόρσα – Borsa), is a community located in the Tsotyli municipal unit of the municipality of Voio, situated in Kozani regional unit, in the Greek region of Western Macedonia.
