= Kuta, Lombok =

- Village
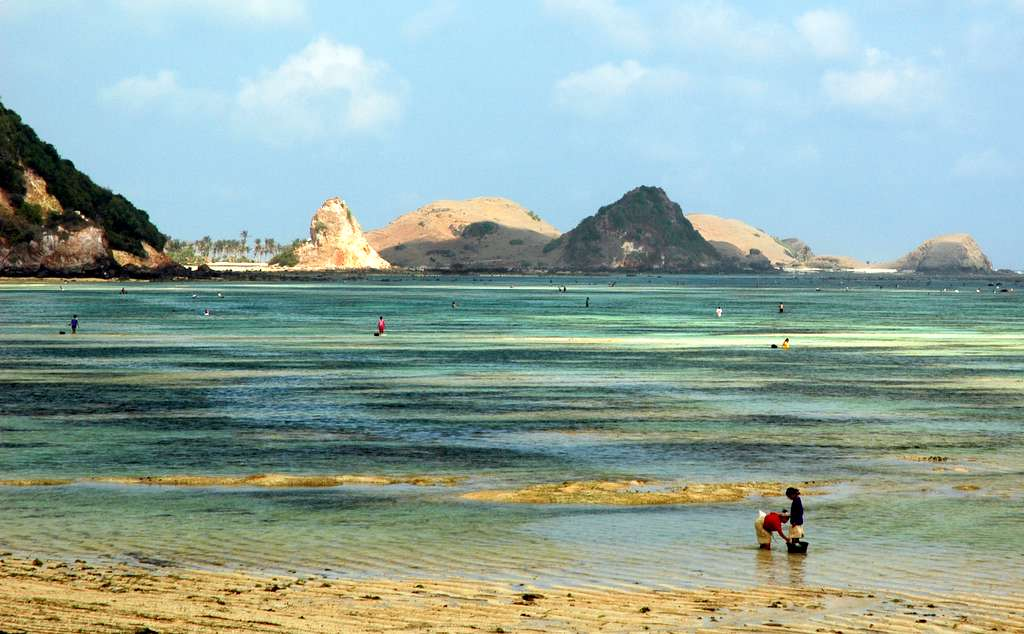
- Kuta beach

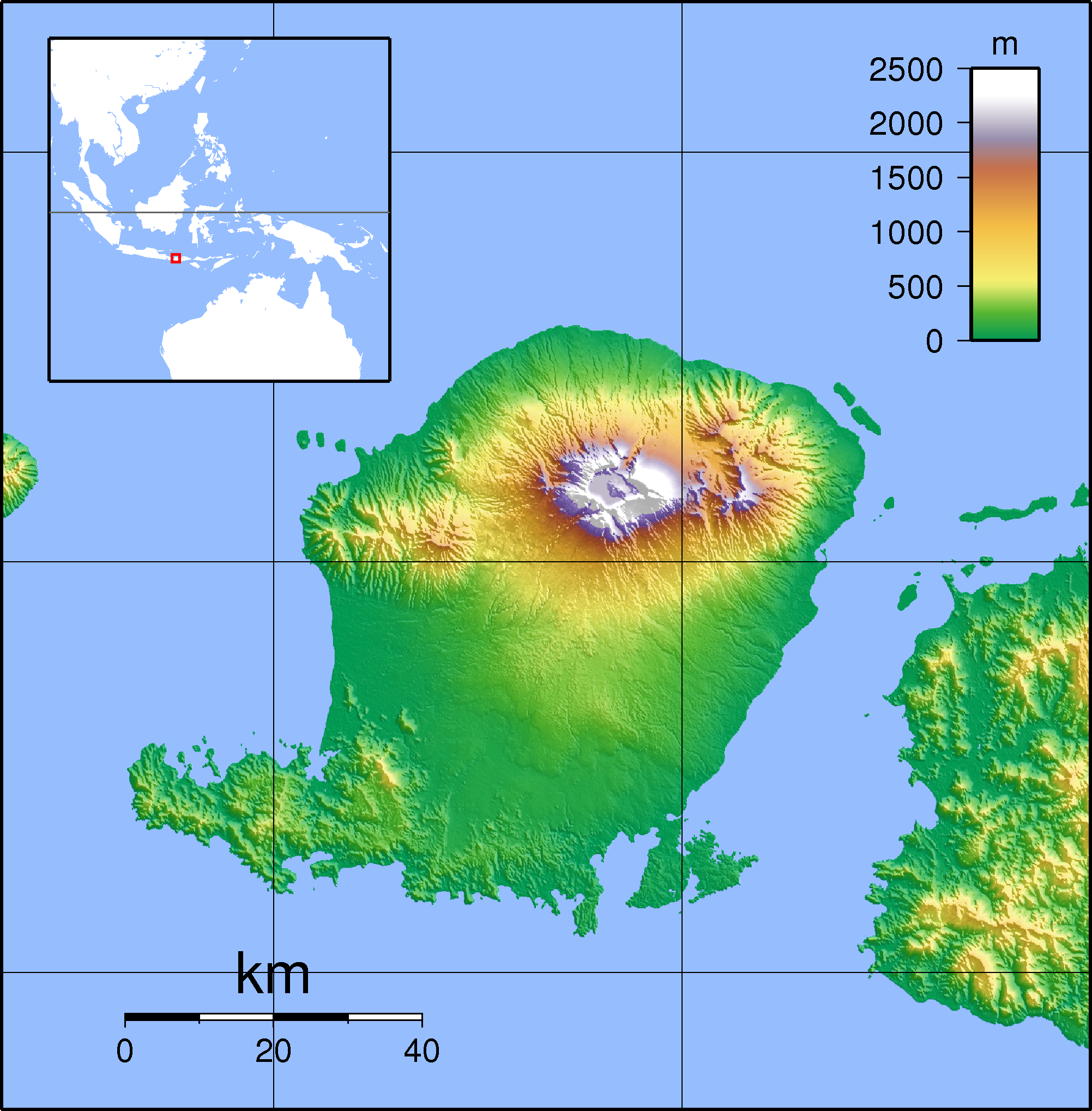
- Location in Indonesia Kuta, Lombok (Indonesia)
- Coordinates: 8°55′S 116°17′E
- Country: Indonesia
- Region: Lesser Sunda Islands
- Province: West Nusa Tenggara
- Regency: Central Lombok
- Time zone: UTC+08

Kuta is a town on the south coast of the island of Lombok in the Indonesian province West Nusa Tenggara. Kuta is known for its many beautiful beaches and surf spots within close proximity and has developed into the main tourist town in Lombok. In a few short years, Kuta has changed from a sleepy seaside village into the main focus of tourism development in Lombok.

Lombok international airport is only a 20 minutes drive from Kuta and this, coupled with more airlines offering direct flights to Lombok, has seen Kuta overtake Senggigi as the most popular and convenient tourist destination in Lombok.

Kuta was also very fortunate to escape the damage that decimated North Lombok and severely damaged many properties and hotels in Senggigi and the northwest Gili islands during the 2018 Lombok earthquakes.
