= Kot, Swat =

Coordinates: 35°28′07″N 72°35′38″E

Kot is a hill station in the Swat District of Pakistan. It is 4.4 km south of the town of Kalam on Route N-95, at an elevation of 2,034 m.
