= Koti (ship) =

Koti is a Panama-registered oil tanker that in December 2017 was seized by South Korea for suspected violations of United Nations sanctions against North Korea.

== See also ==
- Lighthouse Winmore
