= Kot, Fatehpur =

Kot, Fatehpur Kot
- Village
- Location in Uttar Pradesh, India Kot, Fatehpur (India)
- Coordinates: 25.521995°N 81.103821°E
- Country: India
- State: Uttar Pradesh
- District: Fatehpur district

Languages
  - Official: Urdu, Hindi
- Time zone: UTC+5:30 (IST)
- Vehicle registration: UP

Kot (2001 pop. 3,920) is a village in the southeast corner of Fatehpur district in the state of Uttar Pradesh, India. The village was founded by Malik Bahbal (Izzuddin Malik Bahbal), in the 12th century. Kot has 12 smaller satellite villages. They are Kot, Minatara, Ghazipur, Manmai, Kulli, Rahmatpur, Shivpuri, Parvezpur (Parbetpur), Adhaiya, oraha, Shahnagar and Ratanpur. The People of Area Also Call Themselves Kukhar or Kokkhar, Khan while some also call themselves as Khokhar. While As Researchers of Their Community, Mr. Habib Ahmad Khan (Rahbar Koti) And Many Other Authors Write About Their Community as Kukhar And Kokkhar in Their Books. Another community from this area is the Kshatriyas, who call themselves Chandrauls, Chandelas or Chandravashi Kshatriya (descendants of King Parikshit).

== History ==
The Khokhar Khanzada tribe, originally numbering almost 100,000, has lived in Kot, Fatehpur district, for nearly 800 years. As of 2011, the population of Kokkhars living in the Kot area is estimated at about 5,000; other Kok'khars are scattered around many parts of India. Most of the original population emigrated to Pakistan. Many others moved to Jabalpur, Bhopal, Barkhera, Valsad,(Gujarat) Harda file ward, Vapi, Hyderabad, Mumbai, Kolkata, Delhi, Jaunpur, Partabgard, Durg-Bhilai, Visakhapatnam, Bhubneshwar, Bilaspur, Itarsi, Banda, Charkhari (Bundelkhand) and other parts of India. Some emigrated to the Middle East, Dubai, Saudi Arabia, Kuwait, Qatar, Oman, the US, Canada, the UK, Germany, Australia and other countries for economic gain. The worldwide Kok'khar population may be as high as 800,000.Most of these khokhars are wealthy and reputed families around the world.

The army of King Babar (which was passing through the area) recruited them because of their ferocity in warfare.

Another reference indicates that the Kok'khars are a tribe of the Rajput clan (inferred due to their ruling status in the Kuh-i-Jud regions of Punjab), and have allied with other clans (such as the Janjua) in pushing back the Ghorid armies from the region.

"Ghakkar" and "Kakar" are other variations of Kokkhar. Although they are not of Chandra, Surya or Agnikula Vansh lineage, they were given the status of Rajput Pathan by the priests of their time; it was not a self-proclaimed title. This demonstrates that the Kokkhars are not Jatts, Thakurs or any other military tribe of India, and may not be an indigenous ethnic group. Many defeated royal figures with Uzbek, Persian and Pashtun origins became Lashkari (allies of passing warlords), the Kokkhars among them. They are mistakenly thought to have been in frequent conflict with the Indian Jatts, Thakurs and Rajputs; rather, they sided with the Jatts, Rajputs and Moguls against the Ghorides.Khokkhars also played an important role in India's freedom .

The term "Kokkhar" is equivalent to "barbarian" in Europe, since they originated in Central Asia. They were Huns, who rapidly attacked and influenced northern India. The Kokkhars played a similar role to British Empire with respect to northern India's empires as the barbarians (or the Huns) did for the Roman Empire. More research is needed, since much Kokkhar history is currently unknown.

== Ethnicity ==
Many Kokkhar elders living in Kot refer to their ancestors as Ajbuk, an Uzbek word meaning "wild warriors". Rivalries (sometimes escalating to armed hostility) have traditionally been frequent between – and within – various Kokkhar groups. Historical and geographic factors have spawned diversity within the Kokkhars. The relationship between tribe and ethnic group is complex, and all Kokkhar (including those in rural areas) consider themselves linked to the Pashtun people and the armies of the Moguls and Alauddin Khalji.

Despite a degree of social uniformity, many different phenotypes may be found in the Kokkhar population including blond-haired, blue-eyed Kok'khars. Those with darker features and epicanthic folds are considered to be descendants of Kokkhars. Tall, olive-skinned, mustachioed tribesmen and those who combine these features are said to be descendants of the Rajput and Kokkhar dynasties. Although it may be tempting to associate certain physical features with a particular ethnic group, scholars recognize that (since all human populations are capable of intermingling, and do so) there are more physical differences found within ethnic groups than between them. In general, Kokkhars living in Kot have light skin (nearly Caucasian); they are tall, and resemble the Uzbeks.

== Kot today ==
The Afghan and North Western Frontier's rugged environment isolated residential communities and created micro-environments with rigorous survival skills. Kot possesses a similar topography; it is located near the Yamuna River at high altitude, providing a spectacular scenery of ancient fortified fortresses. Members of the different Kokkhar groups and Khandans residing in different locations must adapt to their own micro-environments. Many Kokkhars use Khan as a surname, while others have adopted the surname Kokkhar. Many Kokkhars (in Kot, elsewhere in India and abroad) are involved in business; some are bureaucrats, or otherwise in public service (including members of the military and police forces).

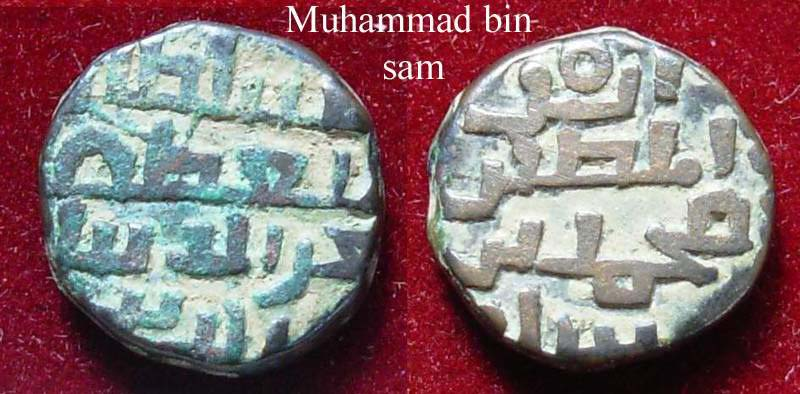
Copper coin

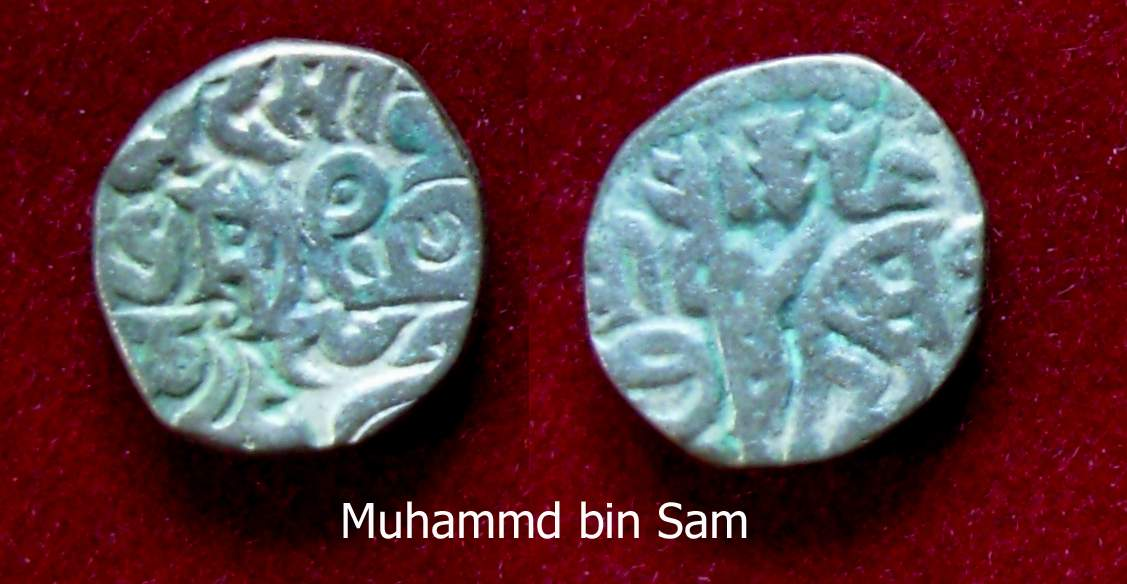
Bull and horseman type copper coin
