= Kuta (caste) =

The Kuta are a Hindu caste found in the state of Uttar Pradesh in India. They are also known as Dhankuta .

== Origin ==
The Kuta are an occupational Hindu caste traditionally associated with rice husking. According to some traditions, the word kuta is a corruption of the Hindi word kutna, which means to pound. The Kuta themselves claim to be Yaduvanshi Rajputs, who took up the occupation of rice husking. Over time this change of occupation led to the formation of a distinct community. They are a small community, found mainly in the districts of Bahraich, Moradabad and Shahjahanpur.

== Present Circumstances ==
The Kuta are strictly endogamous and practice clan exogamy. They are divided into ten exogamous sub-divisions, known as paltis, namely the Chauhan, Parihar, Gahlot, Solanki, Hamoria, Shishwal, Chandravanshi, Rathor, Parmar and Kotak. The main function of the palti is to trace descent and to regulate their marriage alliances.

The Kuta have seen a decline in their traditional occupation, with the growth of rice mills. Most Kuta are now petty businessmen, setting up their own rice mills. Others are involved in the transportation business. Like other Hindu castes, they have set a caste association, the Dhankut Samaj Kalyan Samiti, which acts as a community welfare association. Each Kuta settlement also contains a biradari panchayat, an informal caste association, which acts as an instrument of social control.

== See also ==
- Lohar
