= Koryfi, Florina =

Koryfi
- Settlement
- Location within Greece
- Coordinates: 40°42′18″N 21°18′6″E
- Country: Greece
- Geographic region: Macedonia
- Administrative region: Western Macedonia
- Regional unit: Florina
- Municipality: Florina
- Municipal unit: Florina
- Community: Simos Ioannidis
- Time zone: UTC+2 (EET)
  - Summer (DST): UTC+3 (EEST)

Koryfi (Greek: Κορυφή, before 1927: Τούρια – Touria) is an abandoned village in Florina Regional Unit, Macedonia, Greece. The village had an altitude of 1,350 m (4,430 ft). It was part of the community of Simos Ioannidis.

== History ==
The inhabitants of Touria were Christian and belonged to the Bulgarian Exarchate. Between 1912 and 1928, the village population numbered 480. The population of Koryfi was 443 in 1940. In the Greek Civil War, the village was occupied by the Democratic Army of Greece (DAG). The inhabitants numbered 198 in 1951 and 219 in 1961.

For reasons of development and security, Koryfi was one of several Slavophone villages whose population was forcibly relocated by the Greek government and resettled in the plains during the late 1960s.
