= Stephen Robert Kuta =

British author (born 1978)

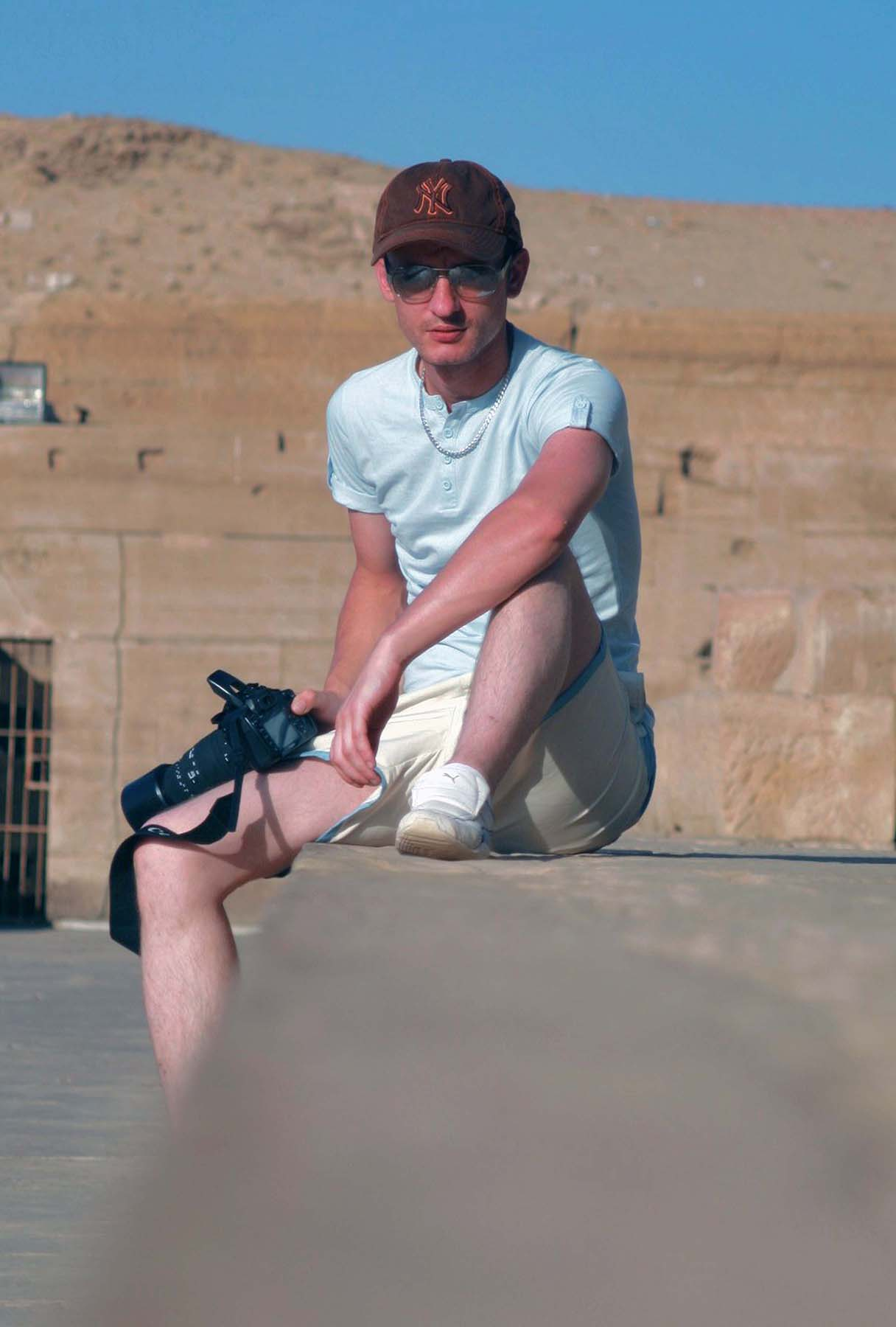
- Born: 11 June 1978 (age 48); Chelmsford, Essex, England
- Occupations: Author, Historian, Genealogist
- Partner: Peter Black
- Writing career
- Language: English
- Period: 1997 - Present
- Genres: History, Genealogy, Biography, Poetry
- Notable works: Paint The Sky with Stars, (Poetry and Prose in Remembrance of the Boxing Day Tsunami, 2004)
- Website: stephenkuta.com

Stephen Robert Kuta (ˈkʉːˌta) is a British author, poet, historian, and genealogist based in the UK. He has published several books and poetry anthologies.

== Published works ==
He published selected prose and poetry in several anthologies in the 1990s, including works within the publications; Moments in the Garden, A Few Precious Thoughts and A Quite Storm. He has been recognised by the Sunday Mirror newspaper for his prose written in remembrance of Diana, Princess of Wales, and published within The Sunday Mirror, September 14, 1997 (Princess Diana Commemorative edition).

In 2005, Kuta edited and published a limited edition book which was intended to bring together voices from around the world as a response to the tragic tsunami on Boxing Day 2004. Paint the Sky with Stars features a collection of poetry written by people affected by the Tsunami which caused so much damage in South East Asia. People from all sectors of society contributed to the anthology and the poetry is unique and reflective of the poets' thoughts surrounding this devastating natural disaster. All of the proceeds generated by the publication were donated to the Tsunami Earthquake Fund, and this book is now highly regarded as a valuable insight into social history. It is studied in several university degree courses. In 2018, he published his first selected works in the anthology Once I Write of Love.

Published in 2018, Kuta's My Life in Pictures is a photographic portfolio and autobiographical photo-biography which covers the life of a gay man over a period of four decades. The images include a range of self-portraits and professional shots, which were taken by Men Art. Much of the content of the book specifically focuses on LGBT Art, Stephen is an advocate for gay rights and has supported the LGBT Community at pride events in Brighton, London and Manchester. Kuta was also the first Gay man in Essex, England to commit to a civil partnership in January 2006, just six weeks after it became legal to do so in December 2005.

== Bibliography ==
- (2005). Paint the Sky With Stars: Selected Poetry in Remembrance of the Boxing Day Tsunami 2004. Re-invention UK LTD. ISBN 9780954989903.
- (2018). My Life in Pictures (1978 - 2018). Blurb, Incorporated. ISBN 9781388504199.
- (2018). Mrs Mary Plaskett 1739 - 1827. Blurb, Incorporated. ISBN 9781388479268.
- (2018). Once I Write of Love: Selected Poetry and Prose. Blurb Inc & distributed by Loma Publishing. ISBN 9781388407629.
- (2018). Selina's Letter, Tales of Suicide from Victorian and Edwardian London. Loma Publishing. ISBN 9781916476233.
- (2018). War and Verse, Poetry and Prose of World War One as seen in the wartime press. Re-invention UK. ISBN 9780954989927.
- (2019). Cape Town. Blurb, Incorporated. ISBN 9780368538964.
- (2019). Semper Fidelis, The Lwów Eaglets. Loma Publishing. ISBN 9781916476271.
- (2019). Life in Monochrome, Poetry and Prose. Re-invention UK. ISBN 9780954989934.
- (2019). For God's sake hold your tongue, and let me love, Selected Poetry and prose and Biography of John Donne. Loma Publishing. ASIN B07SRWNKGH.
- (2019). True Colours, The Beauty and Colour of Gay Pride (2008 - 2018). Black and Kuta Press. ASIN B07TZCH72F.
- (2019). Jubilee - London Pride 2019. Black and Kuta Press. ISBN 9781916273900
- (2020). Stormforge, Lightning Strikes on Seadragon Wings - Book One - The Jarl of Møre. Loma Publishing. ISBN 9781916476202
- (2020). The Horsemen of the Apocalypse. Re-invention UK. ISBN 9780954989958
- (2020). Stormforge, Lightning Strikes on Seadragon Wings - Book Two - The Duke of Normandy. Loma Publishing. ISBN 9781916476219
