= Kutas =

Kutas may refer to:

- Kutas, Hungary, a village in Somogy county
- Alexandra Kutas (born 1993), a Ukrainian model
- László Kutas (1936–2023), a Hungarian sculptor
- Marta Kutas (born 1949), an American professor of cognitive science
- Patrick Kutas (born 2004), an American football player
- Pavlo Kutas (born 1982), a Ukrainian footballer
- Kutas-patak, a waterway in Hungary, tributary of the Berettyó river

== See also ==
- Kuta (disambiguation)
- Kutasi
