= Central Lombok Regency =

Regency in West Nusa Tenggara, Indonesia

Central Lombok Regency Kabupaten Lombok Tengah
- Regency
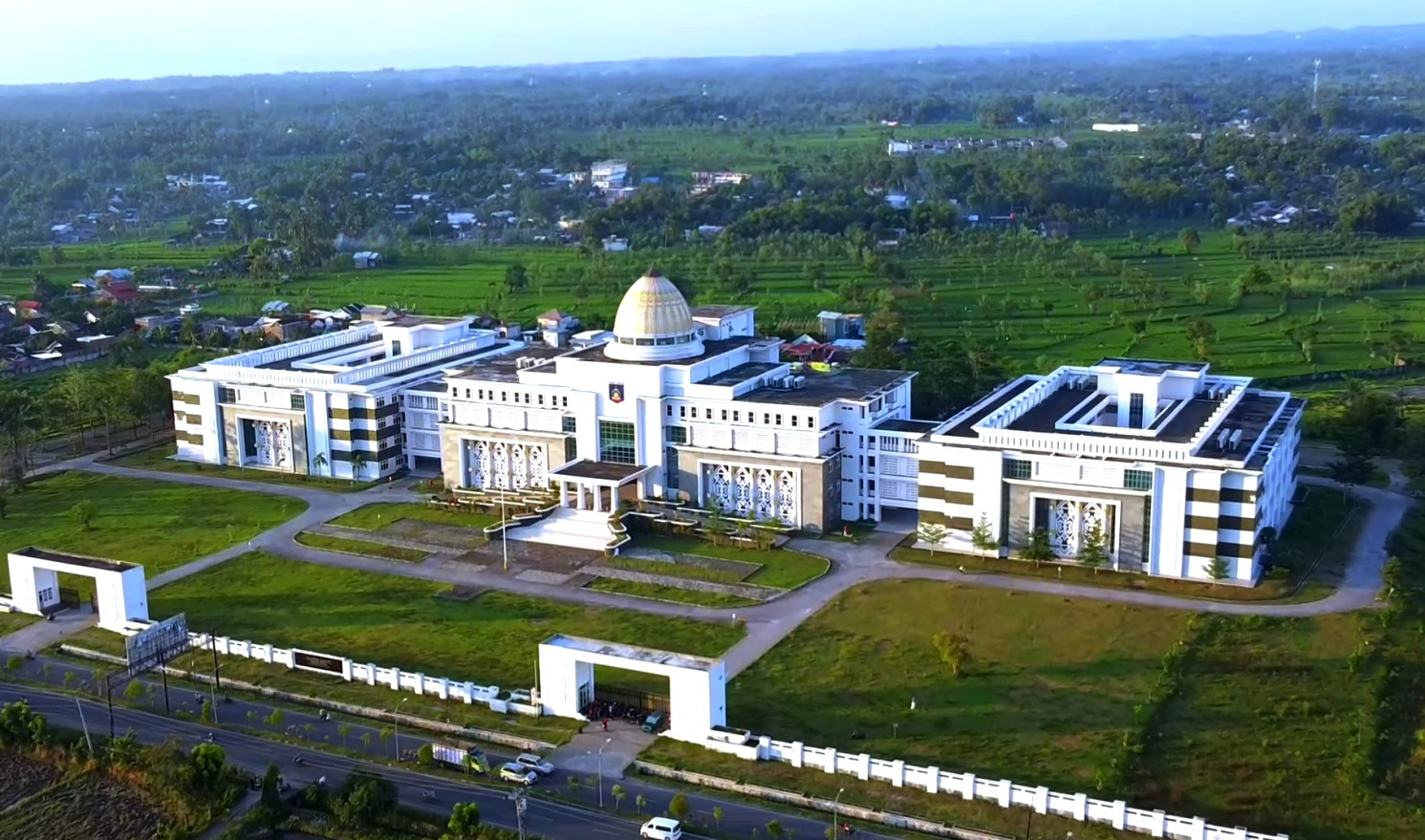
- Regent office of Central Lombok in Praya

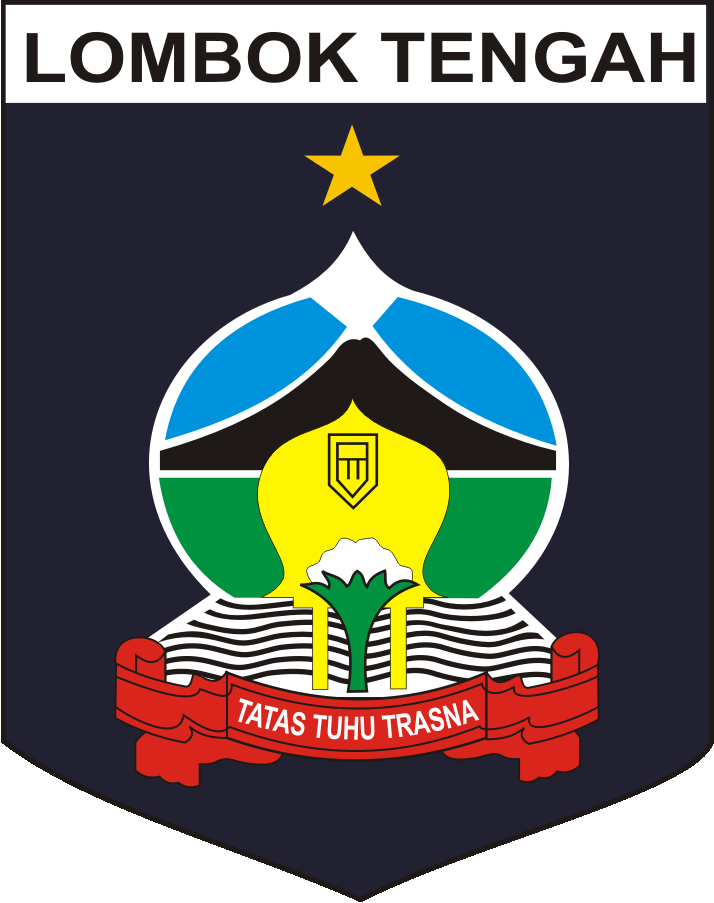
- Coat of arms
- Nickname: Lombok Tengah
- Motto: Tatas, Tuhu, Trasna (Able, Diligent, Affectionate)
- Location within West Nusa Tenggara

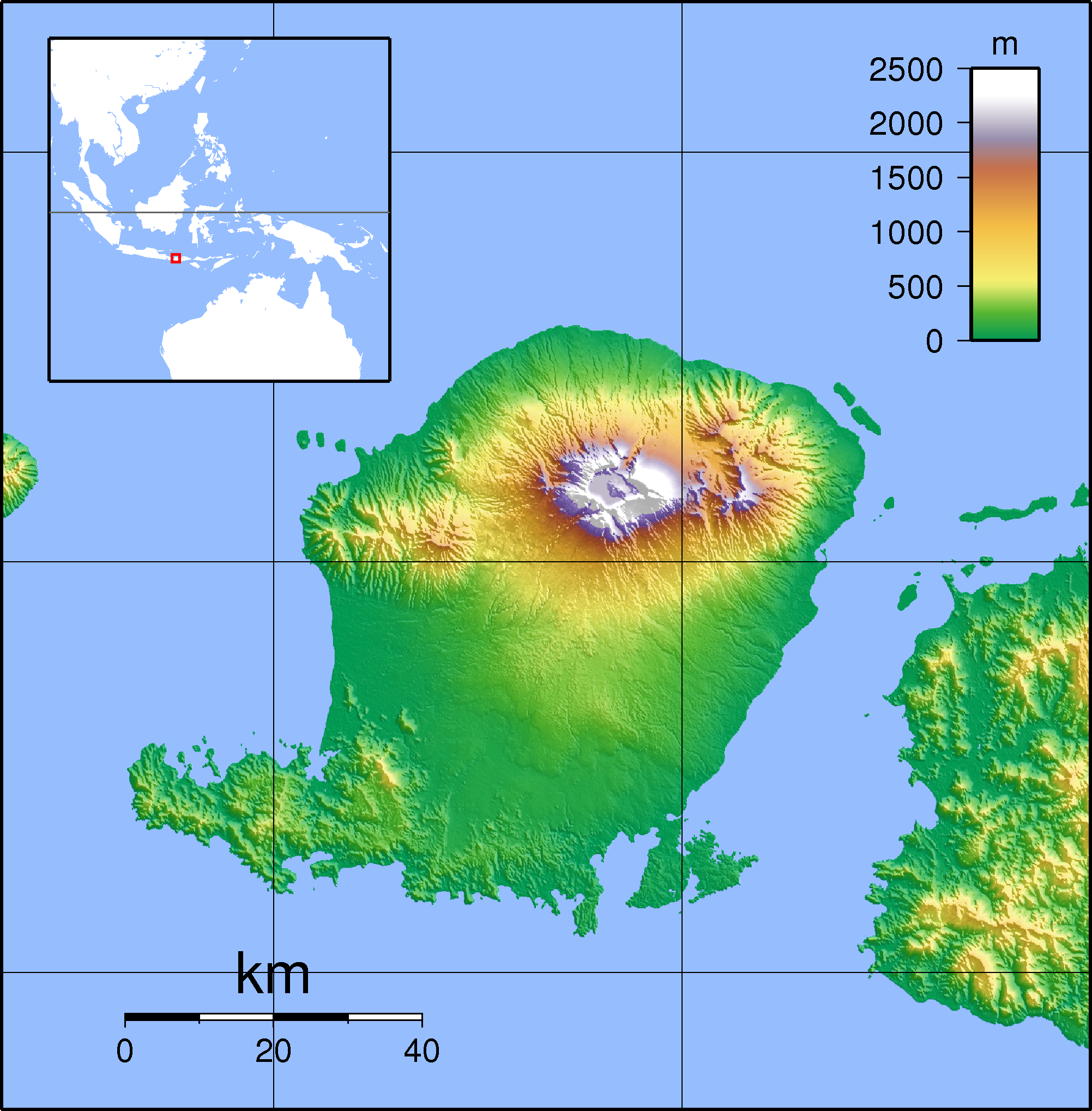
- Location in Lombok, Lesser Sunda Islands and Indonesia Central Lombok Regency (Lesser Sunda Islands) Central Lombok Regency (Indonesia)
- Coordinates: 8°42′S 116°16′E
- Country: Indonesia
- Province: West Nusa Tenggara
- Capital: Praya

Government
  - Regent: Lalu Pathul Bahri
  - Vice Regent: Nursiah

Area
  - Total: 1,168.13 km^{2} (451.02 sq mi)
- Elevation: 107 m (351 ft)

Population (mid 2025 estimate)
  - Total: 1,157,175
  - Density: 990.622/km^{2} (2,565.70/sq mi)

Demographics
  - Ethnic groups: Sasak, Balinese, Javanese, Sumbawa people, Flores people
  - Religion: Muslim, Hindu, Christian, Buddhist
  - Languages: Indonesian (official), Sasak
- Time zone: UTC+8 (ICST)
- Area code: (+62) 370
- Website: lomboktengahkab.go.id

Central Lombok Regency is a regency (Indonesian: Kabupaten) of the Indonesian Province of West Nusa Tenggara. It is located on the island of Lombok and the capital is Praya. It covers a land area of 1,168.13 km^{2}, and had a population of 859,309 at the 2010 census and 1,034,859 at the 2020 census; the official estimate as at mid 2025 was 1,157,175 (comprising 574,691 males and 582,484 females).

The other regencies of Lombok, all of which adjoin the Central Lombok Regency, are the East Lombok Regency, the West Lombok Regency and the North Lombok Regency. The region was first incorporated in accordance with Law Number 69 of the Year 1958. Tatas Tuhu Trasna, is the motto of the Central Lombok Regency.

== Administration ==
=== Administrative structure ===
Kabupaten Lombok Tengah (Central Lombok Regency) is one of Lombok's four Regencies or administrative regions.

- TGH M Zainul Majdi, MA., Governor of NTB (West Nusa Tenggara), (Mataram is the Provincial Capital of West Nusa Tenggara)
- M. Suhaili FT (Current), Regent (Bupati) of Central Lombok Regency (Indonesian: Kabupaten Lombok Tengah).

=== Administrative boundaries ===
Boundary	District	Regency
North		North Lombok Regency
South	Lombok Basin	Indian Ocean
West	Gerung, Mataram	West Lombok Regency
East		East Lombok Regency

== Administrative districts ==
Central Lombok Regency consists of twelve districts (kecamatan), tabulated below with their areas and their populations at the 2010 census and the 2020 census, together with the official estimates as at mid 2025. The table also includes the locations of the district administrative centres, the number of administrative villages in each district (totaling 127 rural desa and 12 urban kelurahan), and its postal codes.

Kode Wilayah	Name of District (kecamatan)	Area in km^{2}	Pop'n census 2010	Pop'n census 2020	Pop'n estimate mid 2025	Admin centre	No. of villages	Post codes
52.02.05	Praya Barat (West Praya) ^{(a)}	146.98	69,106	82,747	92,691	Penujak	10	83572
52.02.11	Praya Barat Daya (Southwest Praya)	131.66	51,280	57,797	65,881	Darek	11	83571
52.02.04	Pujut ^{(b)}	238.12	96,913	116,832	131,617	Sengkol	16	83573
52.02.06	Praya Timur (East Praya)	86.52	62,736	72,143	79,033	Mujur	10	83581
52.02.07	Janapria	67.38	70,175	84,590	95,114	Janapria	12	83554
52.02.09	Kopang	54.33	75,719	92,558	103,856	Kopang	11	83553
52.02.01	Praya	51.08	103,405	125,889	139,015	Praya	15 ^{(c)}	83511 -83522
52.02.10	Praya Tengah ^{(d)} (Central Praya)	62.80	59,891	72,661	81,670	Batunyala	12 ^{(e)}	83582 ^{(f)}
52.02.02	Jonggat	67.23	89,362	106,051	116,890	Ubung	13	83561
52.02.08	Pringgarata	44.52	62,841	75,644	84,478	Pringgarata	11	83562
52.02.03	Batukliang	52.19	71,512	87,852	98,995	Mantang	10	83552
52.02.12	Batukliang Utara (North Batukliang)	165.32	47,268	60,095	67,935	Teratak	8	83550
	Totals	1,168.13	860,209	1,034,859	1,157,175	Praya	139	

Notes: (a) includes 6 small islands off the south coast of Lombok Island. (b) includes 13 small islands off the south coast of Lombok Island.
(c) a town district, comprising 9 kelurahan (Gerunung, Gonjak, Leneng, Panji Sari, Perapen, Praya, Renteng, Semayan and Tiwugalih) and 6 desa.
(d) Praya Tengah District is situated to the southeast of Praya town, between that town and Praya Timur District.
(e) including 3 kelurahan (Gerantung, Jontlak and Sasake). (f) except the villages of Jontlak (postcode 83513) and Gerantung (postcode 83523).

Types of Use	Area (Ha)	%
Yards/ buildings	6,993	5.79%
Rice field	52,556	43.49%
Fields/Garden	12,420	10.28%
Farm/Clearing	12	0.01%
Pasture	85	0.07%
Enclosed water/dams	281	0.23%
Ponds/Pond	1,773	1.47%
Public Forests	2,583	2.14%
State Forest	21,158	17.50%
Plantation	5,461	4.51%
Other	17,517	14.49%
Total area of all	120,839	100.00%

== Climate and topography ==
Central Lombok has a tropical climate with long dry seasons. The rain season normally commences in October and continues until April with an average rainfall of above 100mm during these months. In December falls have reached 382 mm. From May until September average rainfall is below 100 mm with the lowest rainfall normally occurring in May. December normally has the highest frequency of rain days and the lowest occur in May. Topography of Central Lombok is mountainous in the north, including Mount Rinjani area with an altitude of about 1000 meters above sea level, suitable for plantation such as coffee, timber and other crops. The centre of the region is a low-lying and utilised for rice paddies and tobacco. The southern areas are dry and denuded with some undulating hilly areas of between 100 and 355 meters above sea level.

The dominant soil types in Central Lombok Regency are 41,635 ha complex of Mediterranean Chocolate (34%), Grey Gromusol 34,306 (28%) and Grey regosol 20,387 (17%).

== Services and development ==
The region is essentially agrarian in activity with rice, copra, casava, tobacco, timber and other crops. Rainfall is lower in the south of the Regency and higher in the north as the land rises toward Mount Rinjani and the land becomes more fertile and productive. Rinjani supplies a rainfall catchment area to the region and several into central Lombok rivers flow from its slopes. The sea supports a small local fishing industry, a fish market, a pearling industry, seaweed harvesting, traditional weaving, pottery and handicraft production. The growing tourism industry in Lombok has had little effect on the eastern coast. The proximity of the new Lombok International Airport will possible lead to an increase in tourism related business and development in Central Lombok in coming years.

== Education ==
Currently in Central Lombok Regency there are 226 junior and elementary schools, 82 junior high schools and 46 high schools in addition to an increasing number of private schools. The regency's higher education needs are served by the University of Mataram in the nearby city of Mataram.

== Transportation ==
Public buses and Bemo run both to the west coast and the city of Mataram and further on through Pusuk pass to connect to north Lombok and Tanjung. Limited services are available on the east coast to connect to Praya and south toward Kuta.

Vehicle and passenger ferries service central Lombok from both the east and west coasts of the island.

- Alat Strait: Labuhan Lombok - Pototano, Sumbawa with 8 ferries providing 18 crossings per day.
- Lombok Strait: Lembar, Lombok - Padang Bai, Bali, with 12 ferries providing crossings once every hour.

Tanjung Lembar seaport in the southwest of the island provides facilities for small freighters and fishing boats.

These drive on, drive off ferries provide the principal facilities for road transport movements in and out of Lombok. Disruptions on these routes can significantly affect trade and the provision of supplies to the island as the shipping operators on these routes will often suspend services due to breakdown or heavy seas.

Central Lombok is served by the Lombok International Airport (Bandara Internasional Lombok) (IATA: LOP, ICAO: WADL). The new airport provides domestic terminal facilities serving destinations in Java, Bali and Sumbawa. The main terminal building also provides international terminal facilities. International flights to Kuala Lumpur are provided by Garuda and Merpati airlines depart from the Domestic terminal.

The new international airport will provide facilities for wide bodied aircraft with more modern terminal facilities and improved cargo facilities.

Lombok International Airport is south west of Praya in south Central Lombok. The airport commenced operations on 1 October 2011 replacing the previous international and domestic facilities at Selaparang Airport near Ampenan in West Lombok Regency which formally closed for operations on the evening of 30 September 2011. All services previously operated at the Selaparang airport were moved across to the new airport at that time.

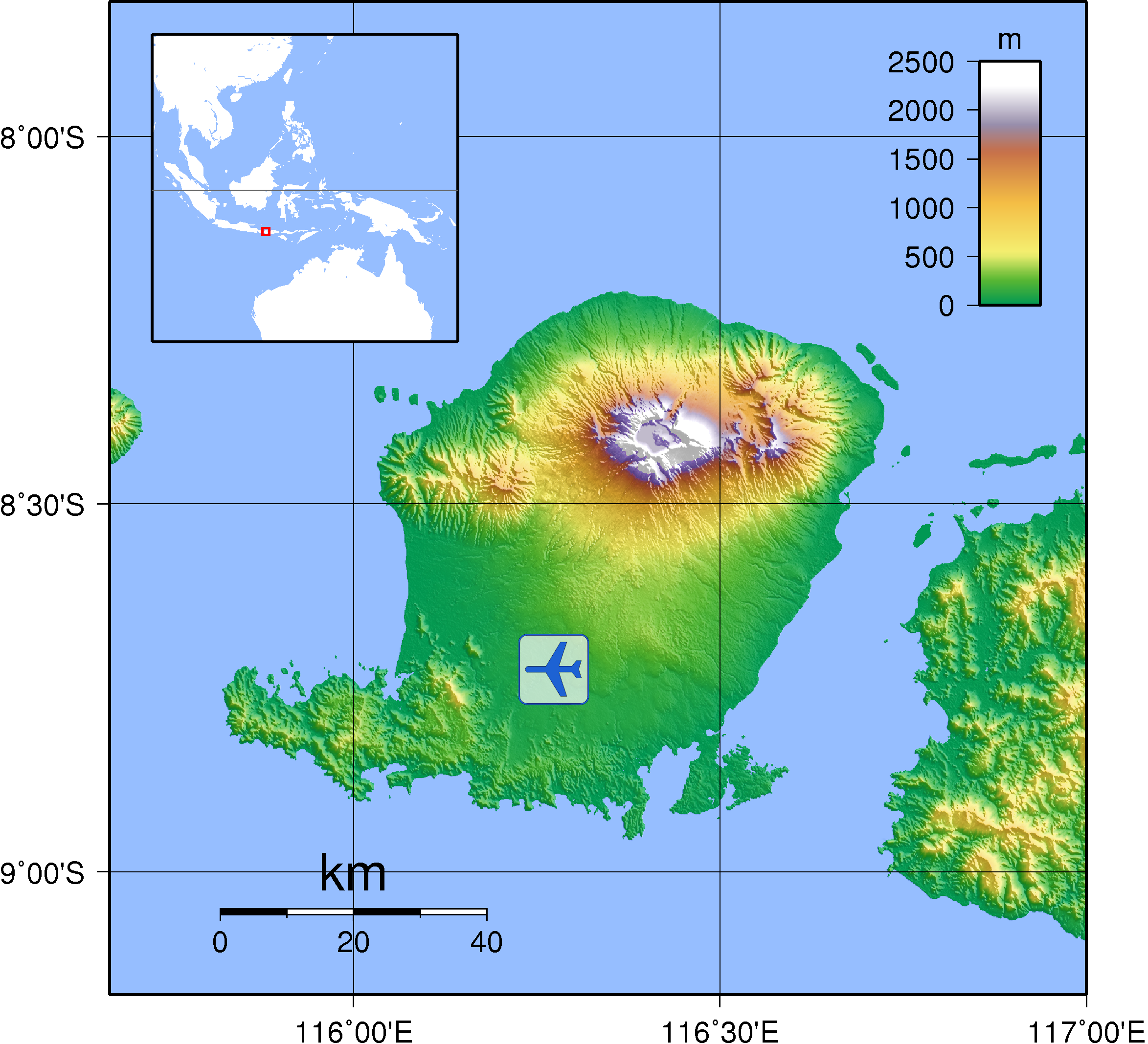
Location of New Lombok International Airport on the island of Lombok

== Location of New Lombok International Airport ==
The new Lombok International Airport was developed in accordance with ICAO guidelines and specification. The airport size consists of 553 hectares (1,370 acres) and incorporates a modern convenient terminal supporting passenger requirements.

The airport site is at Tanak Awu, in Kabupaten Lombok Tengah (Regency of Central Lombok), Lombok, Indonesia, south west of Mataram the provincial capital of Nusa Tenggara Barat and a few kilometers south west of the small regional city of Praya. The surface connections were still under construction in late 2011 following the official commencement of operations at the airport and some of the rights of way for the connecting highway to Mataram were still in disputation with the current landowners. The project completion was much delayed and the proposed opening date was moved back several times. When the airport opened on 1 October 2011 many of the terminal and passenger handling facilities remained incomplete causing some inconvenience to both passengers and airline operations.

== Tourism ==
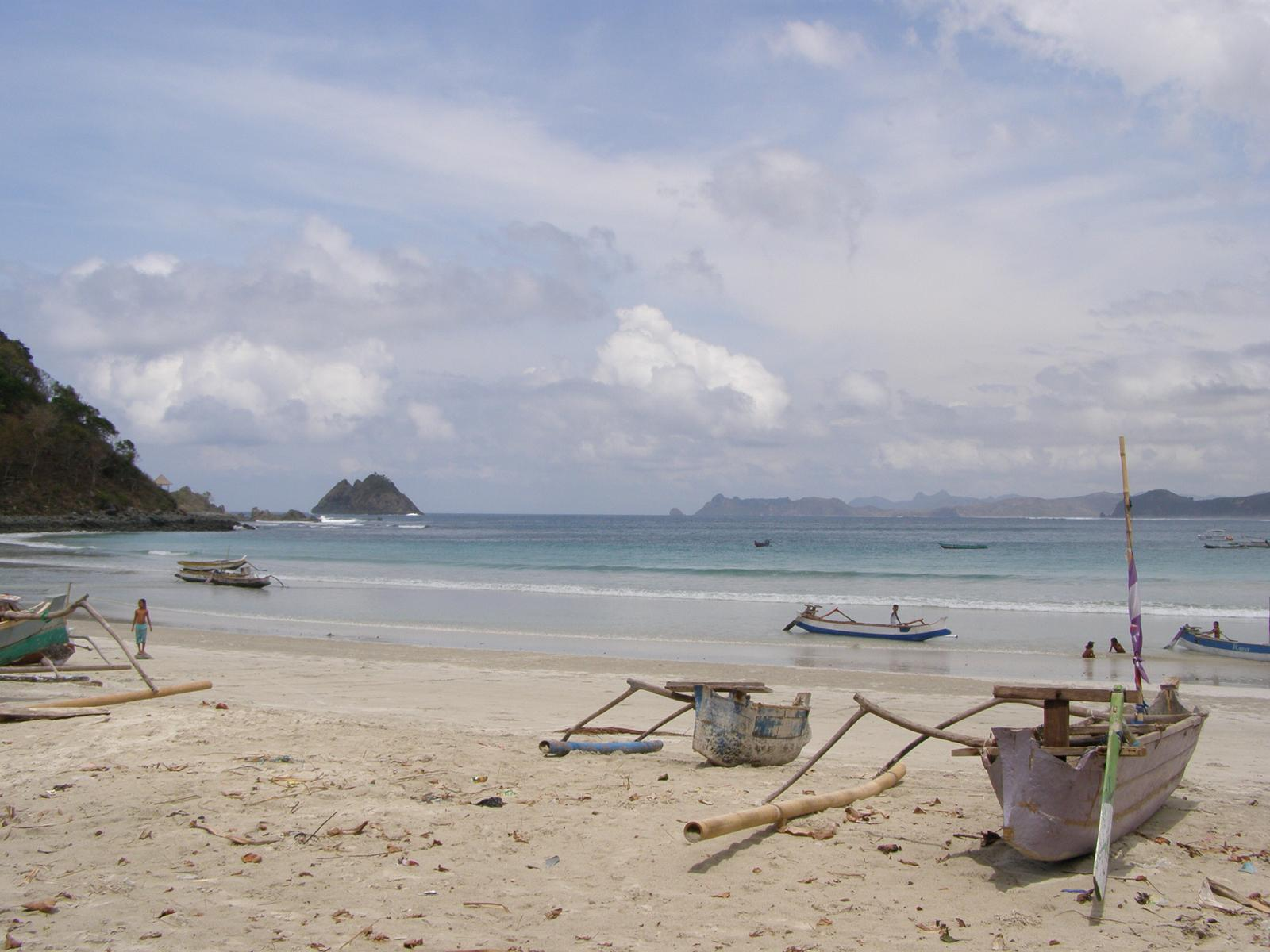
Beach at Selong Belanak, central south coast of Lombok

The natural assets of Central Lombok include rice paddies, tobacco growing areas and some established nature reserves. The south of Lombok features white sandy beaches, some of it quite isolated, remote and with limited access.

Notable beaches are Pantai Gerupuk, Pantai Awang, Tanjung A'nn, Pantai Seger, Kuta Beach, Selong Belanak, Mawi Beach, Pantai Tomang, Are Guling Beach, Pantai Pengatap, Rowok, Torok Aik Belek, and Pantai Mawun. Other attractions lie in the hills of central lombok rising toward Mount Rinjani. Surfing is very popular with local and international visitors and the south coast has some popular destinations for international surfers and travellers. Fishing villages, grouper fish cultivation, pearl cultivation, the traditional fish market and coral reefs also attract visitors to this part of Lombok. The area also supports traditional weaving and handicraft production. Individual tourists or tour guides often arrange small personalised tours or private visits to see traditional weaving and religious ceremonies.

Mount Rinjani is at the northern flank of Central Lombok. It is popular tourist attraction and activities include trekking, study of rare tropical flora and local fauna.

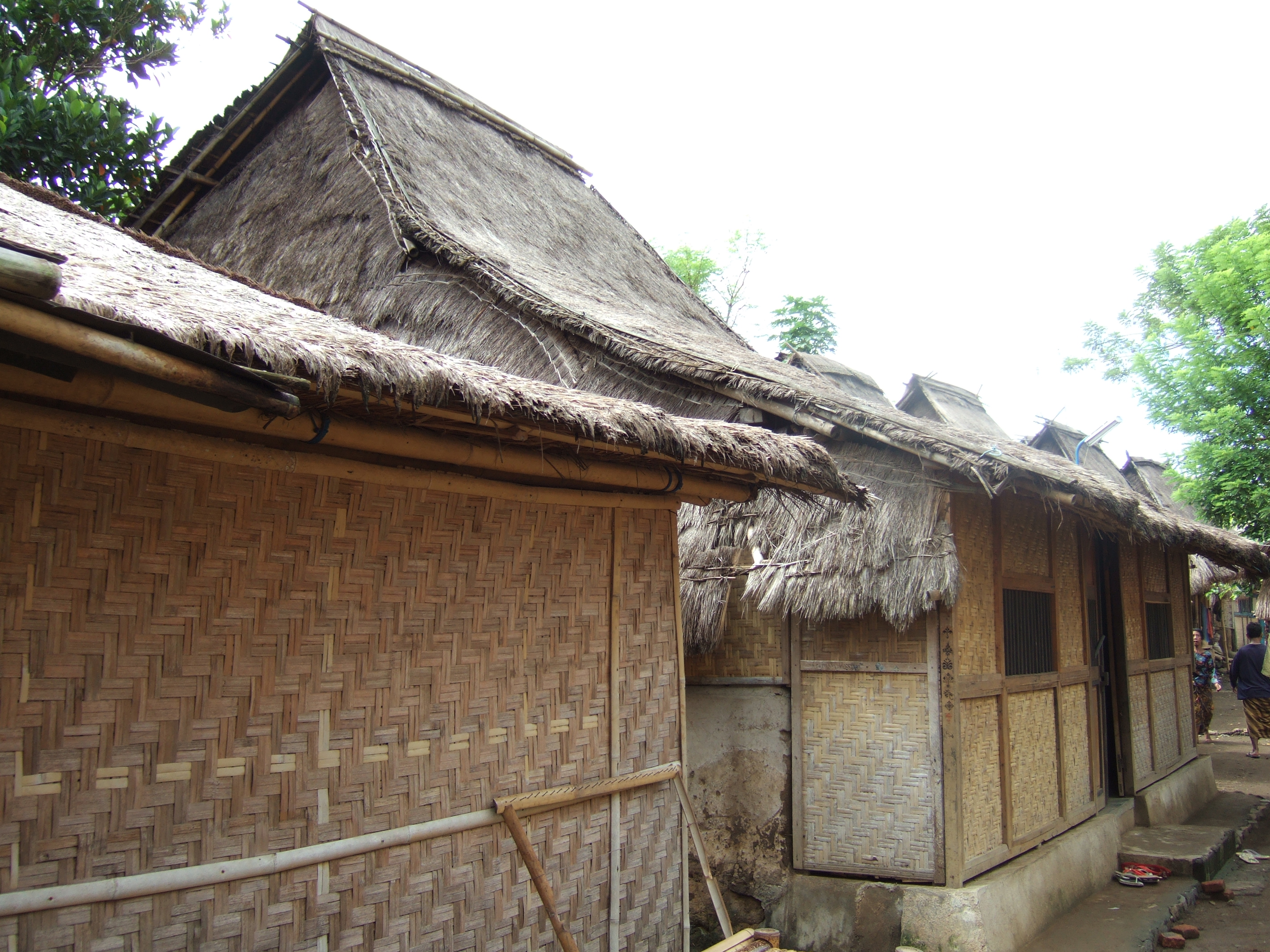
The customary hamlet of Sade

Objects of cultural heritage in this part of the island include Sade kampung adat (customary hamlet), Hamlet NDE, a location of a traditional housing, traditional villages, local arts and traditional ceremonies. Mosque Mount Pujut is a historic local mosque. Other historic attractions are the tomb of King Pejanggik, the tomb of Nyatok, and Clack Tomb and Mausoleum, the tomb of Serewe Islamic religious figures.

In 2010 the region supported 25 hotels of mixed classes across the general area of Central Lombok Regency with 16 of these properties situated in the Kuta area.

On 21 October 2011 President Susilo Bambang Yudhoyono officiated at the groundbreaking ceremony of the Mandalika Resort Development Project. Six Memorandums of Understanding (MoU) on the development of the site were signed in conjunction with the groundbreaking ceremony.

The Mandalika Resort Development Project is planned to be undertaken on an about 1,200 hectares site in Kuta, Pujut subdistrict and has a projected value of US$3 billion. Plans have been detailed for hotel, villa and a high end resort projects. A Formula One circuit, a plenary room for concert events, a seaport for excursions and other ships, and an integrated Disneyland styled theme park, an underwater park and a technical park have also been proposed. US$250 million or about Rp2.2 trillion is projected to come from state-owned firms (BUMN).

The Mandalika project is also expected to be included as one of the country's special economic zones presenting potential fiscal and non-fiscal arrangements to investors to engage in development of the provinces tourism sector. The proposal to grant special economic zone status to Mandalika resort area was based upon Law No. 30/2011 of the regulations covering Special Economic Zones and included in Government Regulation Number 2 / 2011 (on the Implementation of the Special Economic Zones).

Bali Tourism Development Corporation (BTDC) will manage Mandalika Tourism Area which has 5 beaches in Southern Lombok Island: Kuta Beach, Serenting Beach, Aan Cape, Keliuw Beach and Gerupuk Beach. The area is 1,179 hectares will be divided in 3 zonas:

- luxury residentials in the west part
- hotels, villas and public utilities in the central part
- exclusive hotels and villas in the east part

The project is planned for 20 to 30 years and for the first time will be developed in Kuta Beach Area since June 2012 which the land acquisitions have been finished.
