= Kot (union council) =

- Union Council
- Country: Pakistan
- Province: Khyber Pakhtunkhwa
- District: Malakand

Government
  - Provincial representative of PTI: Shafqat Ayaz
- Time zone: UTC+5 (PST)

Kot is an administrative unit, known as Union council, of Malakand District in the Khyber Pakhtunkhwa province of Pakistan.

District Malakand has 2 Tehsils i.e. Swat Ranizai and Sam Ranizai. Each Tehsil comprises certain numbers of Union councils. There are 28 union councils in district Malakand.

== See also ==
- Malakand District

Shafqat Ayaz is a Pakistani social worker and politician. He was born on 28 May 1988 in union council Kot dargai district malakand khyber pakhtunkhwa Pakistan. He is a nutrition consultant at northwest general hospital Peshawar and Joint secretary of PTI Malakand division. He remained student politician and worked on different position in Insaf student federation. He was elected president of University of Agriculture Peshawar in 2011, then he became unopposed president of Peshawar University Campus (All 7 Universities) in 2013.
