= Kottas =

Slavophone revolutionary chieftain in Western Macedonia during the Macedonian Struggle

Kottas Christou Kote Hristov
- Коте Христов
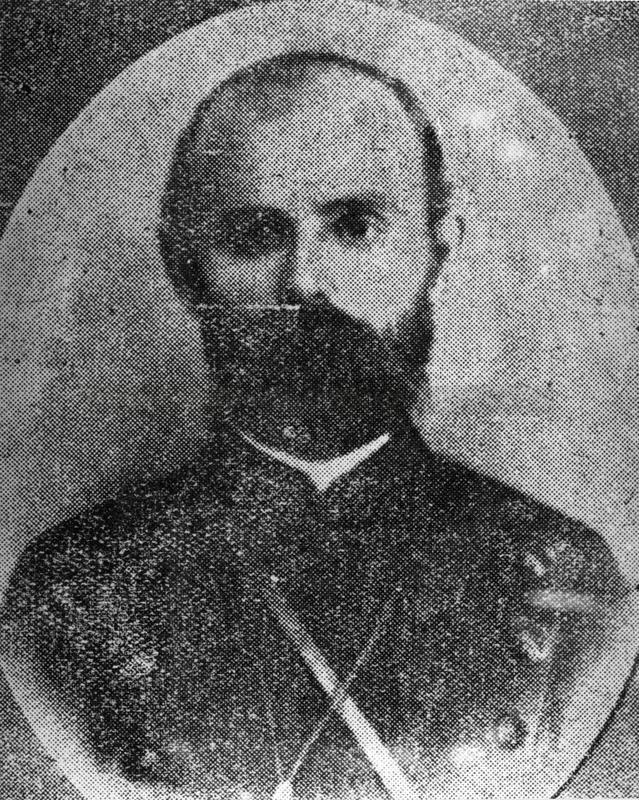
- A portrait of Kottas.
- Born: c. 1863; Roulia, Monastir Vilayet, Ottoman Empire (modern Kotas, Florina Greece)
- Died: c. 1905 (aged 41–42); Monastir, Monastir Vilayet, Ottoman Empire (now Bitola, Republic of North Macedonia)
- Cause of death: Execution by hanging
- Spouse: Zoi Sfektou
- Children: 8 - Sofia Christou, Dimitrios Christou, Sotirios Christou, Vasiliki Christou, Christos Christou, Lazaros Christou, Paschalini Christou and Evangelos Christou
- Military career
- Allegiance: IMRO (1899–1900); HMC (1900–1905)
- Service years: 1898–1905
- Nicknames: Kote (Коте); Kottas (Κώττας)
- Units: Korestia band (1898–99); Kostur band (1900); Karavangelis' band (1900–05)
- Conflicts: Ilinden Uprising; Macedonian Struggle

Kottas Christou (Greek: Κώττας Χρήστου) or Kote Hristov (Bulgarian/Macedonian: Коте Христов), known simply as Kottas or Kote, and often referred to as Konstantinos Christou (Greek: Κωνσταντίνος Χρήστου), was a Slavophone Greek revolutionary chieftain in Western Macedonia during the Macedonian Struggle.

A native of Roulia, Kottas served as its village elder and later was involved in anti-Ottoman rebel activity, killing several Ottoman officers. He was first associated with the pro-Bulgarian Internal Macedonian Revolutionary Organization (IMRO) and afterwards with the pro-Greek irregular Hellenic Macedonian Committee. He was captured by the Ottomans, convicted of robbery and hanged in Monastir in 1905.

== Life ==
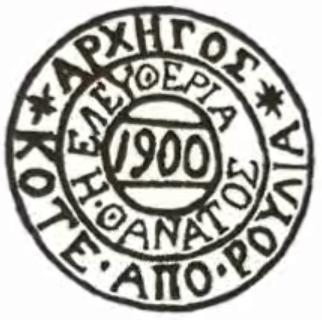
His seal, in Greek, while member of the IMRO (1900). The slogan "Eleftheria i Thanatos (Freedom or Death), was the central slogan of Greek War of Independence.

Kottas Christou was born in the Patriarchist village of Roulia (modern Kotas) c. 1860 and was an Orthodox Christian. Kottas was a monolingual Slavophone, who spoke Bulgarian or Macedonian. He had a Greek identity. Kottas became the muhtar (a leading notable) of Roulia in 1896. Starting from the early 1890s he fought against a powerful Albanian bey, Kasim of Kapshticë and from the mountains Kottas conducted operations against the Albanians. From 1898 onward he led an armed group which fought the Muslim beys in the Korestia region. Kottas and members of his band killed Kasim, while the bey's sons had their rival Hussain Bey of Bilisht arrested over the crime.

Based in the mountains, the popularity of Kottas rose as he challenged the Albanian and Ottoman presence in the region who oversaw the requisition of supplies. The Kottas band also killed Abdin Bey near Lake Kastoria. His anti–Ottoman stance led to contact by the Internal Macedonian Revolutionary Organization (IMRO) and he became one of their members. Disputes with the organisation over instructions, methods and discipline, Kottas joined the Greek side in 1902. His allegiances shifted from pro–Bulgarian to pro–Greek. The Greek bishop of Kastoria, Germanos Karavangelis played an important role in recruiting Kottas to join the Greek side after discussions with him about Bulgarian irredentism. An attack by the Ottoman army on Roulia in 1902 was resisted by Kottas, later Ottoman reinforcements made him flee and the inhabitants leave, while the village was looted.

According to the resident of Kastoria Georgi Raykov, Kotas was the initiator of his co-villagers renouncing the Greek Patriarchate and recognizing the Bulgarian Exarchate. Also, according to Raykov, Kotas attempted to kill the Greek Metropolitan Philaret, but the bishop found out and avoided the ambush.

Gotse Delchev had repeatedly pardoned and vainly tried to reform Kottas before he was finally outlawed by the IMRO, after entering the service of the Greek bishop. At the time of the Ilinden Uprising (1903), when all old wrongs were forgiven in the name of the common struggle, Kottas was received back by the IMRO at the insistence of Lazar Poptraykov, the same voivode he set out to kill. During the uprising, Poptraykov had been wounded and taken refuge with Kottas, who used the opportunity to kill him and present his head to the Greeks. The Greek bishop was wary of him because of his native Slavic tongue and hatred of Turks. His behavior toward the Ottomans was an obstruction to the Greek tactic, as it was often necessary to cooperate with the Ottoman officers against the Bulgarian enemy (IMRO).

Following the Ilinden Uprising, Kottas goes to Athens and sought Greek assistance against the Ottomans. In early 1904 Kottas accompanied by four Greek Army officers assembled several local notables at Gavros where he gave a patriotic speech in his language encouraging the fight for the Greek cause. Reprisals against Kottas occurred as the Bulgarians killed his brother–in–law during an incursion into Roulia. At the advice of Karavangelis, Kottas sent his two older sons to study in Athens, three other children were given to relatives and his wife and a daughter continued to live in the village.

Kottas, a veteran klepht, kidnapped Petko Yanev, a Bulgarian seasonal worker recently returned from America, and tortured him and his family until he had extracted all the savings Yanev had brought. However, Yanev complained vigorously to the vali Hilmi Pasha himself, and to foreign consuls. The British consul pressed Hilmi Pasha to act, and eventually, Kottas was arrested by the Ottomans. In June 1904 Ottoman forces surrounded Roulia and conducted a search of the village. Kottas hid in an outdoor oven and after his gun went off the Ottomans found and arrested him. His wife gathered all the children and fled to Kastoria. On the day of his hanging Kottas was led out of prison by an Ottoman escort and he attempted to escape through the narrow streets of Monastir. After a chase, Kottas was shot and wounded in the leg by the Ottomans and later executed by hanging in 1905 at Monastir. His last words before death, said in his native Lower Prespa dialect, were "Da zhive Gritsky/Gartsia!" (Long live Greece!). The loss of Kottas was detrimental to the Greek movement. After his death, many volunteers from Greece came to Macedonia to participate in the struggle, in addition to the locals.

== Legacy ==
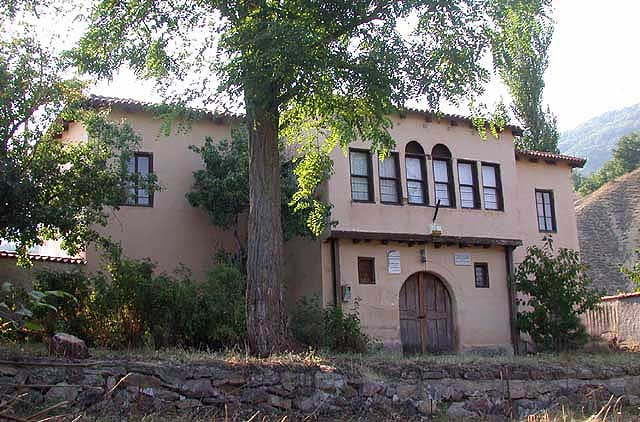
The Kottas Museum.

Kottas was married to Zoi Christou (née Sfektou), and together they had 8 children; Sofia Christou, Dimitrios Christou, Sotirios Christou, Vasiliki Christou, Christos Christou, Lazaros Christou, Paschalini Christou and Evangelos Christou. Kottas still has surviving descendants in Greece.

The village of Roulia was renamed after Kottas. His former house in the village is the Captain Kottas Museum dedicated in his honour. There is a bust of him in the village of his birth. There is a street named after him in Kastoria.

He is revered as a national hero in Greece, and considered a Bulgarophone Greek and the first fighter in the Greek Struggle for Macedonia, while he is considered a predatory warlord by Slavic Macedonians and a renegade Grecoman in Bulgaria. Kottas' objectives are not easily identifiable by contemporary historians. It seems that his chief goal was the rejection of Ottoman rule. From the beginnings of his insurgent action, without having a Greek or Bulgarian consciousness, he had formed the outlook of a Christian chieftain antagonizing Ottoman rule, whom IMRO was forced to coopt. After his distancing from the IMRO and the Exarchists -when they turned against other Christians-, his accession to the patriarchist camp and his recruitment in the Greek cause, his stance was characterized by fluidity, as he maintained relations with his former comrades, balancing between the two camps, but constantly opposed to Ottoman rule, contrary to Karavangelis.

Kottas is known for saying, "The difficult part is to kill the bear first, and then, it is easy to share the skin."

== Gallery ==
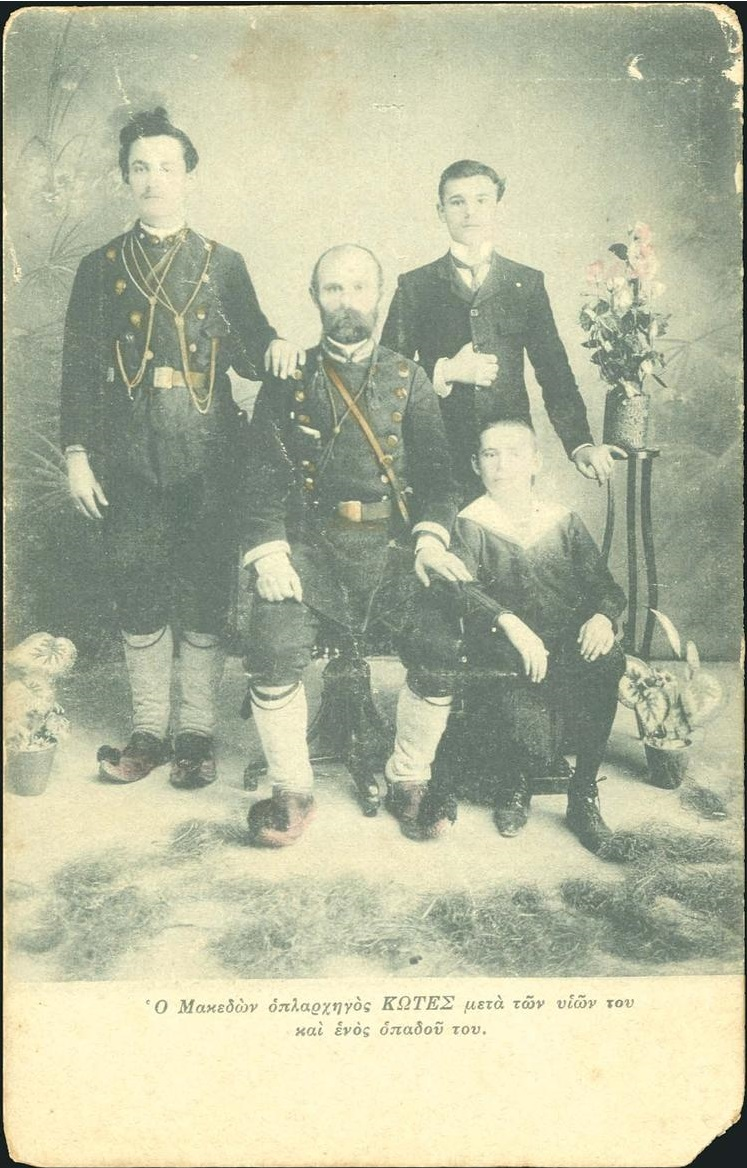
The photograph's inscription reads in Greek: "Macedonian warlord Kotes with his sons and a supporter."

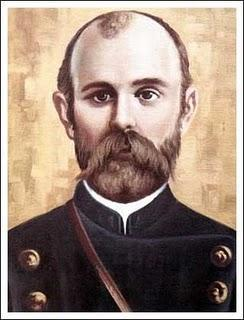
A painting of Kottas.

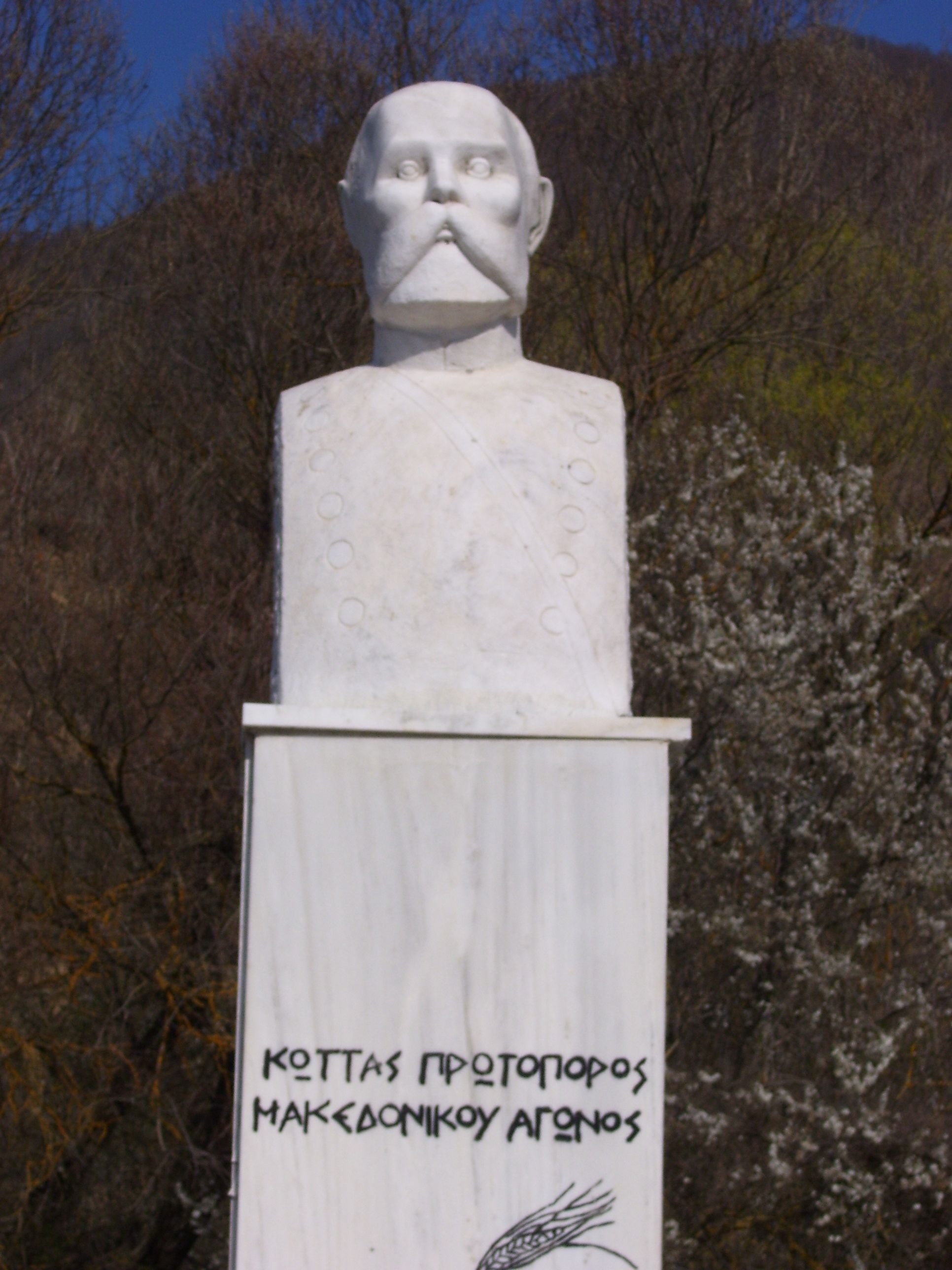
The bust of him in his village.

== Sources ==
- Koemtzopoulos, N (1968). Kapetan Kottas o Protos Makedonomachos [Captain Kottas the First Macedonian Freedom Fighter]. Athens.
- Kōnstantinos Apostolou Vakalopoulos; Apostolos Euangelou Vakalopoulos (1988). Modern history of Macedonia, (1830-1912). Barbounakis.
- Ricks, David; Trapp, Michael (2014). Dialogos: Hellenic Studies Review. Routledge. ISBN 978-1-317-79177-5.
- Ioannidou, Alexandra; Voss, Christian (2009). Spotlights on Russian and Balkan Slavic Cultural History. Sagner. ISBN 978-3-86688-070-2.
- Douphlias, Kōnstantinos (1992). Makedonia, Makedonikos agōnas [Macedonia, Macedonian Struggle] (in Greek). Aigaio Press.
- Modes, Georgios (2004). Anamnēseis [Memories] (in Greek). University of Macedonia Press. ISBN 978-960-8396-05-0.
