= Kōta (given name) =

Kōta, Kota, Kouta or Kohta (written: 耕太, 恒太, 康太, 皓太, 晃大 or 幸太) are masculine Japanese given names. Notable people with the name include:

- Kota Fujioka (藤岡 康太; 1988-2024), Japanese jockey
- Kota Fukatsu (深津 康太; born 1984), Japanese footballer
- Kouta Hirano (平野 耕太; born 1973), Japanese manga artist
- Kota Ibushi (飯伏 幸太; born 1982), Japanese professional wrestler
- Kota Kanai (金井 恒太; born 1986), Japanese shogi player
- Kota Mizuno (水野 宏太; born 1982), Japanese basketball coach
- Kota Mizunuma (水沼 宏太; born 1990), Japanese footballer
- Kota Wakabayashi (若林 康太; born 1997), Japanese sprinter
- Kōta Watanabe (footballer) (渡辺 皓太; born 1998), Japanese footballer
- Kota Watanabe (field hockey) (渡辺 晃大; born 1996), Japanese field hockey player
- Kohta Arakawa (荒川 晃大; born 2002), Japanese motorcycle racer

== Fictional characters ==
- Kouta (Digimon), a character in the manga series Digimon Chronicle
- Kouta (耕太), of the manga series Elfen Lied
- Kouta Bitou (尾藤 吼太), a character in the tokusatsu series Ninpuu Sentai Hurricaneger
- Kota Hoshikawa (星川 コウタ), a character in the anime series Brave Exkaiser
- Kota Izumi (出水 洸汰), a character in the manga series My Hero Academia
- Kouta Kazuraba (葛葉 紘汰), a character in the tokusatsu series Kamen Rider Gaim
- Kouta Oyamada (小山田 耕太), of the light novel series Kanokon
- Kōta Tsuchiya (土屋 康太), a character in the light novel series Baka and Test
- Kouta Asahina (朝比奈 コウタ), a character in the anime series Little Battlers Experience WARS
