= 2012 Liga Indonesia Second Division (BLAI) =

Liga Indonesia Second Division
- Season: 2011–12
- Champions: Persinab Nabire

The 2012 Liga Indonesia Second Division season (Indonesian: Divisi Dua Liga Indonesia 2012) is the seventeenth edition of Liga Indonesia Second Division. The competition is organized by the Indonesia Amateur Football League Board (BLAI) of the PSSI breakaway leadership under La Nyalla Matalatti.

== Participants ==
=== Relegated clubs from First Division ===
- PSAB Aceh Besar
- Persibabar Bangka Barat
- Persebsi Sibolga
- Persika Karawang
- Persikad Depok
- Persibat Batang
- Penggung Raya
- Persada Kragilan
- Timas Kebontimun
- Sparta Cepogo
- Persesa Salakan
- Persekaba Blora
- Persiko Kotabaru
- Persista Sintang
- Persikos Sorong
- Persikota Tidore
- Persitoli Tolikara

=== Promoted clubs from Third Division ===
- Persibolmut North Bolaang Mongondow
- PS Dafi Mulia
- Bintang Jaya Asahan
- PS TGM Medan
- Persekabpur Purworejo
- Maung Bandung
- Martapura
- Persekat Katingan
- Perseden Denpasar
- PSK Kupang
- Persipuja Puncak Jaya
- Nusaina
- Villa 2000
- PS Batam
- Gresik Putra
- MBU Sidoarjo

== First stage ==
Key to colours in group tables
Top two placed teams advance to the 2nd Round
Bottom placed teams relegated to the Second Division

Group Winner and runner-up qualify for 2nd round.

Group 1
Pos	Team	Pld	W	D	L	GF	GA	GD	Pts
1	Lhokseumawe	0	0	0	0	0	0	0	0
2	Persibamer Bener Meriah	0	0	0	0	0	0	0	0
3	Persijaya Aceh Jaya	0	0	0	0	0	0	0	0
4	Persip Pasee	0	0	0	0	0	0	0	0
5	Persada Southwest Aceh	0	0	0	0	0	0	0	0
6	PS Peureulak Raya	0	0	0	0	0	0	0	0

Group 2
Pos	Team	Pld	W	D	L	GF	GA	GD	Pts
1	Perskas Subussalam	0	0	0	0	0	0	0	0
2	Persebsi Sibolga	0	0	0	0	0	0	0	0
3	PS Kwarta Medan	0	0	0	0	0	0	0	0
4	PSSD Dairi	0	0	0	0	0	0	0	0
5	PS Sergai	0	0	0	0	0	0	0	0

Group 3
Pos	Team	Pld	W	D	L	GF	GA	GD	Pts
1	PS Siak	0	0	0	0	0	0	0	0
2	Persiks Kuantan Singingi	0	0	0	0	0	0	0	0
3	Persiju Sijunjung	0	0	0	0	0	0	0	0
4	PS Pasbar	0	0	0	0	0	0	0	0
5	PS Bungo	0	0	0	0	0	0	0	0
6	Persibabar West Bangka	0	0	0	0	0	0	0	0

Group 4
Pos	Team	Pld	W	D	L	GF	GA	GD	Pts
1	PS Pelalawan	0	0	0	0	0	0	0	0
2	Persikalis Bengkalis	0	0	0	0	0	0	0	0
3	Bintang Jaya Asahan	0	0	0	0	0	0	0	0
4	PSTS Tanjungbalai	0	0	0	0	0	0	0	0
5	PS TGM Medan	0	0	0	0	0	0	0	0

Group 5
Pos	Team	Pld	W	D	L	GF	GA	GD	Pts
1	Persibas Banyumas	0	0	0	0	0	0	0	0
2	Persibangga Purbalingga	0	0	0	0	0	0	0	0
3	PSB Bogor	0	0	0	0	0	0	0	0
4	Pesik Kuningan	0	0	0	0	0	0	0	0
5	Persika Karawang	0	0	0	0	0	0	0	0
6	PSGC Ciamis	0	0	0	0	0	0	0	0
7	Penggung Raya	0	0	0	0	0	0	0	0

Group 6
Pos	Team	Pld	W	D	L	GF	GA	GD	Pts
1	Persipur Purwodadi	10	5	3	2	0	0	0	18
2	Persik Kendal	10	4	5	1	0	0	0	17
3	Persebi Boyolali	10	3	4	3	0	0	0	13
4	Persikaba Blora	10	3	3	4	0	0	0	12
5	PSISra Sragen	10	3	2	5	0	0	0	11
6	Persipa Pati	10	2	3	5	0	0	0	9

Group 7
Pos	Team	Pld	W	D	L	GF	GA	GD	Pts
1	Persekabpas Pasuruan	0	0	0	0	0	0	0	0
2	Persikoba Batu	0	0	0	0	0	0	0	0
3	Persenga Nganjuk	0	0	0	0	0	0	0	0
4	Perseta Tulungagung	0	0	0	0	0	0	0	0
5	Persida Sidoarjo	0	0	0	0	0	0	0	0
6	Persedikab Kediri	0	0	0	0	0	0	0	0

Group 8
Pos	Team	Pld	W	D	L	GF	GA	GD	Pts
1	Persekap Pasuruan	0	0	0	0	0	0	0	0
2	Perseba Super	0	0	0	0	0	0	0	0
3	PSID Jombang	0	0	0	0	0	0	0	0
4	PSKB Sumbawa	0	0	0	0	0	0	0	0
5	Persebi Bima	0	0	0	0	0	0	0	0

Group 9
Pos	Team	Pld	W	D	L	GF	GA	GD	Pts
1	Persikutim East Kutai	0	0	0	0	0	0	0	0
2	Persipon Pontianak	0	0	0	0	0	0	0	0
3	Persikubar West Kutai	0	0	0	0	0	0	0	0
4	Persista Sintang	0	0	0	0	0	0	0	0
5	PS Kab. Tapin	0	0	0	0	0	0	0	0

Group 10
Pos	Team	Pld	W	D	L	GF	GA	GD	Pts
1	Persipal Palu	0	0	0	0	0	0	0	0
2	PSKT Tomohon	0	0	0	0	0	0	0	0
3	Persipas Paser	0	0	0	0	0	0	0	0
4	PS Penajam Paser Utara	0	0	0	0	0	0	0	0

Group 11
Pos	Team	Pld	W	D	L	GF	GA	GD	Pts
1	Persiss Sorong	0	0	0	0	0	0	0	0
2	Persikos Sorong	0	0	0	0	0	0	0	0
3	Perseka Kaimana	0	0	0	0	0	0	0	0
4	Persifa Fakfak	0	0	0	0	0	0	0	0
5	Persewon Wondama Bay	0	0	0	0	0	0	0	0

Group 12
Pos	Team	Pld	W	D	L	GF	GA	GD	Pts
1	Yahukimo	0	0	0	0	0	0	0	0
2	Persias Asmat	0	0	0	0	0	0	0	0
3	Persipani Paniai	0	0	0	0	0	0	0	0
4	Persewar Waropen	0	0	0	0	0	0	0	0
5	Persigubin Bintang Mountains	0	0	0	0	0	0	0	0
