= 2014 Liga Indonesia First Division =

Liga Indonesia First Division
- Season: 2014
- Champions: Cilegon United (1st title)
- Promoted: Cilegon United; Persibat Batang

The 2014 Liga Indonesia First Division season is the last (19th) edition of Liga Indonesia First Division before the league merged with the Liga Nusantara on 2015 season. After removal of Badan Liga Sepakbola Amatir Indonesia (BLAI) First Division this season is managed by PSSI competition committee and further delegated to the PT. Liga Indonesia (LI).

PS Kwarta Deli Serdang is the last season champion.

The competition starts on 29 April 2014 and finish by 28 September 2014.

Cilegon United became champion after beating Persibat Batang in the final.

== Format ==
As with previous seasons, the competition system used in the First Division this season is a home tournament with a round robin format. League is divided into three groups stage and knock-out round. In the first stage of the club is divided into 12 groups, group winner and runner-up advances to second stage. While the second stage is divided into four groups of six, the winner and runner-up of each group advances to third stage. In the third round the eight teams that qualify from the second round were divided into two groups of four, while the knockout consist of semi-finals and finals as well as the third place playoff. The champions and runner-up will promotion to 2015 Premier Division season

For regulatory and competition manual, still waiting for the discussion to be carried out when the managers meeting on 12 April 2014. Implementation of the 2014 First Division competition will be divided in five innings; the first round, second round, third round, fourth round, and Final. The timing of the competition will spend about five months since the end of April to September.

Both teams were finalists or champions and runners-up First Division competition will get a promotion to the Premier Division for the 2015 season. While the club was ranked three, four, five and six, or who are appearing in the fourth round are entitled to appear at the national level Piala Nusantara (Liga Nusantara) in 2014 as promotion play-off to the Premier Division next year.

== Teams ==
This season there were 73 First Division club participants. A total of 66 clubs participating in amateur competitions ensure First Division. Certainty is obtained in 66 club forums Managers Meeting held in Jakarta and Surabaya, 12 to 13 April 2014.

The 66 clubs were divided into 12 groups based on consideration of the geographic aspects, and agreed to roll out its kick-off on 29 April.

PS Kwarta Deli Serdang (champion), Persinga Ngawi (runner-up), Bintang Jaya Asahan, Martapura FC, Persigubin Gunung Bintang, Villa 2000, PSGC Ciamis and Persida Sidoarjo promotion to the Premier Division this season after finishing in the top eight First Division last season.

PSPP Padang Panjang and Persipal Palu were relegated to the Liga Nusantara this season due to withdrawal before the First Division last season started.

Persenga Nganjuk and Persifa Fak-fak did not participate in the First Division this season because of the team they become participants Premier Division this season after last season also featured in the Premier Division LPIS.

PSGL Gayo Lues and PSAB Aceh Besar were relegated from the Premier Division due to withdrawal before the Premier Division last season started.

Persipas Paser participated in First Division after the disqualification of the Premier Division last season because of financial problems.

Perssin Sinjai, PSSB Bireuen and Persemalra Maluku Tenggara participated in First Division after not pass the verification participated Premier Division this season.

Cilegon United (champion), Jember United (runner-up), TGM Medan, Rumbai FC, Persilat Central Lampung, U.N.I Bandung, PS Badung, Persesa Sampang, Bontang Mitra United, PSN Nunukan, Persitoli Tolikara and Persiyali Yalimo promotion from Second Division after finishing in the top twelve last season.

== First round ==
In this stage 73 teams divided into twelve group of six/seven, this round will begin on April 29 and ended on 8 June 2014.

=== Group A ===
All matches played in Blangkejeren and Sigli, Aceh.

Pos	Team	Pld	W	D	L	GF	GA	GD	Pts	Qualification or relegation
1	Pidie Jaya	7	4	2	1	13	8	+5	14	Advances to Second round
2	PSGL Gayo Lues	7	4	2	1	17	8	+9	14	Advances to Second round
3	Persidi Idi Rayeuk	7	2	4	1	9	7	+2	10	Relegation to 2015 Liga Nusantara
4	North Aceh	7	0	3	4	6	15	−9	3	Relegation to 2015 Liga Nusantara
5	Persal South Aceh	4	0	1	3	1	8	−7	1	Relegation to 2015 Liga Nusantara
6	PSAB Aceh Besar	0	0	0	0	0	0	0	0	Relegation to 2015 Liga Nusantara

Updated to match(es) played on 31 May 2014. Source: 2014 First Division table
Rules for classification: 1) points; 2) goal difference; 3) number of goals scored.

=== Group B ===
All matches played in Siak Sri Indrapura, Riau.

Pos	Team	Pld	W	D	L	GF	GA	GD	Pts	Qualification or relegation
1	Siak	7	4	2	1	18	10	+8	14	Advances to Second round
2	TGM Medan	7	4	1	2	20	7	+13	13	Advances to Second round
3	Medan Jaya	7	4	1	2	14	11	+3	13	Relegation to 2015 Liga Nusantara
4	PSTS Tanjung Balai	4	1	2	1	4	5	−1	5	Relegation to 2015 Liga Nusantara
5	Medan United	7	0	0	7	6	29	−23	0	Relegation to 2015 Liga Nusantara
6	PSSA Asahan	0	0	0	0	0	0	0	0	Relegation to 2015 Liga Nusantara

Updated to match(es) played on 30 May 2014. Source: 2014 First Division table
Rules for classification: 1) points; 2) goal difference; 3) number of goals scored.

=== Group C ===
All matches played in Padang, West Sumatra and Kuantan Singingi Regency, Riau.

Pos	Team	Pld	W	D	L	GF	GA	GD	Pts	Qualification or relegation
1	Persiks KuanSing	7	4	3	0	10	4	+6	15	Advances to Second round
2	PSP Padang	7	4	2	1	16	9	+7	14	Advances to Second round
3	Persepak Payakumbuh	7	3	2	2	13	12	+1	11	Relegation to 2015 Liga Nusantara
4	Rumbai	7	1	1	5	4	12	−8	4	Relegation to 2015 Liga Nusantara
5	West Pasaman	4	0	0	4	3	9	−6	0	Relegation to 2015 Liga Nusantara
6	Persiju Sijunjung	0	0	0	0	0	0	0	0	Relegation to 2015 Liga Nusantara

Updated to match(es) played on 31 May 2014. Source: 2014 First Division table
Rules for classification: 1) points; 2) goal difference; 3) number of goals scored.

=== Group D ===
All matches played in Bandar Lampung, Lampung and East Jakarta, Jakarta.

Pos	Team	Pld	W	D	L	GF	GA	GD	Pts	Qualification
1	Cilegon United	5	4	1	0	14	2	+12	13	Advances to Second round
2	PSBL Bandar Lampung	5	3	1	1	8	6	+2	10	Advances to Second round
3	Persilat Central Lampung	5	1	0	4	2	12	−10	3	Relegation to 2015 Liga Nusantara
4	Persibabar West Bangka	3	0	0	3	0	4	−4	0	Relegation to 2015 Liga Nusantara
5	Bungo	0	0	0	0	0	0	0	0	Relegation to 2015 Liga Nusantara
6	PLN Jambi	0	0	0	0	0	0	0	0	Relegation to 2015 Liga Nusantara

Updated to match(es) played on 5 June 2014. Source: 2014 First Division table
Rules for classification: 1) points; 2) goal difference; 3) number of goals scored.

=== Group E ===
All matches played in Bogor, West Java and Cilegon, Banten.

Pos	Team	Pld	W	D	L	GF	GA	GD	Pts	Qualification or relegation
1	Perserang	10	6	3	1	19	4	+15	21	Advances to Second round
2	Persikasi Bekasi	10	3	6	1	7	4	+3	15	Advances to Second round
3	PSB Bogor	10	3	4	3	9	10	−1	13	Relegation to 2015 Liga Nusantara
4	Persikota Tangerang	10	2	6	2	11	9	+2	12	Relegation to 2015 Liga Nusantara
5	Matador FC	10	3	3	4	12	13	−1	12	Relegation to 2015 Liga Nusantara
6	East Jakarta	10	1	2	7	5	23	−18	5	Relegation to 2015 Liga Nusantara
7	Tapin	0	0	0	0	0	0	0	0	Relegation to 2015 Liga Nusantara

Updated to match(es) played on 8 June 2014. Source: 2014 First Division table
Rules for classification: 1) points; 2) goal difference; 3) number of goals scored.

=== Group F ===
All matches played in Batang Regency, Central Java and Kuningan Regency, West Java.

Pos	Team	Pld	W	D	L	GF	GA	GD	Pts	Qualification or relegation
1	Persibat	6	6	0	0	15	0	+15	18	Advances to Second round
2	UNI Bandung	6	3	0	3	4	6	−2	9	Advances to Second round
3	Pesik Kuningan	6	2	0	4	5	12	−7	6	Relegation to 2015 Liga Nusantara
4	Maung Bandung	6	1	0	5	3	9	−6	3	Relegation to 2015 Liga Nusantara
5	Persekap Pekalongan	0	0	0	0	0	0	0	0	Relegation to 2015 Liga Nusantara
6	Persista Sintang	0	0	0	0	0	0	0	0	Relegation to 2015 Liga Nusantara

Updated to match(es) played on 31 May 2014. Source: 2014 First Division table
Rules for classification: 1) points; 2) goal difference; 3) number of goals scored.

=== Group G ===
All matches played in Banyumas Regency and Kendal Regency, Central Java.

Pos	Team	Pld	W	D	L	GF	GA	GD	Pts	Qualification or relegation
1	Persik Kendal	8	5	2	1	9	5	+4	17	Advances to Second round
2	Persibas Banyumas	8	5	1	2	11	7	+4	16	Advances to Second round
3	PSISra Sragen	8	4	0	4	9	5	+4	12	Relegation to 2015 Liga Nusantara
4	Persebi Boyolali	8	2	2	4	6	9	−3	8	Relegation to 2015 Liga Nusantara
5	Persipa Pati	8	1	1	6	7	16	−9	4	Relegation to 2015 Liga Nusantara
6	ISP Purworejo	0	0	0	0	0	0	0	0	Relegation to 2015 Liga Nusantara
7	Tunas Jogja	0	0	0	0	0	0	0	0	Relegation to 2015 Liga Nusantara

Updated to match(es) played on 5 June 2014. Source: 2014 First Division table
Rules for classification: 1) points; 2) goal difference; 3) number of goals scored.

=== Group H ===
All matches played in Tuban Regency and Pasuruan Regency, East Java.

Pos	Team	Pld	W	D	L	GF	GA	GD	Pts	Qualification or relegation
1	Persatu Tuban	10	7	2	1	21	8	+13	23	Advances to Second round
2	Persekabpas Pasuruan	10	5	2	3	19	18	+1	17	Advances to Second round
3	Persikoba Batu	10	4	3	3	14	12	+2	15	Relegation to 2015 Liga Nusantara
4	Surabaya Muda	10	4	3	3	17	14	+3	15	Relegation to 2015 Liga Nusantara
5	Persesa Sampang	10	2	2	6	9	16	−7	8	Relegation to 2015 Liga Nusantara
6	Persisum Sumbawa	10	1	2	7	12	24	−12	5	Relegation to 2015 Liga Nusantara

Updated to match(es) played on 8 June 2014. Source: 2014 First Division table
Rules for classification: 1) points; 2) goal difference; 3) number of goals scored.

=== Group I ===
All matches played in Lumajang Regency, East Java and Badung Regency, Bali.

Pos	Team	Pld	W	D	L	GF	GA	GD	Pts	Qualification or relegation
1	PS Badung	10	7	2	1	19	7	+12	23	Advances to Second round
2	Perseden Denpasar	10	7	1	2	21	4	+17	22	Advances to Second round
3	PSIL Lumajang	10	6	3	1	14	4	+10	21	Relegation to 2015 Liga Nusantara
4	Jember United	10	3	1	6	11	19	−8	10	Relegation to 2015 Liga Nusantara
5	Persikapro Probolinggo	10	1	4	5	5	16	−11	7	Relegation to 2015 Liga Nusantara
6	PSID Jombang	10	0	1	9	6	26	−20	1	Relegation to 2015 Liga Nusantara

Updated to match(es) played on 6 June 2014. Source: 2014 First Division table
Rules for classification: 1) points; 2) goal difference; 3) number of goals scored.

=== Group J ===
All matches played in Bontang and East Kutai Regency, East Kalimantan.

Pos	Team	Pld	W	D	L	GF	GA	GD	Pts	Qualification or relegation
1	Persikutim East Kutai	8	6	2	0	18	8	+10	20	Advances to Second round
2	North Penajam Paser	8	2	4	2	6	5	+1	10	Advances to Second round
3	Persekap Kapuas	8	2	2	4	4	11	−7	8	Relegation to 2015 Liga Nusantara
4	BM United	8	1	4	3	9	9	0	7	Relegation to 2015 Liga Nusantara
5	Bontang FC	8	1	4	3	7	11	−4	7	Relegation to 2015 Liga Nusantara
6	Persipas Paser	0	0	0	0	0	0	0	0	Relegation to 2015 Liga Nusantara
7	PSN Nunukan	0	0	0	0	0	0	0	0	Relegation to 2015 Liga Nusantara

Updated to match(es) played on 12 April 2014. Source: 2014 First Division table
Rules for classification: 1) points; 2) goal difference; 3) number of goals scored.

=== Group K ===
All matches played in Ternate, North Maluku and Nabire, West Papua.

Pos	Team	Pld	W	D	L	GF	GA	GD	Pts	Qualification or relegation
1	Persisos South Sorong	0	0	0	0	0	0	0	0	Advances to Second round
2	Persikos Sorong	0	0	0	0	0	0	0	0	Advances to Second round
3	Nusa Ina	0	0	0	0	0	0	0	0	Relegation to 2015 Liga Nusantara
4	Persinab Nabire	0	0	0	0	0	0	0	0	Relegation to 2015 Liga Nusantara
5	PSKT Tomohon	0	0	0	0	0	0	0	0	Relegation to 2015 Liga Nusantara

Updated to match(es) played on 30 May 2014. Source: 2014 First Division table
Rules for classification: 1) points; 2) goal difference; 3) number of goals scored.

=== Group L ===
All matches played in Papua.

Pos	Team	Pld	W	D	L	GF	GA	GD	Pts	Qualification or relegation
1	Persipani Paniai	0	0	0	0	0	0	0	0	Advances to Second round
2	Persiyali Yalimo	0	0	0	0	0	0	0	0	Advances to Second round
3	Persewar Waropen	0	0	0	0	0	0	0	0	Relegation to 2015 Liga Nusantara
4	Persitoli Tolikara	0	0	0	0	0	0	0	0	Relegation to 2015 Liga Nusantara
5	Persias Asmat	0	0	0	0	0	0	0	0	Relegation to 2015 Liga Nusantara

Updated to match(es) played on 30 May 2014. Source: 2014 First Division table
Rules for classification: 1) points; 2) goal difference; 3) number of goals scored.

== Second round ==
In this stage 24 teams divided into six group of four. This round will begin on June 16 and ended on June 24, 2014.

=== Group M ===
All matches played in Blangkejeren, Aceh.

Pos	Team	Pld	W	D	L	GF	GA	GD	Pts	Qualification or relegation
1	Pidie Jaya	3	2	1	0	5	2	+3	7	Advances to Third round
2	PSGL Gayo Lues	3	1	2	0	7	2	+5	5	Advances to Third round
3	TGM Medan	3	0	2	1	3	5	−2	2	Relegation to 2015 Liga Nusantara
4	Siak	3	0	1	2	1	7	−6	1	Relegation to 2015 Liga Nusantara

Updated to match(es) played on 24 June 2014. Source: First Division table
Rules for classification: 1) points; 2) goal difference; 3) number of goals scored.

=== Group N ===
All matches played in Cilegon, Banten.

Pos	Team	Pld	W	D	L	GF	GA	GD	Pts	Qualification or relegation
1	Cilegon United	3	3	0	0	10	1	+9	9	Advances to Third round
2	PSP Padang	3	2	0	1	2	4	−2	6	Advances to Third round
3	PSBL Bandar Lampung	3	1	0	2	3	3	0	3	Relegation to 2015 Liga Nusantara
4	Persiks KuanSing	3	0	0	3	0	7	−7	0	Relegation to 2015 Liga Nusantara

Updated to match(es) played on 24 June 2014. Source: First Division table
Rules for classification: 1) points; 2) goal difference; 3) number of goals scored.

=== Group O ===
All matches played in Batang Regency, Central Java.

Pos	Team	Pld	W	D	L	GF	GA	GD	Pts	Qualification or relegation
1	Persibat	3	2	1	0	3	0	+3	7	Advances to Third round
2	Perserang	3	1	1	1	2	2	0	4	Advances to Third round
3	UNI Bandung	3	1	1	1	3	2	+1	4	Relegation to 2015 Liga Nusantara
4	Persikasi Bekasi	3	0	1	2	2	6	−4	1	Relegation to 2015 Liga Nusantara

Updated to match(es) played on 24 June 2014. Source: First Division table
Rules for classification: 1) points; 2) goal difference; 3) number of goals scored.

=== Group P ===
All matches played in Tuban Regency, East Java.

Pos	Team	Pld	W	D	L	GF	GA	GD	Pts	Qualification or relegation
1	Persatu Tuban	3	3	0	0	6	0	+6	9	Advances to Third round
2	Persibas Banyumas	3	2	0	1	3	2	+1	6	Advances to Third round
3	Persekabpas Pasuruan	3	1	0	2	2	4	−2	3	Relegation to 2015 Liga Nusantara
4	Persik Kendal	3	0	0	3	1	6	−5	0	Relegation to 2015 Liga Nusantara

Updated to match(es) played on 24 June 2014. Source: First Division table
Rules for classification: 1) points; 2) goal difference; 3) number of goals scored.

=== Group Q ===
All matches played in Badung Regency, Bali.

Pos	Team	Pld	W	D	L	GF	GA	GD	Pts	Qualification or relegation
1	Perseden Denpasar	3	2	1	0	5	1	+4	7	Advances to Third round
2	PS Badung	3	2	1	0	4	0	+4	7	Advances to Third round
3	Persikutim East Kutai	3	1	0	2	3	5	−2	3	Relegation to 2015 Liga Nusantara
4	North Penajam Paser	3	0	0	3	0	6	−6	0	Relegation to 2015 Liga Nusantara

Updated to match(es) played on 24 June 2014. Source: First Division table
Rules for classification: 1) points; 2) goal difference; 3) number of goals scored.

=== Group R ===
All matches played in Jayapura, Papua.

Pos	Team	Pld	W	D	L	GF	GA	GD	Pts	Qualification or relegation
1	Persipani Paniai	3	2	1	0	8	1	+7	7	Advances to Third round
2	Persikos Sorong	3	1	2	0	4	3	+1	5	Advances to Third round
3	Persisos South Sorong	2	0	1	1	1	7	−6	1	Relegation to 2015 Liga Nusantara
4	Persiyali Yalimo	2	0	0	2	1	3	−2	0	Relegation to 2015 Liga Nusantara

Updated to match(es) played on 24 June 2014. Source: First Division table
Rules for classification: 1) points; 2) goal difference; 3) number of goals scored.

== Third round ==
In this stage 12 teams divided into three group of four. This round will begin on 30 August until 3 September 2014.

=== Group S ===
Pos	Team	Pld	W	D	L	GF	GA	GD	Pts	Qualification or relegation
1	Cilegon United	3	3	0	0	10	2	+8	9	Advances to Fourth round
2	PS Badung	3	2	0	1	9	5	+4	6	Advances to Fourth round
3	Pidie Jaya	3	1	0	2	4	7	−3	3	Relegation to 2015 Liga Nusantara
4	Persikos Sorong	3	0	0	3	1	10	−9	0	Relegation to 2015 Liga Nusantara

Updated to match(es) played on 3 September 2014. Source:
Rules for classification: 1) points; 2) goal difference; 3) number of goals scored.

=== Group T ===
Pos	Team	Pld	W	D	L	GF	GA	GD	Pts	Qualification or relegation
1	Persibat	3	3	0	0	8	2	+6	9	Advances to Fourth round
2	Persatu Tuban	3	2	0	1	7	4	+3	6	Advances to Fourth round
3	PSP Padang	3	1	0	2	3	4	−1	3	Relegation to 2015 Liga Nusantara
4	PSGL Gayo Lues	3	0	0	3	0	8	−8	0	Relegation to 2015 Liga Nusantara

Updated to match(es) played on 3 September 2014. Source:
Rules for classification: 1) points; 2) goal difference; 3) number of goals scored.

=== Group U ===
Pos	Team	Pld	W	D	L	GF	GA	GD	Pts	Qualification or relegation
1	Perserang	3	1	2	0	3	2	+1	5	Advances to Fourth round
2	Persibas Banyumas	3	1	2	0	2	1	+1	5	Advances to Fourth round
3	Perseden Denpasar	3	1	0	2	2	3	−1	3	Relegation to 2015 Liga Nusantara
4	Persipani Paniai	3	0	2	1	2	3	−1	2	Relegation to 2015 Liga Nusantara

Updated to match(es) played on 3 September 2014. Source:
Rules for classification: 1) points; 2) goal difference; 3) number of goals scored.

== Fourth round ==
In this stage 6 teams divided into two group of three. This round began on 8 September 2014 and ended on 12 September 2014.

=== Group V ===
Pos	Team	Pld	W	D	L	GF	GA	GD	Pts	Qualification
1	Persibat	2	2	0	0	5	0	+5	6	Advances to Final
2	PS Badung	2	0	1	1	1	2	−1	1	Promotion play-off in 2014 Liga Nusantara
3	Perserang	2	0	1	1	1	5	−4	1	Promotion play-off in 2014 Liga Nusantara

Updated to match(es) played on 12 September 2014. Source:
Rules for classification: 1) points; 2) goal difference; 3) number of goals scored.

=== Group W ===
Pos	Team	Pld	W	D	L	GF	GA	GD	Pts	Qualification
1	Cilegon United	2	1	1	0	2	1	+1	4	Advances to Final
2	Persatu Tuban	2	1	0	1	1	1	0	3	Promotion play-off in 2014 Liga Nusantara
3	Persibas Banyumas	2	0	1	1	1	2	−1	1	Promotion play-off in 2014 Liga Nusantara

Updated to match(es) played on 12 September 2014. Source:
Rules for classification: 1) points; 2) goal difference; 3) number of goals scored.

== Final ==
The format for this round will be determined at the time of the manager meeting. The winner of each group in the fourth round will compete in the Final. Cilegon United became the champion.

Minggu, 28 September 2014
15:00 WIB

Cilegon United	1 – 1	Persibat Batang
Dado 19'	Report	Habidin 13'
Penalties
Dado (penalty scored); Rinto Ali (penalty scored); Ricko (penalty scored)	3 – 0	(penalty missed) Habidin; (penalty missed) Dani; (penalty missed) Ahmad

Krakatau Steel Stadium, Cilegon

First Division 2014 champions
Cilegon United
