= 2012 Liga Amatir Indonesia Second Division =

Liga Amatir Indonesia Second Division
- Season: 2011–12
- Champions: Nusaina
- Promoted: Nusaina; Persinga Ngawi; Perseden Denpasar; PS Bintang Jaya Asahan; Persibat Batang; Surabaya Muda; Persisos South Sorong; Persekabpur Purworejo; Serang Jaya; PSIL Lumajang; Persatu Tuban; PS Kwarta; Perskas Subulussalam; PS TGM Medan; PS PU Bontang; Persikol Kolonodale

The 2012 Liga Indonesia Second Division season (Indonesian: Divisi Dua Liga Indonesia 2012) is the seventeenth edition of Liga Indonesia Second Division. The competition is organized by the PSSI leadership under Djohar Arifin Husein. The competition called with name Liga Amatir Indonesia Second Division.

== First round ==
Key to colours in group tables
Top two placed teams advance to the second round
Bottom placed teams relegated to the Second Division

In this round, 100 clubs qualify/eligible to compete were divided into 20 groups. This stage started on 14 January 2012. Group winner and runner-up qualify for second round.

Group I:

All games held at the Langsa Stadium, Langsa.

All times are West Indonesia Time (UTC+7).

Pos	Team	Pld	W	D	L	GF	GA	GD	Pts
1	PS Peureulak Raya	5	4	1	0	11	3	+8	13
2	Persip Pasee	5	4	1	0	8	4	+4	13
3	Lhokseumawe	5	2	1	2	7	6	+1	7
4	Persijaya Aceh Jaya	5	1	1	3	3	7	−4	4
5	Persada Southwest Aceh	5	1	0	4	6	9	−3	3
6	Persibamer Bener Meriah	5	1	0	4	5	11	−6	3

Group II:

All games held at the T.D. Pardede Stadium, Medan.

All times are West Indonesia Time (UTC+7).

Pos	Team	Pld	W	D	L	GF	GA	GD	Pts
1	PS Kwarta	6	3	2	1	7	3	+4	11
2	Perskas Subulussalam	6	2	4	0	4	2	+2	10
3	PS Sergai	6	1	2	3	6	9	−3	5
4	PSSD Dairi	6	1	2	3	4	7	−3	5
5	Persebsi Sibolga (W)	0	–	–	–	–	–	—	0

(W) Withdrew

Group III:

All games held at the Pancasila Stadium, Kerinci Regency.

All times are West Indonesia Time (UTC+7).

Pos	Team	Pld	W	D	L	GF	GA	GD	Pts
1	PSKB Bukittinggi	5	2	3	0	10	6	+4	9
2	Persis Solok	5	2	1	2	9	10	−1	7
3	PS Kerinci	5	1	2	2	6	7	−1	5
4	Persepak Payakumbuh	5	0	4	1	5	7	−2	4
5	PS GAS Sawahlunto (W)	0	–	–	–	–	–	—	0

(W) Withdrew

Group IV:

All games held at the Mutiara Kisaran Stadium, Asahan Regency and TGM Helvetia Field, Medan.

All times are West Indonesia Time (UTC+7).

Pos	Team	Pld	W	D	L	GF	GA	GD	Pts
1	PS TGM Medan	4	3	0	1	8	2	+6	9
2	PS Bintang Jaya Asahan	4	2	1	1	4	2	+2	7
3	PSTS Tanjungbalai	4	0	1	3	2	9	−7	1
4	Persikalis Bengkalis (W)	0	–	–	–	–	–	—	0
5	PS Pelalawan (W)	0	–	–	–	–	–	—	0

(W) Withdrew

Group V:

PS Batam qualify for next stage after all of competitor is withdrew.

Pos	Team	Pld	W	D	L	GF	GA	GD	Pts
1	PS Batam	0	–	–	–	–	–	—	0
2	PS Markuban (W)	0	–	–	–	–	–	—	0
3	PSBS Bangkinang (W)	0	–	–	–	–	–	—	0
4	PSIB Bengkalis (W)	0	–	–	–	–	–	—	0
5	Persisko Bangko (W)	0	–	–	–	–	–	—	0

(W) Withdrew

Group VI:

All games held at the KONI Batanghari Stadium, Batanghari and Tri Lomba Juang Stadium, Jambi City.

All times are West Indonesia Time (UTC+7).

Pos	Team	Pld	W	D	L	GF	GA	GD	Pts
1	Persibri Batanghari	4	4	0	0	9	0	+9	12
2	PS Merangin	4	1	0	3	4	4	0	3
3	PS Banyuasin	4	0	1	3	1	10	−9	1
4	PS Bank Sumsel (W)	0	–	–	–	–	–	—	0
5	PS PLN Jambi (W)	0	–	–	–	–	–	—	0
6	PS Bengkulu Putra (W)	0	–	–	–	–	–	—	0

(W) Withdrew

Group VII:

All games held at the Maulana Yusuf Stadium, Serang.

All times are West Indonesia Time (UTC+7).

Pos	Team	Pld	W	D	L	GF	GA	GD	Pts
1	Serang Jaya	4	4	0	0	10	3	+7	12
2	Bintang Kranggan	4	2	0	2	10	6	+4	6
3	Persija Barat	4	0	0	4	1	12	−11	0
4	PSJS South Jakarta (W)	0	–	–	–	–	–	—	0
5	Villa 2000 (W)	0	–	–	–	–	–	—	0
6	PSKS Cilegon (W)	0	–	–	–	–	–	—	0

(W) Withdrew

Group VIII:

All games held at the Purnawarman Stadium, Purwakarta and Suryakencana Stadium, Sukabumi.

All times are West Indonesia Time (UTC+7).

Pos	Team	Pld	W	D	L	GF	GA	GD	Pts
1	Persigar Garut	8	4	3	1	12	4	+8	15
2	Perssi Sukabumi	8	3	4	1	7	4	+3	13
3	Persipo Purwakarta	8	3	2	3	10	9	+1	11
4	PSGJ Cirebon	8	3	1	4	8	12	−4	10
5	Persikotas Tasikmalaya	7	1	2	4	6	14	−8	5
6	Maung Bandung (W)	0	–	–	–	–	–	—	0

(W) Withdrew

Group IX:

All games held homeaway roundrobin system.

All times are West Indonesia Time (UTC+7).

Pos	Team	Pld	W	D	L	GF	GA	GD	Pts
1	Persibat Batang	8	6	2	0	18	3	+15	20
2	Persekabpur Purworejo	8	4	2	2	12	7	+5	14
3	Persekap Pekalongan	8	3	2	3	12	11	+1	11
4	Persitas Tasikmalaya	8	2	1	5	5	7	−2	7
5	Persikoban Banjar	8	1	1	6	4	23	−19	4

Group X:

All games held with homeaway roundrobin system.

All times are West Indonesia Time (UTC+7).

Pos	Team	Pld	W	D	L	GF	GA	GD	Pts
1	Persinga Ngawi	8	6	2	0	10	0	+10	20
2	PSISa Salatiga	8	4	1	3	12	10	+2	13
3	Tunas Jogja	8	3	2	3	9	8	+1	11
4	Protaba Bantul	8	2	2	4	6	12	−6	8
5	Persika Karanganyar	8	1	1	6	9	16	−7	4

Group XI:

All games held at the Semeru Stadium, Lumajang and Lokajaya Stadium, Tuban.

All times are West Indonesia Time (UTC+7).

Pos	Team	Pld	W	D	L	GF	GA	GD	Pts
1	Persatu Tuban	6	5	0	1	20	1	+19	15
2	PSIL Lumajang	6	4	1	1	14	4	+10	13
3	Persekama Madiun	5	0	1	4	2	19	−17	−2 (Note: Persesa Sampang and Persekama Madiun declared lost walkout and minus 3 points.)
4	Persesa Sampang	5	0	0	5	0	18	−18	−3
5	MBU Sidoarjo (W)	0	–	–	–	–	–	—	0
6	Gresik Putra (W)	0	–	–	–	–	–	—	0

(W) Withdrew
Notes:

Group XII:

All games held at the Ngurah Rai Stadium, Denpasar and Gelora 10 November Stadium, Surabaya.

All times are Central Indonesia Time (UTC+8) and West Indonesia Time (UTC+7).

Pos	Team	Pld	W	D	L	GF	GA	GD	Pts
1	Surabaya Muda	4	3	1	0	11	3	+8	10
2	Perseden Denpasar	4	2	1	1	5	3	+2	7
3	Perst Tabanan	4	0	0	4	1	11	−10	0
4	Persebo Bondowoso (W)	0	–	–	–	–	–	—	0
5	Persikapro Probolinggo (W)	0	–	–	–	–	–	—	0

(W) Withdrew

Group XIII:

All games held at the GOR 17 December Stadium, Kendari.

All times are Central Indonesia Time (UTC+8).

Pos	Team	Pld	W	D	L	GF	GA	GD	Pts
1	Perseftim East Flores	7	4	3	0	21	4	+17	15
2	Persap Alor Pantar	7	4	3	0	17	5	+12	15
3	PS Mataram	7	1	4	2	6	7	−1	7
4	PSK Kupang	7	2	1	4	3	9	−6	7
5	Perslotim East Lombok	8	1	1	6	5	27	−22	4

Group XIV:

All games held at the Tuah Pahoe Stadium, Palangkaraya.

All times are Central Indonesia Time (UTC+8).

Pos	Team	Pld	W	D	L	GF	GA	GD	Pts
1	Persekat Katingan	6	4	1	1	13	6	+7	13
2	PS PU Putra Palangka Raya	6	4	0	2	11	7	+4	12
3	PS Kubu Raya	5	2	1	2	7	4	+3	7
4	Persekap Kapuas	5	0	0	5	4	18	−14	0

Group XV:

Outcome unknown.

Pos	Team	Pld	W	D	L	GF	GA	GD	Pts
1	Persiko Kotabaru	0	–	–	–	–	–	—	0
2	Persehan Marabahan	0	–	–	–	–	–	—	0
3	Martapura	0	–	–	–	–	–	—	0
4	Persetala Tanah Laut	0	–	–	–	–	–	—	0

Group XVI:

All games held at the Bontang Stadium, Bontang.

All times are Central Indonesia Time (UTC+8).

Pos	Team	Pld	W	D	L	GF	GA	GD	Pts
1	PS PU Bontang	2	2	0	0	4	1	+3	6
2	Barabai	2	0	1	1	3	4	−1	1
3	PS Nunukan	2	0	1	1	2	4	−2	1
4	Perseran Rantau (W)	0	–	–	–	–	–	—	0

(W) Withdrew

Group XVII:

Outcome unknown.

Pos	Team	Pld	W	D	L	GF	GA	GD	Pts
1	Nusaina	0	–	–	–	–	–	—	0
2	Persibom Bolaang Mongondow	0	–	–	–	–	–	—	0
3	Persibolmut North Bolaang Mongondow	0	–	–	–	–	–	—	0
4	Persikokot Kotamobagu	0	–	–	–	–	–	—	0
5	PS Boalemo	0	–	–	–	–	–	—	0

Group XVIII:

All games held at the Lakidende Stadium, Kendari.

All times are Central Indonesia Time (UTC+8).

Pos	Team	Pld	W	D	L	GF	GA	GD	Pts
1	Kendari Utama	4	4	0	0	10	1	+9	12
2	PS Kendari	4	3	0	1	13	2	+11	9
3	Persikol Kolonodale	3	1	0	2	4	12	−8	3
4	PS Dafi Mulia	3	0	1	2	2	6	−4	1
5	Persidapos Poso	4	0	1	3	2	10	−8	−5 (Note: Persidapos Poso 2 times less walk out so points deducted 6.)

Notes:

Group XIX:

Pos	Team	Pld	W	D	L	GF	GA	GD	Pts
1	Persisos South Sorong	0	–	–	–	–	–	—	0
2	Persinab Nabire	0	–	–	–	–	–	—	0
3	Persikota Tidore (W)	0	–	–	–	–	–	—	0
4	Persimap Mappi (W)	0	–	–	–	–	–	—	0

(W) Withdrew

Group XX:

All games held at the Mandala Stadium, Jayapura.

All times are East Indonesia Time (UTC+9).

Pos	Team	Pld	W	D	L	GF	GA	GD	Pts
1	Persindug Nduga	2	1	0	1	3	2	+1	3
2	Persemi Mimika	2	1	0	1	2	3	−1	3
3	Persitoli Tolikara (W)	0	–	–	–	–	–	—	0
4	Persipuja Puncak Jaya (W)	0	–	–	–	–	–	—	0

(W) Withdrew

== Second round ==
In this round, 40 clubs qualify/eligible to compete were divided into 8 groups. This round started on 28 March 2012 and ended on 3 June 2012.

== Third round ==
In this round, 16 clubs qualify/eligible to compete were divided into 4 groups. This round started on 24 June 2012 and ended on 6 July 2012.

== Fifth round ==
In this round, 8 clubs qualify/eligible to compete were divided into 2 groups. This round started on 12 July 2012 and ended on 16 July 2012.

== Final round ==
In this round, 4 clubs qualify/eligible to compete were divided into 1 groups. This stage started on 23 to 25 October 2012.

All games held at the Mini Tambun Stadium, Bekasi.

All times are West Indonesia Time (UTC+7).

=== Standings ===
Pos	Team	Pld	W	D	L	GF	GA	GD	Pts
1	Nusaina	2	1	1	0	2	1	+1	4
2	Persinga Ngawi	2	0	2	0	3	3	0	2
3	Perseden Denpasar	2	0	1	1	2	3	−1	1
4	PS Bintang Jaya Asahan (W)	0	–	–	–	–	–	—	0

(W) Withdrew

=== Results ===
23 October 2012
15:30 WIB

Nusaina	1–0	Perseden Denpasar
	Report

Mini Tambun Stadium, Bekasi
24 October 2012
15:30 WIB

Perseden Denpasar	2–2	Persinga Ngawi
	Report

Mini Tambun Stadium, Bekasi
25 October 2012
15:30 WIB

Persinga Ngawi	1–1	Nusaina
	Report

Mini Tambun Stadium, Bekasi
