= 2013 Liga Indonesia First Division =

Liga Indonesia First Division
- Season: 2013
- Champions: PS Kwarta Deli Serdang (1st title)
- Promoted: Bintang Jaya Asahan; PS Kwarta Deli Serdang; Martapura FC; Persigubin Gunung Bintang; Villa 2000; PSGC Ciamis; Persinga Ngawi; Persida Sidoarjo

The 2013 Liga Indonesia First Division season is the eighteenth edition of Liga Indonesia First Division since its establishment in 1995. The competition is managed by PT. Liga Indonesia (LI).

Perseka Kaimana is the last season champion version BLAI and Persibangga Purbalingga for LPIS version.

The competition starts on 16 June 2013 and scheduled to finish by 17 November 2013.

PS Kwarta Deli Serdang to win the title after defeating Persinga Ngawi with the score 1–0 in the final.

== Format ==
As with previous seasons, the competition system used in the First Division this season is a home tournament with a round robin format. League is divided into three groups stage and knock-out round. In the first stage of the club is divided into 12 groups, group winner and runner-up advances to second stage. While the second stage is divided into four groups of six, the winner and runner-up of each group advances to third stage and also promotion to 2014 Premier Division season. In the third round the eight teams that qualify from the second round were divided into two groups of four, while the knockout consist of finals.

== Teams ==
Group 1	Group 2	Group 3	Group 4	Group 5	Group 6
Bintang Jaya Asahan	Siak	PSBL Bandar Lampung	East Jakarta	PSGC Ciamis	Persibat Batang
PSDS Deli Serdang	Persiks Kuantan Singingi	PLN Jambi	Villa 2000	Persikasi Bekasi	Persik Kendal
PSTS Tanjungbalai	Poslab Labuhan Batu	Persiju Sijunjung	PSJS South Jakarta	PSB Bogor	Persekap Pekalongan
Pidie Jaya	Medan United	West Pasaman	Markuban Matador	Maung Bandung	Persibas Banyumas
North Aceh	PSSA Asahan	PSPP Padang Panjang	Persibabar West Bangka	Persitas Tasikmalaya	Persekabpur Purworejo
Persal South Aceh	Kwarta	PSP Padang	Persista Sintang	Pesik Kuningan	Serang Jaya
Persidi Idi Rayeuk	Bungo	Persepak Payakumbuh	Perserang Serang		

Group 7	Group 8	Group 9	Group 10	Group 11	Group 12
Persipa Pati	Persida Sidoarjo	Persenga Nganjuk	Martapura	Persifa Fak-fak	Persinab Nabire
Persebi Boyolali	Surabaya Muda	Persedikab Kediri	Tapin County	Persikos Sorong City	Persewar Waropen
Persekaba Blora	PSIL Lumajang	Persikoba Batu City	Persehan Marabahan	Persiss Sorong	Persias Asmat
PSISra Sragen	Persikapro Probolinggo	PSID Jombang	Persekap Kapuas	Persisos South Sorong	Persipal Palu
Persinga Ngawi	Perseden Denpasar	Persatu Tuban	PS PPU	Persigubin Gunung Bintang	PSKT Tomohon
Tunas Jogja	Persebi Bima	Persekabpas Pasuruan	Persikutim East Kutai	Persipani Paniai	Nusa Ina
	Persisum Sumbawa				

== First round ==
In this stage 77 teams divided into twelve group (seven group of six and five group of seven). All result for this stage is not complete.

Source: First Division 1st round table

Group 1 in Asahan Regency
Team	Pld	W	D	L	GF	GA	GD	Pts
Bintang Jaya Asahan (A)	5	4	1	0	9	3	+6	13
Persidi Idi Rayeuk (A)	5	3	0	2	10	6	+4	9
PSTS Tanjungbalai	5	2	1	2	4	6	−2	7
Pidie Jaya	5	1	2	2	6	7	−1	5
PSDS Deli Serdang	5	1	2	2	4	5	−1	5
Persal South Aceh	5	1	1	3	7	9	−2	4
North Aceh FC	4	1	1	2	3	7	−4	4

(A) Advance to a further round

Group 2 in Siak Regency
Team	Pld	W	D	L	GF	GA	GD	Pts
PS Siak (A)	5	5	0	0	8	3	+5	15
PSSA Asahan	6	4	1	1	16	6	+10	13
PS Kwarta (A)	5	4	1	0	14	6	+8	13
PS Bungo	6	1	2	3	4	9	−5	5
Medan United	5	1	1	3	6	7	−1	4
Persiks Kuantan Singingi	5	0	2	3	5	12	−7	2
Poslab Labuhan Batu (R)	6	0	1	5	2	12	−10	1

(A) Advance to a further round; (R) Relegated

Group 3 in Bandar Lampung
Team	Pld	W	D	L	GF	GA	GD	Pts
Persiju Sijunjung (A)	5	3	1	1	11	1	+10	10
PSP Padang	4	3	1	0	10	3	+7	10
PSBL Bandar Lampung (A)	4	2	2	0	8	2	+6	8
West Pasaman	5	2	0	3	4	14	−10	6
Persepak Payakumbuh	4	0	1	3	4	10	−6	1
PLN Jambi	4	0	1	3	1	9	−8	1
PSPP Padang Panjang (R)	0	0	0	0	0	0	0	0

(A) Advance to a further round; (R) Relegated

PSPP Padang Panjang withdrew

Group 4 in East Jakarta
Team	Pld	W	D	L	GF	GA	GD	Pts
Perserang Serang (A)	6	5	0	1	12	2	+10	15
Villa 2000 (A)	6	4	1	1	13	7	+6	13
Persibabar West Bangka	6	4	0	2	15	8	+7	12
Matador FC	6	3	1	2	7	7	0	10
East Jakarta	6	3	0	3	9	8	+1	9
Persista Sintang	6	1	0	5	4	18	−14	3
PSJS South Jakarta (R)	6	0	0	6	3	13	−10	0

(A) Advance to a further round; (R) Relegated

Group 5 in Ciamis Regency
Team	Pld	W	D	L	GF	GA	GD	Pts
PSGC Ciamis (A)	5	4	1	0	12	0	+12	13
Maung Bandung (A)	5	2	2	1	7	4	+3	8
Persikasi Bekasi	5	2	1	2	7	7	0	7
Pesik Kuningan	5	2	1	2	7	9	−2	7
PSB Bogor	5	1	1	3	6	13	−7	4
Persitas Tasikmalaya (R)	5	0	2	3	3	9	−6	2

(A) Advance to a further round; (R) Relegated

Group 6 in Batang Regency
Team	Pld	W	D	L	GF	GA	GD	Pts
Persibas Banyumas (A)	5	4	0	1	13	6	+7	12
Persik Kendal (A)	5	3	1	1	8	4	+4	10
Persibat Batang	5	3	0	2	12	3	+9	9
Persekap Pekalongan	5	2	0	3	8	8	0	6
Persekabpur Purworejo	5	1	1	3	3	8	−5	4
PS Serang Jaya (R)	5	1	0	4	2	17	−15	3

(A) Advance to a further round; (R) Relegated

Group 7 in Pati Regency
Team	Pld	W	D	L	GF	GA	GD	Pts
Persinga Ngawi (A)	5	3	1	1	10	7	+3	10
Persipa Pati (A)	5	3	1	1	7	4	+3	10
Persebi Boyolali	5	2	1	2	9	5	+4	7
PSISra Sragen	5	1	3	1	7	8	−1	6
Tunas Jogja	5	2	0	3	5	8	−3	6
Persekaba Blora (R)	5	0	2	3	3	9	−6	2

(A) Advance to a further round; (R) Relegated

Group 8 in Sidoarjo Regency
Team	Pld	W	D	L	GF	GA	GD	Pts
Persida Sidoarjo (A)	5	5	0	0	13	1	+12	15
Perseden Denpasar (A)	5	4	1	0	12	3	+9	13
PSIL Lumajang	6	2	2	2	10	9	+1	8
Surabaya Muda	6	2	1	3	10	11	−1	7
Persikapro Probolinggo	6	2	1	3	4	10	−6	7
Persisum Sumbawa	5	1	1	3	5	12	−7	4
Persebi Bima (R)	5	0	0	5	3	11	−8	0

(A) Advance to a further round; (R) Relegated

Group 9 in Nganjuk Regency
Team	Pld	W	D	L	GF	GA	GD	Pts
Persatu Tuban (A)	3	3	0	0	6	1	+5	9
Persenga Nganjuk (A)	3	2	0	1	8	3	+5	6
Persikoba Batu City	3	2	0	1	6	3	+3	6
Persekabpas Pasuruan	3	2	0	1	3	2	+1	6
Persedikab Kediri	3	0	0	3	4	10	−6	0
PSID Jombang	3	0	0	3	0	8	−8	0

(A) Advance to a further round

Group 10 in Martapura
Team	Pld	W	D	L	GF	GA	GD	Pts
Martapura FC (A)	3	3	0	0	12	4	+8	9
Persekap Kapuas	4	2	0	2	9	10	−1	6
Persikutim East Kutai (A)	3	1	2	0	5	4	+1	5
PS PPU	5	1	2	2	11	14	−3	5
Tapin County	4	1	0	3	5	9	−4	3
Persehan Marabahan	3	0	2	1	7	8	−1	2

(A) Advance to a further round

Group 11 in Fak-Fak Regency
Team	Pld	W	D	L	GF	GA	GD	Pts
Persigubin Gunung Bintang (A)	5	4	0	1	10	6	+4	12
Persisos South Sorong (A)	4	3	0	1	5	4	+1	9
Persipani Paniai	5	2	1	2	9	6	+3	7
Persikos Sorong City	4	2	1	1	6	6	0	7
Persiss Sorong	4	0	2	2	3	5	−2	2
Persifa Fak-fak	4	0	0	4	4	10	−6	0

(A) Advance to a further round

Group 12 in Nabire Regency
Team	Pld	W	D	L	GF	GA	GD	Pts
Persinab Nabire (A)	4	3	1	0	7	1	+6	10
Persewar Waropen (A)	4	2	2	0	6	1	+5	8
Persias Asmat	4	2	1	1	8	5	+3	7
Nusa Ina	4	1	1	2	5	7	−2	4
PSKT Tomohon	4	0	0	4	1	13	−12	0
Persipal Palu (R)	0	0	0	0	0	0	0	0

(A) Advance to a further round; (R) Relegated

Persipal Palu withdrew

== Second round ==
In this stage 24 teams divided into four group of six. This stage scheduled start from 14 to 29 September 2013. Results in the table below are not exhaustive, but the team with the green background has qualified for the third round.

Source:First Division 2nd round table

Group XIII
Team	Pld	W	D	L	GF	GA	GD	Pts
Bintang Jaya Asahan (P)	4	4	0	0	14	2	+12	12
PS Kwarta (P)	5	4	0	1	10	3	+7	12
Persidi Idi Rayeuk	5	2	1	2	7	6	+1	7
PSBL Bandar Lampung	5	1	2	2	8	12	−4	5
Persiju Sijunjung	4	1	1	2	3	5	−2	4
PS Siak	5	0	0	5	3	17	−14	0

(P) Promoted

Group XIV
Team	Pld	W	D	L	GF	GA	GD	Pts
Villa 2000 (P)	4	3	1	0	8	2	+6	10
PSGC Ciamis (P)	4	3	0	1	11	6	+5	9
Persibas Banyumas	4	2	0	2	5	5	0	6
Perserang Serang	4	2	0	2	3	4	−1	6
Maung Bandung	5	1	1	3	8	11	−3	4
Persik Kendal	5	1	0	4	5	12	−7	3

(P) Promoted

Group XV
Team	Pld	W	D	L	GF	GA	GD	Pts
Persinga Ngawi (P)	3	3	0	0	8	2	+6	9
Persida Sidoarjo (P)	4	1	2	1	2	4	−2	5
Persenga Nganjuk	4	2	1	1	6	4	+2	7
Persipa Pati	3	0	3	0	3	3	0	3
Perseden Denpasar	4	1	0	3	3	6	−3	3
Persatu Tuban	4	0	2	2	2	5	−3	2

(P) Promoted

Group XVI
Team	Pld	W	D	L	GF	GA	GD	Pts
Martapura (P)	5	4	0	1	11	6	+5	12
Persigubin Gunung Bintang (P)	5	4	0	1	12	8	+4	12
Persikutim East Kutai	5	3	1	1	9	4	+5	10
Persisos South Sorong	5	2	1	2	6	6	0	7
Persewar Waropen	5	1	0	4	3	7	−4	3
Persinab Nabire	5	0	0	5	5	15	−10	0

(P) Promoted

== Third round ==
In this stage 8 teams divided into two group of four. This stage scheduled start from 9 to 14 November 2013. Winners of each group advance to the finals to compete for the First Division title.

Source:First Division 3rd round table

All games played at the Ciamis Regency.

Group XVII
Team	Pld	W	D	L	GF	GA	GD	Pts
PS Kwarta	3	2	1	0	2	0	+2	7
PSGC Ciamis	3	1	2	0	2	1	+1	5
Bintang Jaya Asahan	3	0	2	1	3	4	−1	2
Villa 2000	3	0	1	2	2	4	−2	1

All games played at the Lebak Bulus Stadium, Jakarta.

Group XVIII
Team	Pld	W	D	L	GF	GA	GD	Pts
Persinga Ngawi	3	2	1	0	10	5	+5	7
Martapura	3	2	0	1	6	2	+4	6
Persida Sidoarjo	3	1	1	1	8	8	0	4
Persigubin Gunung Bintang	3	0	0	3	2	10	−8	0

== Final ==
17 November 2013
15:00 WIB

PS Kwarta	1–0	Persinga Ngawi
Malik 80'	Report

Singaperbangsa Stadium, Purwakarta

== Champions ==
First Division 2013 champions
