= List of winners of the Liga 4 and predecessors =

Indonesian League (4th tier)

Liga Indonesia Third Division (2005–2007) Liga Indonesia Second Division (2008–2013) Liga Nusantara (2014) Liga 4 (2024–present)
- Country
- Indonesia
- Founded
- 2005
- Number of teams
- Unlimited (2025–26 season)
- Current champions
- Pasuruan United (2025–26 season)
- Most successful club
- 12 clubs (1 title each)

A national fourth-tier league of Indonesian football was initially established as the Liga Indonesia Third Division in 2005. Following the formation of the Indonesia Super League in 2008 as the new top-tier competition, the Liga Indonesia Second Division was relegated to the fourth tier. Due to conflicts between Badan Liga Sepakbola Amatir Indonesia (BLAI) and PT Liga Prima Indonesia Sportindo (LPIS), two separate Second Division competitions were held during the 2011–12 season—one under the Indonesia Super League (ISL) and the other under the Indonesian Premier League (IPL).

In January 2014, PSSI rebranded the Second Division as Liga Nusantara. From 2015 to 2023, there was no fourth-tier competition in the Indonesian football league system following the merger of Liga Nusantara with the First Division, which resulted in the formation of Liga 3 as the lowest tier of the national league structure. In 2024, PSSI restructured the league system by bringing back the fourth-tier competition, now called Liga 4.

== List of champions by season ==
- Teams marked with an asterisk (*) were not promoted.

Season	Champions	Runners-up	Third-place
Liga Indonesia Third Division (2005–2007)
2005	PSIR Rembang	Perssin Sinjai	PSISra Sragen
2006	Perseta Tulungagung	Persiko Kotabaru	Persimi Sarmi
2007	Persem Mojokerto	PSBK Blitar	Persewon Wondama
Liga Indonesia Second Division (2008–2013)
2008	PS Barito Putera	PSCS Cilacap	—
2009–10	Persikasi Bekasi	Persewangi Banyuwangi	PS Bangka
2010–11	Persibangga Purbalingga	Persewar Waropen	—
2011–12 (BLAI)	Persinab Nabire	Persekap Kapuas	—
2011–12 (LPIS)	Nusaina	Persinga Ngawi	Perseden Denpasar
2013	Cilegon United	Jember United	—
Liga Nusantara (2014)
2014	Persatu Tuban	Laga	Perssu Sumenep
Liga 4 (2024–present)
2024–25	Tri Brata Rafflesia	Persika Karanganyar	—
2025–26	Pasuruan United	Pesik Kuningan	—

== Number of titles overall ==
Clubs in bold are competing in the 2026–27 Liga 4.

Rank	Club	Winners	Winning seasons
1	Cilegon United	1	2013
1	Nusaina	1	2011–12 (LPIS)
1	Persibangga Purbalingga	1	2010–11
1	**Persem Mojokerto**	1	2007
1	**Perseta Tulungagung**	1	2006
1	**Persikasi Bekasi**	1	2009–10
1	Persinab Nabire	1	2011–12 (BLAI)
1	**PSIR Rembang**	1	2005
1	**Persatu Tuban**	1	2014
1	PS Barito Putera	1	2008
1	Tri Brata Rafflesia	1	2024–25
1	Pasuruan United	1	2025–26

== See also ==
- Indonesian football league system
- List of Indonesian football champions
- List of winners of the Championship and predecessors
- List of winners of the Liga Nusantara and predecessors
- List of winners of the Liga Indonesia Third Division as the fifth tier
