= 2012 Liga Indonesia First Division (BLAI) =

Liga Indonesia First Division
- Season: 2012
- Champions: Perseka Kaimana
- Promoted: PS Bangka; Perseba Bangkalan; Persebo Bondowoso; Perseka Kaimana; Persipas Paser; Persipur Purwodadi; Persisko Bangko; PSAB Aceh Besar; Perseta Tulung Agung; Yahukimo FC; Persikad Depok
- Matches played: 4
- Goals scored: 11 (2.75 per match)
- Top goalscorer: Dedik Kristiawan (2 goals)
- Biggest home win: Persekaba 4-0 PSISa (3 April 2012)
- Highest scoring: Persekaba 4-0 PSISa (3 April 2012)
- Longest winning run: Persekaba (3 matches)
- Longest unbeaten run: Persekaba (3 matches)

The 2012 Liga Indonesia First Division season (Indonesian: Divisi Satu Liga Indonesia 2012) is the seventeenth edition of Liga Indonesia First Division.

The competition starts on 31 March 2012 in Tulungagung and scheduled to finish by July 2012.

== First stage ==
Total 56 clubs will participate in this season, divided into 12 groups. Some result in this stage is unknown.

Key to colours in group tables
Top two placed teams advance to the 2nd Round
Bottom placed teams relegated to the Second Division

Group winner and runner-up qualify for 2nd round.

Group 1:

All match played in Banda Aceh

Pos	Team	Pld	W	D	L	GF	GA	GD	Pts
1	Persidi Idi Rayeuk	0	0	0	0	0	0	0	0
2	Persal Aceh Selatan	0	0	0	0	0	0	0	0
3	North Aceh FC	0	0	0	0	0	0	0	0
4	PS Pidie Jaya	0	0	0	0	0	0	0	0
5	PSAB Aceh Besar	0	0	0	0	0	0	0	0
6	Persas Sabang	0	0	0	0	0	0	0	0

Group 2:

All match played in Asahan Regency

Pos	Team	Pld	W	D	L	GF	GA	GD	Pts
1	PSDS Deli Serdang	0	0	0	0	0	0	0	0
2	Medina Medan Jaya	0	0	0	0	0	0	0	0
3	PSSA Asahan	0	0	0	0	0	0	0	0
4	PSSD Dairi	0	0	0	0	0	0	0	0
5	Poslab Labuhan Batu	0	0	0	0	0	0	0	0
6	PSTS Tanjung Balai	0	0	0	0	0	0	0	0

Group 3:

All match played in Bungo Regency

Pos	Team	Pld	W	D	L	GF	GA	GD	Pts
1	PS Bungo	0	0	0	0	0	0	0	0
2	Persisko Bangko	0	0	0	0	0	0	0	0
3	Persiju Sijunjung	0	0	0	0	0	0	0	0
4	PS Pasaman Barat	0	0	0	0	0	0	0	0
5	PSPP Padang Panjang	0	0	0	0	0	0	0	0
6	Persis Solok	0	0	0	0	0	0	0	0

Group 4:

All match played in East Jakarta

Pos	Team	Pld	W	D	L	GF	GA	GD	Pts
1	PSBL Bandar Lampung	0	0	0	0	0	0	0	0
2	Persista Sintang	0	0	0	0	0	0	0	0
3	Persibabar West Bangka	0	0	0	0	0	0	0	0
4	PS Bangka	0	0	0	0	0	0	0	0
5	Jakarta Timur FC	0	0	0	0	0	0	0	0

Group 5:

All match played in Banyumas Regency

Pos	Team	Pld	W	D	L	GF	GA	GD	Pts
1	Persibas Banyumas	0	0	0	0	0	0	0	0
2	Persekap Pekalongan	0	0	0	0	0	0	0	0
3	PSISra Sragen	0	0	0	0	0	0	0	0
4	Pesitas Tasikmalaya	0	0	0	0	0	0	0	0
5	Persikad Depok	0	0	0	0	0	0	0	0

Group 6:

All match played in Kridosono Stadium, Blora Regency

Pos	Team	Pld	W	D	L	GF	GA	GD	Pts
1	Persekaba Blora (A)	3	3	0	0	7	1	+6	9
2	Persipur Purwodadi	1	0	0	1	1	2	−1	0
3	Persipa Pati	1	0	0	1	0	1	−1	0
4	PSISa Salatiga	1	0	0	1	0	4	−4	0

(A) Advance to a further round

Group 7:

All match played in Tulungagung Regency

Pos	Team	Pld	W	D	L	GF	GA	GD	Pts
1	Perseta Tulungagung	1	1	0	0	2	1	+1	3
2	Persenga Nganjuk	0	0	0	0	0	0	0	0
3	Persidikab Kediri	0	0	0	0	0	0	0	0
4	PSID Jombang	1	0	0	1	1	2	−1	0

Group 8:

All match played in Bangkalan Regency

Pos	Team	Pld	W	D	L	GF	GA	GD	Pts
1	Persekap Pasuruan	0	0	0	0	0	0	0	0
2	Perseba Super	0	0	0	0	0	0	0	0
3	Persisum Sumbawa	0	0	0	0	0	0	0	0
4	Persida Sidoarjo	0	0	0	0	0	0	0	0

Group 9:

All match played in Pasuruan

Pos	Team	Pld	W	D	L	GF	GA	GD	Pts
1	Persekabpas Pasuruan	0	0	0	0	0	0	0	0
2	Persebo Bondowoso	0	0	0	0	0	0	0	0
3	Persikapro Probolinggo	0	0	0	0	0	0	0	0
4	Protaba Bantul	0	0	0	0	0	0	0	0

Group 10:

All match played in Penajam North Paser

Pos	Team	Pld	W	D	L	GF	GA	GD	Pts
1	Persehan Marabahan	0	0	0	0	0	0	0	0
2	PS Tapin	0	0	0	0	0	0	0	0
3	Persipas Paser	0	0	0	0	0	0	0	0
4	PS North Penajam Paser	0	0	0	0	0	0	0	0

Group 11:

All match played in Tomohon

Pos	Team	Pld	W	D	L	GF	GA	GD	Pts
1	PSKT Tomohon	0	0	0	0	0	0	0	0
2	Persipal Palu	0	0	0	0	0	0	0	0
3	Persewar Waropen	0	0	0	0	0	0	0	0
4	Yahukimo FC	0	0	0	0	0	0	0	0

Group 12:

All match played in Fakfak Regency

Pos	Team	Pld	W	D	L	GF	GA	GD	Pts
1	Persifa Fakfak	0	0	0	0	0	0	0	0
2	Perseka Kaimana	0	0	0	0	0	0	0	0
3	Persigubin Gunung Bintang	0	0	0	0	0	0	0	0
4	Persipan Paniai	0	0	0	0	0	0	0	0

== Second stage ==
Total 24 clubs will participate in this stage, divided into 6 groups. All result in this stage is unknown.

== Third stage ==
Total 12 clubs will participate in this stage, divided into 2 groups. Group winner and runner-up advances to Semifinal. Ranking 1 to 5/6 in each group promotion to 2013 Premier Division.

All match played in Krakatau Steel Stadium in Cilegon

=== Group XX ===
Pos	Team	Pld	W	D	L	GF	GA	GD	Pts
1	Perseka Kaimana (P)	5	3	2	0	7	3	+4	11
2	Persebo Bondowoso (P)	5	2	3	0	7	2	+5	9
3	Perseba Bangkalan (P)	5	2	0	3	6	9	−3	6
4	Persipas Paser (P)	5	1	2	2	8	9	−1	5
5	Perseta Tulungagung (P)	5	1	2	2	6	8	−2	5
6	Yahukimo FC (P)	5	0	3	2	5	8	−3	3

(P) Promoted

=== Group XIX ===
Pos	Team	Pld	W	D	L	GF	GA	GD	Pts
1	PS Bangka (P)	4	3	0	1	9	3	+6	9
2	Persipur Purwodadi (P)	4	3	0	1	8	6	+2	9
3	Persisko Bangko (P)	4	2	0	2	6	7	−1	6
4	PSAB Aceh Besar (P)	4	1	0	3	8	9	−1	3
5	Persikad Depok (P)	4	1	0	3	4	10	−6	3

(P) Promoted

== Knockout stage ==
The knockout stage of 2012 Liga Indonesia First Division (BLAI) is scheduled to begin on 10 July 2012 and to be completed on 14 July 2012 with the final at the Lebak Bulus Stadium in Jakarta.

=== Bracket ===
Semi-finals
10 July – Cilegon
PS Bangka	2
Persebo Bondowoso	1
11 July – Cilegon
Persipur Purwodadi	1
Perseka Kaimana	2

Final
14 July – Cilegon
PS Bangka	1
Perseka Kaimana	2

=== Semi-finals ===
Tuesday, 10 July 2012
15:00 WIB

PS Bangka	2-1	Persebo Bondowoso
Joko Tutuko 8'; Hanto 20'	Report	41' Novic Budi S.

Krakatau Steel Stadium, Cilegon

Wednesday, 11 July 2012
15:00 WIB

Persipur Purwodadi	1-2 (a.e.t.)	Perseka Kaimana
Ardiles Agung 80'	Report	66' Matias Lamarubun; 119' Suharsa Wahid

Krakatau Steel Stadium, Cilegon

=== Final ===
Saturday, 14 July 2012
15:00 WIB

PS Bangka	1-2	Perseka Kaimana
Hanto 70'	Report	10', 78' Jackson Osolk

Lebak Bulus Stadium, Jakarta
