= 2010–11 Liga Indonesia Third Division =

Liga Indonesia Third Division
- Season: 2010–11
- Teams: 98 clubs
- Champions: MBU Sidoarjo
- Promoted: Persibolmut; PS Dafi Mulia; PS Bintang Jaya Asahan; PS TGM Medan; Persekabpur Purworejo; Maung Bandung; Martapura; Persekat Katingan; Perseden Denpasar; PSK Kupang; Persipuja Puncak Jaya; Nusaina; Villa 2000; PS Batam; Gresik Putra; MBU Sidoarjo
- Biggest home win: Persikokot 11–1 Persidapos (28 October 2010), Nusaina 11–1 Persilaki (21 September 2010)
- Highest scoring: Martapura 7–6 Persemas (30 June 2010)
- Longest unbeaten run: Persibolmut (15 games)

2010–11 Liga Indonesia Third Division is the sixth season of Liga Indonesia Third Division, managed by the Amateur League Board of the Football Association of Indonesia (PSSI).

== Third stage ==
=== Qualify teams ===
All qualify teams after 7 December 2010.

- Sumatra zone (4 teams promotions)
  in Thamrin Graha Metropolitan Complex, Medan Helvetia
  - Persip Pasee (Aceh)
  - Persijaya Aceh Jaya (Aceh)
  - PS Bintang Jaya Asahan (North Sumatra)
  - PS TGM Medan (North Sumatra)
  - PSKB Bukittinggi (West Sumatra)
  - Persepak Payakumbuh (West Sumatra)
- Java zone (4 teams promotions)
  - Perssi Sukabumi (West Java)
  - Maung Bandung (West Java)
  - Persekabpur Purworejo (Central Java)
  - Tunas Jogja (Yogyakarta)
  - Persatu Tuban (East Java)
  - PSIL Lumajang (East Java)
  - MBU Sidoarjo (East Java)
  - Gresik Putra (East Java)
- Kalimantan zone (2 teams promotions)
  in Tuah Pahoe Stadium, Palangkaraya
  - PS PU Putra (Central Kalimantan)
  - Persekat Katingan (Central Kalimantan)
  - Persekap Kapuas (Central Kalimantan)
  - Martapura (South Kalimantan)
- Sulawesi zone (2 teams promotions)
  in Lakidende Stadium, Kendari
  - Persibolmut North Bolaang Mongondow (North Sulawesi)
  - Persikokot Kotamobagu (North Sulawesi)
  - PS Dafi Mulia South Konawe (Southeast Sulawesi)
  - PS Kendari (Southeast Sulawesi)
- Lesser Sunda Islands zone (2 teams promotions)
  - Perseden Denpasar (Bali)
  - PSK Kupang (East Nusa Tenggara)
- Maluku & Papua zone (2 teams promotions)
  - Nusaina (Maluku)
  - Persipuja Puncak Jaya (Papua; now Central Papua)
  - Persimap Mappi (Papua; now South Papua)
  - Persindug Nduga (Papua; now Highland Papua)

=== Table and results ===
Key to colours in group tables
Teams advance to the 4th round & promotion to Second Division

==== Sumatra zone ====
Thamrin Graha Metropolitan Complex, Medan Helvetia

| Pos | Team | Pld | W | D | L | GF | GA | GD | Pts |
|---|---|---|---|---|---|---|---|---|---|
| 1 | PS TGM Medan | 5 | 4 | 1 | 0 | 24 | 6 | +18 | 13 |
| 2 | PS Bintang Jaya Asahan | 5 | 4 | 1 | 0 | 26 | 8 | +18 | 13 |
| 3 | PSKB Bukittinggi | 5 | 3 | 0 | 2 | 10 | 10 | 0 | 9 |
| 4 | Persijaya Aceh Jaya | 5 | 1 | 1 | 3 | 6 | 11 | −5 | 4 |
| 5 | Persip Pasee | 5 | 1 | 0 | 4 | 5 | 14 | −9 | 3 |
| 6 | Persepak Payakumbuh | 5 | 0 | 1 | 4 | 8 | 30 | −22 | 1 |

6 December 2010

| PS TGM Medan | 5–1 | Persip Pasee |
|---|---|---|
| Bobby 2', 30', 85'; Putra (??); Arif (??) | | (??) Jamaluddin |

Thamrin Graha Metropolitan Complex, Medan Helvetia
6 December 2010

| Persepak | 4–4 | Persijaya |
|---|---|---|
| Fendro (??); Al Hafiz (??) | | (??) Heri; (??) Ali; (??) Anwar; (??) April |

Thamrin Graha Metropolitan Complex, Medan Helvetia
7 December 2010

| PS Bintang Jaya | 4–0 | PSKB Bukittinggi |
|---|---|---|
| Deni 20', 63'; Zulkifli (??); Bambang 85' |

Thamrin Graha Metropolitan Complex, Medan Helvetia
7 December 2010

| Persip Pasee | 2–0 | Persepak |

Thamrin Graha Metropolitan Complex, Medan Helvetia
8 December 2010

| PS Bintang Jaya | 3–1 | Persijaya |
|---|---|---|
| M. Sholih (??); Aidun (??); Bambang (??) | | (??) Dedi |

Thamrin Graha Metropolitan Complex, Medan Helvetia
8 December 2010

| PS TGM Medan | 4–0 | PSKB Bukittinggi |

Thamrin Graha Metropolitan Complex, Medan Helvetia
10 December 2010

| PS Bintang Jaya | 9–2 | Persepak |

Thamrin Graha Metropolitan Complex, Medan Helvetia
10 December 2010

| PS TGM Medan | 2–0 | Persijaya |

Thamrin Graha Metropolitan Complex, Medan Helvetia
11 December 2010

| PSKB Bukittinggi | 2–1 | Persip Pasee |

Thamrin Graha Metropolitan Complex, Medan Helvetia
11 December 2010

| PS TGM Medan | 9–1 | Persepak |

Thamrin Graha Metropolitan Complex, Medan Helvetia
12 December 2010

| PSKB Bukittinggi | 2–0 | Persijaya |

Thamrin Graha Metropolitan Complex, Medan Helvetia
12 December 2010

| PS Bintang Jaya | 6–1 | Persip Pasee |
|---|---|---|
| Zulkifli 36', 45'; Deni 38'; M. Sholih 61'; M. Irfan 47'; Hendra 85' | | (??) ?? |

Thamrin Graha Metropolitan Complex, Medan Helvetia
13 December 2010

| Persijaya | 1–0 | Persip Pasee |

Thamrin Graha Metropolitan Complex, Medan Helvetia
14 December 2010

| PSKB Bukittinggi | 6–1 | Persepak |

Thamrin Graha Metropolitan Complex, Medan Helvetia
14 December 2010

| Bintang Jaya | 4–4 | PS TGM Medan |

Thamrin Graha Metropolitan Complex, Medan Helvetia

| Pos | Team | Pld | W | D | L | GF | GA | GD | Pts |
|---|---|---|---|---|---|---|---|---|---|
| 1 | Villa 2000 | 2 | 2 | 0 | 0 | 7 | 2 | +5 | 6 |
| 2 | PS Batam | 2 | 1 | 0 | 1 | 3 | 4 | −1 | 3 |
| 3 | PS Bengkulu Putra | 2 | 0 | 0 | 2 | 4 | 8 | −4 | 0 |
| 4 | PS PLN Jambi (W) | 0 | – | – | – | – | – | — | 0 |
| 5 | PS Merangin (W) | 0 | – | – | – | – | – | — | 0 |

(W) Withdrew

==== Java zone ====
Group XX :

| Pos | Team | Pld | W | D | L | GF | GA | GD | Pts |
|---|---|---|---|---|---|---|---|---|---|
| 1 | Maung Bandung | 3 | 1 | 2 | 0 | 1 | 0 | +1 | 5 |
| 2 | MBU Sidoarjo | 3 | 1 | 1 | 1 | 3 | 2 | +1 | 4 |
| 3 | PSIL Lumajang | 3 | 0 | 3 | 0 | 1 | 1 | 0 | 3 |
| 4 | Perssi Sukabumi | 3 | 0 | 2 | 1 | 0 | 2 | −2 | 2 |

Group XXI : Lokajaya Stadium, Tuban or WR Supratman Stadium, Purworejo

| Pos | Team | Pld | W | D | L | GF | GA | GD | Pts |
|---|---|---|---|---|---|---|---|---|---|
| 1 | Persekabpur Purworejo | 3 | 2 | 1 | 0 | 6 | 2 | +4 | 7 |
| 2 | Gresik Putra | 3 | 2 | 1 | 0 | 5 | 2 | +3 | 7 |
| 3 | Tunas Jogja | 3 | 0 | 1 | 2 | 3 | 6 | −3 | 1 |
| 4 | Persatu Tuban | 3 | 0 | 1 | 2 | 3 | 7 | −4 | 1 |

==== Kalimantan zone ====
Tuah Pahoe Stadium, Palangkaraya

| Pos | Team | Pld | W | D | L | GF | GA | GD | Pts |
|---|---|---|---|---|---|---|---|---|---|
| 1 | Martapura | 3 | 3 | 0 | 0 | 12 | 0 | +12 | 9 |
| 2 | Persekat Katingan | 3 | 2 | 0 | 1 | 3 | 4 | −1 | 6 |
| 3 | Persekap Kapuas | 3 | 0 | 1 | 2 | 0 | 4 | −4 | 1 |
| 4 | PS PU Putra | 3 | 0 | 1 | 2 | 1 | 8 | −7 | 1 |

==== Sulawesi zone ====
Lakidende Stadium, Kendari

| Pos | Team | Pld | W | D | L | GF | GA | GD | Pts |
|---|---|---|---|---|---|---|---|---|---|
| 1 | Persibolmut | 2 | 2 | 0 | 0 | 6 | 3 | +3 | 6 |
| 2 | PS Dafi Mulia | 2 | 1 | 0 | 1 | 3 | 3 | 0 | 3 |
| 3 | PS Kendari | 2 | 0 | 0 | 2 | 3 | 6 | −3 | 0 |
| 4 | Persikokot Kotamobagu (W) | 0 | – | – | – | – | – | — | 0 |

(W) Withdrew
27 November 2010

| Persibolmut | 2–1 | PS Dafi Mulia |

Lakidende Stadium, Kendari
29 November 2010

| PS Kendari | 1–2 | PS Dafi Mulia |

Lakidende Stadium, Kendari
1 December 2010

| PS Kendari | 2–4 | Persibolmut |

Lakidende Stadium, Kendari

==== Maluku & Papua zone ====
Group XXIV : Manado

| Pos | Team | Pld | W | D | L | GF | GA | GD | Pts |
|---|---|---|---|---|---|---|---|---|---|
| 1 | Nusaina | 2 | 1 | 0 | 1 | 4 | 4 | 0 | 3 |
| 2 | Persipuja Puncak Jaya | 2 | 1 | 0 | 1 | 4 | 4 | 0 | 3 |
| 3 | Persimap Mappi | 2 | 1 | 0 | 1 | 3 | 3 | 0 | 3 |
| 4 | Persindug Nduga | 0 | – | – | – | – | – | — | 0 |

== Fourth stage ==
All participants this round of automatic promotion to the 2011–12 Liga Indonesia Second Division.

Qualify teams

| Group A | Group B | Group C | Group D |
|---|---|---|---|
| PS TGM Medan | Persekabpur Purworejo | Persibolmut North Bolmong | Nusaina |
| PS Bintang Jaya Asahan | Maung Bandung | PS Dafi Mulia | MBU Sidoarjo |
| Villa 2000 | Gresik Putra | Martapura | Persipuja Puncak Jaya |
| PS Batam | Perseden Denpasar | Persekat Katingan | PSK Kupang |

Key to colours in group tables
advanced to the 2010–11 Liga Indonesia Third Division Round of 4

Group A : Tugu Stadium, North Jakarta, Jakarta

| Pos | Team | Pld | W | D | L | GF | GA | GD | Pts |
|---|---|---|---|---|---|---|---|---|---|
| 1 | PS TGM Medan | 1 | 1 | 0 | 0 | 1 | 0 | +1 | 3 |
| 2 | Villa 2000 | 1 | 0 | 0 | 1 | 0 | 1 | −1 | 0 |
| 3 | PS Batam (W) | 0 | – | – | – | – | – | — | 0 |
| 4 | PS Bintang Jaya Asahan (W) | 0 | – | – | – | – | – | — | 0 |

(W) Withdrew

Group B : W.R. Supratman Stadium, Purworejo, Central Java

| Pos | Team | Pld | W | D | L | GF | GA | GD | Pts |
|---|---|---|---|---|---|---|---|---|---|
| 1 | Persekabpur Purworejo | 3 | 3 | 0 | 0 | 6 | 0 | +6 | 9 |
| 2 | Perseden Denpasar | 3 | 1 | 1 | 1 | 4 | 3 | +1 | 4 |
| 3 | Gresik Putra | 3 | 0 | 1 | 2 | 3 | 6 | −3 | 1 |
| 4 | Maung Bandung | 3 | 1 | 0 | 2 | 2 | 6 | −4 | 0 (Note: Maung Bandung FC value minus 3 points because WO in the final game.) |

Notes:

Group C : Bea Cukai Stadium, Rawamangun, Jakarta

| Pos | Team | Pld | W | D | L | GF | GA | GD | Pts |
|---|---|---|---|---|---|---|---|---|---|
| 1 | Persibolmut | 3 | 3 | 0 | 0 | 6 | 1 | +5 | 9 |
| 2 | Martapura | 3 | 1 | 1 | 1 | 8 | 5 | +3 | 4 |
| 3 | Persekat Katingan | 3 | 1 | 0 | 2 | 5 | 11 | −6 | 3 |
| 4 | PS Dafi Mulia | 3 | 0 | 1 | 2 | 7 | 9 | −2 | 1 |

Group D : Surabaya, East Java

| Pos | Team | Pld | W | D | L | GF | GA | GD | Pts |
|---|---|---|---|---|---|---|---|---|---|
| 1 | MBU Sidoarjo | 2 | 1 | 1 | 0 | 3 | 1 | +2 | 4 |
| 2 | Nusaina | 2 | 1 | 1 | 0 | 2 | 1 | +1 | 4 |
| 3 | Persipuja Puncak Jaya | 2 | 0 | 0 | 2 | 0 | 3 | −3 | 0 |
| 4 | PSK Kupang (W) | 0 | – | – | – | – | – | — | 0 |

(W) Withdrew

== Knockout stage ==
Participate is 4 groups winner from fourth stage.

=== Qualify teams ===
- PS TGM Medan (North Sumatra)
- Persibolmut (North Sulawesi)
- Persekabpur Purworejo (Central Java)
- MBU Sidoarjo (East Java)

=== Knockout phase ===
Semi-finals
22 February 2011 - Lebak Bulus Stadium
MBU Sidoarjo | 1
Persekabpur Purworejo | 0
22 February 2011 - Lebak Bulus Stadium
PS TGM Medan | 3
Persibolmut | 0

Final
24 February 2011 - Lebak Bulus Stadium
MBU Sidoarjo | 1 (8)
PS TGM Medan | 1 (7)

==== Semi-finals ====
22 February 2011
13:30 (UTC+7)

| MBU Sidoarjo | 1–0 | Persekabpur Purworejo |
|---|---|---|
| Lucky Wiji (yellow card) 9'; Dodik Haryanto (yellow card) 29'; Ahmad Zakaria (yellow card) 48'; Nazaruddin Martha (yellow card) 59'; Febri Mahendra (yellow card) ??' (yellow-red card) 75'; Nasrul Ariyanto 89' | Report | (yellow card) 27' M. Arifin; (yellow card) 79' Erika Ade |

Lebak Bulus Stadium, South Jakarta
Referee: Purwanto
22 February 2011
16:00 (UTC+7)

| PS TGM Medan | 3–0 (w.o.) | Persibolmut |
|---|---|---|
| | Report |

Lebak Bulus Stadium, South Jakarta
Referee: Hifni

==== Final ====
24 February 2011
(UTC+7)

| MBU Sidoarjo | 1–1 (a.e.t.) | PS TGM Medan |
|---|---|---|
| Alto Yugens (yellow card) ??'; Nasrul Ariyanto (yellow card) ??'; Jaya Andriyanto 89' (pen.); Dodik Haryanto (yellow card) ??' (yellow-red card) 108'; Rahmat Hidayat (yellow card) ??' | Report | (yellow card) ??' (yellow-red card) 65' Reinhard; (yellow card) ??' Robby Ramadhan; (yellow card) ??' Irawan; 83' Robby Ramadhan; (yellow card) ??' Andryansah; (yellow card) ??' Fahnur |
Penalties
| Aris S. (penalty scored); Salman A. (penalty scored); Wildan A. (penalty scored); Jaya Andriyanto (penalty scored); Nasrul Ariyanto (penalty scored); M. Rahmad (penalty scored); Miki Primajaya (penalty scored); Alto Yugens (penalty scored) | 8–7 | (penalty scored) Agung P.; (penalty scored) Ridho K.; (penalty scored) Robby Ramadhan; (penalty scored) Syaidansyah; (penalty scored) Ade Irwan; (penalty scored) Akrur Riski; (penalty scored) Fahnur; (penalty missed) Irawan |

Lebak Bulus Stadium, South Jakarta
Attendance: 100
Referee: Hifni

== Champions ==
Champions
