= 2013 Liga Indonesia Second Division =

Liga Indonesia Second Division
- Season: 2013
- Champions: Cilegon United (1st title)
- Promoted: PS TGM Medan; Rumbai; Cilegon United; Persilat Central Lampung; UNI Bandung; PS Badung; Persesa Sampang; Jember United; Bontang Mitra United; PSN Nunukan; Persitoli Tolikara; Persiyali Yalimo
- Matches: 208
- Goals: 712 (3.42 per match)
- Longest winning run: Cilegon United (7 matches)
- Longest unbeaten run: Cilegon United (14 matches)
- Longest winless run: PSKB Bukit Tinggi; Bengkulu Putra; PS Mataram; TGM Medan (5 matches)
- Longest losing run: PSKB Bukit Tinggi; Bengkulu Putra (5 matches)

The 2013 Liga Indonesia Second Division season is the eighteenth edition of Liga Indonesia Second Division since its establishment in 1995. This season is also the last season of this league before dissolved. The competition is managed by Badan Liga Sepakbola Amatir Indonesia (BLAI, Indonesia Amateur League Board).

Persinab Nabire is the last season champion version BLAI and Nusaina for LPIS version.

The competition starts on 28 September 2013 and finish on 15 December 2013.

== Format ==
As with previous seasons, the competition system used in the Second Division this season is a home tournament with a round robin format. League is divided into three groups stage and knock-out round. In the first stage of the club is divided into 12 groups, group winner and runner-up advances to second stage. While the second stage is divided into four groups of six, the winner and runner-up of each group advances to third stage and also promotion to 2014 First Division season. In the third round the eight teams that qualify from the second round were divided into two groups of four, while the knockout consist of semi-finals and finals as well as the third place playoff.

== First round ==
In this stage 73 teams divided into twelve group (four group of seven, five group of six and three group of five).

Source:Second Division 1st round table

Group A
Team	Pld	W	D	L	GF	GA	GD	Pts
PS Peureulak Raya	6	4	1	1	9	6	+3	13
Persip Pasee	6	4	0	2	11	4	+7	12
Persati Kuala Simpang	6	3	2	1	9	3	+6	11
Lhokseumawe	6	3	1	2	8	6	+2	10
Persijaya Aceh Jaya	6	1	2	3	5	8	−3	5
PSAU North Aceh	6	1	1	4	8	14	−6	4
Persada Southwest Aceh	6	1	1	4	5	14	−9	4

Group B
Team	Pld	W	D	L	GF	GA	GD	Pts
PS Belitung Timur	3	2	1	0	8	2	+6	7
PS Bangka Tengah	4	2	1	1	7	3	+4	7
PS Karimun	4	2	1	1	9	6	+3	7
Persibri Batanghari	3	1	2	0	5	2	+3	5
PS Kerinci	4	0	2	2	2	11	−9	2
Persijam Jambi	4	0	1	3	2	9	−7	1

Group C
Team	Pld	W	D	L	GF	GA	GD	Pts
Rumbai	5	4	1	0	10	3	+7	13
PS TGM Medan	5	2	2	1	11	6	+5	8
Persemai Dumai	5	2	2	1	4	3	+1	8
Persis Solok	5	2	2	1	7	7	0	8
PS Serdang Bedagai	5	1	1	3	7	7	0	4
PSKB Bukittinggi	5	0	0	5	3	16	−13	0

Group D
Team	Pld	W	D	L	GF	GA	GD	Pts
Cilegon United	5	5	0	0	16	0	+16	15
Persilat Central Lampung	5	3	0	2	11	6	+5	9
Carsurin FC	5	2	1	2	10	6	+4	7
PS Muko Muko	5	2	1	2	6	7	−1	7
West Persija	5	1	2	2	7	8	−1	5
Bengkulu Putra	5	0	0	5	1	24	−23	0
PS Kubu Raya (D)	0	0	0	0	0	0	0	0

(D) Disqualified

Group E
Team	Pld	W	D	L	GF	GA	GD	Pts
U.N.I Bandung	6	5	0	1	9	2	+7	15
PSGJ Cirebon	6	4	0	2	8	4	+4	12
Persipo Purwakarta	6	3	1	2	4	4	0	10
Persigar Garut	5	2	1	2	5	5	0	7
Perssi Sukabumi	6	2	1	3	3	5	−2	7
Persikoban Banjar	5	1	1	3	1	7	−6	4
Persikotas Tasikmalaya	6	1	0	5	3	6	−3	3

Group F
Team	Pld	W	D	L	GF	GA	GD	Pts
Bontang Mitra United	4	3	0	1	7	7	0	9
PSN Nunukan	4	2	1	1	8	4	+4	7
Persesam Sampit	4	1	2	1	6	5	+1	5
PS PU Bontang	4	1	1	2	6	8	−2	4
PS PU Putra Palangkaraya	4	1	0	3	5	8	−3	3

Group G
Team	Pld	W	D	L	GF	GA	GD	Pts
Jember United	4	4	0	0	12	1	+11	12
Bajul Ijo	4	2	1	1	8	4	+4	7
Persekat Katingan	4	2	1	1	5	2	+3	7
Gresik Putra	4	1	0	3	1	7	−6	3
Persekama Madiun	4	0	0	4	1	13	−12	0
Persika Karanganyar (D)	0	0	0	0	0	0	0	0

(D) Disqualified

Group H
Team	Pld	W	D	L	GF	GA	GD	Pts
Perssu Sumenep	3	3	0	0	9	2	+7	9
Persesa Sampang	3	2	0	1	4	3	+1	6
Perseftim East Flores	3	0	1	2	0	3	−3	1
Perss SoE	3	0	1	2	0	5	−5	1
Persap Alor (D)	0	0	0	0	0	0	0	0
PS Batam (D)	0	0	0	0	0	0	0	0

(D) Disqualified

Group I
Team	Pld	W	D	L	GF	GA	GD	Pts
PS Badung	5	5	0	0	15	2	+13	15
PS Gianyar	5	3	1	1	11	4	+7	10
Protaba Bantul	5	2	0	3	10	8	+2	6
Perst Tabanan	5	1	1	3	5	10	−5	4
Perslobar West Lombok	5	1	1	3	9	21	−12	4
PS Mataram	5	0	3	2	6	11	−5	3
Perslotim East Lombok (D)	0	0	0	0	0	0	0	0

(D) Disqualified

Group J
Team	Pld	W	D	L	GF	GA	GD	Pts
Persetala Tanah Laut	4	2	2	0	10	6	+4	8
Barabai FC	4	2	2	0	5	3	+2	8
Perseran Rantau	4	2	1	1	7	4	+3	7
Persemas Tanah Bumbu	4	1	0	3	10	10	0	3
Persetab Tabalong	4	0	1	3	2	11	−9	1

Group K
Team	Pld	W	D	L	GF	GA	GD	Pts
Persidago Gorontalo	4	2	2	0	7	1	+6	8
Halmahera FC	4	2	1	1	7	5	+2	7
Persminsel South Minahasa	4	2	1	1	5	4	+1	7
PS Manado	4	1	1	2	4	5	−1	4
PS Bone Bolango	4	0	1	3	2	10	−8	1
PS Dafi Mulia (D)	0	0	0	0	0	0	0	0

(D) Disqualified

Group L
Team	Pld	W	D	L	GF	GA	GD	Pts
Persitoli Tolikara	3	2	1	0	4	1	+3	7
Persiyali Yalimo	3	1	2	0	3	2	+1	5
Persimer Merauke	3	1	0	2	4	6	−2	3
Persindug Nduga	3	0	1	2	4	6	−2	1
PSHL East Leihitu (D)	0	0	0	0	0	0	0	0

(D) Disqualified

== Second round ==
In this stage 24 teams divided into six group of four, kick-off for this round began on 19 November 2013 except Group R which will begin on 24 November 2013. Winner and runner-up of each group advanced to third round and also promoted to First Division next season.

Source:Second Division 2nd round table

All match played in Teladan Stadium and TD. Pardede Stadium, Medan

Group M
Team	Pld	W	D	L	GF	GA	GD	Pts
TGM Medan	2	2	0	0	4	0	+4	6
Rumbai FC	2	1	0	1	1	3	−2	3
Persip Pasee	2	0	0	2	0	2	−2	0
PS Peureulak Raya (D)	0	0	0	0	0	0	0	0

(D) Disqualified

All match played in Krakatau Steel Stadium and Sadag Stadium, Cilegon

Group N
Team	Pld	W	D	L	GF	GA	GD	Pts
Cilegon United	3	2	1	0	7	2	+5	7
Persilat Central Lampung	3	1	2	0	4	3	+1	5
PS Bangka Tengah	3	1	0	2	6	7	−1	3
PS Belitung Timur	3	0	1	2	2	7	−5	1

All match played in Gelora Samudera Kuta and Yoga Parkhanti Stadium, Jimbaran

Group O
Team	Pld	W	D	L	GF	GA	GD	Pts
U.N.I Bandung	3	3	0	0	8	1	+7	9
PS Badung	3	2	0	1	6	2	+4	6
PS Gianyar	3	1	0	2	3	6	−3	3
PSGJ Cirebon	3	0	0	3	2	10	−8	0

All match played in Bumi Moro Stadium and Persebaya field, Surabaya

Group P
Team	Pld	W	D	L	GF	GA	GD	Pts
Persesa Sampang	3	2	1	0	3	1	+2	7
Jember United	3	1	2	0	5	4	+1	5
Bajul Ijo	3	1	0	2	3	4	−1	3
Perssu Sumenep	3	0	1	2	1	3	−2	1

All match played in Mulawarman Stadium and Taman Prestasi Stadium, Bontang

Group Q
Team	Pld	W	D	L	GF	GA	GD	Pts
Bontang Mitra United	3	2	1	0	7	3	+4	7
PSN Nunukan	3	2	1	0	5	1	+4	7
Persetala Tanah Laut	3	1	0	2	4	6	−2	3
Barabai FC	3	0	0	3	1	7	−6	0

All match played in Pendidikan Stadium, Wamena

Group R
Team	Pld	W	D	L	GF	GA	GD	Pts
Persitoli Tolikara	1	1	0	0	1	0	+1	3
Persiyali Yalimo	1	0	0	1	0	1	−1	0
Persidago Gorontalo (D)	0	0	0	0	0	0	0	0
Halmahera FC (D)	0	0	0	0	0	0	0	0

(D) Disqualified

== Third round ==
In this stage 12 teams divided into two group of six, kick-off for this round began on 5 to 11 December 2013. Winner from each group qualify for the final match.

Source:Second Division 3rd round table

All match played in Krakatau Steel Stadium, Cilegon

Group S
Team	Pld	W	D	L	GF	GA	GD	Pts
Cilegon United	5	3	2	0	9	1	+8	11
U.N.I Bandung	5	3	1	1	13	3	+10	10
PS Badung	5	3	0	2	6	8	−2	9
Rumbai FC	5	2	1	2	6	10	−4	7
Persilat Central Lampung	5	1	1	3	4	12	−8	4
TGM Medan	5	0	1	4	4	8	−4	1

All match played in Noto Hadinegoro Stadium, Jember

Group T
Team	Pld	W	D	L	GF	GA	GD	Pts
Jember United	5	4	1	0	11	2	+9	13
Persitoli Tolikara	5	2	2	1	5	4	+1	8
Persiyali Yalimo	5	2	1	2	8	9	−1	7
PSN Nunukan	5	2	0	3	5	7	−2	6
Bontang Mitra United	5	1	1	3	3	5	−2	4
Persesa Sampang	5	1	1	3	5	10	−5	4

== Final ==
Sunday, 15 December 2013
15:00 WIB

Cilegon United	6 – 3	Jember United
Oktafianus 26', 89'; Dado Sutisna 31'; Suwandi 45+1'; Pandi Ahmad 70'; Dian Endra 83'	Report	Dwi Andika 29'; Wahyu Saputra 33'; Matheus Victor 40'

GOR Ciracas, Jakarta

== Champions ==
Second Division 2013 winner
