= Muhammad Ridho =

Indonesian footballer

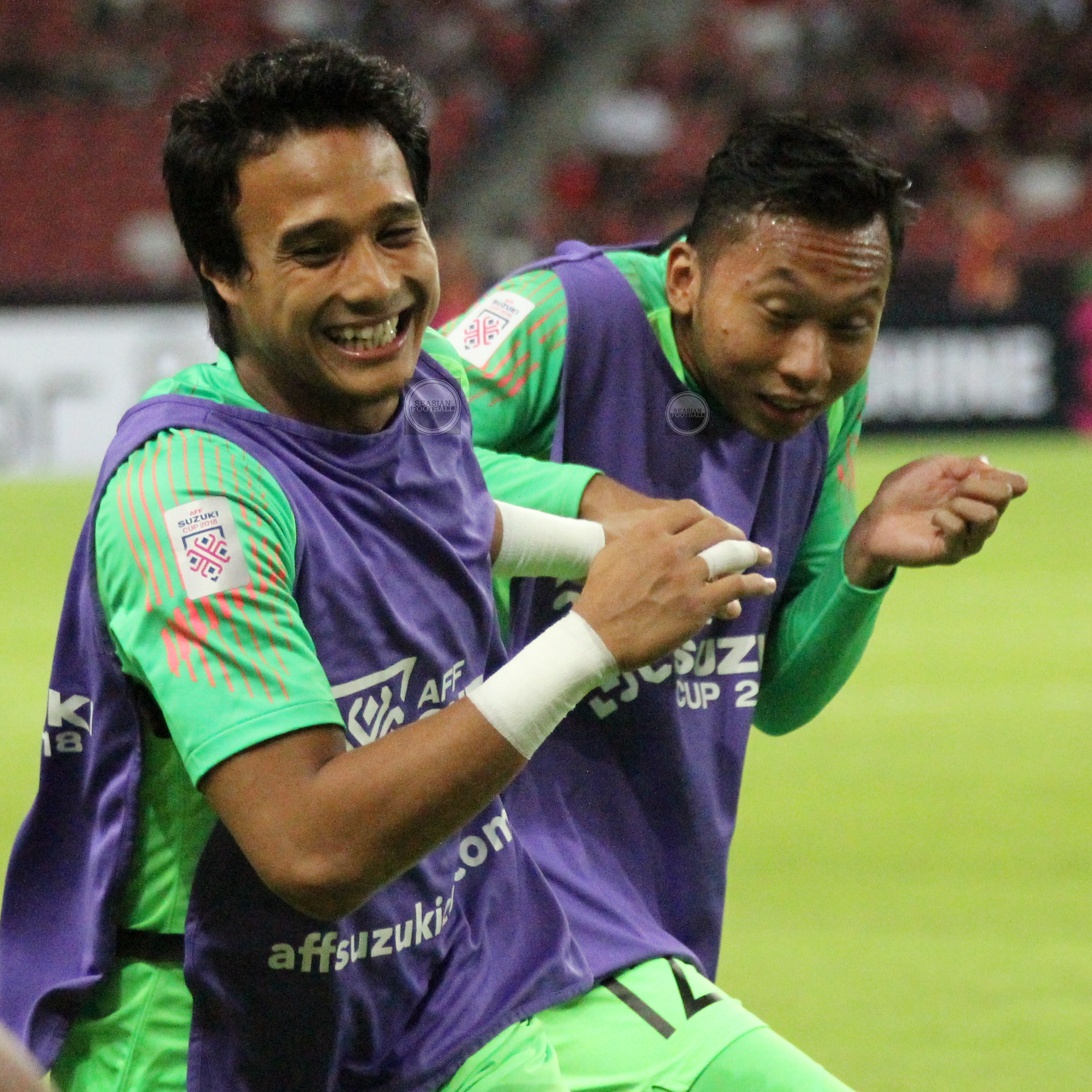
- Ridho and Awan Setho with Indonesia at the 2018 AFF Championship

Personal information
- Full name: Muhammad Ridho Djazulie
- Date of birth: 21 January 1991 (age 35)
- Place of birth: Pekalongan, Indonesia
- Height: 1.78 m (5 ft 10 in)
- Position: Goalkeeper

Team information
- Current team: Borneo Samarinda
- Number: 20

Senior career*
Years	Team	Apps	(Gls)
2010–2015	Persip Pekalongan	12	(0)
2012–2013	→ Persekabpur Purworejo (loan)	8	(0)
2015–2016	PS Bangka	0	(0)
2016–2018	Borneo Samarinda	53	(0)
2019–2022	Madura United	61	(0)
2022–2024	Bali United	26	(0)
2024–2026	Barito Putera	18	(0)
2026–	Borneo Samarinda	1	(0)

International career
2018–2019	Indonesia	3	(0)
- * Club domestic league appearances and goals as of 5 September 2026

Muhammad Ridho Djazulie (born 21 January 1991) is an Indonesian professional footballer who plays as a goalkeeper for Super League club Borneo Samarinda.

== Club career ==
=== Persip Pekalongan ===
Persip Pekalongan recruited Ridho in 2011–12 season, but they loan him to Persekabpur Purworejo. On 19 April 2013, Ridho made his competitive debut for Persip in the 2013 Liga Indonesia Premier Division against PSCS Cilacap, which ended in a 2–0 victory for opponent.

=== Borneo F.C. Samarinda ===
Ridho in 2018 signed a contract with Borneo Samarinda to play in Indonesia Soccer Championship A in 2016. He quickly rose as the team's starting goalkeeper, appearing in 53 matches in three seasons Indonesia Soccer Championship A and Liga 1.

=== Madura United F.C. ===
On 26 December 2018, Ridho signed for Indonesian Liga 1 club, Madura United. He made his league debut on 17 May 2019 in a match against Persela Lamongan at the Surajaya Stadium, Lamongan.

=== Bali United F.C. ===
On 4 May 2022, Ridho was officially introduced as Bali United new player. He made his league debut on 23 August 2022 in a match against Persib Bandung at the Gelora Bandung Lautan Api Stadium, Bandung.

== International career ==
Ridho made his debut for the Indonesia national team in a friendly match against Hong Kong on 16 October 2018.

== Career statistics ==
=== Club ===
As of match played 3 May 2026

Club statistics
Club	Season	League			Piala Indonesia		Asian		Other		Total	
Club	Season	Division	Apps	Goals	Apps	Goals	Apps	Goals	Apps	Goals	Apps	Goals
Persip Pekalongan	2011–12	Premier Division	0	0	—						0	0
Persip Pekalongan	2013	Premier Division	2	0	—						2	0
Persip Pekalongan	2014	Premier Division	10	0	—						10	0
Persip Pekalongan	2015	Premier Division	0	0	0	0	—				0	0
Persekabpur Purworejo (loan)	2012	Second Division	8	0	—						8	0
Borneo Samarinda	2016	ISC A	9	0	—						9	0
Borneo Samarinda	2017	Liga 1	14	0	—						14	0
Borneo Samarinda	2018	Liga 1	30	0	—						30	0
Madura United	2019	Liga 1	27	0	6	0	—				33	0
Madura United	2020	Liga 1	3	0	—						3	0
Madura United	2021–22	Liga 1	18	0	—				2 (Note: Appearances in Menpora Cup)	0	20	0
Bali United	2022–23	Liga 1	18	0	0	0	1 (Note: Appearances in AFC Cup)	0	2 (Note: Appearances in Indonesia President's Cup)	0	21	0
Bali United	2023–24	Liga 1	2	0	0	0	0	0	0	0	2	0
Barito Putera	2024–25	Liga 1	0	0	0	0	0	0	0	0	0	0
Barito Putera	2025–26	Championship	18	0	0	0	0	0	0	0	18	0
Career total			159	0	6	0	1	0	4	0	170	0

=== International ===
As of match played 20 November 2019

Appearances and goals by national team and year
National team	Year	Apps	Goals
Indonesia	2018	1	0
Indonesia	2019	2	0
Total		3	0
