= 2012 Liga Indonesia Second Division =

2012 Liga Indonesia Second Division may refer to:

- 2012 Liga Indonesia Second Division (BLAI), second-tier competition for amateur football clubs in Indonesia under controlled by KPSI and BLAI.
- 2012 Liga Amatir Indonesia Second Division, second-tier competition for amateur football clubs in Indonesia under controlled by PSSI.
