= 2017 Liga 3 South Kalimantan =

Liga 3 South Kalimantan
- Season: 2017
- Champions: Peseban Banjarmasin

The 2017 Liga 3 South Kalimantan is the third edition of Liga 3 South Kalimantan as a qualifying round for the national round of 2017 Liga 3. Perseban Banjarmasin are the defending champions.

The competition scheduled starts on 14 May 2017.

== Teams ==
There are 12 clubs which will participate the league in this season.

Group A
Peseban Banjarmasin
Persehan Marabahan
Persitam Tambarangan
Barabai FC

Group B
Persetab Tabalong
Gasib Barabai
PS Tapin
PS Talenta Banua Martapura

Group C
Persetala Tanah Laut
Persepan Pagatan
Persiko Kotabaru
PS Balangan
