= Persatu Tuban =

Indonesian football club

- Full name: Persatuan Sepakbola Tuban
- Nickname: Laskar Ronggolawe
- Short name: PTU; PSTU
- Founded: 17 October 1975; 50 years ago
- Ground: Bumi Wali Stadium; Tuban, East Java
- Capacity: 25,000
- Owner: PT. Persatu Tuban Putra
- Chairman: Eko Wahyudi
- Manager: Riyadi
- Coach: Vacant
- League: Liga 4
- 2023: 3rd in Group N, (East Java zone)
Home colours	Away colours

Persatuan Sepakbola Tuban, commonly known as Persatu Tuban or Persatu, is an Indonesian football club based in Tuban, East Java. They play in the Liga 4. Their nickname is Laskar Ronggolawe.

== History ==
Persatu Tuban became Liga Nusantara's first champion after beating Laga FC 2–1 in the final on December 14, 2014.

== Players ==
=== Current squad ===
As of 28 November 2025

Note: Flags indicate national team as defined under FIFA eligibility rules; some limited exceptions apply. Players may hold more than one non-FIFA nationality.

No.	Pos.	Nation	Player
2	DF	IDN	Adi Saputro
3	DF	IDN	M. Dharma Prasetyo Utomo
5	DF	IDN	Moh. Nazar Sahfudin
6	MF	IDN	Adrian Diaz Wardana
7	FW	IDN	Irsyanto Wandik
8	MF	IDN	Aldo Vernando
9	FW	IDN	Mochammad Fachrul Iffad
10	FW	IDN	Muchammad Dimas Saputra
12	DF	IDN	M. Nurul Fuadi
13	DF	IDN	Achmad Shadam
14	FW	IDN	Achmad Agung Alfarizi
15	FW	IDN	Muhammad Ardiansyah
16	MF	IDN	Jatmaka Irza Alhamdah

No.	Pos.	Nation	Player
17	FW	IDN	Antok Mei Triyatmono
19	FW	IDN	Egik Apriansyah
21	FW	IDN	Syafiq Maulana Azzahi
23	DF	IDN	Renggy Aulia Felixiano
26	MF	IDN	Andrian Arjunanto
27	FW	IDN	Rezza Maulana Fahrullah
28	GK	IDN	Dhiva Sura
31	DF	IDN	M. Kuswanto
33	GK	IDN	Wahyu Anggara Indra Tanaya
36	MF	IDN	Rio Ferdinand
71	DF	IDN	Muhammad Rizqi Akbar Fernanda
81	GK	IDN	Rafi Ardiono

== Season-by-season records ==
Season	League	Tier	Tms.	Pos.	Piala Indonesia
2010–11	Third Division	5		Promoted	–
2012	Second Division (LPIS)	4	100	Promoted	–
2013	First Division	3	77	Second round	–
2014	First Division	3	73	2nd, Fourth round	–
2014	Liga Nusantara	3	32	1	–
2015	Premier Division	2	55	did not finish	–
2016	Indonesia Soccer Championship B	2	53	4th, Group 6	–
2017	Liga 2	2	61	5th, Group 5	–
2018	Liga 3	3	32	2nd, Third round	First round
2019	Liga 2	2	23	11th, East division	First round
2020	Liga 3	3	season abandoned		–
2021–22	Liga 3	3	64	Eliminated in Provincial round	–
2022–23	Liga 3	3	season abandoned		–
2023–24	Liga 3	3	80	Eliminated in Provincial round	–
2024–25					

== Honours ==
- Liga Nusantara
  - Champion (1): 2014
