= RANS Nusantara F.C. =

Indonesian football club

RANS Nusantara
- Full name: RANS Nusantara Football Club
- Nicknames: The Prestige Phoenix; The Magenta Force
- Short name: RFC; RAN
- Founded: 21 November 2012; 13 years ago (as Cilegon United); 31 March 2021 (as RANS Cilegon); 30 May 2022 (as RANS Nusantara)
- Stadium: Kanjuruhan Stadium
- Owner: RANS Entertainment
- Chairman: Raffi Ahmad
- Head coach: Kas Hartadi
- League: Championship
- 2025–26: Liga Nusantara, Champions (promoted)
- Website: rans-nusantara-fc.id
Home colours	Away colours

RANS Nusantara Football Club (formerly known as Cilegon United and RANS Cilegon) is an Indonesian football club based in Malang Regency, East Java. RANS Nusantara compete in the Championship, the second tier of Indonesian football, and play their home matches at Kanjuruhan Stadium, having moved there from Batu for the 2026–27 season. The club is nicknamed The Magenta Force and The Prestige Phoenix.

The club was founded in 2012 as Cilegon United in Cilegon, Banten, and won the Second Division in 2013 and the First Division in 2014. In 2021 it was acquired by RANS Entertainment, an entertainment company owned by Raffi Ahmad and Nagita Slavina, and the supercar dealership Prestige Motorcars, and renamed RANS Cilegon. The club finished as runners-up in the 2021–22 Liga 2, earning promotion to Liga 1, and adopted its current name in 2022. After two seasons in Liga 1 it was relegated in 2024, and it was relegated again from Liga 2 in 2025. RANS Nusantara won the 2025–26 Liga Nusantara to return to the second tier after a single season in the third.

== History ==
=== Cilegon United (2012–2020) ===
The club was founded in 2012 as Cilegon United Football Club in Cilegon, Banten. It won the 2013 Second Division and the 2014 First Division in consecutive seasons, and the resulting promotions took it to the second tier. Cilegon United remained at that level until its acquisition in 2021, although its 2015 and 2020 seasons were not completed. Kas Hartadi was head coach from 2014 to 2017.

=== RANS takeover and promotion (2021–22) ===
On 31 March 2021, Cilegon United was acquired by RANS Entertainment, a company owned by Raffi Ahmad and Nagita Slavina, and Prestige Motorcars, a supercar dealership in North Jakarta, and renamed RANS Cilegon Football Club. RANS Cilegon began the 2021–22 Liga 2, then the second tier, on 28 September 2021 with a 3–1 defeat to Dewa United at the Gelora Bung Karno Madya Stadium. They finished second in their first-round group, Group B, after a 3–0 win over PSKC Cimahi on 1 December, and topped Group X in the second round after a 0–0 draw with Sriwijaya on 22 December. Five days later, a 3–0 semi-final win over PSIM Yogyakarta secured promotion to Liga 1, then the top tier, but RANS Cilegon lost the final 2–1 to Persis Solo on 30 December and finished as runners-up. On 30 May 2022, at the 2022 PSSI Ordinary Congress in Bandung, the club was renamed RANS Nusantara Football Club.

=== Liga 1 (2022–24) ===
In the 2022–23 Liga 1, RANS Nusantara finished bottom of the 18-team table with 19 points from 34 matches, having won three, drawn ten and lost 21. They avoided relegation because the Liga 2 season was halted after the Kanjuruhan Stadium disaster: no club was promoted, and the league operator did not apply relegation that season.

In the 2023–24 season, RANS Nusantara finished 16th, with eight wins, 11 draws and 15 defeats, and were relegated to the Liga 2 after two seasons in the top tier. They did not win any of their last 18 matches.

=== Relegation and return to the Championship (2024–present) ===
In the 2024–25 Liga 2, RANS Nusantara finished bottom of the relegation round and were relegated to the third tier, Liga Nusantara, after one season in the second tier. The club moved its home base to Batu, East Java, ahead of the 2025–26 season.

In the 2025–26 Liga Nusantara, Kas Hartadi, on loan from PSMS Medan, where he was technical director, took over as head coach before the knockout stage. RANS Nusantara beat Persiba Bantul 2–1 in the semi-finals to secure promotion to the Championship. They won the title on 8 February 2026, beating Dejan 4–3 on penalties after the final at Sriwedari Stadium in Surakarta ended 2–2 after extra time. RANS Nusantara entered the 2026–27 Championship with Hartadi, who had also coached the club when it was Cilegon United, as head coach and Kanjuruhan Stadium in Malang Regency as its home ground.

== Stadium ==
As Cilegon United, the club played at Krakatau Steel Stadium in Cilegon. It has changed home base several times since, playing in Cilegon, Bogor and Bantul before moving to Batu in 2025. In Batu, the club planned to use Brantas Stadium, which it was to share with the local Liga 4 side Persikoba Batu.

For the 2026–27 season, RANS Nusantara announced Kanjuruhan Stadium in Malang Regency, which is also the home ground of Arema, as its new home. Club management said it chose the stadium because it is the closest to Batu, where the team had prepared during the previous season.

== Supporters ==
RANS Nusantara's supporters are known as Boys of RANS. When the club changed its name in 2022, its operations director, Darius Sinathrya, said the aim was to widen its supporter base to include fans of Raffi Ahmad, followers of football in Cilegon and supporters elsewhere in Indonesia.

== Mascot ==
The club's mascot is a phoenix wearing a white club jersey. Its head, body and the bases of its wings and tail are magenta, the tips of its crest, wings and tail shade into blue, and its legs are orange.

== Players ==
=== Current squad ===
As of September 2026

Note: Flags indicate national team as defined under FIFA eligibility rules; some limited exceptions apply. Players may hold more than one non-FIFA nationality.

No.	Pos.	Nation	Player
3	DF	IDN	Bayu Aji
9	FW	NOR	Martin Hoel Andersen
10	MF	IDN	Muhammad Rafli
11	DF	IDN	Daniel Alfrido
12	FW	IDN	Aqsa Aqyuba
13	MF	IDN	Sultan Akbar
14	GK	IDN	Davin Prasetiyo
16	MF	IDN	Refan Nadief
17	DF	IDN	Dandy Aryanto
18	MF	IDN	Aswin
20	GK	IDN	Ditea Dwi Cahya
21	FW	IDN	Dirk Lukas Auri
22	MF	IDN	Dias Angga Putra
23	FW	IDN	Rendi Irawan
24	DF	SSD	Amanhom Khamis
26	GK	IDN	Andrika Fathir

No.	Pos.	Nation	Player
27	FW	IDN	Dedik Setiawan
28	DF	IDN	Alfharidz Shobirin
29	MF	MLI	Ladji Mallé
31	MF	IDN	Rosad Setiawan
48	DF	IDN	Achmad Faris
72	DF	IDN	Bayu Setiawan (on loan from Arema)
77	DF	IDN	Iqbal Nugraha
79	MF	IDN	Raya Sheva Pradana
87	DF	IDN	Almaghfiru Inzaghi
88	MF	IDN	Vikrian Akbar
89	MF	IDN	Lee Yu-jun
95	GK	IDN	Adrian Casvari
99	FW	IDN	Racksa Surya

== Management ==
=== Coaching staff ===
Position	Name
Team manager	Hifrery Laksana Ugama
Assistant team manager	Mohammad Suhaimi
Head coach	Kas Hartadi
Assistant coach	Sunardi
Assistant coach	Juan Revi
Goalkeeper coach	Hendry
Fitness coach	Indra Ramdhani

=== Head coaches ===
Period	Name
2013	(Indonesia) Elie Suheili
2013–2014	(Indonesia) Bambang Nurdiansyah
2014–2017	(Indonesia) Kas Hartadi
2017	(Moldova) Arcan Iurie
2017–2018	(Indonesia) Imam Riyadi
2018	(Indonesia) Sasi Kirono
2019	(Indonesia) Bambang Nurdiansyah
2019	(Indonesia) Imam Riyadi
2020	(Indonesia) Herry Kiswanto
2021	(Indonesia) Bambang Nurdiansyah
2021–2023	(Indonesia) Rahmad Darmawan
2023	(Brazil) Rodrigo Santana
2023–2024	(Portugal) Eduardo Almeida
2024	(Argentina) Ángel Alfredo Vera
2024–2025	(Indonesia) Edi Sudiarto
2025–2026	(Indonesia) Joko Susilo
2026–	(Indonesia) Kas Hartadi

== Season-by-season records ==
=== As Cilegon United ===
Cilegon United, 2012–2020
Season	League/Division	Teams	Position	Piala Indonesia
2012	Second Division (LPIS)	100	Withdrew	–
2013	Second Division	73	1st	–
2014	First Division	73	1st	–
2015	Premier Division	55	Did not finish	–
2016	Indonesia Soccer Championship B	53	3rd, first round	–
2017	Liga 2	61	4th, second round	–
2018	Liga 2	24	8th, West division	Round of 32
2019	Liga 2	23	7th, West division	Round of 32
2020	Liga 2	24	Did not finish	–

=== As RANS Cilegon and RANS Nusantara ===
RANS Cilegon and RANS Nusantara, 2021–present
Season	League/Division	Teams	Position	Notes
2021–22	Liga 2	24	2nd	Competed as RANS Cilegon; promoted to Liga 1
2022–23	Liga 1	18	18th	Not relegated
2023–24	Liga 1	18	16th	Relegated to Liga 2
2024–25	Liga 2	26	5th, relegation round	Relegated to Liga Nusantara
2025–26	Liga Nusantara	24	1st	Promoted to the Championship
2026–27	Championship	20	TBD	

== Honours ==
=== As Cilegon United ===
- Liga Indonesia First Division
  - Champions: 2014
- Liga Indonesia Second Division
  - Champions: 2013

=== As RANS Cilegon and RANS Nusantara ===
- Liga 2
  - Runners-up: 2021–22
- Liga Nusantara
  - Champions: 2025–26

== See also ==
- RANS Simba Bogor
