= Piani =

District in South Kalimantan Province, Indonesia

Piani is a district (kecamatan) in Tapin Regency in the Indonesian province of South Kalimantan. As of the 2020 census, it had a population of 5,770 and an area of 190 km^{2}; the official estimate as at mid 2023 was 6,334.
