= Persebsi Sibolga =

Indonesian football club

Persebsi
- Full name: Persatuan Sepakbola Sibolga
- Nickname: The White Shark of West Coast
- Founded: 2008; 18 years ago
- Ground: Horas Stadium; Sibolga, North Sumatra
- Capacity: 5,000
- Owner: Sibolga City Government
- Chairman: M. Yusuf Batubara
- Manager: Hendra Sahputra
- Coach: Vacant
- League: Liga 4
Home colours	Away colours

Persatuan Sepakbola Sibolga (simply known as Persebsi) is an Indonesian football club based in Sibolga, North Sumatra. They currently compete in Liga 4 North Sumatra zone.

== Stadium ==
Persebsi is based at Horas Stadium in Sibolga. This stadium has been standing since the 1980s, where it became a silent witness to the club's glory days until it competed in First Division.

== Honours ==
- Liga Indonesia Third Division North Sumatra
  - Champion (1): 2006
