= ISP Purworejo =

Indonesian football club

- Full name: Ikatan Sepakbola Purworejo
- Nicknames: Bagelen Warriors; The Java Goats
- Short name: ISP
- Founded: 1954; 72 years ago
- Ground: WR Soepratman Stadium; Purworejo, Central Java
- Capacity: 10,000
- Owner: Askab PSSI Purworejo
- Chairman: Angko Setiyarso Widodo
- Manager: Rohman Supriyadi
- Coach: Arifin Puji
- League: Liga 4
- 2021: 6th in Group D (Central Java zone)
Home colours	Away colours	Third colours

Ikatan Sepakbola Purworejo, simply known as ISP, is an Indonesian football club based in Purworejo Regency, Central Java. They currently compete in the Liga 4 Central Java zone.

== History ==
ISP Purworejo is a member of PSSI Central Java Province Association. Since the 2010s, ISP Purworejo only played at junior-level competitions, Soeratin Cup (U-18). In 2021, they also competed in Liga 3 and had a target to be a professional club. They competed at the first-tier league in Indonesia, Liga 1.

During the Soeratin Cup, ISP had no achievements. The best achievement was in 1986. ISP qualified to Zone VI (Central Java-Yogyakarta). However, in the final, they were defeated by Persipur Purwodadi and failed to advance to the final round played in Jakarta.

ISP participation in Division Three was the first time and carve performance is quite encouraging. Persekabpur is ranked 3rd and promotion to Division Two.

== Season-by-season records ==
Season	League/division	Tms.	Pos.	Piala Indonesia
2010–11	Third Division	78	Semi-finalist	–
2013	First Division	77	5th, first round	–
2014	First Division	73	6th, first round	–
2015				
2016
2017
2018
2019
2020	Liga 3	Season abandoned		–
2021–22	Liga 3	64	Eliminated in provincial round	–
2022–23	Liga 3	Season abandoned		–
2023–24				
2024–25
2025–26	Liga 4	64	Eliminated in provincial round	–
