= Persikalis Bengkalis =

Indonesian football club

Persikalis
- Full name: Persatuan Sepakbola Indonesia Bengkalis
- Nicknames: Ikan Terubuk; Mahkota Hulubalang (The Warlord's Crown)
- Founded: 2007; 19 years ago
- Ground: Muhammad Ali Stadium; Bengkalis
- Capacity: 15,000
- Owner: Askab PSSI Bengkalis
- Chairman: Darma Firdaus
- Manager: Ari Chandra
- League: Liga 3
- 2023: 4th in Group B, (Riau Zone)
Home colours	Away colours	Third colours

Persatuan Sepakbola Indonesia Bengkalis (simply known as Persikalis) is an Indonesian football club based in Bengkalis, Riau. They currently compete in the Liga 3 and their homebase is Muhammad Ali Stadium.
