= Persiko Kotabaru =

Indonesian football club

Persiko
- Full name: Persatuan Sepakbola Indonesia Kotabaru
- Nickname: Ikan Todak (The Swordfish)
- Founded: 1967; 59 years ago
- Ground: Bamega Stadium
- Capacity: 10,000
- Owner: Kotabaru Regency government
- Chairman: Hardiyandi SH
- League: Liga 4
- 2017: Group stage, (South Kalimantan zone)
Home colours	Away colours

Persatuan Sepakbola Indonesia Kotabaru (simply known as Persiko) is an Indonesian football club based in Kotabaru Regency, South Kalimantan. This club played in Liga 4 South Kalimantan zone.

== Honours ==
- Liga Indonesia Third Division
  - Runner-up (1): 2006
