= Persikoban Banjar =

Indonesian football club

Persikoban
- Full name: Persatuan Sepakbola Indonesia Kota Banjar
- Nickname: Laskar Rawa Onom
- Founded: 2003; 23 years ago
- Ground: Gelora Banjar Patroman Stadium; Banjar, West Java
- Capacity: 3.000
- Chairman: Askot PSSI Kota Banjar
- Manager: Hidayat Maulana
- Coach: Agus Santiko
- League: Liga 3
- 2021: Withdraw
Home colours	Away colours

Persatuan Sepakbola Indonesia Kota Banjar (simply known as Persikoban) is an Indonesian association football club from Banjar, West Java. Persikoban plays in Liga 3.
