= Jakarta Matador F.C. =

Indonesian football club

Jakarta Matador FC
- Full name: Jakarta Matador Football Club
- Nickname: JMFC
- Founded: 21 April 2005; 21 years ago, as PS Markuban Jambi
- Ground: Nurhanudin Yonzikon 14 / SWC Field; South Jakarta, Jakarta
- Owner: Heru Pujihartono
- Chairman: Heru Pujihartono
- Coach: Lapril A.S
- League: Liga 3
- 2014: First Division, 5th in First Round of Group E
- Website: http://www.jakartamatadorfc.co.id/online/
Home colours	Away colours	Third colours

Jakarta Matador Football Club was an Indonesian football club based in South Jakarta. They compete in the Liga 3.

== History ==
The club was founded on 21 April 2005 as the Markuban Football Association. On 17 October 2005, the club was accepted as a member of the Football Association of Indonesia.

In the 2013 season, the club played in the first division after acquiring PS Markuban, a football team from Jambi, and the club temporarily changed its name to become Markuban Matador FC.

== Club officials ==
Source:Bagan Pengurus Klub

- Owner: Heru Pujihartono

=== Matador Limited ===
- Chairman: Heru Pujihartono
- Executive vice chairman: Rully Suwandi
- Chief operating officer: Wisnu Wibowo
- Director of corporate development: Ichwan Hasbi, SE

=== Matador Football Club ===
- Directors: Heru Pujihartono
- Chief operating officer: Wisnu Wibowo
- Treasurer: Ichwan Hasbi, SE
- Media officer: Muhammad Rusjdi

=== Coaching and medical staff ===
- Head coach: Lapril A.S
- Assistant Manager: E Lexius Malau
- Nutritionists: Jaka Zulkarnaen
