= Persikota Tidore =

Indonesian football club

Persikota
- Full name: Persatuan Sepakbola Indonesia Kota Tidore
- Nickname: Laskar Gurabati (Gurabati Warriors)
- Founded: 2003; 23 years ago
- Ground: Marimoi Stadium; Tidore, North Maluku
- Capacity: 5,000
- Owner: PSSI Tidore Islands
- Chairman: Junaidi Saleh
- Manager: Muhammad Sinen
- Coach: Hasan Soleman
- League: Liga 4
- 2019: 3rd, (North Maluku zone)
Home colours	Away colours

Persatuan Sepakbola Indonesia Kota Tidore, simply known as Persikota, is an Indonesian football club based in Tidore, North Maluku. They currently compete in the Liga 4 and their home stadium is Marimoi Stadium.

== History ==
Founded in 2003, this club has a supporter group called Poram Mareku. Throughout its history, Persikota has only been able to play in the lower divisions of the Indonesian league system. They competes in local rivalry with Persiter Ternate, the best football club in North Maluku. Several clashes have occurred between supporters of the two clubs.
