= Persikokot Kotamobagu =

Indonesian football club

Persikokot
- Full name: Perserikatan Sepakbola Indonesia Kota Kotamobagu
- Nickname: Laskar Tarsius
- Founded: 2007; 19 years ago
- Ground: Nunuk Matali Stadium; Kotamobagu, North Sulawesi
- Capacity: 2,000
- Owner: PSSI Kotamobagu City
- Manager: Anugrah Begie Gobel
- Coach: Firman Usman
- League: Liga 4
- 2021: Quarter-finals, (Liga 3 North Sulawesi zone)
| Home colours | Away colours |

Perserikatan Sepakbola Indonesia Kota Kotamobagu (simply known as Persikokot) is an Indonesian football club based in Kotamobagu, North Sulawesi. Their currently plays at Liga 4 and their home stadium is the Nunuk Matali Stadium.
