= PS Batam =

Indonesian football club

- Full name: Persatuan Sepakbola Batam
- Nicknames: Kalajengking Barelang (Barelang Scorpions)
- Founded: 1974; 52 years ago
- Ground: Batu Besar Stadium
- Capacity: 10,000
- Owner: PSSI Batam City
- Chairman: Aris Hardy Halim
- Manager: Mulyadi
- Coach: Budi Sudarsono
- League: Liga 4
- 2019: 2nd (Liga 3 Riau Islands)
Home colours	Away colours

Persatuan Sepakbola Batam, commonly known as PS Batam, is an Indonesian football club based in Batam, Riau Islands. They currently compete in the Liga 4 Riau Islands zone.

== History ==
Founded in 1974, make them the oldest football club in Riau Islands. In 1994, they became champions of the Liga Indonesia Third Division for the first time. They almost achieved promotion to the Liga Indonesia Premier Division in 2014, but failed to achieve promotion, finishing 4th in Group 12.

They failed to representing Riau Islands in 2019 Liga 3 Regional round after losing to 757 Kepri Jaya in the penalty shootout. After participating in the competition, during the 2021–2025 period of the PSSI Batam City management, this club was on hiatus from official PSSI competitions.
