= Persesa Sampang =

Association football team in Indonesia

- Full name: Persatuan Sepakbola Sampang
- Nickname(s): Laskar Trunojoyo (Trunojoyo Warriors)
- Founded: 2001; 24 years ago
- Ground: Wijaya Kusuma Stadium; Sampang, Madura Island, East Java
- Capacity: 15,000
- Owner: Askab PSSI Sampang
- Chairman: Abdullah Hidayat
- Manager: Nurul Huda
- Coach: Haris Riyanto
- League: Liga 4
- 2024–25: Round of 32, (East Java zone)
Home colours	Away colours

Persatuan Sepakbola Sampang (simply known as Persesa Sampang) is an Indonesian football club based in Sampang Regency, East Java. They currently compete in the Liga 4.
