= PS PPU Penajam North Paser =

Indonesian football club

PS Penajam Paser Utara
- Full name: Persatuan Sepakbola Penajam Paser Utara
- Nickname: The Golden Stags
- Ground: Nipahnipah Stadium; Penajam North Paser Regency, East Kalimantan
- Capacity: 10,000
- Owner: Penajam North Paser Government
- Chairman: H. Andi Harahap
- Coach: Vacant
- League: Liga 3
- 2014: First Division, 4th in Second Round of Group Q
Home colours	Away colours

Persatuan Sepakbola Penajam Paser Utara (simply known as PS PPU) is an Indonesian football club based in Penajam North Paser Regency, East Kalimantan. Club played in Liga 3.
