= Persipas Paser =

Indonesian football club

Persipas
- Full name: Persatuan Sepakbola Indonesia Paser
- Nickname: Lebah Madu
- Ground: Sadurengas Stadium, Tana Paser, Paser, East Kalimantan
- Owner: PT. Kideco Jaya Agung
- Chairman: Jumriansyah
- Coach: Vacant
- League: Liga 3
- 2013: Premier Division, Withdraw (relegated)
Home colours	Away colours

Persatuan Sepakbola Indonesia Paser (simply known as Persipas) is an Indonesian football club based in Paser Regency, East Kalimantan. They currently played in Liga 4 East Kalimantan zone.
