= PSKB Bukittinggi =

Indonesian football club

- Full name: Persatuan Sepakbola Kota Bukittinggi
- Nicknames: Pandeka Agam Tuo (Old Agam Warriors); Pandeka Jagad (Jam Gadang Warriors)
- Short name: PSKB
- Ground: Ateh Ngarai Stadium; Bukittinggi
- Capacity: 5,000
- Owner: Askot PSSI Bukittinggi
- Chairman: Andi Putra
- Coach: Gusnedi Adang
- League: Liga 4
- 2023–24: 4th, Group D (West Sumatra)
Home colours	Away colours

Persatuan Sepakbola Kota Bukittinggi (also known as PSKB Bukittinggi) is an Indonesian football club based in Bukittinggi, West Sumatra. They currently compete in the Liga 4.

== Honours ==
- Liga 3 West Sumatra
  - Champion (1): 2021
