= Persifa Fakfak =

Indonesian football club

Persifa
- Full name: Persatuan Sepakbola Indonesia Fakfak
- Nickname: Laskar Batu Api
- Founded: 1973; 53 years ago
- Ground: 16 November Stadium; Fakfak, West Papua
- Capacity: 5,000
- Owner: PSSI Fakfak Regency
- Manager: Piter Letsoin
- Coach: Mohammad Uswanas
- League: Liga 4
- 2021: 3rd in Group A, (Liga 3 West Papua zone)
Home colours	Away colours

Persatuan Sepakbola Indonesia Fakfak, commonly known as Persifa, is an Indonesian football club based in Fakfak Regency, West Papua. They currently compete in the Liga 4 West Papua zone.

== Season-by-season records ==
=== Records ===
Season	League										Piala Indonesia
Season	Comp.		App.	W	D	L	GF	GA	Pts.	Pos.	Piala Indonesia
2010–11	Second Division	First round	1	0	0	1	1	2	0	2nd, Group XVI	—
2010–11	Second Division	Second round	2	0	1	1	3	4	1	3rd, Group J	—
2025–26	Liga 4 (West Papua)		3	0	0	3	3	8	0	4th	not held

Champion	Runner-up	Promotion	Relegation

=== Season-by-season ===
Season(s)	Tier	Division	Place	Piala Indonesia
2025–26	4	L4	eliminated in provincial phase	—

- 1 season in Liga 4
