= Persias Asmat =

Indonesian football club

Persias
- Full name: Persatuan Sepakbola Indonesia Asmat
- Nickname: Laskar Udang Tanah
- Ground: Yos Sudarso Field; Asmat Regency, South Papua, Indonesia
- Capacity: 1,000
- Owner: Asmat Regency Government
- Manager: Marius Ohoiwutun
- Coach: Vibert Kamayop
- League: Liga 4
- 2010: 3rd, first stage in Group XI (First Division)
Home colours	Away colours

Persatuan Sepakbola Indonesia Asmat (simply known as Persias) is an Indonesian football club based in Asmat Regency, South Papua. They currently compete in Liga 4 South Papua zone.
