= PS Pidie Jaya =

Indonesian football club

- Full name: Persatuan Sepakbola Pidie Jaya
- Nickname: Laskar Po Meurah
- Founded: 2007; 19 years ago
- Ground: Kuta Asan Stadium; Pidie Regency, Aceh
- Capacity: 25,000
- Owner: PSSI Pidie Jaya
- Chairman: M. Zakaria
- League: Liga 4
- 2019: Provincial stage (Liga 3 Aceh), did not qualify to national round
Home colours	Away colours

Persatuan Sepakbola Pidie Jaya, commonly known as PS Pidie Jaya, is an Indonesian football club based in Pidie Jaya Regency, Aceh. They currently compete in Liga 4 Aceh zone.

== Honours ==
- ISC Liga Nusantara Aceh
  - Champion (1): 2016
