= Persinga Ngawi =

Indonesian football club

- Full name: Persatuan Sepak Bola Indonesia Ngawi
- Nickname: Laskar Alas Ketonggo
- Founded: 1958; 68 years ago
- Ground: Ketonggo Stadium; Ngawi (town), Ngawi, Indonesia
- Capacity: 10,000
- Owner: Pemkab Ngawi (PT. Persinga Jaya)
- Chairman: Dwi Rianto Jatmiko
- Head coach: Moch Fachruddin
- League: Liga Nusantara
- 2025–26: 4th (East Java zone); Semi-finalist (promoted)
Home colours	Away colours

Persatuan Sepak Bola Indonesia Ngawi, commonly known as Persinga Ngawi is a football club based in Ngawi, Ngawi Regency, Indonesia. Their nickname is "Laskar Alas Ketonggo". Persinga competes in the Liga Nusantara from 2026–27 season, following their promotion from the Liga 4 in 2025–26. Persinga's home ground is known as Ketonggo Stadium.

In 2013 Liga Indonesia First Division, Persinga Ngawi become runners-up after 0–1 loss against PS Kwarta, making it best achievement in club's history.

== Players ==
=== Current squad ===
Note: Flags indicate national team as defined under FIFA eligibility rules; some limited exceptions apply. Players may hold more than one non-FIFA nationality.

No.	Pos.	Nation	Player
1	GK	IDN	Ichsan Chasan Sidiq
2	GK	IDN	Muhammad Rafhi
3	DF	IDN	Eko Tri Prakoso
4	DF	IDN	Mochammad
5	DF	IDN	Jofan Adam
6	MF	IDN	Pinggih Satria
7	FW	IDN	Slamet Hariyadi
8	MF	IDN	Harits Luqmanul Azhar
9	FW	IDN	Kristiyono
10	FW	IDN	Isnaini Luthfi
11	DF	IDN	Tegar Wijaya Kusuma
13	MF	IDN	Nova Mutaqim
14	DF	IDN	Reza Fauzan
15	MF	IDN	Ayuep Yulianto
16	DF	IDN	David Usman
17	MF	IDN	Dwi Cahyono

No.	Pos.	Nation	Player
18	MF	IDN	Muhammad Idris
19	DF	IDN	Ragil Setyawan
20	DF	IDN	Arfamuzi
21	GK	IDN	Guntur Wibowo
22	MF	IDN	Raka Syafiq
23	MF	IDN	Ahmad Ichwanul Kafi
24	DF	IDN	Hafis Al Barkah
27	DF	IDN	Rio Fernanda
28	DF	IDN	Harris Adyatama
29	DF	IDN	Rovario Khogus
31	FW	IDN	Riski Median Nanda
33	DF	IDN	Yoga Prasetya
72	GK	IDN	Daniswhara Rajendra

== Coaching staff ==
As of 4 January 2025

Position	Staff
Head coach	(Indonesia) Moch Fachrudin
Assistant coach	(Indonesia) Ichawan Wicaksana
Assistant coach	(Indonesia) Sigit Wicaksana
Goalkeeper coach	(Indonesia) Lambang mulyono

== Season-by-season records ==
Season(s)	League/Division	Tier	Tms.	Pos.	Piala Indonesia	AFC/AFF competition(s)	
2023–24	Liga 3	3	80		–	–	–
2024–25	Liga 4	4	64	3rd in Third round	–	–	–
2025–26	Liga 4	4	64		–	–	–
2026–27	Liga Nusantara	3	24	TBD	–	–	–

== Honours ==
- Liga Indonesia First Division
  - Runners-up (1): 2013
