= Persiks Kuantan Singingi =

Indonesian football club

Persiks
- Full name: Persatuan Sepakbola Indonesia Kuantan Singingi
- Nicknames: Laskar Koto Alang (Koto Alang Warrior); Angsa Putih (The White Swan)
- Founded: 1999; 27 years ago
- Ground: Kuantan Singingi Sport Center Stadium; Kuantan Singingi, Riau
- Capacity: 30,000
- Owner: Kuantan Singingi Regency Government
- Manager: Firdaus Oemar
- Coach: Suherman Yusuf
- League: Liga 4
Home colours	Away colours

Persatuan Sepakbola Indonesia Kuantan Singingi, commonly known as Persiks, is an Indonesian football club based in Kuantan Singingi Regency, Riau. This club played at Liga 4 Riau zone.
