= Persada Southwest Aceh =

Indonesian football club in Aceh

Persada
- Full name: Persatuan Sepakbola Aceh Barat Daya
- Nickname: Laskar Teungku Pekan
- Ground: Persada Stadium; Blangpidie, Southwest Aceh, Aceh
- Capacity: 5,000
- Owner: Askab PSSI Aceh Barat Daya
- Chairman: Romi Syahputra
- Manager: Sahlan Sabri
- Coach: Rahmat Fitra
- League: Liga 4
- 2019: Liga 3, eliminated in provincial stage
Home colours	Away colours

Persatuan Sepakbola Aceh Barat Daya (simply known as Persada Abdya or Persada) is an Indonesian football club based in Southwest Aceh Regency, Aceh. They currently compete in the Liga 4 and their home ground is Guhang Raya Stadium.
