= PSISra Sragen =

Indonesian football club

- Full name: Persatuan Sepakbola Indonesia Sragen
- Nicknames: Singo Sragen; Laskar Sukowati
- Founded: 1980; 46 years ago
- Ground: Taruna Stadium; Sragen, Central Java
- Capacity: 5,000
- Owner: Sragen Regency Government
- Chairman: Mulyanto
- Coach: Darwanto
- League: Liga 4
- 2019: 4th in Group 3, (Central Java zone)
Home colours	Away colours

PSISra stands for Persatuan Sepakbola Indonesia Sragen (en: Football Association of Indonesia Sragen). PSISra Sragen is an Indonesian football club based in Sragen Regency, Central Java. Club played in Liga 4.

== Season-by-season records ==
Season(s)	League/Division	Tms.	Pos.	Piala Indonesia
2010–11	Second Division	78	3rd, Second round	–
2011–12	First Division	66	5th, First stage	–
2013	First Division	77	4th, First round	–
2014	First Division	73	3rd, First round	–
2015	Liga Nusantara	season abandoned		–
2016				
2017	Liga 3	32	Eliminated in Provincial round	–
2018				
2019	Liga 3	32	Eliminated in Provincial round	–
2020				
2021–22
2022–23
2023–24
2024–25
2025–26
