= Persip Pasee =

Indonesian football club

- Full name: Persatuan Sepakbola Indonesia Pasee
- Nickname: Malaka Warriors
- Founded: 1998; 28 years ago
- Ground: Krueng Mane Stadium; North Aceh, Aceh
- Capacity: 8,000
- Owner: Askab PSSI Aceh Utara
- Chairman: H. Ade Zulfadhli
- Manager: Mulyadi; Bil Razi
- Coach: Syamsul Bahri
- League: Liga 4
- 2021: Semi-finals, (Aceh zone)
| Home colours | Away colours | Third colours |

Persatuan Sepakbola Indonesia Pasee (simply known as Persip Pasee) is an Indonesian football club based in North Aceh Regency, Aceh. They currently compete in the Liga 4.
