= PS TGM Medan =

Indonesian football club

- Full name: Persatuan Sepakbola Thamrin Graha Metropolitan Medan
- Nicknames: Red and White Team
- Founded: 2002; 24 years ago
- Ground: Teladan Stadium
- Capacity: 15,000
- Owner: PT. Thamrin Graha Metropolitan
- Chairman: Husein Thamrin
- Coach: Syamsir Alamsyah
- League: Liga 4
- 2023: 3rd in Group F, (North Sumatra zone)
Home colours	Away colours

Persatuan Sepakbola Thamrin Graha Metropolitan Medan (simply known as PS TGM Medan) is an Indonesian football club based in Medan, North Sumatra. They currently compete in the Liga 4.

TGM Medan stadium named Teladan Stadium. Its location is in downtown Medan. The club is nicknamed the Red and White Team (Indonesian: Tim Merah dan Putih) because of the colors of their uniforms and their logo.

== Honours ==
- Liga Indonesia Third Division
  - Runner-up (1): 2010–11
