= PSKT Tomohon =

Indonesian football club

PSKT
- Full name: Persatuan Sepakbola Kota Tomohon
- Nickname: Bunga Berduri (The Thorny Flower)
- Short name: PSKT
- Founded: 1999; 27 years ago
- Ground: Stadion Parasamya Walian Tomohon; Tomohon, North Sulawesi
- Capacity: 5,000
- Owner: Tomohon City Government
- Chairman: Caroll Senduk
- Manager: Gerard Lapian
- Coach: Nolvi Tumiwa
- League: Liga 4
- 2024–25: 4th, (North Sulawesi zone)
Home colours	Away colours

Persatuan Sepakbola Kota Tomohon (simply known as PSKT) is an Indonesian football club based in Tomohon, North Sulawesi. Club played in Liga 4.
