= Persepak Payakumbuh =

Indonesian football club in West Sumatra

- Full name: Persatuan Sepakbola Payakumbuh
- Ground: Kubugadang Stadium; Payakumbuh, West Sumatra
- Owner: Askot PSSI Payakumbuh
- Chairman: Endi Noveira
- Manager: Rahmad Afdillah
- Coach: Yudifo Yandri
- League: Liga 4
- 2021: 3rd in Group D, (West Sumatra zone)
Home colours	Away colours

Persatuan Sepakbola Payakumbuh (simply known as Persepak Payakumbuh or Persepak) is an Indonesian football club based in Payakumbuh, West Sumatra. They currently compete in the Liga 4 and their homeground is Kubugadang Stadium.
