= Persiju Sijunjung =

Indonesian football club

- Full name: Persatuan Sepakbola Indonesia Sijunjung
- Ground: M. Yamin Stadium; Sijunjung, West Sumatra
- Capacity: 10,000
- Owner: Sijunjung Government
- Chairman: Yuswir Arifinu
- Manager: Redi Susilo
- Coach: Dian Oktovery
- League: Liga 4
- 2021: Quarter-finals, (West Sumatra zone)
| Home colours | Away colours |

Persiju stands for Persatuan Sepakbola Indonesia Sijunjung (en: Indonesian Football Association of Sijunjung). Persiju Sijunjung is an Indonesian football club based in Sijunjung, West Sumatra. They currently compete in the Liga 4.
