= PS Bungo =

Indonesian football club

- Full name: Persatuan Sepakbola Bungo
- Nickname: Pelanduk Napu
- Founded: 2007; 19 years ago
- Ground: Seruni Baru Stadium; Bungo, Jambi
- Capacity: 5,000
- Owner: Askab PSSI Bungo
- Chairman: Jumiwan Aguza
- Manager: Ghamal Abdul Nasir
- Coach: Tri Qurniawan
- League: Liga 3
- 2023: 4th, Group B
Home colours	Away colours

Persatuan Sepakbola Bungo (simply known as PS Bungo) is an Indonesian football club based in Bungo, Jambi. They currently compete in the Liga 3 Jambi zone.
