= PS Kab. Tapin =

Indonesian football club

- Full name: Persatuan Sepakbola Kabupaten Tapin
- Nicknames: Kuda Hamuk (Mad Horses); Laskar Datu Muning (Datu Muning Warriors)
- Founded: 1986; 40 years ago
- Ground: Balipat Stadium; Tapin, South Kalimantan
- Capacity: 10,000
- Owner: PSSI Tapin Regency
- Chairman: Idis Nurdin Halidi
- Coach: Herman Pulalo
- League: Liga 4
- 2024–25: 1st (South Kalimantan zone); First round, 3rd in Group L (National phase)
Home colours	Away colours

Persatuan Sepakbola Kabupaten Tapin, simply known as PS Kab. Tapin, is an Indonesian football club based in Binuang, Tapin Regency, South Kalimantan. They currently compete in Liga 4.

== Players ==
As of April 2024

Note: Flags indicate national team as defined under FIFA eligibility rules; some limited exceptions apply. Players may hold more than one non-FIFA nationality.

No.	Pos.	Nation	Player
—	GK	IDN	Eko Budi Santoso
—	GK	IDN	Muhammad Kawas Kawasul
—	GK	IDN	Ahmad Muhazir
—	DF	IDN	Bima Prahara
—	DF	IDN	Dimas Ardiansyah Indra
—	DF	IDN	Alfaturrokhman
—	DF	IDN	Ahmad Pitroni
—	DF	IDN	Saipul Rahman
—	DF	IDN	Muhammad Said
—	DF	IDN	Revi Trisna Revalrin
—	DF	IDN	Papin Tuharea
—	MF	IDN	Ahmad Danu
—	MF	IDN	Hanif Anshori

No.	Pos.	Nation	Player
—	MF	IDN	Muhammad Aditia
—	MF	IDN	Wahyu Pradana
—	MF	IDN	Muhammad Jamudi
—	MF	IDN	Muhammad Hidayat
—	FW	IDN	Beny Ashar
—	FW	IDN	Bayu Mahardika
—	FW	IDN	Nova Alfandi
—	FW	IDN	Lukmanul Hakim
—	FW	IDN	Zulkiefli Yahya
—	FW	IDN	Musyadad Faqih
—	FW	IDN	Gusvio Harfiandi
—	FW	IDN	Yanuar Baihaki
—	FW	IDN	Manu Permap

== Honours ==
- Liga 3 South Kalimantan
  - Champion (1): 2023
- Liga 4 South Kalimantan
  - Champion (1): 2024–25
