= PSTS Tanjungbalai =

Indonesian football club

- Full name: Persatuan Sepakbola Tanjungbalai dan Sekitarnya
- Nickname: Laskar Kerang Sakti
- Founded: 1954; 72 years ago
- Ground: Asahan Sakti Stadium, Tanjungbalai
- Manager: (Indonesia) Irma Edy
- Coach: (Indonesia) Saparuddin
- League: Liga 3

Persatuan Sepakbola Tanjungbalai dan Sekitarnya (simply known as PSTS) is an Indonesian football club based in Tanjungbalai, North Sumatra. The club currently plays in Liga 3.
