= PS Bintang Jaya Asahan =

Indonesian football club

- Full name: Persatuan Sepak Bola Bintang Jaya Asahan
- Founded: 2008
- Dissolved: 2017
- Ground: Mutiara Kisaran Stadium, Asahan
- Capacity: 10,000

Persatuan Sepak Bola Bintang Jaya Asahan, commonly known as PS Bintang Jaya Asahan, was an Indonesian football club based in Asahan Regency, North Sumatra. The club was merged with YSK 757 Karimun in 2017 to form 757 Kepri Jaya F.C.

In 2013, the club played in Liga Indonesia Premier Division.
