= Liga Indonesia Third Division =

- Founded: 2005; 21 years ago
- Folded: 2014
- Country: Indonesia
- Confederation: AFC
- Number of clubs: Unlimited
- Level on pyramid: 5
- Promotion to: Second Division
- Domestic cup: Piala Indonesia
- Last champions: Perseba Bangkalan (2013–14)
- Website: Official site of BLAI

Liga Indonesia Third Division (Indonesian: Divisi Tiga Liga Indonesia) was the lowest level (5th tier) of nationwide football competition in Indonesia. Along with first and second division, this league is managed by the Amateur League Board of the Football Association of Indonesia (PSSI).

This was the final league in Indonesia and there was no relegation, that a team can go all the way and become champion. This competition involves players under the age of twenty years, as part of the youth player development program.

After the establishment of the Liga Nusantara in 2014, the Third Division was dissolved.

== Another explanation ==
Liga Indonesia Third Division is the lowest division in the Liga Indonesia. Status of the club and the players who play in this division are amateurs. In the 2008 competition, regulation Third Division players are restricted to the age group 21 years and allowed only three players over the age wear-free. There is no degradation in Third Division competition, but there are some top ranked teams will be promoted to Second Division.

Third Division began to be held in 2005, the first season winner is PSIR Apex. The game begins with a Third Division match the provincial level to compete for quota compete in the National Zone Act. Ration is different in each province depending on the number three team division in the province.

Having escaped from the provincial level, teams that qualify will face teams from other provinces within the same zone (island). Usually divided into zones I & II of Sumatra, Java I & II, Kalimantan, Sulawesi I & II, Nusa Tenggara, and Papua & Maluku. After the round, the teams that qualify will face teams from other zones in the national round.

== Previous winners ==
=== 2005–2008 (fourth-tier) ===
- 2005: PSIR Rembang
- 2006: Perseta Tulungagung
- 2007: Persem Mojokerto

=== 2008–2013 (fifth-tier) ===
- 2008: Persikotas Tasikmalaya
- 2009–10: Persewar Waropen
- 2010–11: MBU Sidoarjo
- 2012: Persiga Trenggalek (LPIS) and Jember United (BLAI)
- 2013–14: Perseba Bangkalan
