= Liga Indonesia Second Division =

- Founded: 1994; 32 years ago
- Folded: 2014
- Country: Indonesia
- Confederation: AFC
- Number of clubs: 78
- Level on pyramid: 4
- Promotion to: First Division
- Relegation to: Third Division
- Domestic cup: Piala Indonesia
- Last champions: Cilegon United (2013)
- Website: Official site of BLAI

Liga Indonesia Second Division (Indonesian: Divisi Dua Liga Indonesia) was the fourth level football league in the Indonesian football competition system. This competition, along with First Division and Third Division, is managed by the Amateur League Board of the Football Association of Indonesia (PSSI).

This level of Indonesian football is amateur and is run on a national level. This competition is for players under the age of twenty-three years and is part of the youth player development program.

After the establishment of the Liga Nusantara in 2014, the Second Division was dissolved.

== Previous winners ==
=== 1994–2008 (third-tier) ===
- 1994–95: Persikabo Bogor
- 1995–96: Persikota Tangerang
- 1996–97: Persipal Palu
- 1998: not held due to cancellation of Divisi Utama
- 1999: PS Palembang
- 2000: Persik Kediri
- 2001: Persela Lamongan
- 2002–03: Persid Jember
- 2003: Persekabpas Pasuruan
- 2004: Persibo Bojonegoro
- 2005: Persiku Kudus
- 2006: PSIR Rembang
- 2007: Persires Rengat

=== 2008–2013 (fourth-tier) ===
- 2008: PS Barito Putera
- 2009–10: Persikasi Bekasi
- 2010–11: Persibangga Purbalingga
- 2012: Nusaina (LPIS), Persinab Nabire (BLAI)
- 2013: Cilegon United
