= 2017 Liga 3 Aceh =

Liga 3 Aceh
- Season: 2017
- Champions: Kuala Nanggroe

The 2017 Liga 3 Aceh is the third edition of Liga 3 Aceh as a qualifying round for the national round of 2017 Liga 3. PSLS Lhokseumawe are the defending champions.

The competition scheduled starts on 22 July 2017.

== Teams ==
There are 25 clubs which will participate the league in this season.

Group A
PS Peureulak Raya (H)
Persidi Idi Rayeuk
PSAU North Aceh
Patriot Aceh
PS Peusangan Raya
PSLS Lhokseumawe
Ref:

Group B
Persip Pasee (H)
Jeumpa
PS Pidie Jaya
Aceh Utara
Persimura Beureunuen
PSSB Bireuen
Bireuen
Juang
PSKBS Kuta Binjei (withdrew)
Ref:

Group C
PSGL Gayo Lues (H)
Aceh United
Persada Southwest Aceh
Persitas Takengon
Persal South Aceh
Pesat Southeast Aceh
PS Simeulue (withdrew)
Persabar West Aceh (withdrew)
Ref:

Group D
Kuala Nanggroe (H)
PSPA Keudah
PSAB Aceh Besar
PSAP Sigli
PS Aceh Jaya
Aceh Timur
Ref:

== Second round ==
12 teams in H Dimurthala Stadium.

Group E

- PSLS Lhokseumawe
- Persimura Beureuenun
- PSAB Aceh Besar

Group F

- Aceh Utara FC
- PS Peureulak Raya
- Persada Southwest Aceh

Group G

- Juang FC Bireuen
- Aceh United FC
- PSAP Sigli

Group H

- Kuala Nanggroe FC
- PSGL Gayo Lues
- Persidi Idi Rayeuk
