= 2025–26 Liga 4 Aceh =

Liga 4 Aceh
- Season: 2025–26
- Dates: 15 November 2025 – 11 April 2026
- Champions: PSAP Sigli
- Runner up: Al-Farlaky
- National phase: PSAP Sigli; Al-Farlaky

The 2025–26 Liga 4 Aceh will be the second season of Liga 4 Aceh after the change in the structure of Indonesian football competition and serves as a qualifying round for the national phase of the 2025–26 Liga 4. The competition is organised by the Aceh Provincial PSSI Association.

== Teams ==
=== Participating teams ===
A total of 17 teams are competing in this season.

No	Team	Location	2024–25 season
1	Persas	Sabang	First round (3rd in Group B)
2	Aceh Kutaraja	Banda Aceh	—
3	Kuala Nanggroe	Banda Aceh	Second round (3rd in Group E)
4	PSAB	Aceh Besar	Runner-up
5	Persimura Beureunuen	Pidie	—
6	PSAP	Pidie	—
7	PSST	Pidie	—
8	Persabar	West Aceh	—
9	Bintang Aceh	Nagan Raya	—
10	Juang	Bireuen	—
11	Persip Pasee	North Aceh	—
12	Al-Farlaky	East Aceh	Second round (4th in Group F)
13	PSGL	Gayo Lues	—
14	PSBL Langsa	Langsa	Fourth place
15	Putra Langsa	Langsa	First round (3rd in Group D)
16	Tamiang United	Aceh Tamiang	—
17	PSAS	Aceh Singkil	—

== Venues ==
There are several match venues in the 2025–26 Liga 4 Aceh competition.

- Seribu Bukit Stadium, Gayo Lues (Group A)
- Cot Darat Stadium, West Aceh (Group B)
- Blang Paseh Stadium, Pidie (Group C; Round of 8, Groups E and F; knockout stage)
- Carlos Stadium, Aceh Besar (Group D)

== First round ==
The draw for the first round took place on 12 December 2025 at the PSSI Secretariat of the Aceh Provincial Association, Banda Aceh. The 17 teams will be drawn into 4 groups of four or five based on the geographical location of their homebase. The first round will be played in a home tournament format of single round-robin matches.

The top two teams of each group will qualify for the second round.

=== Group A ===
All matches will be held at Seribu Bukit Stadium, Gayo Lues.

Pos	Team	Pld	W	D	L	GF	GA	GD	Pts	Qualification
1	Al-Farlaky	3	3	0	0	5	0	+5	9	Qualification to the second round
2	PSGL (H)	3	2	0	1	5	2	+3	6	Qualification to the second round
3	Persip Pasee	3	1	0	2	2	4	−2	3	
4	Juang	3	0	0	3	0	6	−6	0	

Source: Liga 4 Aceh
Rules for classification: 1) Points; 2) Head-to-head points; 3) Head-to-head goal difference; 4) Head-to-head goals scored; 5) Goal difference; 6) Goals scored; 7) Fair-play points; 8) Draw.
(H) Hosts

=== Group B ===
All matches will be held at Cot Darat Stadium, West Aceh.

Pos	Team	Pld	W	D	L	GF	GA	GD	Pts	Qualification
1	Persas	3	2	1	0	8	3	+5	7	Qualification to the second round
2	Persabar (H)	3	1	2	0	4	3	+1	5	Qualification to the second round
3	PSAS	3	1	0	2	5	7	−2	3	
4	Bintang Aceh	3	0	1	2	5	9	−4	1	

Source: Liga 4 Aceh
Rules for classification: 1) Points; 2) Head-to-head points; 3) Head-to-head goal difference; 4) Head-to-head goals scored; 5) Goal difference; 6) Goals scored; 7) Fair-play points; 8) Draw.
(H) Hosts

=== Group C ===
All matches will be held at Blang Paseh Stadium, Pidie.

Pos	Team	Pld	W	D	L	GF	GA	GD	Pts	Qualification
1	PSAP (H)	3	3	0	0	8	0	+8	9	Qualification to the second round
2	PSST	3	2	0	1	3	5	−2	6	Qualification to the second round
3	Persimura Beureunuen	3	0	1	2	2	4	−2	1	
4	Tamiang United	3	0	1	2	3	7	−4	1	
5	Putra Langsa	0	0	0	0	0	0	0	0	Withdraw

Source: Liga 4 Aceh
Rules for classification: 1) Points; 2) Head-to-head points; 3) Head-to-head goal difference; 4) Head-to-head goals scored; 5) Goal difference; 6) Goals scored; 7) Fair-play points; 8) Draw.
(H) Hosts

=== Group D ===
All matches will be held at Blang Paseh Stadium, Pidie.

Pos	Team	Pld	W	D	L	GF	GA	GD	Pts	Qualification
1	PSAB	3	3	0	0	4	0	+4	9	Qualification to the second round
2	Kuala Nanggroe (H)	3	1	1	1	4	3	+1	4	Qualification to the second round
3	PSBL Langsa	3	0	2	1	3	4	−1	2	
4	Aceh Kutaraja	3	0	1	2	3	7	−4	1	

Source: Liga 4 Aceh
Rules for classification: 1) Points; 2) Head-to-head points; 3) Head-to-head goal difference; 4) Head-to-head goals scored; 5) Goal difference; 6) Goals scored; 7) Fair-play points; 8) Draw.
(H) Hosts

== Second round ==
A total of 8 teams will be drawn into two groups of four. The group stage will be played in a home tournament format of single round-robin matches.

The top two teams of each group will qualify for the knockout round.

=== Group E ===
All matches will be held at Blang Paseh Stadium, Pidie.

Pos	Team	Pld	W	D	L	GF	GA	GD	Pts	Qualification
1	Al-Farlaky	3	3	0	0	12	3	+9	9	Qualification to the knockout round
2	Kuala Nanggroe	3	1	1	1	6	5	+1	4	Qualification to the knockout round
3	Persas	3	1	1	1	5	6	−1	4	
4	PSST	3	0	0	3	1	10	−9	0	

Source: Liga 4 Aceh
Rules for classification: 1) Points; 2) Head-to-head points; 3) Head-to-head goal difference; 4) Head-to-head goals scored; 5) Goal difference; 6) Goals scored; 7) Fair-play points; 8) Draw.

=== Group F ===
All matches will be held at Blang Paseh Stadium, Pidie.

Pos	Team	Pld	W	D	L	GF	GA	GD	Pts	Qualification
1	PSAP (H)	3	3	0	0	8	0	+8	9	Qualification to the knockout round
2	PSGL	3	2	0	1	11	3	+8	6	Qualification to the knockout round
3	PSAB	3	1	0	2	4	5	−1	3	
4	Persabar	3	0	0	3	1	16	−15	0	

Source: Liga 4 Aceh
Rules for classification: 1) Points; 2) Head-to-head points; 3) Head-to-head goal difference; 4) Head-to-head goals scored; 5) Goal difference; 6) Goals scored; 7) Fair-play points; 8) Draw.
(H) Hosts

== Knockout round ==
The knockout round will be played as a single match. If tied after regulation time, extra time and, if necessary, a penalty shoot-out will be used to decide the winning team.

=== Bracket ===
Semi-finals
7 April 2026
Al-Farlaky	3
PSGL	1
8 April 2026
PSAP	5
Kuala Nanggroe	0

Final
11 April 2026
Al-Farlaky	0
PSAP	2
Third-place play-off
10 April 2026
PSGL	3
Kuala Nanggroe	0

=== Semi-finals ===
7 April 2026
20:30 (UTC+7)

Al-Farlaky	3–1	PSGL
	Report

Blang Paseh Stadium, Pidie
8 April 2026
20:30 (UTC+7)

PSAP	5–0	Kuala Nanggroe
	Report

Blang Paseh Stadium, Pidie

=== Third-place play-off ===
10 April 2026
20:30 (UTC+7)

PSGL	3–0	Kuala Nanggroe
	Report

Blang Paseh Stadium, Pidie

=== Final ===
11 April 2026
20:30 (UTC+7)

Al-Farlaky	0–2	PSAP
	Report	30' N. Alaba; 60' A. Fikri

Blang Paseh Stadium, Pidie

== See also ==
- 2025–26 Liga 4
