= 2011–12 Liga Indonesia First Division =

Liga Indonesian First Division
- Season: 2011–12
- Champions: Persekap Pasuruan
- Promoted: Persenga Nganjuk; Persibangga Purbalingga; PSBL Bandar Lampung; PSSA Asahan; Persewon Wondama; Persikubar West Kutai; Medina Medan Jaya; Persekap Pasuruan; PS Siak; Persika Karawang; Persifa Fakfak; Persipon Pontianak
- Matches: 232
- Goals: 562 (2.42 per match)
- Top goalscorer: Bambang Hardianto (7 goals)
- Biggest home win: PS Siak 10–1 PS Pasbar (18 January 2012)
- Biggest away win: Persebi 1–4 Persekap (27 January 2012)
- Highest scoring: PS Siak 10–1 PS Pasbar (18 January 2012)
- Longest winning run: (4 matches); PSSA (from 17 February 2012); PS Siak; Persid
- Longest unbeaten run: (7 matches); Persika (ended on 26 February 2012); PS Siak

The 2011–12 Liga Indonesia First Division season was the seventeenth season of the Liga Indonesia First Division. The competition was organized by the PSSI. Starting this season, the competition was intended to be for footballers under twenty-three years of age.

The competition began on 16 December 2011 and finished on 30 October 2012.

== First stage ==
Total 66 clubs will participate in this season, divided into 12 groups. First stage start on December 16, 2011 and finished on March 13, 2012.

Key to colours in group tables
Top two placed teams advance to the 2nd Round
Bottom placed teams Relegated to the Second Division

=== Group I ===
All matches were played in H. Dimurtala Stadium, Banda Aceh with single match home tournament system.

Pos	Team	Pld	W	D	L	GF	GA	GD	Pts	PSAL	IDIE	PSPJ	NAFC	PSAS	PSAB
1	Persal South Aceh	5	4	1	0	11	3	+8	13			1–0	2–1	5–0	
2	Persidi Idi Rayeuk	5	4	0	1	8	4	+4	12	1–2			1–0		1–0
3	PS Pidie Jaya	5	3	0	2	9	3	+6	9		1–2		2–0	4–0	2–0
4	North Aceh	5	2	0	3	9	7	+2	6						3–0
5	Persas Sabang	5	1	0	4	6	17	−11	3		1–3		2–5		3–0
6	PSAB Aceh Besar	5	0	1	4	1	10	−9	−5 (Note: The value of PSAB Aceh Besar minus six points because they were not present at the match against North Aceh on February 10 and against the Persas Sabang on February 11, 2012 both held in H. Dimurthala Stadium, Banda Aceh.)	1–1					

Updated to match(es) played on 3 April 2012. Source: Divisi Satu Table and Review
Rules for classification: 1st points; 2nd goal difference; 3rd number of goals scored.

=== Group II ===
All round I matches were played in Baharuddin Siregar Stadium, Lubukpakam and round II were played in Mutiara Kisaran Stadium, Asahan Regency.

Pos	Team	Pld	W	D	L	GF	GA	GD	Pts	PSSA	MMJ	PSDS	LAB	MDU	PSPP
1	PSSA Asahan	9	6	2	1	19	6	+13	20		3–1	3–1	3–0	2–0	
2	Medina Medan Jaya	9	4	3	2	13	9	+4	15	4–1		0–0	1–1	1–0	1–2
3	PSDS Deli Serdang	9	4	2	3	11	8	+3	14	0–0	0–1		1–0	3–1	3–1
4	Poslab Labuhan Batu	9	4	2	3	10	11	−1	14	0–3	1–1	2–1		1–0	
5	Medan United	9	1	1	7	4	13	−9	4	0–0	1–3	0–2	0–1		
6	PSPP Padang Panjang (Note: PSPP Padang Panjang withdrew from the competition in Round II after completing five games in round I and finished ranked sixth in the standings Group II.)	5	1	0	4	4	14	−10	3	0–4			1–4	0–2	

Updated to match(es) played on 3 April 2012. Source: Divisi Satu Table and Review
Rules for classification: 1st points; 2nd goal difference; 3rd number of goals scored.

=== Group III ===
All matches were played with home and away system.

Pos	Team	Pld	W	D	L	GF	GA	GD	Pts	SIAK	KTSI	PSBB	PSPB	SIJU	BGO
1	PS Siak	10	7	2	1	28	9	+19	23		1–0	2–0	10–1	3–1	5–1
2	Persiks Kuantan Singingi	10	5	4	1	14	8	+6	19	3–1		1–0	1–0	1–0	1–1
3	Persibabar West Bangka	10	3	4	3	16	11	+5	13	2–2	1–1		5–0	3–0	1–0
4	PS Pasbar	10	3	2	5	11	27	−16	11	1–1	2–2	2–1		2–1	2–1
5	Persiju Sijunjung	10	2	2	6	10	15	−5	8	0–2	1–1	2–2	3–0		2–0
6	PS Bungo	10	2	2	6	8	17	−9	8	0–1	1–3	1–1	2–1	1–0	

Updated to match(es) played on 3 April 2012. Source: Divisi Satu Table and Review
Rules for classification: 1st points; 2nd goal difference; 3rd number of goals scored.

=== Group IV ===
All matches were played with home and away system.

Pos	Team	Pld	W	D	L	GF	GA	GD	Pts	KASI	PSBL	BKA	PSR	KAD	JTFC
1	Persikasi Bekasi	8	4	0	4	11	10	+1	12		4–1	2–1	2–0	2–1	
2	PSBL Bandar Lampung	8	4	0	4	6	11	−5	12	2–1		1–0	0–2	1–0	
3	PS Bangka	8	3	2	3	8	6	+2	11	3–0	0–1		1–0	2–1	
4	Perserang Serang	8	3	2	3	8	7	+1	11	1–0	2–0	1–1		0–1	
5	Persikad Depok	8	3	2	3	8	7	+1	11	1–0	2–0	0–0	2–2		
6	Jakarta Timur (W)	0	0	0	0	0	0	0	0						

Updated to match(es) played on 3 April 2012. Source: Divisi Satu Table and Review
Rules for classification: 1st points; 2nd goal difference; 3rd number of goals scored.
(W) Withdrew

=== Group V ===
All matches were played with home and away system.

Pos	Team	Pld	W	D	L	GF	GA	GD	Pts	KRW	BANG	BAS	PSKG	PSGC	PSB
1	Persika Karawang	10	7	2	1	19	8	+11	23		1–0	2–1	4–0	3–1	3–1
2	Persap Purbalingga	10	6	1	3	10	5	+5	19	2–0		1–0	2–0	2–1	1–0
3	Persibas Banyumas	10	4	2	4	13	14	−1	14	1–1	1–1		4–2	2–0	2–1
4	Pesik Kuningan	10	4	2	4	11	14	−3	14	1–2	1–0	3–0		1–0	1–0
5	PSGC Galuh Ciamis	10	3	2	5	12	13	−1	11	1–1	1–0	2–0	1–1		4–1
6	PSB Bogor	10	1	1	8	7	18	−11	4	0–2	0–1	1–2	1–1	2–1	

Updated to match(es) played on 3 April 2012. Source: Divisi Satu Table and Review
Rules for classification: 1st points; 2nd goal difference; 3rd number of goals scored.

=== Group VI ===
All matches were played with home and away system.

Pos	Team	Pld	W	D	L	GF	GA	GD	Pts	PUR	KDL	SEBI	BLO	SRA	PATI
1	Persipur Purwodadi	10	5	3	2	18	9	+9	18		3–0	4–1	2–1	1–1	4–0
2	Persik Kendal	10	4	5	1	11	7	+4	17	1–0		0–0	0–0	4–0	1–0
3	Persebi Boyolali	10	3	4	3	9	11	−2	13	2–0	1–1		1–0	1–0	2–2
4	Persekaba Blora	10	3	3	4	7	8	−1	12	1–1	1–1	1–0		2–1	1–0
5	PSISra Sragen	10	3	2	5	11	14	−3	11	2–2	1–2	2–0	1–0		2–0
6	Persipa Pati	10	2	3	5	7	14	−7	9	0–1	1–1	1–1	1–0	2–1	

Updated to match(es) played on 3 April 2012. Source: Divisi Satu Table and Review
Rules for classification: 1st points; 2nd goal difference; 3rd number of goals scored.

=== Group VII ===
All matches were played with home and away system.

Pos	Team	Pld	W	D	L	GF	GA	GD	Pts	NGA	DIK	PSDA	KPAS	SETA	KOBA
1	Persenga Nganjuk	10	6	1	3	11	5	+6	19		1–0	1–1	2–0	2–0	2–0
2	Persedikab Kediri	10	4	4	2	13	9	+4	16	2–0		2–1	1–1	1–0	2–0
3	Persida Sidoarjo	10	3	4	3	11	8	+3	13	0–1	2–1		2–0	3–0	0–0
4	Persekabpas Pasuruan	10	3	3	4	8	12	−4	12	0–2	2–2	2–1		2–0	1–0
5	Perseta Tulungagung	10	3	3	4	6	10	−4	12	1–0	1–1	0–0	2–0		2–1
6	Persikoba Batu	10	1	5	4	4	9	−5	8	1–0	1–1	1–1	0–0	0–0	

Updated to match(es) played on 3 April 2012. Source: Divisi Satu Table and Review
Rules for classification: 1st points; 2nd goal difference; 3rd number of goals scored.

=== Group VIII ===
All matches were played in Untung Suropati Stadium, Pasuruan and Pragas Stadium, Sumbawa

Pos	Team	Pld	W	D	L	GF	GA	GD	Pts	KAP	SUM	BIMA	PSID	BKL
1	Persekap Pasuruan	6	5	0	1	16	4	+12	15		2–1	3–0	1–0	
2	Persisum Sumbawa	6	3	0	3	17	5	+12	9	1–0		2–0	2–0	
3	Persebi Bima	6	2	1	3	9	11	−2	7	1–4	1–0		1–1	
4	PSID Jombang	6	1	1	4	5	17	−12	4	1–6	2–1	1–6		
5	Perseba Super (W)	0	0	0	0	0	0	0	0					

Updated to match(es) played on 3 April 2012. Source: Divisi Satu Table and Review
Rules for classification: 1st points; 2nd goal difference; 3rd number of goals scored.
(W) Withdrew

=== Group IX ===
All round I matches were played in Sangata Main Stadium, East Kutai Regency and round II were played in Kebon Sajoek Stadium, Pontianak.

Pos	Team	Pld	W	D	L	GF	GA	GD	Pts	PON	KUBR	KUTM	STA	TAP
1	Persipon Pontianak	6	3	1	2	10	6	+4	10		1–1	1–0	3–0	
2	Persikubar West Kutai	6	3	1	2	12	9	+3	10	3–0		2–3	2–3	
3	Persikutim East Kutai	6	3	1	2	8	7	+1	10	2–1	0–1		2–1	
4	Persista Sintang	6	1	1	4	7	15	−8	4	0–4	2–3	1–1		
5	PS Tapin (W)	0	0	0	0	0	0	0	0					

Updated to match(es) played on 3 April 2012. Source: Divisi Satu Table and Review
Rules for classification: 1st points; 2nd goal difference; 3rd number of goals scored.
(W) Withdrew

=== Group X ===
All matches were played with home and away system.

Pos	Team	Pld	W	D	L	GF	GA	GD	Pts	PALU	PPU	PAS	PSKT
1	Persipal Palu	4	3	0	1	9	3	+6	9			3–0	5–1
2	PS PPU	3	3	0	0	6	2	+4	9			2–1	
3	Persipas Paser	5	2	0	3	6	10	−4	3 (Note: The value of Persipas Paser minus three points because they were not present at the match against Persipal Palu in Gawalise Stadium on February 15, 2012.)	2–1	1–3		
4	PSKT Tomohon	4	0	0	4	2	9	−7	0	0–1	0–1	1–2	

Updated to match(es) played on 3 April 2012. Source: Divisi Satu Table and Review
Rules for classification: 1st points; 2nd goal difference; 3rd number of goals scored.

=== Group XI ===
All round I matches were played in Sanggeng Stadium, Manokwari and round II wereplayed in November 16 Stadium, Fak-Fak Regency. All matches were played with home and away system.

Pos	Team	Pld	W	D	L	GF	GA	GD	Pts	WON	FAK	KOS	SOR	KAI
1	Persewon Wondama	6	4	0	2	7	3	+4	12		2–1	1–0	3–0	
2	Persifa Fakfak	6	3	2	1	10	6	+4	11	1–0		2–0	4–2	
3	Persikos Sorong	6	3	1	2	9	7	+2	10	1–0	1–1		4–2	
4	Persiss Sorong	6	0	1	5	6	16	−10	1	0–1	1–1	1–3		
5	Persika Kaimana (W)	0	0	0	0	0	0	0	0					

Updated to match(es) played on 3 April 2012. Source: Divisi Satu Table and Review
Rules for classification: 1st points; 2nd goal difference; 3rd number of goals scored.
(W) Withdrew

=== Group XII ===
All matches were played in Mandala Stadium and Barnabas Youwe Stadium, Jayapura

Pos	Team	Pld	W	D	L	GF	GA	GD	Pts	WAR	YKFC	PSGB	PSAS	PANI
1	Persewar Waropen	3	3	0	0	6	0	+6	9			1–0	3–0	
2	Yahukimo	2	1	1	0	1	0	+1	4			1–0		
3	Persigubin Pegunungan Bintang	4	1	1	2	3	4	−1	4					
4	Persias Asmat	3	0	2	1	2	5	−3	2		0–0	2–2		
5	Persipani Paniai	2	0	0	2	0	3	−3	0	0–2		0–1		

Updated to match(es) played on 3 April 2012. Source: Divisi Satu Table and Review
Rules for classification: 1st points; 2nd goal difference; 3rd number of goals scored.

== Second stage ==
Total 24 clubs will participate in this stage, divided into 6 groups.

== Third stage ==
Total 12 clubs will participate in this stage, divided into 3 groups. Three group winner and best runner-up advances to the Semifinal. This stage started on 20 June and finished on 27 June 2012.

Key to colours in group tables
Top two placed teams advance to the Semifinal

=== Group H ===
All match played in Purnawarman Stadium, Purwakarta

Pos	Team	Pld	W	D	L	GF	GA	GD	Pts
1	Persebangga Purbalingga	3	3	0	0	6	0	+6	9
2	PSBL Bandar Lampung	3	2	0	1	4	2	+2	6
3	Persenga Nganjuk	3	1	0	2	1	2	−1	3
4	PSSA Asahan	3	0	0	3	0	7	−7	0

Updated to match(es) played on unknown. Source:

=== Group I ===
All match played in Tambun Stadium, Bekasi

Pos	Team	Pld	W	D	L	GF	GA	GD	Pts
1	PS Siak	3	3	0	0	6	0	+6	9
2	Persewon Wondama	3	1	1	1	4	2	+2	4
3	Persikubar West Kutai	3	1	1	1	4	3	+1	4
4	Medina Medan Jaya	3	0	0	3	0	9	−9	0

Updated to match(es) played on unknown. Source:

=== Group J ===
All match played in Tambun Stadium, Bekasi

Pos	Team	Pld	W	D	L	GF	GA	GD	Pts
1	Persipon Pontianak	3	2	1	0	5	1	+4	7
2	Persekap Pasuruan	3	2	1	0	3	1	+2	7
3	Persifa Fakfak	3	0	1	2	1	3	−2	1
4	Persika Karawang	3	0	1	2	0	4	−4	1

Updated to match(es) played on unknown. Source:

== Final stage ==
The final stage of 2012 Liga Indonesia First Division (PSSI) was scheduled to be played on 29–30 October 2012. Four clubs qualify for this stage are Persebangga Purbalingga (Group H), PS Siak (Group I), Persipon Pontianak (Group J) and Persekap Pasuruan City (Best runner-up, Group J).

All matches will be played in Tambun Mini Stadium, Bekasi

- Semi-finals, Monday (29/10).
- Persibangga Purbalingga v. PS Siak (4–1), 13.00 WIB
- Persekap Pasuruan v. Persipon Pontianak (2–0), 15.30 WIB

Final, Tuesday (30/10).

- Persibangga Purbalingga
- Persekap Pasuruan v. Persibangga Purbalingga (2–1), 15.00 WIB
- Goals:
  - Muhammad Nurhadi (24'), Bagus Cahyono (77'); Inggrit Prayitno (11').

== Season statistics ==
=== Top scorers ===
	Player	Club	Goals
1	(Indonesia) Bambang Hardianto	PSSA Asahan	7
2	(Indonesia) Maulana	PS Siak	6
3	(Indonesia) M. Iksan Lubis	Medina Medan Jaya	5
3	(Indonesia) Andre Kurniawan	Persal South Aceh	5
3	(Indonesia) Yulianto	Persibabar West Bangka	5
3	(Indonesia) Khairul Yadi	PS Pidie Jaya	5
3	(Indonesia) Safri Koto	PSSA Asahan	5
8	(Indonesia) Gunaryo	Persebangga Purbalingga	4
8	(Indonesia) Dimas Bagus Temono	Persipur Purwodadi	4
8	(Indonesia) Agung Surya Wardana	PSDS Deli Serdang	4
