= 2010 Liga Indonesia First Division =

Liga Indonesia First Division
- Season: 2010
- Champions: PSBS Biak
- Promoted: Persbul Buol; Perssin Sinjai; PSBS Biak; PSBL Langsa; Persepam Pamekasan; Madiun Putra
- Relegated: PSAB Aceh Besar; Persibabar West Bangka; Persebsi Sibolga; Persika Karawang; Persikad Depok; Persibat Batang; Persekaba Blora; Persiko Kotabaru; Persista Sintang; Persikos Sorong; Persikota Tidore; Persitoli Tolikara
- Matches: 153
- Goals: 330 (2.16 per match)
- Biggest home win: Perssin Sinjai 5–0 Persebi Bima (1 November 2010)
- Highest scoring: Persbul Buol 5–3 PSBL Langsa (10 December 2010)
- Longest winning run: PSBS Biak (7 games)
- Longest unbeaten run: Persepam Pamekasan and PSBS Biak (10 games)

The 2010 Liga Indonesia First Division is the 16th edition of Liga Indonesia First Division which is scheduled to start in September 2010 and finish in the same year.

Participating clubs will be divided 12 groups based on their regions in Java, Kalimantan, Sulawesi, Sumatera, and Papua.

== First stage ==
Total 57 clubs will participate in this season, divided into 12 groups.

Key to colours in group tables
Top two placed teams advance to the 2nd Round
Bottom placed teams relegated to the Second Division

Group winner and runner-up qualify for 2nd round.

Group I: UNRI Stadium, Riau

Pos	Team	Pld	W	D	L	GF	GA	GD	Pts
1	Persas Sabang	4	2	2	0	7	3	+4	8
2	Medina Medan Jaya	4	2	1	1	5	5	0	7
3	Aceh Utara	4	1	3	0	7	6	+1	6
4	Persidi Idi Rayeuk	4	0	3	1	2	3	−1	3
5	PSAB Aceh Besar	4	0	1	3	2	6	−4	1

Group II: Kampung Rempak Stadium, Siak

Pos	Team	Pld	W	D	L	GF	GA	GD	Pts
1	PS Siak	5	3	2	0	4	0	+4	11
2	PSP Padang	5	3	1	1	6	3	+3	10
3	PSPP Padang Panjang	5	2	2	1	5	5	0	8
4	PS Bangka	6	2	2	2	2	3	−1	8
5	Persibabar West Bangka	5	1	1	3	5	6	−1	4
6	Persires Rengat (J)	0	0	0	0	0	0	0	0

(J) Join Premier Division

Group III: Seribu Bukit Stadium, Blangkejeren, Gayo Lues Regency

Pos	Team	Pld	W	D	L	GF	GA	GD	Pts
1	PSGL Gayo Lues	3	2	1	0	5	2	+3	7
2	PSBL Langsa	3	2	0	1	3	1	+2	6
3	PSSA Asahan	3	0	2	1	4	5	−1	2
4	Persiju Sijunjung	3	0	1	2	1	6	−5	1
5	Persebsi Sibolga (W)	0	0	0	0	0	0	0	0

(W) Withdrew

Group IV: Kraton Stadium, Pekalongan

Pos	Team	Pld	W	D	L	GF	GA	GD	Pts
1	Persip Pekalongan	5	4	1	0	7	2	+5	13
2	Persitema Temanggung	5	3	1	1	7	3	+4	10
3	Persikasi Bekasi	5	2	2	1	7	5	+2	8
4	Persipa Pati	5	2	1	2	7	8	−1	7
5	PSBL Bandar Lampung	5	1	0	4	2	5	−3	3
6	Persika Karawang	5	0	1	4	3	8	−5	1

Group V: Supriyadi Stadium, Blitar

Pos	Team	Pld	W	D	L	GF	GA	GD	Pts
1	PSBK Blitar	4	4	0	0	10	2	+8	12
2	Pesik Kuningan	5	2	1	2	6	3	+3	7
3	PSB Bogor	5	1	2	2	7	5	+2	5
4	Jakarta Timur	5	1	0	4	1	9	−8	3
5	Persikad Depok	5	0	1	4	4	9	−5	1

Group VI: Notohadinegoro Stadium, Jember

Pos	Team	Pld	W	D	L	GF	GA	GD	Pts
1	Persid Jember	3	3	0	0	7	0	+7	9
2	Persebi Boyolali	3	1	0	2	3	5	−2	3
3	Persik Kendal	3	1	0	2	1	4	−3	3
4	Persida Sidoarjo	3	1	0	2	3	7	−4	3
5	Persibat Batang (W)	0	0	0	0	0	0	0	0

(W) Withdrew

Group VII: Wilis Stadium, Madiun

Pos	Team	Pld	W	D	L	GF	GA	GD	Pts
1	Madiun Putra	4	3	1	0	6	1	+5	10
2	Persepam Pamekasan	4	2	2	0	3	1	+2	8
3	Persipon Pontianak	4	1	2	1	2	1	+1	5
4	Persipur Purwodadi	4	1	0	3	1	6	−5	3
5	Persekaba Blora	4	0	1	3	0	3	−3	1

Group VIII: Field 17 Sports Venues, Mataram

Pos	Team	Pld	W	D	L	GF	GA	GD	Pts
1	KSB Sumbawa Barat	3	2	1	0	4	1	+3	7
2	Persebi Bima	3	1	2	0	2	1	+1	5
3	Persekabpas Pasuruan	3	0	2	1	0	2	−2	2
4	Persipas Paser	3	0	1	2	2	4	−2	1
5	Persiko Kotabaru (W)	0	0	0	0	0	0	0	0

(W) Withdrew

Group IX: Diponegoro Stadium, Banyuwangi

Pos	Team	Pld	W	D	L	GF	GA	GD	Pts
1	Persewangi Banyuwangi	3	2	1	0	3	0	+3	7
2	Persewon Wondama	3	1	2	0	1	0	+1	5
3	Persedikab Kabupaten Kediri	3	1	1	1	5	2	+3	4
4	Persista Sintang	3	0	0	3	1	8	−7	0
5	Persis Solo (W)	0	0	0	0	0	0	0	0

(W) Withdrew

Group X: Kuonoto Stadium, Buol

Pos	Team	Pld	W	D	L	GF	GA	GD	Pts
1	Persipal Palu	3	2	1	0	4	2	+2	7
2	Persbul Buol	3	2	0	1	3	2	+1	6
3	PSKT Tomohon	3	1	0	2	3	4	−1	3
4	Persikos Sorong	1	0	1	0	1	3	−2	1

Group XI: Andi Bintang Stadium, Sinjai

Pos	Team	Pld	W	D	L	GF	GA	GD	Pts
1	Perssin Sinjai	2	2	0	0	3	0	+3	6
2	Yahukimo	2	1	0	1	2	2	0	3
3	Persikota Tidore	2	0	0	2	1	4	−3	0

Group XII: Cenderawasih Stadium, Biak Numfor Regency

Pos	Team	Pld	W	D	L	GF	GA	GD	Pts
1	PSBS Biak	2	2	0	0	4	1	+3	6
2	Persigubin Bintang Mountains	2	1	0	1	4	2	+2	3
3	Persias Asmat	2	0	0	2	0	5	−5	0
4	Persitoli Tolikara (W)	0	0	0	0	0	0	0	0

(W) Withdrew

== Second stage ==
This stage, which will start on October 28, 2010, involves 12 group winners and 12 runners up qualified from the first stage. Therefore, in total 24 clubs, which are divided into 6 groups will participate in this stage.

Qualified clubs for the 2nd round: Persas Sabang, Madina Medan Jaya, PS Siak, PSP Padang, PSBL Langsa, PSGL Gayo Lues, Persip Pekalongan, Persitema Temanggung, PSBK Blitar, Pesik Kuningan, Persid Jember, Persik Kendal, Madiun Putra, Persepam Pamekasan, KSB West Sumbawa, Persebi Bima, Persewangi Banyuwangi, Persewon Wondama, Persbul Buol, Persipal Palu, Perssin Sinjai, Persepar Palangkaraya, PSBS Biak, and Persigubin Bintang Mountains.

Key to colours in group tables
Top two placed teams advance to the third stage

Group A (in Gayo Lues Regency, Nanggroe Aceh Darussalam)

Pos	Team	Pld	W	D	L	GF	GA	GD	Pts
1	PSGL Gayo Lues	3	3	0	0	6	0	+6	9
2	PSBL Langsa	3	2	1	0	5	0	+5	7
3	PS Siak	3	0	1	2	0	5	−5	−2 (Note: Obtained a reduction of three points because both teams are not present in the final group match)
4	PSP Padang	3	0	0	3	0	6	−6	−3

Notes:

Group B (in Temanggung Regency, Central Java)

Pos	Team	Pld	W	D	L	GF	GA	GD	Pts
1	Persitema Temanggung	3	2	1	0	5	2	+3	7
2	Persip Pekalongan	3	2	0	1	7	1	+6	6
3	Persas Sabang	3	1	0	2	3	5	−2	3
4	Medina Medan Jaya	3	0	1	2	2	9	−7	1

Group C (in Madiun, East Java)

Pos	Team	Pld	W	D	L	GF	GA	GD	Pts
1	Madiun Putra	3	3	0	0	6	2	+4	9
2	PSBK Blitar	3	2	0	1	3	1	+2	6
3	Persik Kendal	3	1	0	2	2	4	−2	3
4	Pesik Kuningan	3	0	0	3	3	4	−1	0

Group D (in Banyuwangi, East Java)

Pos	Team	Pld	W	D	L	GF	GA	GD	Pts
1	Persewangi Banyuwangi	3	2	1	0	7	0	+7	7
2	Persepam Pamekasan	3	1	2	0	1	0	+1	5
3	Persid Jember	3	0	2	1	1	5	−4	2
4	Persewon Wondama	3	0	1	2	1	5	−4	1

Group E (in Sinjai, Sinjai Regency, South Sulawesi)

Pos	Team	Pld	W	D	L	GF	GA	GD	Pts
1	Perssin Sinjai	3	3	0	0	8	0	+8	9
2	KSB Sumbawa Barat	3	2	0	1	8	3	+5	6
3	Persepar Palangkaraya	3	1	0	2	4	5	−1	3
4	Persebi Bima	3	0	0	3	1	13	−12	0

Group F (in Biak Numfor Regency, Papua)

Pos	Team	Pld	W	D	L	GF	GA	GD	Pts
1	PSBS Biak	3	3	0	0	8	0	+8	9
2	Persbul Buol	3	1	1	1	1	3	−2	4
3	Persipal Palu	3	1	0	2	2	3	−1	3
4	Persigubin Bintang Mountains	3	0	1	2	1	5	−4	1

== Third stage ==
Participants are the 6 group winners and 6 runners-up from second stage. Total 12 clubs will participate in this stage, divided into 3 groups. This stage will start on December 2 to December 8, 2010.

Qualified clubs for the 3rd round : PSGL Gayo Lues, PSBL Langsa, PSBS Biak, Persbul Buol, Persitema Temanggung, Persip Pekalongan, Madiun Putra, PSBK Blitar, Persewangi Banyuwangi, Persepam Pamekasan, Perssin Sinjai, and KSB West Sumbawa.

Key to colours in group tables
Top two placed teams promotion to Premier Division
Best Second placed teams advance to the Fourth stage

Group I : Singaperbangsa Stadium, Karawang

Pos	Team	Pld	W	D	L	GF	GA	GD	Pts
1	Persbul Buol	3	2	1	0	5	3	+2	7
2	Perssin Sinjai	3	1	2	0	3	2	+1	5
3	Persewangi Banyuwangi	3	1	1	1	4	3	+1	4
4	Persitema Temanggung	3	0	0	3	1	5	−4	0

Group II : Singaperbangsa Stadium, Karawang

Pos	Team	Pld	W	D	L	GF	GA	GD	Pts
1	PSBS Biak	3	2	1	0	5	2	+3	7
2	PSBL Langsa	3	2	0	1	5	4	+1	6
3	PSBK Blitar	3	0	2	1	3	4	−1	2
4	KSB West Sumbawa	3	0	1	2	1	5	−4	1

Group III : Lebak Bulus Stadium, Jakarta

Pos	Team	Pld	W	D	L	GF	GA	GD	Pts
1	Persepam Pamekasan	3	1	2	0	4	3	+1	5
2	Madiun Putra	3	1	1	1	4	3	+1	4
3	Persip Pekalongan	3	0	3	0	4	4	0	3
4	PSGL Gayo Lues	3	0	2	1	3	5	−2	2

Best Runner-up
Grp	Team	Pld	W	D	L	GF	GA	GD	Pts
II	PSBL Langsa	3	2	0	1	5	4	+1	6
I	Perssin Sinjai	3	1	2	0	3	2	+1	5
III	Madiun Putra	3	1	1	1	4	3	+1	4

== Fourth stage ==
Participate is 3 grub winner and 1 best runner-up from third stage. Total 4 clubs will participate in this stage.

=== Qualify teams ===
- Persbul Buol
- PSBS Biak
- PSBL Langsa
- Persepam Pamekasan

=== Knockout stage ===
Semi-finals
10 December 2010 – Singaperbangsa
Persbul	5
PSBL	3
10 December 2010 – Singaperbangsa
Persepam	2
PSBS	3

Final
12 December 2010 – Singaperbangsa
Persbul	0
PSBS	1

Semi-finals

This stage schedule held on 10 December 2010.

10 December 2010
15:30 WIB

Persbul	5–3	PSBL

Singaperbangsa Stadium, Karawang
10 December 2010
19:00 WIB

Persepam	2–3	PSBS
Rano 14'; Nur Rochman 71'		18' Orthis; 23' Alex; 90' Ronald

Singaperbangsa Stadium, Karawang

Final stage

Participate is 2 Semifinal winner. Schedule held on 12 December 2010

12 December 2010
15:30 WIB

Persbul	0–1	PSBS
Ryan S. (yellow card) 43'; M. Resa (yellow card) 63'	Report	56' Orthis; (yellow card) 72' Mario

Singaperbangsa Stadium, Karawang, Indonesia
Attendance: 500
Referee: Syarifudin Sinaga

Champions
PSBS Biak
Prize money: USD 5,000
