= 2023–24 Liga 3 Aceh =

Tournament details
- Dates: 7 November 2023 – 31 January 2024
- Teams: 25

Final positions
- Champions: PSBL Langsa (2nd title)
- Runners-up: PSAB Aceh Besar
- Third place: Persidi
- Fourth place: PS Peureulak Raya
- Qualified for: 2023–24 Liga 3 National Phase
- All statistics correct as of 31 January 2024.

The 2023–24 Liga 3 Aceh was the eighth season of Liga 3 Aceh as a qualifying round for the national round of the 2023–24 Liga 3.

There are 25 teams participating in the league this season.

== Teams ==
No	Team	Location
1	Kuala Nanggroe	Banda Aceh
2	PSAB	Aceh Besar
3	Persijaya	Aceh Jaya
4	Manyak Payed	Aceh Tamiang
5	Persati	Aceh Tamiang
6	Tamiang United	Aceh Tamiang
7	Juang	Bireuën
8	Benteng Gatra	East Aceh
9	Persidi	East Aceh
10	PSKBS	East Aceh
11	PS Peureulak Raya	East Aceh
12	Tiger Peureulak	East Aceh
13	PSBL	Langsa
14	Putra Langsa	Langsa
15	Kuta Pasee	Lhokseumawe
16	PS Aceh Putra	Lhokseumawe
17	PSLS	Lhokseumawe
18	Dewantara United	North Aceh
19	Mutiara Raya	Pidie
20	Persimura	Pidie
21	PSAP	Pidie
22	PSKTS	Pidie
23	Persas	Sabang
24	Persal	South Aceh
25	Persabar	West Aceh

== First round ==
=== Group A ===
All matches were held at Cot Darat Stadium, Meulaboh.

Pos	Team	Pld	W	D	L	GF	GA	GD	Pts	Qualification	PSL	SIG	SAB	PBR	PMR
1	Persal	4	2	1	1	7	4	+3	7 (Note: Head-to-head points: Persal 4 pts; PSAP 3 pts; Persas 1 pts.)	Qualification to Second round	—	3–1	2–2		
2	PSAP	4	2	1	1	9	6	+3	7	Qualification to Second round		—	3–0		2–2
3	Persas	4	2	1	1	7	8	−1	7	Qualification to Second round			—	2–1	3–2
4	Persabar	4	2	0	2	5	6	−1	6		1–0	1–3		—	
5	Persimura	4	0	1	3	5	9	−4	1		0–2			1–2	—

Source: 2023 Liga 3 Aceh

=== Group B ===
All matches were held at Padang Datar Stadium, Aceh Jaya.

Pos	Team	Pld	W	D	L	GF	GA	GD	Pts	Qualification	JNG	PJY	LHO	MUT	KTS
1	Juang	4	3	0	1	8	4	+4	9 (Note: Head-to-head result: Juang 1–0 Persijaya.)	Qualification to Second round	—	1–0			3–0
2	Persijaya	4	3	0	1	8	1	+7	9	Qualification to Second round		—	3–0		4–0
3	PSLS	4	2	1	1	8	7	+1	7	Qualification to Second round	4–2		—	4–2	
4	Mutiara Raya	4	1	0	3	3	7	−4	3		0–2	0–1		—	
5	PSKTS	4	0	1	3	0	8	−8	1				0–0	0–1	—

Source: 2023 Liga 3 Aceh

=== Group C ===
The first five matches were held at Jantho Sport Center Stadium, Jantho. Then the other matches were held at Putra Samahani Mini Stadium, Kuta Malaka.

Pos	Team	Pld	W	D	L	GF	GA	GD	Pts	Qualification	PAB	PAS	DWU	KNA	APR
1	PSAB	4	2	2	0	14	3	+11	8	Qualification to Second round	—	0–0			10–0
2	Kuta Pase	4	2	1	1	7	4	+3	7 (Note: Head-to-head result: Dewantara United 0–2 Kuta Pase.)	Qualification to Second round		—		1–3	4–1
3	Dewantara United	4	2	1	1	8	4	+4	7	Qualification to Second round	2–2	0–2	—		
4	Kuala Nanggroe	4	2	0	2	13	5	+8	6	Qualification to Second round	1–2		0–1	—	
5	PS Aceh Putra	4	0	0	4	2	28	−26	0				0–5	1–9	—

Source: 2023 Liga 3 Aceh

=== Group D ===
All matches were held at Langsa Stadium, Langsa.

Pos	Team	Pld	W	D	L	GF	GA	GD	Pts	Qualification	IDI	PBL	TFC	KBS	BEN
1	Persidi	4	3	1	0	9	1	+8	10	Qualification to Second round	—			5–0	1–1
2	PSBL	4	2	1	1	13	3	+10	7	Qualification to Second round	0–1	—			6–1
3	Tiger Peureulak	4	1	2	1	3	4	−1	5	Qualification to Second round	0–2	1–1	—		
4	PSKBS	4	1	0	3	2	13	−11	3			0–6	0–1	—	
5	Benteng Gatra	4	0	2	2	4	10	−6	2				1–1	1–2	—

Source: 2023 Liga 3 Aceh

=== Group E ===
All matches were held at Aceh Tamiang Stadium, Aceh Tamiang.

Pos	Team	Pld	W	D	L	GF	GA	GD	Pts	Qualification	TMU	PRY	PST	PLG	PYD
1	Tamiang United	4	2	2	0	5	3	+2	8	Qualification to Second round	—	0–0			2–1
2	PS Peureulak Raya	4	1	3	0	6	2	+4	6	Qualification to Second round		—	4–0	0–0	
3	Persati	4	1	2	1	3	6	−3	5	Qualification to Second round	2–2		—	1–0	
4	Putra Langsa	4	1	1	2	1	2	−1	4		0–1			—	1–0
5	Manyak Payed	4	0	2	2	3	5	−2	2			2–2	0–0		—

Source: 2023 Liga 3 Aceh

=== Ranking of fourth-placed teams ===
Pos	Grp	Team	Pld	W	D	L	GF	GA	GD	Pts	Qualification
1	C	Kuala Nanggroe	4	2	0	2	13	5	+8	6	Qualification to Second round
2	A	Persabar	4	2	0	2	5	6	−1	6	
3	E	Putra Langsa	4	1	1	2	1	2	−1	4	
4	B	Mutiara Raya	4	1	0	3	3	7	−4	3	
5	D	PSKBS	4	1	0	3	2	13	−11	3	

Source: 2023 Liga 3 Aceh

== Second round ==
=== Group F ===
Summary

The first legs will be played on 20–21 December 2023, and the second legs will be played on 22–25 December 2023.

The winners of the ties advanced to the third round.

Team 1	Agg.	Team 2	1st leg	2nd leg
Persas	0–1	PSAB	0–0	0–1
Tiger Peureulak	2–4	Juang	0–1	2–3
PSAP	2–1	Tamiang United	1–0	1–1
Persijaya	1–4	Persidi	1–2	0–2

Matches

20 December 2023
13.30 WIB

Persas	0–0	PSAB
	Report

Langsa Stadium, Langsa
22 December 2023
15.30 WIB

PSAB	1–0	Persas
	Report

Langsa Stadium, Langsa

PSAB won 1–0 on aggregate.

20 December 2023
15.30 WIB

Tiger Peureulak	0–1	Juang
	Report

Langsa Stadium, Langsa
23 December 2023
15.30 WIB

Juang	3–2	Tiger Peureulak
	Report

Langsa Stadium, Langsa

Juang won 4–2 on aggregate.

21 December 2023
13.30 WIB

PSAP	1–0	Tamiang United
	Report

Langsa Stadium, Langsa
24 December 2023
15.30 WIB

Tamiang United	1–1	PSAP
	Report

Langsa Stadium, Langsa

PSAP won 2–1 on aggregate.

21 December 2023
15.30 WIB

Persijaya	1–2	Persidi
	Report

Langsa Stadium, Langsa
25 December 2023
15.30 WIB

Persidi	2–0	Persijaya
	Report

Langsa Stadium, Langsa

Persidi won 4–1 on aggregate.

=== Group G ===
Summary

The first legs will be played on 26–27 December 2023, and the second legs will be played on 28–31 December 2023.

The winners of the ties advanced to the third round.

Team 1	Agg.	Team 2	1st leg	2nd leg
Kuala Nanggroe	2–3	PS Peureulak Raya	2–1	0–2
Persati	5–11	Persal	2–4	3–7
Dewantara United	1–2	PSBL	1–2	0–0
PSLS	2–0	Kuta Pase	0–0	2–0

Matches

26 December 2023
13.30 WIB

Kuala Nanggroe	2–1	PS Peureulak Raya
farid Arkan Sirait 36'; Dian Ardiansyah 54'	Report	Teuku Reza Pratama 86'

Langsa Stadium, Langsa
28 December 2023
15.30 WIB

PS Peureulak Raya	2–0	Kuala Nanggroe
	Report

Langsa Stadium, Langsa

PS Peureulak Raya won 3–2 on aggregate.

26 December 2023
15.30 WIB

Persati	2–4	Persal
Rizky 9', 26'	Report	Rio Ardian 18', 37'; Andre Ardiansyah 58'; Candra Rahmat 81'

Langsa Stadium, Langsa
29 December 2023
15.30 WIB

Persal	7–3	Persati
	Report

Langsa Stadium, Langsa

Persal won 11–5 on aggregate.

27 December 2023
13.30 WIB

Dewantara United	1–2	PSBL
Resi Wahyudi 74'	Report	Fadhil Ibrahim 10'; Jamaludin 21'

Langsa Stadium, Langsa
30 December 2023
15.30 WIB

PSBL	0–0	Dewantara United
	Report

Langsa Stadium, Langsa

PSBL won 2–1 on aggregate.

27 December 2023
15.30 WIB

PSLS	0–0	Kuta Pase
	Report

Langsa Stadium, Langsa
31 December 2023
15.30 WIB

Kuta Pase	0–2	PSLS
	Report

Langsa Stadium, Langsa

PSLS won 2–0 on aggregate.

== Third round ==
=== Group H ===
All matches were held at Langsa Stadium, Langsa.

Pos	Team	Pld	W	D	L	GF	GA	GD	Pts	Qualification
1	PSAB	3	2	1	0	5	1	+4	7	Advance to the Knockout Round
2	Persidi	3	2	1	0	3	0	+3	7	Advance to the Knockout Round
3	PSAP	3	1	0	2	3	5	−2	3	
4	Juang	3	0	0	3	3	8	−5	0	

Source: 2023–24 Liga 3 Aceh
11 January 2024
14.00 WIB

PSAB	4–1	Juang
	Report

Langsa Stadium, Langsa
11 January 2024
16.00 WIB

PSAP	0–2	Persidi
	Report	Muhammad Khadafi 3'; Saifuddin 60'

Langsa Stadium, Langsa

15 January 2024
14.00 WIB

PSAB	1–0	PSAP
	Report

Langsa Stadium, Langsa
15 January 2024
16.00 WIB

Juang	0–1	Persidi
	Report

Langsa Stadium, Langsa

17 January 2024
14.00 WIB

Juang	2–3	PSAP
	Report

Langsa Stadium, Langsa
17 January 2024
16.00 WIB

PSAB	0–0	Persidi
	Report

Langsa Stadium, Langsa

=== Group I ===
All matches were held at Langsa Stadium, Langsa.

Pos	Team	Pld	W	D	L	GF	GA	GD	Pts	Qualification
1	PSBL	3	3	0	0	7	1	+6	9	Advance to the Knockout Round
2	PS Peureulak Raya	3	1	1	1	6	6	0	4	Advance to the Knockout Round
3	Persal	3	1	0	2	3	5	−2	3	
4	PSLS	3	0	1	2	3	7	−4	1	

Source: 2023 Liga 3 Aceh
10 January 2024
14.00 WIB

PS Peureulak Raya	4–2	Persal
Muhammad Maulana 12'; Mukhlis 58', 62', 75'	Report	Zeki Amanda 39', 69'

Langsa Stadium, Langsa
10 January 2024
16.00 WIB

PSBL	4–1	PSLS
Fauzi Alnafis 33'; Muzakir 42'; Jamaludin 48'; Reza Fahmi 60'	Report	Fauzan Azmi 14'

Langsa Stadium, Langsa

14 January 2024
15.30 WIB

PS Peureulak Raya	0–2	PSBL
	Report	Fauzi Alnafis 2'; Reza Fahmi 56'

Langsa Stadium, Langsa
16 January 2024
15.30 WIB

Persal	1–0	PSLS
Zeki Amanda 16'	Report

Langsa Stadium, Langsa

18 January 2024
14.00 WIB

PSLS	2–2	PS Peureulak Raya
M. Rohil Alfaridhi 58'; Asri Akbar 65'	Report	M. Haris Arfianda 31'; M. Fahrizal 55'

Langsa Stadium, Langsa
18 January 2024
16.00 WIB

PSBL	1–0	Persal
Jamaluddin 63'	Report

Langsa Stadium, Langsa

== Knockout round ==
=== Bracket ===
Semi-finals
H1	PSAB	1	2	3
I2	PS Peureulak Raya	0	1	1
H2	Persidi	0	1	1
I1	PSBL	1	1	2

Final
PSAB	2 (2)
PSBL	2 (4)
Third place play-off
PS Peureulak Raya	1
Persidi	2

=== Semi-finals ===
Summary

The first legs will be played on 24–25 January 2024, and the second legs will be played on 28–29 January 2024.

Team 1	Agg.	Team 2	1st leg	2nd leg
PSAB	3–1	PS Peureulak Raya	1–0	2–1
Persidi	1–2	PSBL	0–1	1–1

Matches

24 January 2024
16.00 WIB

PSAB	1–0	PS Peureulak Raya
	Report

Langsa Stadium, Langsa
29 January 2024
15.30 WIB

PS Peureulak Raya	1–2	PSAB
	Report

Langsa Stadium, Langsa

PSAB won 3–1 on aggregate.

25 January 2024
16.00 WIB

Persidi	0–1	PSBL
	Report

Langsa Stadium, Langsa
28 January 2024
15.30 WIB

PSBL	1–1	Persidi
	Report

Langsa Stadium, Langsa

PSBL won 2–1 on aggregate.

=== Third place play-off ===
30 January 2024
15.30 WIB

PS Peureulak Raya	1–2	Persidi
	Report

Langsa Stadium, Langsa

=== Final ===
31 January 2024
15.30 WIB

PSAB	2–2 (a.e.t.)	PSBL
	Report
Penalties
	2–4

Langsa Stadium, Langsa

== Qualification to the national phase ==
Team	Method of qualification	Date of qualification	Qualified to
PSBL Langsa	Champions of 2023–24 Liga 3 Aceh	31 January 2024	2023–24 Liga 3 National Phase
PSAB Aceh Besar	Runner-up of 2023–24 Liga 3 Aceh	31 January 2024	2023–24 Liga 3 National Phase
Persidi	Third-placed team of 2023–24 Liga 3 Aceh	31 January 2024	2023–24 Liga 3 National Phase
PS Peureulak Raya	Fourth-placed team of 2023–24 Liga 3 Aceh	31 January 2024	2023–24 Liga 3 National Phase

== See also ==
- 2023–24 Liga 3 National Phase
