= 2011–12 Indonesian Premier Division Group 1 results =

This article details the 2011–12 Indonesian Premier Division.

== Week 4 ==
21 January 2012

Pro Duta FC	0 - 0	Persikabo
	Report

Baharoeddin Siregar Stadium, Lubuk Pakam

20 January 2012

PSLS Lhokseumawe	1 – 0 (0 - 0)	Persikota
Mahdi Sulaiman 63'	Report

Tunas Bangsa Stadium, Lhokseumawe

20 January 2012

PS Bengkulu	1 – 0 (0 - 0)	PSP Padang
Arif Gunawan 80'	Report

Sawah Besar Stadium, Bengkulu

== Week 3 ==
14 January 2012

Persikabo	1 – 0 (0 - 0)	Persitara
Tugiyadi 60'	Report

Cibinong Stadium, Bogor

13 January 2012

Persikota	3 – 0 (1 - 0)	PS Bengkulu
Ishak Yustinus 40'; Gendut Doni 60'; Abdul Fikri 83'	Report

Benteng Stadium, Tangerang

13 January 2012

PSBL Langsa	0 – 1 (0 - 0)	Pro Duta FC
	Report	Rahmad Hidayat 70'

Langsa Stadium, Langsa

13 January 2012

PSSB Bireuen	0 – 1 (0 - 1)	PSLS Lhokseumawe
	Report	Raul Carlos 29'

H Dimurthala Stadium, Banda Aceh

== Week 2 ==
7 January 2012

Persikota	1 – 1 (1 - 0)	Persitara
Ishak Yustinus 15'	Report	Tantan 74'

Benteng Stadium, Langsa

7 January 2012

PSBL Langsa	2 – 0 (0 - 0)	PSLS Lhokseumawe
Wahyu 52'; Diallo Mamadou Lamarana 86'	Report

Langsa Stadium, Langsa

6 January 2012

PSSB Bireuen	0 – 1 (0 - 1)	Pro Duta FC
	Report	Xavie Perez 42'

H Dimurthala Stadium, Banda Aceh

6 January 2012

PS Bengkulu	0 - 0	Persikabo
	Report

Sawah Besar Stadium, Bengkulu

== Week 1 ==
18 December 2011

PSSB Bireuen	1 – 1 (1 - 0)	PSBL Langsa
Irwanda Putra 23'	Report	Muhammad Azhar 70'

H Dimurthala Stadium, Banda Aceh
