= Yasvani Yusri =

Indonesian footballer

Personal information
- Full name: Yasvani Yusri
- Date of birth: 10 February 1998 (age 28)
- Place of birth: Lhokseumawe, Indonesia
- Height: 1.71 m (5 ft 7 in)
- Position: Right-back

Team information
- Current team: Persiraja Banda Aceh
- Number: 44

Youth career
- 2014: Popda Lhokseumawe
- 2016: Medan Jaya
- 2020–2021: PON Aceh

Senior career*
Years	Team	Apps	(Gls)
2017	PSLS Lhokseumawe		
2018	Celebest		
2018	PSBL Langsa		
2019	PSLS Lhokseumawe		
2019	Persidi Idi		
2021–2022	Persiraja Banda Aceh	11	(0)
2022	PSDS Deli Serdang	5	(0)
2023–2024	Persiraja Banda Aceh	18	(0)
2024	Bekasi City	4	(0)
2024–	Persiraja Banda Aceh	10	(0)
- * Club domestic league appearances and goals as of 24 January 2026

Yasvani Yusri (born 10 February 1998) is an Indonesian professional footballer who plays as a right-back for Liga 2 club Persiraja Banda Aceh.

== Club career ==
=== Persiraja Banda Aceh ===
He was signed for Persiraja Banda Aceh to play in the Liga 1 in the 2021 season. Yasvani made his league debut on 7 January 2022 in a match against PSS Sleman at the Ngurah Rai Stadium, Denpasar.

== Career statistics ==
As of 24 January 2026

Appearances and goals by club, season and competition
Club	Season	League		Cup		Continental		Other		Total	
Club	Season	Apps	Goals	Apps	Goals	Apps	Goals	Apps	Goals	Apps	Goals
Persiraja Banda Aceh	2021	11	0	0	0	–		0	0	11	0
PSDS Deli Serdang	2022–23	5	0	0	0	–		0	0	5	0
Persiraja Banda Aceh	2023–24	18	0	0	0	–		0	0	18	0
Bekasi City	2024–25	4	0	0	0	–		0	0	4	0
Persiraja Banda Aceh	2024–25	7	0	0	0	–		0	0	7	0
Persiraja Banda Aceh	2025–26	3	0	0	0	–		0	0	3	0
Career total		48	0	0	0	0	0	0	0	48	0
