= Abdoe'lxarim MS =

Indonesian politician and independence leader

Abdoe'lxarim M.S.
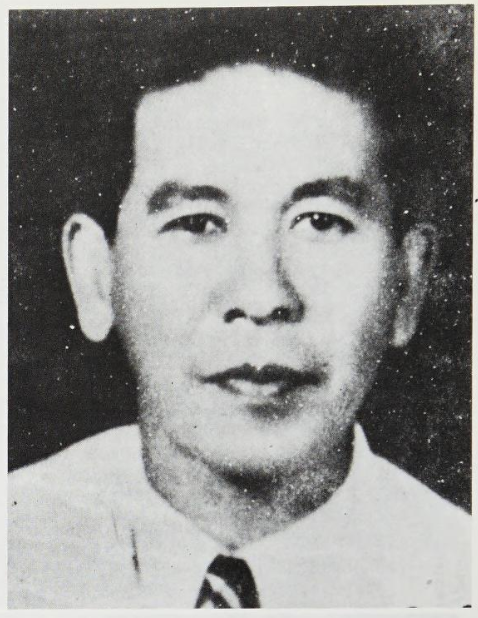
- Abdul Xarim M. S. circa 1940
- Born: Abdoel Karim bin Moehamad Soetan; June 18, 1901; Idi Rayeuk, East Aceh Regency, Dutch East Indies (now Indonesia)
- Died: November 25, 1960 (aged 59)
- Other names: Abdul Xarim, Xarim M.S.
- Occupations: Journalist; politician
- Years active: 1920–1953
- Political party: Communist Party of Indonesia (1924–1926, 1945–1953)
- Other political affiliations: National Indisch Partij (1920–1923; Indonesian National Party (1945)

Abdoe'lxarim M. S. (c. 1901 – 25 November 1960), who was born Abdoel Karim bin Moehamad Soetan, was a journalist and a Communist Party of Indonesia leader. He was interned in Boven-Digoel concentration camp from 1927 to 1932. During World War II, he collaborated with the Japanese and became an important figure in recruiting support for them in Sumatra; after their defeat he then became a key figure in the anti-Dutch republican forces during the Indonesian National Revolution.

== Biography ==
=== Early life and political activity ===
Abdoel Karim bin Moehamad Soetan was born in Idi Rayeuk, East Aceh Regency, Dutch East Indies (now Indonesia) on 18 June 1901 (or possibly 1900). He was childhood friends with Nathar Zainuddin, another future Communist Party leader. He studied for three years in a Dutch-language teacher training school (kweekschool) for native students. He then worked as a Drafter in the Public Works department of Lhokseumawe and became active in trade union politics. During this time, for some reason, he began spelling his name with an X and abbreviated the rest of his name: Abdoe'lxarim M.s. or occasionally variations such as Abdul Xarim or Xarim M.S.

He joined Cipto Mangunkusumo's National Indisch Partij (NIP), a multi-racial radical political party influenced by the Indonesian National Awakening, in around 1920. He was transferred to a new government post in Padang in 1920, and then to Kupang in Timor and Dependencies Residency in 1921. His son Nip Xarim was born in 1921. The objective of the reassignment to distant Kupang in the Eastern Indies may have been to isolate him from politics; he decided to resign his government post and returned to Sumatra and became the NIP commissioner there. In that role he attended the nationalist Sumatran Unity Congress (Dutch: Soematraansch Eenheidscongres, Malay: Congres Persatoean Soematera) in Padang in July 1922. He travelled around Sumatra giving speeches on behalf of the party in Aceh and elsewhere in Sumatra. He became a journalist as well, editing Hindia Sepakat in Sibolga. Although that paper ceased to exist by 1923, in March of that year he was summoned to local court in Medan on a Persdelict (press offense) charge for an editorial he had allowed to be printed during the previous year. In 1923–4 he was editor-in-chief of a tri-monthly magazine named Oetoesan Ra'jat (herald of the people), a revolutionary NIP publication which was published in Langsa. While in Langsa he stepped down from the NIP and joined the Communist Party of Indonesia (Malay: Partai Komunis Indonesia, PKI) and became leader of its first Aceh branch. He rose through its ranks to become a leader in the national executive in 1924, and was appointed as the party's commissioner for Sumatra. He also edited a PKI newspaper published in Tapanoeli Residency called Persamaan (commonality). Because of his high profile and his attempts to hold propaganda meetings around Aceh in 1924, he was ordered to stay in Langsa or face arrest, and was regularly followed by police detectives. In 1925 he was arrested by local police in Aceh after receiving a package from party leaders in Weltevreden (Batavia) and leaving Langsa to conceal it; he was detained for several months. The exactly length of his detention during this period is disputed; some accounts say it was for 13 months and others say it was shorter and that he participated in events in Padang in 1926.

=== Internment in Boven-Digoel and release ===
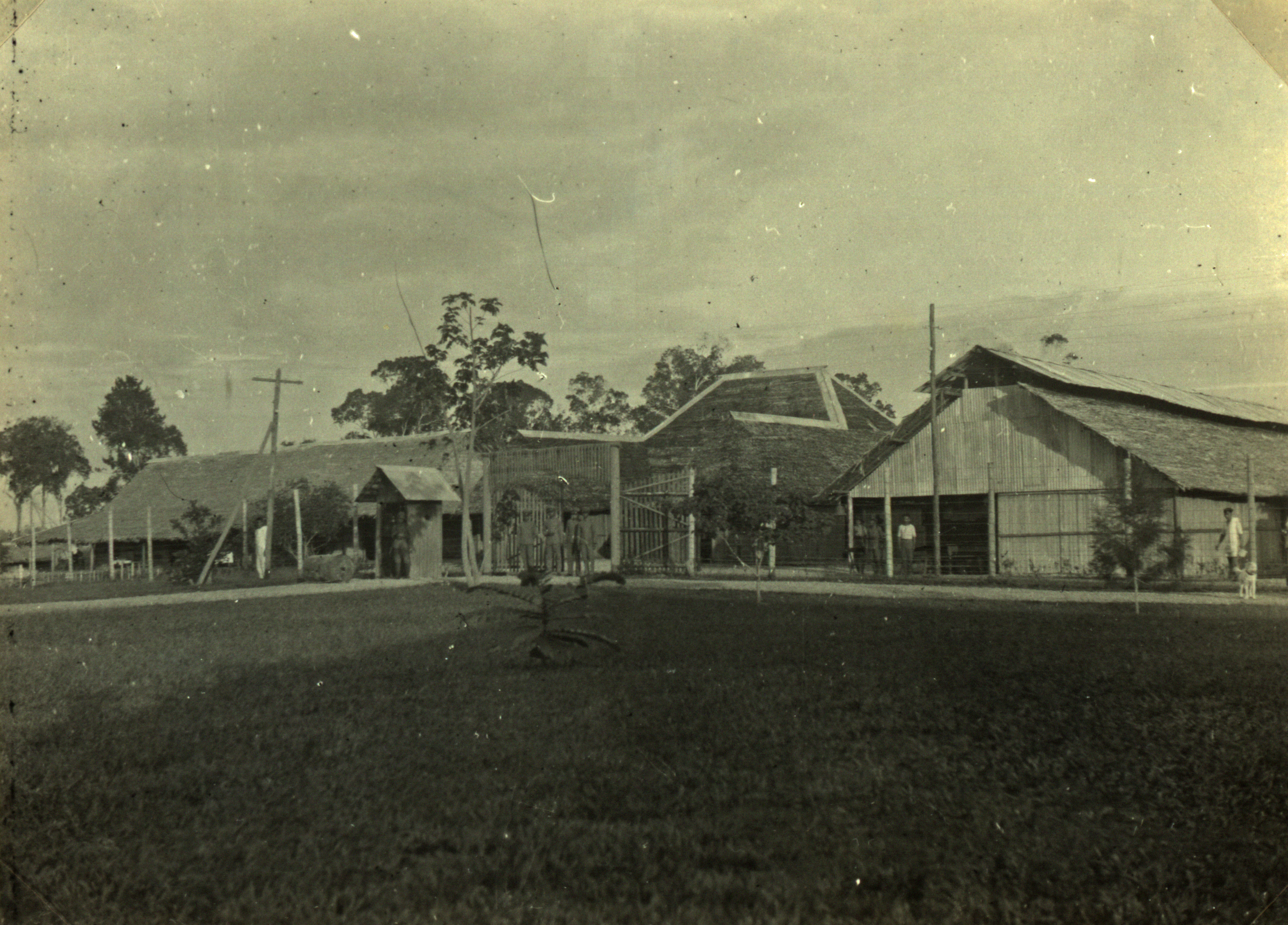
Buildings in the Tanahmerah camp of Boven-Digoel, 1928

Later in 1926 he was detained again during the mass arrests of Communist Party members which took place following a failed uprising in Java. He may have spent up to 7 months again in detention in Aceh without charge during this time. He was ordered to be exiled to the Boven-Digoel concentration camp in May 1927, although his deportation from Aceh was allowed to be delayed for two months until his wife gave birth. Like almost all of the Digoel internees, he was not charged with a crime and was exiled under the "extraordinary rights" allowed to the colonial Governor General. He was interrogated in Yogyakarta in July before being sent on to Digoel. During his time in Digoel he was very active in camp life; he participated in councils organized by internees, and even led a Jazz band. He also filmed a documentary film about life in Digoel with the support of a sympathetic European who sent him materials and equipment from Java. He filmed a lot of footage, recording up to 400 meters of film; out of fear of censorship, he focused on the daily life of internees rather filming a more explicitly political narrative. The local authorities in Boven Digoel Regency had not objected to him making it; after all, internees there were considered to have been exiled and were not legally prisoners. Because he worked well with authorities and was willing to work (unlike many PKI members who refused work), he was released in January 1932.

After his release from Digoel, he was not allowed to return to Aceh or to participate in political activities. He moved to Medan in Sumatra and became a supposedly non-political journalist and writer of short stories, novellas, and nonfiction titles. He also established a printing press called Aneka and founded a weekly paper in Medan called Penjebar.

In 1934 he attempted to receive the film he had made in Boven-Digoel by mail; it had been developed by a company in Surabaya and shipped to him in Langsa where it was intercepted by authorities and sent back to the Attorney General's office in Batavia instead. They suspected that the film was intended for distribution internationally as propaganda against the camp, and so the Attorney General banned the film and kept possession of it. Abdoe'lxarim appealed against this on the grounds that local authorities in Digoel had allowed him to film it; if it could not be returned he asked for 1600 guilders in compensation. Eventually, when authorities determined that much of the film was unplayable, they denied his request for compensation and sent him the film. It is not clear what became of the film. In the late 1930s and early 1940s his role at his weekly newspaper seems to have diminished and he sometimes published in a magazined called Abad 20 during 1939–40.

=== World War II and independence era ===
After the outbreak of World War II, Abdoe'lxarim, who had clandestine contacts with the Japanese consulate in Medan, was arrested by the Dutch and sent to an internment camp in Java. In 1942, after the Japanese occupation of the Dutch East Indies began, he was released from the camp by the Japanese and became an advisor to them. He returned to Medan and was appointed head of public relations for the Japanese occupiers in that city, and eventually into a more national propaganda role. He led recruitment drives for the Heiho. He was briefly jailed by the Kenpeitai in May 1943 because of his Marxist beliefs. After his release later that year, he became a key figure in BOMPA (Indonesian: Badan Oentoek Membantor Pertahanan Asia, Body to Support the Defense of Asia), which was a sort of propaganda organization which was intended to enlist more Indonesians for the Japanese war effort, as well as other similar organizations. During this time he also edited and published in Japanese magazines, including Sumatora Shimbun and Minami. By 1944, however, as the Japanese started to lose the war he began to distance himself from them.

After the Japanese surrender and the Proclamation of Indonesian Independence in 1945, he met with Tengku Mansur and other Sumatran leaders who had collaborated with the Japanese to discuss what to do as the Allied army arrived in Sumatra. After the arrival of the English and the Dutch, he continued to organize supplies for Indonesians who had been enlisted with the Japanese via BOMPA, and eventually reorganized many of them into clandestine pro-republic (anti-Dutch) militias or Pemuda groups. During this period of instability he managed to stockpile weapons as well.

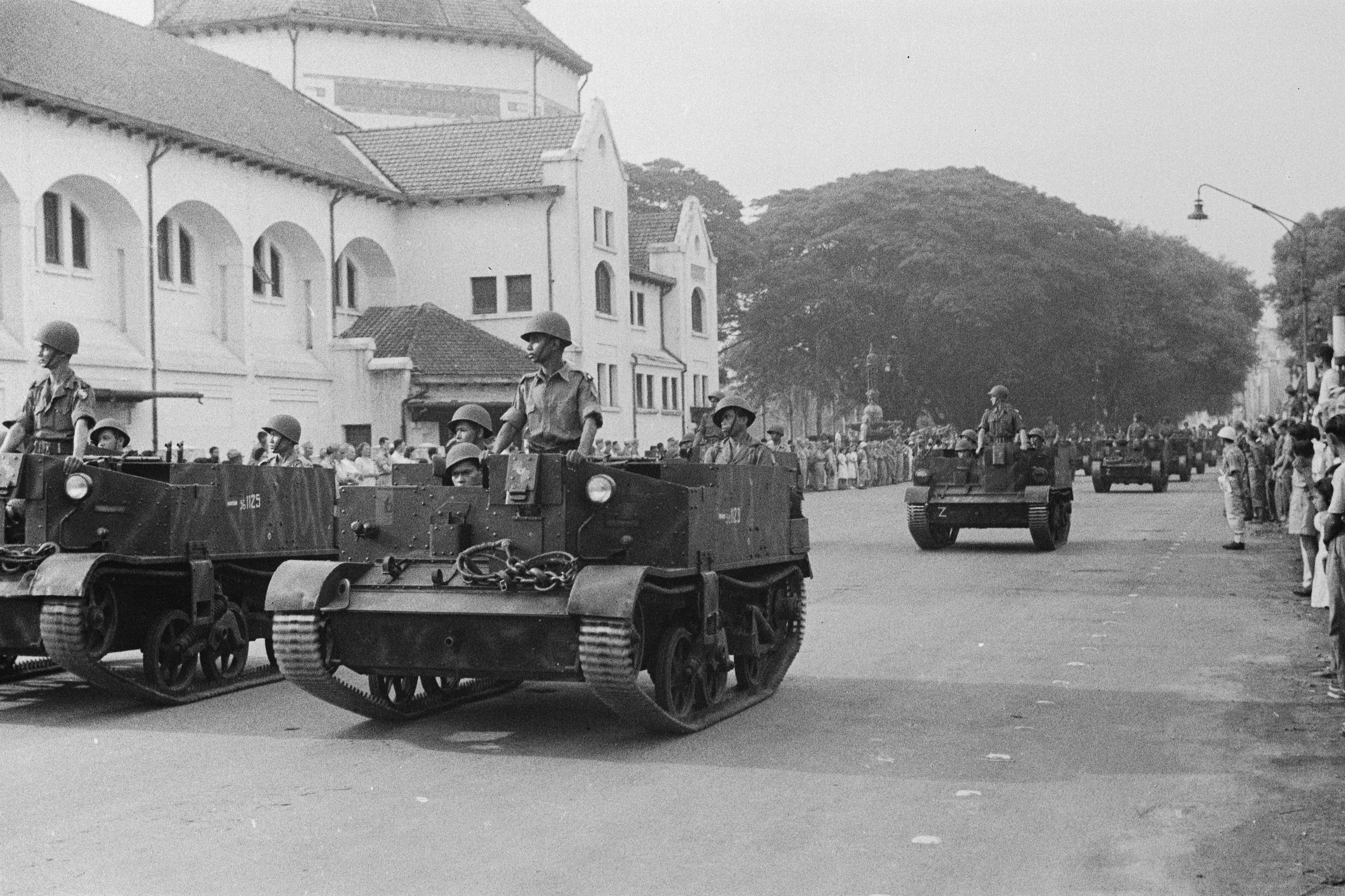
Dutch military parade in Medan, 1947

Due to his level of organization, his rhetorical skills, and his reputation as a leader from the 1920s who had been interned, he became an important figure among the pro-independence forces in Sumatra and the main republican notable in Medan. He was promoted to the rank of Resident in Medan alongside Mangaradja Soeangkoepon and Luat Siregar. During this time, he held roles in various republican parties, being appointed deputy leader in Sumatra for the Indonesian National Party (PNI), building up the organization of the PRI/PESINDO (Socialist Youth) under Sarwono S. Soerardjo, and then defecting from the PNI and founding a local branch of the Communist Party in November 1945. This group did not at first have any connection with the Communist Party in Java; Abdoe'lxarim became the chairman, Luat Siregar became vice-chair and Nathar Zainuddin became an assistant at large. In his new role, Abdoe'lxarim often acted as an intermediary between the republican government in Java and the local youth militias; he believed in a broad coalition of leftist forces and allied himself with Tan Malaka, who had created his own party in Sumatra, and used the Indonesian red-and-white flag rather than the communist flag.

After the end of the Indonesian National Revolution in 1949, he remained in Medan and was appointed as military advisor to Alexander Evert Kawilarang, security commander in North Sumatra; his son Nip Xarim became a military commander in the Indonesian National Armed Forces His role declined in the Communist Party, although he was detained for a time in the August 1951 mass arrests. According to some sources he quit the party in 1952; certainly in early 1953 he was officially expelled from the party because of his "incorrect attitude". He died on 25 November 1960.
