= 2024–25 Liga 4 Aceh =

Liga 4 Aceh
- Season: 2024–25
- Dates: 23 January – 27 February 2025
- Champions: Persidi (1st title)
- National phase: Persidi; PSAB; PS Peureulak Raya
- Matches: 38
- Goals: 110 (2.89 per match)
- Biggest win: Al-Farlaky 0–9 PSLS (16 February 2025)
- Highest scoring: Al-Farlaky 0–9 PSLS (16 February 2025)
- Longest unbeaten run: 11 games — PSAB

The 2024–25 Liga 4 Aceh was the inaugural season of Liga 4 Aceh after the change in the structure of Indonesian football competition and serves as a qualifying round for the national phase of the 2024–25 Liga 4. The competition is organised by the Aceh Provincial PSSI Association.

== Teams ==
=== Participating teams ===
A total of 12 teams are competing in this season.

No	Team	Location	2023–24 season
1	PSAB	Aceh Besar	Runner-up
2	Kuala Nanggroe	Banda Aceh	Second round (Group G)
3	Al-Farlaky	East Aceh	—
4	Persidi	East Aceh	Third place
5	PS Peureulak Raya	East Aceh	Fourth place
6	PSBL	Langsa	Champions
7	Putra Langsa	Langsa	First round (4th in Group E)
8	PSLS	Lhokseumawe	Third round (4th in Group I)
9	Adam Depok	Nagan Raya	—
10	Persas	Sabang	Second round (Group F)
11	Persal	South Aceh	Third round (3rd in Group I)
12	Tajura Aceh	South Aceh	—

=== Personnel and kits ===
Note: Flags indicate national team as has been defined under FIFA eligibility rules. Players and coaches may hold more than one non-FIFA nationality.

Team	Head coach	Captain	Kit manufacturer	Main kit sponsor	Other kit sponsor(s)
Adam Depok			(Indonesia) Guzel	Rajawali Mitra Selatan	List: Front: Back: Sleeves: Shorts:
Al-Farlaky			(Indonesia) Trops	Iskandar Al-Farlaky	List: Front: Back: Sleeves: Shorts:
Kuala Nanggroe			(Indonesia) Guzel (1st match) (Indonesia) Trops (2nd match onwards)	Guzel (1st match) / 3-Sport (2nd match onwards)	List: Front: None (1st match) / CV Gagah Rayya, Mami Rose, Friends Celluler (2nd match onwards); Back: Sleeves: Shorts:
Persal					List: Front: Back: Sleeves: Shorts:
Persas			(Indonesia) Northon	BYOND	List: Front: Sabang, Bank Aceh; Back: None; Sleeves: Northon; Shorts: None
Persidi	(Indonesia) Saifuddin			BPMA	List: Front: MedcoEnergi, Bank Syariah Indonesia, Bank Aceh; Back: Sleeves: Shorts:
PSAB					List: Front: Back: Sleeves: Shorts:
PSBL	(Indonesia) Mukhlis Rasyid		(Indonesia) Made by club	PTPN IV Regional 6	List: Front: Bank Syariah Indonesia, Langsa City Government, Nasir Djamil, Ship Ilham Pangestu, Dek Fan Foundation; Back: Yamaha; Sleeves: Shorts:
PSLS			(Indonesia) BolaAceh Apparel	BERAKHLK MHS-TIMS	List: Front: Lemona, Bank Aceh, M:NEK; Back: Awak Lhokseumawe, News RB, Aceh World Time; Sleeves: Shorts:
PS Peureulak Raya				Indo Buana Group	List: Front: Bank Syariah Indonesia KCP Peureulak 2, Fattah Fikri Group; Back: Sleeves: Shorts:
Putra Langsa			(Indonesia) Trops	Dek Fan Foundation	List: Front: Penerbit Erlangga; Back: Sleeves: Shorts:
Tajura Aceh					List: Front: Back: Sleeves: Shorts:

== Schedule ==
The schedule of the competition is as follows.

Round	Matchday	Date			
First round	—N/a	Group A	Group B	Group C	Group D
First round	Matchday 1	24 January 2025	23 January 2025	25 January 2025	26 January 2025
First round	Matchday 2	26 January 2025	25 January 2025	27 January 2025	28 January 2025
First round	Matchday 3	28 January 2025	27 January 2025	29 January 2025	30 January 2025
Second round
Second round	Matchday 1	12 February 2025			
Second round	Matchday 2	13 February 2025			
Second round	Matchday 3	15 February 2025			
Championship round
Championship round	Matchday 1	21 February 2025			
Championship round	Matchday 2	22 February 2025			
Championship round	Matchday 3	23 February 2025			
Championship round	Matchday 4	24 February 2025			
Championship round	Matchday 5	25 February 2025			
Championship round	Matchday 6	26 February 2025			
Third place play-off & Final		27 February 2025			

== First round ==
The draw for the first round took place on 12 December 2024 at the PSSI Secretariat of the Aceh Provincial Association, Banda Aceh. The 12 teams will be drawn into 4 groups of three based on the geographical location of their homebase. The first round will be played in a home tournament format of single round-robin matches.

The top two teams of each group will qualify for the second round.

=== Group A ===
All matches will be held at Sabang Merauke Stadium, Sabang.

Pos	Team	Pld	W	D	L	GF	GA	GD	Pts	Qualification	SAL	TAJ	ADM
1	Persal	2	0	2	0	3	3	0	2	Qualification to the Second round		—	1–1
2	Tajura Aceh (D)	2	0	2	0	5	5	0	2	Disqualified (Note: Tajura Aceh and Adam Depok was disqualified by the Aceh Provincial PSSI Association Disciplinary Committee due to the match that both teams played did not meet the criteria for fair play elements or violated the rules of sportsmanship and behavior that apply in football. The committee also impose sanctions which prohibit the registration of players against both clubs in any of official Aceh Provincial PSSI Association competition for the next season.)	2–2		—
3	Adam Depok (D)	2	0	2	0	4	4	0	2	Disqualified	—	Ann.	

Source: Liga 4 Aceh
Rules for classification: 1) Points; 2) Head-to-head points; 3) Head-to-head goal difference; 4) Head-to-head goals scored; 5) Goal difference; 6) Goals scored; 7) Fair-play points; 8) Draw.
(D) Disqualified
Notes:

Matches

Matchday 1 (24 January)
24 January 2025
16:00 UTC+7

Tajura Aceh	2–2	Persal
	Report

Sabang Merauke Stadium, Sabang

Matchday 2 (26 January)
26 January 2025
16:00 UTC+7

Persal	1–1	Adam Depok
	Report

Sabang Merauke Stadium, Sabang

Matchday 3 (28 January)
28 January 2025
16:00 UTC+7

Adam Depok	~~3–3~~ Annulled	Tajura Aceh
	Report

Sabang Merauke Stadium, Sabang

=== Group B ===
All matches will be held at Sabang Merauke Stadium, Sabang.

Pos	Team	Pld	W	D	L	GF	GA	GD	Pts	Qualification	PAB	KNA	SAS
1	PSAB	2	1	1	0	3	2	+1	4	Qualification to the Second round		1–1	—
2	Kuala Nanggroe	2	1	1	0	3	2	+1	4	Qualification to the Second round	—		2–1
3	Persas (H)	2	0	0	2	2	4	−2	0		1–2	—	

Source: Liga 4 Aceh
Rules for classification: 1) Points; 2) Head-to-head points; 3) Head-to-head goal difference; 4) Head-to-head goals scored; 5) Goal difference; 6) Goals scored; 7) Fair-play points; 8) Draw.
(H) Hosts

Matches

Matchday 1 (23 January)
23 January 2025
16:00 UTC+7

Kuala Nanggroe	2–1	Persas
	Report

Sabang Merauke Stadium, Sabang

Matchday 2 (25 January)
25 January 2025
16:00 UTC+7

Persas	1–2	PSAB
	Report

Sabang Merauke Stadium, Sabang

Matchday 3 (27 January)
27 January 2025
16:00 UTC+7

PSAB	1–1	Kuala Nanggroe
	Report

Sabang Merauke Stadium, Sabang

=== Group C ===
All matches will be held at Langsa Stadium, Langsa.

Pos	Team	Pld	W	D	L	GF	GA	GD	Pts	Qualification	PLS	PBL	PRY
1	PSLS	2	1	1	0	2	1	+1	4	Qualification to the Second round		1–1	—
2	PSBL (H)	2	0	2	0	2	2	0	2	Qualification to the Second round	—		1–1
3	PS Peureulak Raya	2	0	1	1	1	2	−1	1	Qualification to the Second round	0–1	—	

Source: Liga 4 Aceh
Rules for classification: 1) Points; 2) Head-to-head points; 3) Head-to-head goal difference; 4) Head-to-head goals scored; 5) Goal difference; 6) Goals scored; 7) Fair-play points; 8) Draw.
(H) Hosts

Matches

Matchday 1 (25 January)
25 January 2025
16:00 UTC+7

PSBL	1–1	PS Peureulak Raya
	Report

Langsa Stadium, Langsa

Matchday 2 (27 January)
27 January 2025
16:00 UTC+7

PS Peureulak Raya	0–1	PSLS
	Report

Langsa Stadium, Langsa

Matchday 3 (29 January)
29 January 2025
16:00 UTC+7

PSLS	1–1	PSBL
	Report

Langsa Stadium, Langsa

=== Group D ===
All matches will be held at Langsa Stadium, Langsa.

Pos	Team	Pld	W	D	L	GF	GA	GD	Pts	Qualification	FAR	IDI	PUT
1	Al-Farlaky	2	1	1	0	3	2	+1	4	Qualification to the Second round		1–0	—
2	Persidi	2	1	0	1	3	1	+2	3	Qualification to the Second round	—		3–0
3	Putra Langsa (H)	2	0	1	1	2	5	−3	1		2–2	—	

Source: Liga 4 Aceh
Rules for classification: 1) Points; 2) Head-to-head points; 3) Head-to-head goal difference; 4) Head-to-head goals scored; 5) Goal difference; 6) Goals scored; 7) Fair-play points; 8) Draw.
(H) Hosts

Matches

Matchday 1 (26 January)
26 January 2025
16:00 UTC+7

Al-Farlaky	1–0	Persidi
	Report

Langsa Stadium, Langsa

Matchday 2 (28 January)
28 January 2025
16:00 UTC+7

Persidi	3–0	Putra Langsa
	Report

Langsa Stadium, Langsa

Matchday 3 (30 January)
30 January 2025
16:00 UTC+7

Putra Langsa	2–2	Al-Farlaky
	Report

Langsa Stadium, Langsa

=== Ranking of third-placed teams ===
Pos	Grp	Team	Pld	W	D	L	GF	GA	GD	Pts	Qualification
1	C	PS Peureulak Raya	2	0	1	1	1	2	−1	1	Qualification to the Second round
2	D	Putra Langsa	2	0	1	1	2	5	−3	1	
3	B	Persas	2	0	0	2	2	4	−2	0	

Source: Liga 4 Aceh
Rules for classification: 1) Points; 2) Goal difference; 3) Goals scored; 4) Fair-play points; 5) Draw.

== Second round ==
A total of 8 teams will be drawn into two groups of four. The group stage will be played in a home tournament format of single round-robin matches.

The top two teams of each group will qualify for the championship round.

=== Group E ===
All matches will be held at USK Mini Stadium, Banda Aceh.

Pos	Team	Pld	W	D	L	GF	GA	GD	Pts	Qualification	PAB	PRY	KNA	SAL
1	PSAB (H)	3	1	2	0	4	3	+1	5	Qualification to the Championship round			1–1	1–0
2	PS Peureulak Raya	3	1	1	1	4	5	−1	4 (Note: Ranked on head-to-head points: PS Peureulak Raya 3, Kuala Nanggroe 0.)	Qualification to the Championship round	2–2			
3	Kuala Nanggroe	3	1	1	1	3	3	0	4			1–2		
4	Persal	3	1	0	2	2	2	0	3			2–0	0–1	

Source: Liga 4 Aceh
Rules for classification: 1) Points; 2) Head-to-head points; 3) Head-to-head goal difference; 4) Head-to-head goals scored; 5) Goal difference; 6) Goals scored; 7) Fair-play points; 8) Draw.
(H) Hosts
Notes:

Matches

Matchday 1 (12 February 2025)
12 February 2025
14:00 WIB (UTC+7)

Persal	2–0	PS Peureulak Raya
	Report

USK Mini Stadium, Banda Aceh
12 February 2025
16:00 WIB (UTC+7)

PSAB	1–1	Kuala Nanggroe
	Report

USK Mini Stadium, Banda Aceh

Matchday 2 (13 February 2025)
13 February 2025
14:00 WIB (UTC+7)

Kuala Nanggroe	1–2	PS Peureulak Raya
	Report

USK Mini Stadium, Banda Aceh
13 February 2025
16:00 WIB (UTC+7)

PSAB	1–0	Persal
	Report

USK Mini Stadium, Banda Aceh

Matchday 3 (15 February 2025)
15 February 2025
14:00 WIB (UTC+7)

Persal	0–1	Kuala Nanggroe
	Report

USK Mini Stadium, Banda Aceh
15 February 2025
16:00 WIB (UTC+7)

PS Peureulak Raya	2–2	PSAB
	Report

USK Mini Stadium, Banda Aceh

=== Group F ===
All matches will be held at Langsa Stadium, Langsa.

Pos	Team	Pld	W	D	L	GF	GA	GD	Pts	Qualification	PBL	IDI	PLS	FAR
1	PSBL (H)	3	1	2	0	6	5	+1	5	Qualification to the Championship round			2–2	3–2
2	Persidi	3	1	1	1	5	6	−1	4 (Note: Ranked on head-to-head points: Persidi 3, PSLS 0.)	Qualification to the Championship round	1–1			
3	PSLS	3	1	1	1	12	4	+8	4			1–2		
4	Al-Farlaky	3	1	0	2	6	14	−8	3			4–2	0–9	

Source: Liga 4 Aceh
Rules for classification: 1) Points; 2) Head-to-head points; 3) Head-to-head goal difference; 4) Head-to-head goals scored; 5) Goal difference; 6) Goals scored; 7) Fair-play points; 8) Draw.
(H) Hosts
Notes:

Matches

Matchday 1 (12 February 2025)
12 February 2025
14:00 WIB (UTC+7)

Al-Farlaky	4–2	Persidi
	Report

Langsa Stadium, Langsa
12 February 2025
16:00 WIB (UTC+7)

PSBL	2–2	PSLS
	Report

Langsa Stadium, Langsa

Matchday 2 (13 February 2025)
13 February 2025
14:00 WIB (UTC+7)

PSLS	1–2	Persidi
	Report

Langsa Stadium, Langsa
13 February 2025
16:00 WIB (UTC+7)

PSBL	3–2	Al-Farlaky
	Report

Langsa Stadium, Langsa

Matchday 3 (16 February 2025)
16 February 2025
14:00 WIB (UTC+7)

Al-Farlaky	0–9	PSLS
	Report

Langsa Stadium, Langsa
16 February 2025
16:00 WIB (UTC+7)

Persidi	1–1	PSBL
	Report

Langsa Stadium, Langsa

== Championship round ==
The top 4 teams from the second round will be played in a centralized format of home-and-away round-robin matches. The top 2 teams from this round will be played in the final to determined the champions and qualified to the national phase while the remaining teams will be played in the third place play-off.

All matches will be held at USK Mini Stadium, Banda Aceh.

Pos	Team	Pld	W	D	L	GF	GA	GD	Pts	Promotion or qualification	PAB	IDI	PBL	PRY
1	PSAB (H)	6	4	2	0	9	2	+7	14	Qualification for the final & national phase		1–1	1–1	2–0
2	Persidi (C)	6	3	2	1	8	5	+3	11	Qualification for the final & national phase	0–1		3–2	2–0
3	PSBL	6	1	3	2	10	10	0	6	Qualification to the third place play-off	0–1	1–1		1–1
4	PS Peureulak Raya	6	0	1	5	4	14	−10	1	Qualification to the third place play-off	0–3	0–1	3–5	

Source: Liga 4 Aceh
Rules for classification: 1) Points; 2) Head-to-head points; 3) Head-to-head goal difference; 4) Head-to-head goals scored; 5) Goal difference; 6) Goals scored; 7) Fair-play points; 8) Draw.
(C) Champions; (H) Hosts

Matches

Matchday 1 (21 February)
21 February 2025
14:00 UTC+7

PSBL	1–1	Persidi
	Report

USK Mini Stadium, Banda Aceh
21 February 2025
16:00 UTC+7

PSAB	2–0	PS Peureulak Raya
	Report

USK Mini Stadium, Banda Aceh

Matchday 2 (22 February)
22 February 2025
14:00 UTC+7

PSBL	1–1	PS Peureulak Raya
	Report

USK Mini Stadium, Banda Aceh
22 February 2025
16:00 UTC+7

Persidi	0–1	PSAB
	Report

USK Mini Stadium, Banda Aceh

Matchday 3 (23 February)
23 February 2025
14:00 UTC+7

PS Peureulak Raya	0–1	Persidi
	Report

USK Mini Stadium, Banda Aceh
23 February 2025
16:00 UTC+7

PSAB	1–1	PSBL
	Report

USK Mini Stadium, Banda Aceh

Matchday 4 (24 February)
24 February 2025
14:00 UTC+7

Persidi	3–2	PSBL
	Report

USK Mini Stadium, Banda Aceh
24 February 2025
16:00 UTC+7

PS Peureulak Raya	0–3	PSAB
	Report

USK Mini Stadium, Banda Aceh

Matchday 5 (25 February)
25 February 2025
14:00 UTC+7

PS Peureulak Raya	3–5	PSBL
	Report

USK Mini Stadium, Banda Aceh
25 February 2025
16:00 UTC+7

PSAB	1–1	Persidi
	Report

USK Mini Stadium, Banda Aceh

Matchday 6 (26 February)
26 February 2025
14:00 UTC+7

Persidi	2–0	PS Peureulak Raya
	Report

USK Mini Stadium, Banda Aceh
26 February 2025
16:00 UTC+7

PSBL	0–1	PSAB
	Report

USK Mini Stadium, Banda Aceh

== Third place play-off ==
The third place play-off will be played as a single match. If tied after regulation time, extra time and, if necessary, a penalty shoot-out will be used to decide the winning team. The winner will qualify for the national phase.

27 February 2025
13:00 UTC+7

PSBL	1–1 (a.e.t.)	PS Peureulak Raya
	Report
Penalties
	4–5

USK Mini Stadium, Banda Aceh

== Final ==
The final will be played as a single match. If tied after regulation time, extra time and, if necessary, a penalty shoot-out will be used to decide the winning team.

27 February 2025 (Note: The PSAB vs Persidi match was played as scheduled and ran for the full 90 minutes plus 30 minutes of extra time with both teams tied 1–1, before being postponed due to the lack of stadium lighting and also the approaching Maghrib prayer. After a meeting between the two teams and the match organizing committee, it was decided that the penalty shootout will be continued tomorrow morning.)
15:00 UTC+7

PSAB	1–1 (a.e.t.)	Persidi
	Report
Penalties
	4–5

USK Mini Stadium, Banda Aceh

== See also ==
- 2024–25 Liga 4
