= Ichwani Hasanuddin =

Indonesian footballer

Ichwani Hasan
Personal information
- Full name: Ichwani Hasanuddin
- Date of birth: 6 June 1986 (age 40)
- Place of birth: Indonesia
- Height: 1.68 m (5 ft 6 in)
- Position: Midfielder

Senior career*
Years	Team	Apps	(Gls)
2008–2015	PSAP Sigli	117	(17)
- * Club domestic league appearances and goals as of 11 July 2012

Ichwani Hasanuddin (born June 6, 1986) is an Indonesian former footballer.

== Club statistics ==
Club	Season	Super League		Premier Division		Piala Indonesia		Total	
Club	Season	Apps	Goals	Apps	Goals	Apps	Goals	Apps	Goals
PSAP Sigli	2011-12	33	0	-		-		33	0
Total		33	0	-		-		33	0
