= PSKBS Kuta Binjei =

Indonesian football club

- Full name: Persatuan Sepakbola Kuta Binjei Sekitar
- Nickname: Laskar TM Djafar
- Short name: PSKBS
- Ground: TM Djafar Stadium; East Aceh, Aceh
- Owner: PSSI East Aceh Regency
- Manager: Muhammad Yakob Taib
- League: Liga 3
- 2023: 4th in Group D, (Aceh zone)
Home colours	Away colours

Persatuan Sepakbola Kuta Binjei Sekitar (simply known as PSKBS) is an Indonesian football club based in East Aceh Regency, Aceh. They currently compete in the Liga 3.
