= Akhirul Wadhan =

Indonesian footballer

Personal information
- Full name: Akhirul Wadhan
- Date of birth: 26 September 1997 (age 29)
- Place of birth: Tualang, Siak, Indonesia
- Height: 1.72 m (5 ft 8 in)
- Position: Forward

Youth career
- PS Peureulak Raya

Senior career*
Years	Team	Apps	(Gls)
2018	Aceh United	16	(0)
2019	PS Peureulak Raya	12	(2)
2021–2022	Persiraja Banda Aceh	14	(1)
2022–2024	PSDS Deli Serdang	4	(0)
2025	PS Peureulak Raya		
2025–2026	Persiraja Banda Aceh	2	(0)
- * Club domestic league appearances and goals as of 25 October 2025

Akhirul Wadhan (born 26 September 1997) is an Indonesian professional footballer who plays as a forward.

== Club career ==
=== Persiraja Banda Aceh ===
He was signed for Persiraja Banda Aceh to play in the Liga 1 in the 2021 season. Wadhan made his league debut on 7 January 2022 in a match against PSS Sleman at the Ngurah Rai Stadium, Denpasar.

== Career statistics ==
=== Club ===
As of 25 October 2025.

Club	Season	League			Cup		Continental		Other		Total	
Club	Season	Division	Apps	Goals	Apps	Goals	Apps	Goals	Apps	Goals	Apps	Goals
Aceh United	2018	Liga 2	16	0	0	0	–		0	0	16	0
PS Peureulak Raya	2019	Liga 3	12	2	0	0	–		0	0	12	2
Persiraja Banda Aceh	2021–22	Liga 1	14	1	0	0	–		0	0	14	1
PSDS Deli Serdang	2022–23	Liga 2	4	0	0	0	–		0	0	4	0
Persiraja Banda Aceh	2025–26	Championship	2	0	0	0	–		0	0	2	0
Career total			48	3	0	0	0	0	0	0	48	3
