= Tamiang United F.C. =

Association football club in Indonesia

Tamiang United FC
- Full name: Tamiang United Football Club
- Nicknames: Skuad Muda Sedia (Young and Ready Squad)
- Short name: TUFC
- Founded: 24 November 2017; 8 years ago
- Ground: Musafat Field; Aceh Tamiang, Aceh
- Capacity: 1,000
- Owner: Aceh Tamiang Government
- Chairman: Ibnu Azis
- Manager: Awaluddin
- Coach: Muhammad Diah
- League: Liga 4
- 2023: Round of 16, (Aceh zone)
Home colours	Away colours

Tamiang United Football Club (simply known as Tamiang United of TUFC) is an Indonesian football club based in Aceh Tamiang Regency, Aceh. They currently compete in the Liga 3. On 24 November 2017, when the PSSI congress became a momentum for them, Tamiang United was inaugurated as a new member of PSSI and was ready to compete in Indonesian Liga 4 for the first time.

== History ==
Founded in 2017, Tamiang United made club debut into Indonesian football by joining the third-tier league Indonesia Liga 3 in 2019. On 1 August 2019, Tamiang United made their first league match debut in a 1–1 draw against PSBL Langsa. Until the end of the competition, the club was only ranked 5th in the group stage of the Liga 3 Aceh zone.
