= Persati Aceh Tamiang =

Indonesian football club

Persati
- Full name: Persatuan Sepakbola Aceh Tamiang
- Nicknames: Panser Tamiang (Tamiang Panzer); Laskar Raja Muda Sedia (Raja Muda Sedia Warriors)
- Founded: 1965; 61 years ago
- Ground: Aceh Tamiang Stadium; Aceh Tamiang; Aceh
- Capacity: 2,000
- Owner: PSSI Aceh Tamiang
- Chairman: Umar Syahdan, SE
- Manager: Muttaqin
- Coach: Zulkifli
- League: Liga 3
- 2023: Round of 16,(Aceh zone)
Home colours	Away colours

Persatuan Sepakbola Aceh Tamiang (simply known as Persati) is an Indonesian football club based in Aceh Tamiang, Aceh. They currently play in Liga 3.

== Honours ==
- Soeratin Cup U13 Aceh
  - Champion (1): 2023
