= Kuta Pase F.C. =

Indonesian football club in Aceh

Kuta Pasee
- Full name: Kuta Pasee Football Club
- Nickname: Laskar Singa Buraq (Buraq Lions Warriors)
- Short name: KPA
- Founded: 2015; 11 years ago
- Ground: PT Arun Stadium; Lhokseumawe, Aceh
- Capacity: 8,000
- Owner: Lhokseumawe Government
- Chairman: Mansur Paloh
- Manager: Ismail A Manaf
- Coach: H. Safran
- League: Liga 4
- 2023: Round of 16, (Aceh zone)
| Home colours | Away colours |

Kuta Pasee Football Club (simply known as Kuta Pasee) is an Indonesian football club based in Lhokseumawe, Aceh. They currently compete in the Liga 4 and their homeground is PT Arun Stadium.
