= Dewantara United F.C. =

Indonesian football club in Aceh

Dewantara United
- Full name: Dewantara United Football Club
- Nickname: Laskar Dewantara
- Short name: DUFC
- Founded: 2010; 16 years ago
- Ground: PT. Pupuk Iskandar Muda Stadium; North Aceh, Aceh
- Capacity: 2,000
- Owner: Askab PSSI Aceh Utara
- Chairman: Fakhrurrazi H. Cut
- Manager: Jamaludin H. Cut
- Coach: Jessie Mustamu
- League: Liga 4
- 2023 Liga 3: Round of 16, (Aceh zone)
| Home colours | Away colours |

Dewantara United Football Club (simply known as DUFC or Dewantara United) is an Indonesian football club based in Dewantara, North Aceh, Aceh. They currently compete in the Liga 4 and their homeground is PT. Pupuk Iskandar Muda Stadium.

== Honours ==
- Langsa City Independence Cup
  - Champion: 2015
