= Peureulak Sultanate =

Sultanate in Sumatra

- 840–1292
- Common languages: Old Malay
- Religion: Islam
- Government: Monarchy
- Sultan
- History
  - Foundation: 840
  - Disestablished: 1292
- Currency: Dirham coins
Succeeded by
Samudera Pasai Sultanate
- Today part of: Indonesia

The Peureulak Sultanate (Note: Also called the Perlak Sultanate.) was the first Muslim state in Southeast Asia, believed to have converted to Islam as early as the 9th century. The location of Peureulak is in what is now the East Aceh Regency, Indonesia.

Perlak or Peureulak is well known as a perlak wood producing area, a type of wood that is very good for ship building and house building. Its natural products and strategic position made Perlak develop as a commercial port that advanced in the 8th century, visited by ships which included Arab and Persian origin. This led to the development of Islamic societies in this area, mainly as a result of mixed marriages between Muslim merchants and local women.

== Hikayat Aceh ==
The Hikayat Aceh text reveals that the spread of Islam in northern Sumatra was carried out by an Arab scholar named Sheikh Abdullah Arif in 1112. The book Zhufan Zhi (諸蕃 志), written by Zhao Rugua in 1225, cited the record of a geographer, Chou Ku-fei, in 1178 that there is a Muslim country with only five days of voyage from Java. Perhaps the intended land is Peureulak because Chu-fan-chi declared a voyage from Java to Brunei took 15 days. The existence of the Peureulak state was reinforced by the famous Venetian traveller Marco Polo a century later. When Marco Polo returned from China by the sea in 1291, he stopped in the state of Ferlec who had embraced Islam.

== Development and turbulence ==
The first Sultan of Perlak was Sultan Alaiddin Syed Maulana Abdul Aziz Shah, a Shiite of Arabian descent, who founded the Perlak Sultanate on 1 Muharram 225 H (840 AD). He renamed the royal capital from Bandar Perlak to Caliph City. The Sultan was buried in Paya Meuligo, Peureulak, East Aceh, alongside his wife, Princess Meurah Mahdum Khudawi.

During the reign of the third sultan, Sultan Alaiddin Syed Maulana Abbas Shah, the Sunni movement began to enter Perlak. After the death of the sultan in 363 AH (913 AD), there was a civil war between Shiite and Sunnis so that for the next two years there was no sultan. The Shiites won the war and in 302 H (915 AD) and Sultan Alaiddin Syed Maulana Ali Mughat Shah from the Shi'ite stream ascended. At the end of his reign, there was another turmoil between Shiite and Sunni rulers. This time, the Sunni rulers won and subsequent sultans came from the Sunni stream.

In 362 H (956 AD), after the death of the seventh sultan, Sultan Makhdum Alaiddin Abdul Malik Shah Johan Sovereignty, there was another upheaval for about four years between Shia and Sunni which ended with peace and division of the empire into two parts:

- Perlak Pesisir/Coastal Perlak (Shia), led by Sultan Alaiddin Syed Maulana Shah (986 – 988)
- Perlak Pedalaman/Inland Perlak (Sunni), led by Sultan Makhdum Alaiddin Malik Ibrahim Shah Johan Berdaulat (986 – 1023)

Sultan Alaiddin Syed Maulana Shah died when the Kingdom of Sriwijaya invaded Perlak and the whole of Perlak reunited under the leadership of Sultan Makhdum Alaiddin Malik Ibrahim Shah Johan Berdaulat, who continued the struggle against Sriwijaya until 1006.

== Merge with Samudera Pasai ==
The 17th Sultan of Perlak, Sultan Makhdum Alaiddin Malik Muhammad Amin Shah II Johan Berdaulat (ruled 1230 – 1267) carried out friendship politics by marrying his daughter Princess Ganggang, to the King of the Kingdom of Pasai, Al Malik al-Saleh.

The last Sultan of Perlak was the 18th Sultan, Sultan Makhdum Alaiddin Malik Abdul Aziz Johan Berdaulat (ruled 1267 – 1292). After he died, Perlak was united with the Samudera Pasai Kingdom under the reign of Sultan Samudera Pasai, Sultan Muhammad Malik Al Zahir, son of Al Malik al-Saleh.

== Religion ==
Perlak was the center of early Islamic learning in the Malay Archipelago. The Perlak sultans patronized foreign scholars and missionaries who were mainly Persian Shi'ites. The Islamic scholars from Perlak also worked as missionaries further afield to convert the Malays living across the Strait of Malacca. Sunni Islam became popular by the reign of Sultan Alaiddin Syed Maulana Abbas Shah and both sects flourished and at times influenced each other. Despite the division of Perlak into two kingdoms, both continued to dispatch missionaries to nearby Malay kingdoms.

== List of sultans of Perlak ==
The Perlak sultans can be grouped into two dynasties: the Syed Maulana Abdul Azis Shah dynasty and the Johan Bedaulat dynasty.

1. Sultan Alaiddin Syed Maulana Abdul Azis Shah (840 – 864)
2. Sultan Alaiddin Syed Maulana Abdul Rahim Shah (864 – 888)
3. Sultan Alaiddin Syed Maulana Abbas Shah (888 – 913)
4. Sultan Alaiddin Syed Maulana Ali Mughat Shah (915 – 918)
5. Sultan Makhdum Alaiddin Malik Abdul Kadir Shah Johan Berdaulat (928 – 932)
6. Sultan Makhdum Alaiddin Malik Muhammad Amin Shah Johan Berdaulat (932 – 956)
7. Sultan Makhdum Alaiddin Abdul Malik Shah Johan Berdaulat (956 – 983)
8. Sultan Makhdum Alaiddin Malik Ibrahim Shah Johan Berdaulat (986 – 1023)
9. Sultan Makhdum Alaiddin Malik Mahmud Shah Johan Berdaulat (1023 – 1059)
10. Sultan Makhdum Alaiddin Malik Mansur Shah Johan Berdaulat (1059 – 1078)
11. Sultan Makhdum Alaiddin Malik Abdullah Shah Johan Berdaulat (1078 – 1109)
12. Sultan Makhdum Alaiddin Malik Ahmad Shah Johan Berdaulat (1109 – 1135)
13. Sultan Makhdum Alaiddin Malik Mahmud Shah Johan Berdaulat (1135 – 1160)
14. Sultan Makhdum Alaiddin Malik Usman Shah Johan Berdaulat (1160 – 1173)
15. Sultan Makhdum Alaiddin Malik Muhammad Shah Johan Berdaulat (1173 – 1200)
16. Sultan Makhdum Alaiddin Abdul Jalil Shah Johan Berdaulat (1200 – 1230)
17. Sultan Makhdum Alaiddin Malik Muhammad Amin Shah II Johan Berdaulat (1230 – 1267)
18. Sultan Makhdum Alaiddin Malik Abdul Aziz Johan Berdaulat (1267 – 1292)
