= Tunas Bangsa Stadium =

- Location in Aceh, Northern Sumatra, Sumatra and Indonesia Tunas Bangsa Stadium (Northern Sumatra) Tunas Bangsa Stadium (Sumatra) Tunas Bangsa Stadium (Indonesia)
- Location: Lhokseumawe, Aceh, Indonesia
- Coordinates: 5°10′27″N 97°08′16″E
- Owner: Government of Lhokseumawe City
- Operator: Government of Lhokseumawe City
- Capacity: 20,000

Construction
- Opened: 1996

Tenant
- PSLS Lhokseumawe

Tunas Bangsa Stadium is a multi-purpose stadium in Lhokseumawe, Indonesia. It is currently used mostly for football matches and is used as the home venue for PSLS Lhokseumawe of the Indonesian Premier League. This stadium holds 20,000 spectators and opened in 1996.

== See also ==
- List of stadiums in Indonesia
