= PSBL Langsa =

Indonesian football club

- Full name: Persatuan Sepak Bola Langsa
- Nickname: Elang Biru (Blue Eagles)
- Short name: PSBL
- Founded: 1966; 60 years ago
- Ground: Langsa Stadium; Langsa, Aceh
- Capacity: 6,000
- Owner: PT. PSBL Langsa
- Chairman: Said Mahdum
- Coach: Azhar
- League: Liga 4
- 2024–25: 4th, (Aceh zone)
Home colours	Away colours

Persatuan Sepak Bola Langsa, commonly known as PSBL Langsa, is an Indonesian football club based in Langsa, Aceh. They play in Liga 4. Their home ground is Langsa Stadium. In the 2021 Liga 3 Aceh season, PSBL Langsa came out as champions after defeating Galacticos Bireuen, this is their fourth title in the club's history. They got their first title in 1983 after winning the match against PSLS Lhokseumawe, the second title was when in 1993, they won the match 3–2 over PSAP Sigli, and the third title in 1999, they beat Persimura Mutiara.

== Squad ==
Note: Flags indicate national team as defined under FIFA eligibility rules; some limited exceptions apply. Players may hold more than one non-FIFA nationality.

No.	Pos.	Nation	Player
1	GK	IDN	Chairil Zulazhar
2	DF	IDN	Rizaldi
3	DF	IDN	Heriansyah
6	MF	IDN	Febry Ramadhansyah
7	MF	IDN	Yusrizal Muzzaki
8	MF	IDN	Fajrullah Leonardo
11	FW	IDN	Reza Rizky
12	GK	IDN	Puji Hasandi
15	DF	IDN	M. Nazar

No.	Pos.	Nation	Player
17	MF	IDN	Abdul Tommy
19	FW	IDN	M. Antoni
20	GK	IDN	Zulbahra
22	FW	IDN	Wahyu Firnanda
23	FW	IDN	Sandy Putra Wijaya
24	MF	IDN	Kiki Harissandi
25	MF	IDN	Riski Nursyahputra
26	DF	IDN	Mora Handika
93	FW	IDN	Saifuddin

== Season-by-season records ==
Season	League	Tier	Tms.	Pos.	Piala Indonesia
1998–99	Second Division	3		Promoted	–
1999–2000	First Division	2	21	4th, West group	–
2001	First Division	2	23	6th, West group	–
2002	First Division	2	27	4th, Group 4	–
2003	First Division	2	26	'5th, Group A	–
2004	First Division	2	24	'11th, West division	–
2005	First Division	2	27	Withdrew	–
2006	First Division	2	36	6th, Group I	First round
2007	First Division	2	40	7th, Group I	Round of 32
2008–09	First Division	3	48	First round	–
2009–10	First Division	3	60	4th, Group I	–
2010	First Division	3	57	Semi-final	–
2011–12	Premier Division (LPIS)	2	28	4th, Group 1	–
2013	Premier Division (LPIS)	2	21	3rd, Group 1	–
2014	Premier Division	2	63	5th, Group 1	–
2015	Premier Division	2	55	did not finish	–
2016	ISC B	2	53	4th, Group 1	–
2017	Liga 2	2	61	6th, Group 1	–
2018	Liga 3	3	32	3rd, First round	Round of 32
2019	Liga 3	3	32	3rd, First round	Round of 32
2020	Liga 3	3	season abandoned		–
2021–22	Liga 3	3	64	4th, Second round	–
2022–23	Liga 3	3	season abandoned		–
2023–24	Liga 3	3	80	5th, First round	–
2024–25	Liga 4	4	64	Eliminated in Provincial round	–

== Honours ==
- Liga 3 Aceh
  - Champions (2): 2021, 2023–24
  - Runner-up (1): 2019
