= PSAS Aceh Singkil =

Indonesian football club

PSAS
- Full name: Persatuan Sepakbola Aceh Singkil
- Nickname: Laskar Tanoh Batuah
- Ground: Kasim Tagok Stadium; Aceh Singkil, Aceh
- Owner: PSSI Aceh Singkil
- Chairman: Faisal
- Manager: Al Hidayat Bancin
- Coach: Mulya Saputra
- League: Liga 4
- 2021: Quarter-finals, (Aceh zone)
Home colours	Away colours

Persatuan Sepakbola Aceh Singkil (simply known as PSAS) is an Indonesian football club based in Aceh Singkil Regency, Aceh. They currently compete in the Liga 4.

== Honours ==
- Soeratin Cup U15 Aceh
  - Champion (1): 2023
