= PS Peureulak Raya =

Indonesian football club

- Full name: Persatuan Sepakbola Peureulak Raya
- Nicknames: Hamboe Laju; Laskar Bandar Khalifah (Bandar Khalifah Warriors)
- Short name: PSPR
- Founded: 2001; 25 years ago
- Ground: Cot Kulam Pasir Putih Football Field; Peureulak, East Aceh
- Capacity: 500
- Owner: PSSI East Aceh
- Manager: Fattah Fikri
- Coach: Wahyu Hidayat
- League: Liga 4
- 2024–25: 3rd (Aceh zone); Second round, 3rd in Group X (National phase)
Home colours	Away colours

Persatuan Sepakbola Peureulak Raya (simply known as PS Peureulak Raya) is an Indonesian football club based in Peureulak, East Aceh Regency, Aceh. They currently compete in the Liga 4.
