= Kuala Nanggroe F.C. =

Indonesian football club

Kuala Nanggroe
- Full name: Kuala Nanggroe Football Club
- Nicknames: The Red and White
- Short name: KNFC
- Founded: 2017; 9 years ago
- Ground: H. Dimurthala Stadium
- Capacity: 7,000
- Owner: Askot PSSI Banda Aceh
- Manager: Andi Safrial
- Coach: Azhari
- League: Liga 4
- 2024–25: 3rd, Second Round in Group E (Aceh zone)
Home colours	Away colours

Kuala Nanggroe Football Club (simply known as KNFC or Kuala Nanggroe FC) is an Indonesian football club based in Banda Aceh, Aceh. They currently compete in the Liga 4 and their homeground is H. Dimurthala Stadium.

== Honours ==
- Liga 3 Aceh
  - Champion (1): 2017
- Liga 4 Aceh
  - Fourth-place (1): 2025–26
