= H. Dimurthala Stadium =

Football stadium in Banda Aceh, Indonesia

- Location in Aceh Location in Indonesia
- Former names: Lampineung Stadium
- Address: Jl. Stadion H. Dimurthala, Kota Baru, Kuta Alam, Banda Aceh, Aceh; Indonesia
- Location: Banda Aceh, Aceh
- Coordinates: 5.565437°N 95.341260°E
- Owner: Banda Aceh Government
- Capacity: 7,000
- Surface: Grass pitch
- Field size: 100 m x 64 m

Construction
- Opened: 28 July 1957
- Renovated: 2018

Tenants
- Persiraja Banda Aceh; Kuala Nanggroe

H. Dimurthala Stadium (Indonesian: Stadion H. Dimurthala), previously known as Lampineung Stadium, is a football-specific stadium located in Banda Aceh, Aceh, Indonesia. The stadium holds 7,000 people and it is a homebase for the Championship club Persiraja Banda Aceh and the Liga 4 club Kuala Nanggroe.

== Facilities ==
Since the stadium is mainly used for football match, it does not have athletic track. It has dressing rooms, a secretariat room, and a press conference room. The single seats are only available for VIP at the west tribune. Since 2018, all tribunes have been roofed.

== Usages ==
It is currently used mostly for football matches. Besides that, it was also used for government employment test and as a venue for music concerts, such as: Peterpan and Maher Zain.
