= Tajura Aceh F.C. =

Association football club in Indonesia

Tajura Aceh FC
- Full name: Tajura Aceh Football Club
- Nickname: Laskar Cerana
- Short name: TAFC
- Founded: 2020; 6 years ago
- Ground: Putroe Aloh Stadium; Southwest Aceh, Aceh
- Owner: Askab PSSI Aceh Barat Daya
- Chairman: Wisman
- Manager: Saifullah SE
- Coach: Dodi Hardimas
- League: Liga 4
- 2024–25: Disqualified, (Aceh zone)
Home colours	Away colours

Tajura Aceh Football Club (simply known as Tajura Aceh FC) is an Indonesian football club based in Southwest Aceh Regency, Aceh. They currently compete in the Liga 4 and their homeground is Putroe Aloh Stadium.

== Honours ==
- Soeratin Cup Aceh U17
  - Champion: 2021
