= PSGL Gayo Lues =

Indonesian football club

- Full name: Persatuan Sepakbola Gayo Lues
- Nicknames: Harimau Leuser (Leuser Tigers)
- Founded: 20 April 2007; 18 years ago
- Ground: Seribu Bukit Stadium
- Capacity: 10,000
- Owner: PT. Gayo Lues Sportindo
- Chairman: Suhardi
- Coach: Zefrizal
- League: Liga 4
- 2021: Round of 16, Aceh zone
Home colours	Away colours

Persatuan Sepakbola Gayo Lues, commonly known as PSGL Gayo Lues, is an Indonesian football club based in Gayo Lues Regency, Aceh. They played in the 2011–12 Premier Division, the second-tier league in Indonesia. However, now they play in the lowest tier Indonesian league, Liga 4.

== Honours ==
- Liga 4 Aceh
  - Third-place (1): 2025–26
