= Yulianto =

Yulianto is an Indonesian name. Notable people with the name include:

- Alvent Yulianto (born 1980), Indonesian badminton player
- Charis Yulianto (born 1978), Indonesian footballer
- Hari Nur Yulianto (born 1989), Indonesian footballer
- Kurniawan Dwi Yulianto (born 1976), Indonesian footballer
