= Seribu Bukit Stadium =

- Location in Aceh, Northern Sumatra, Sumatra and Indonesia Seribu Bukit Stadium (Northern Sumatra) Seribu Bukit Stadium (Sumatra) Seribu Bukit Stadium (Indonesia)
- Address: Indonesia
- Location: Gayo Lues Regency, Aceh
- Coordinates: 4°00′15″N 97°20′22″E
- Owner: Government of Gayo Lues Regency
- Operator: Government of Gayo Lues Regency
- Capacity: 10,000
- Surface: Grass field

Tenant
- PSGL Gayo Lues

Seribu Bukit Stadium is home ground of Gayo Lues Regency football team, PSGL Gayo Lues.
