= Aceh Utara F.C. =

Indonesian football club

Aceh Utara
- Full name: Aceh Utara Football Club
- Nicknames: Harimau Lhoksukon (Lhoksukon Tigers)
- Founded: 2000; 26 years ago, as Persikaba North Aceh; 2007; 19 years ago, as Aceh Utara FC
- Ground: PT Pupuk Iskandar Muda Stadium; North Aceh Regency, Aceh
- Capacity: 2,000
- Owner: PSSI North Aceh
- Chairman: H. Anwar Sanusi
- Coach: Ikhsan Nur Rizki Zulkifli
- League: Liga 4
- 2021: Liga 3, 3rd in Group C (Aceh zone)
Home colours	Away colours

Aceh Utara Football Club (formerly known as Persikaba North Aceh) is an Indonesian football club based in North Aceh Regency, Aceh. They currently compete in Liga 4 Aceh zone.

== History ==
Founded in 2000 as the Persatuan Sepakbola Indonesia Kabupaten Aceh Utara (Persikaba). They then decided to change their name to Aceh Utara Football Club in 2007 through the agreement of local clubs in the PSSI North Aceh.
