= Idi Rayeuk =

District in East Aceh Regency, Aceh Province, Indonesia

Coordinates: 4°56′N 97°47′E

Idi Rayeuk (Acehnese pronunciation: [i.di ra.jɯk̚]) is a town in Aceh province of Indonesia and the capital of East Aceh Regency.

== Climate ==
Idi Rayeuk has a tropical rainforest climate (Af) with moderate rainfall from February to August and heavy rainfall from September to January.

Climate data for Idi Rayeuk
Month	Jan	Feb	Mar	Apr	May	Jun	Jul	Aug	Sep	Oct	Nov	Dec	Year
Mean daily maximum °C (°F)	31.0 (87.8)	32.0 (89.6)	32.5 (90.5)	32.7 (90.9)	32.2 (90.0)	32.1 (89.8)	31.8 (89.2)	31.8 (89.2)	31.1 (88.0)	31.2 (88.2)	30.7 (87.3)	30.6 (87.1)	31.6 (89.0)
Daily mean °C (°F)	26.7 (80.1)	27.2 (81.0)	27.6 (81.7)	28.0 (82.4)	27.8 (82.0)	27.6 (81.7)	27.2 (81.0)	27.3 (81.1)	27.0 (80.6)	27.2 (81.0)	26.8 (80.2)	26.6 (79.9)	27.3 (81.1)
Mean daily minimum °C (°F)	22.5 (72.5)	22.4 (72.3)	22.7 (72.9)	23.3 (73.9)	23.4 (74.1)	23.1 (73.6)	22.6 (72.7)	22.8 (73.0)	22.9 (73.2)	23.2 (73.8)	22.9 (73.2)	22.7 (72.9)	22.9 (73.2)
Average rainfall mm (inches)	209 (8.2)	86 (3.4)	69 (2.7)	82 (3.2)	136 (5.4)	105 (4.1)	110 (4.3)	141 (5.6)	179 (7.0)	206 (8.1)	234 (9.2)	306 (12.0)	1,863 (73.2)
Source: Climate-Data.org
