= Liga 4 Aceh =

Fourth tier in Indonesian football league system

- Founded: 2017; 9 years ago, as Liga 3 Aceh; 2024; 2 years ago, as Liga 4 Aceh
- Country: Indonesia
- Confederation: AFC
- Level on pyramid: 3 (2017–2024); 4 (2024–)
- Promotion to: Liga 4 national phase
- Domestic cup: Piala Indonesia
- Current champions: PSAP Sigli (2025–26)
- Most championships: Persidi Idi Rayeuk; PSBL Langsa (2 titles)
- Broadcaster(s): YouTube
- Current: 2026–27

Liga 4 Aceh (previously known as Liga 3 Aceh) is a fourth level Indonesian football competition held by Provincial Association (Asprov) of PSSI Aceh since 2017. It is also a qualification to qualify for the Liga 4 national phase.

Persidi Idi Rayeuk and PSBL Langsa became the most successful teams (2 titles each).

== Championship history ==
Season	Teams	Champion(s)	Score	Runner-up	Ref.
Liga 3 Aceh
2017	25	Kuala Nanggroe	1–0	Aceh United	
2018	Not held				
2019	22	Persidi	round-robin	PSBL	
2020	Cancelled due to COVID-19 pandemic				
2021	27	PSBL	2–2 (5–4 p)	Galacticos	
2023–24	25	PSBL	2–2 (4–2 p)	PSAB	
Liga 4 Aceh
2024–25	12	Persidi	1–1 (5–4 p)	PSAB	
2025–26	17	PSAP	2–0	Al-Farlaky	
2026–27					
