= PS Siak =

Indonesian football club

- Full name: Persatuan Sepakbola Siak
- Nicknames: Naga Berjuang; Laskar Ghimbam (Ghimbam Warriors)
- Short name: PS Siak
- Founded: 2001; 25 years ago
- Ground: Kampung Rempak Stadium; Siak, Riau
- Capacity: 30,000
- Owner: PT. Siak Palace Sport
- Chairman: Iirving Kahar
- Manager: Syahrial Efendy
- League: Liga 4
- 2023: 1st, Champions (Riau zone)
Home colours	Away colours

Persatuan Sepakbola Siak (simply known as PS Siak) is an Indonesian football club based in Siak Sri Indrapura, Siak, Riau. They compete in Liga 4.

== Honours ==
- Liga 3 Riau
  - Champions (2): 2021, 2023
  - Runner-up (1): 2019
