= PSAP Sigli =

Indonesian football club

- Full name: Persatuan Sepakbola Aceh Pidie Sigli
- Nicknames: Laskar Aneuk Nanggroe; Harimau Sumatra
- Short name: PSAP
- Founded: 1970; 56 years ago
- Ground: Kuta Asan Stadium
- Capacity: 10,000
- Owner: Pidie Regency Government
- Manager: Nazaruddin Usman
- Coach: Safrizani
- League: Liga 4
- 2023: 3rd, Group H (Aceh zone)
Home colours	Away colours

Persatuan Sepakbola Aceh Pidie Sigli, commonly known as PSAP Sigli, is an Indonesian football club based in Pidie Regency, Aceh. They play in Liga 4. Their best achievement was to play in Indonesia Super League in 2011–12 season. Their home venues is Kuta Asan Stadium and Blang Paseh Stadium, which is located in downtown Sigli.

== Season-by-season records ==
Season	League/Division	Tms.	Pos.	Piala Indonesia
2002	Second Division		Second round	–
2003	Second Division	28	4th, First round	–
2004	Second Division	41	Eliminated in provincial round	–
2005	Second Division			–
2006	Second Division	47	3rd, Third round	–
2007–08	First Division	40	2nd, Group 1	Round of 16
2008–09	Premier Division	29	11th, Group 1	First round
2009–10	Premier Division	33	5th, Group 1	–
2010–11	Premier Division	39	3rd, Second round	–
2011–12	Indonesia Super League	18	18	–
2013	Premier Division	38	3rd, Group 1	–
2014	Premier Division	63	8th, Group 1	–
2015	Liga Nusantara	season abandoned		–
2016	ISC Liga Nusantara	32		–
2017	Liga 3	32	Eliminated in provincial round	–
2018				
2019	Liga 3	32	Eliminated in provincial round	–
2020	Liga 3	season abandoned		–
2021–22	Liga 3	64	Eliminated in provincial round	–
2022–23	Liga 3	season abandoned		–
2023–24	Liga 3	64	Eliminated in provincial round	–
2024–25				

== Honours ==
- Liga 4 Aceh
  - Champion (1): 2025–26
