= Persal South Aceh =

Indonesian football club

- Full name: Persatuan Sepakbola Aceh Selatan
- Nickname: Laskar Teuku Cut Ali
- Founded: 1956; 70 years ago
- Ground: Ludung Mekong Stadium; South Aceh, Aceh
- Capacity: 3,000
- Owner: Askab PSSI Aceh Selatan
- Chairman: Arjuna
- Coach: Fatayuddin
- League: Liga 4
- 2024–25: 4th, Second Round in Group E (Aceh zone)
Home colours	Away colours

Persatuan Sepakbola Aceh Selatan (simply known as Persal) is an Indonesian football club based in South Aceh, Aceh. They currently played in Liga 4 Aceh zone.
