= Persimura Beureunuen =

Association football club in Indonesia

- Full name: Persatuan Sepakbola Indonesia Mutiara Beureunuen
- Nickname: Laskar Rencong Emas
- Founded: 1989; 37 years ago
- Ground: Mutiara Stadium; Pidie, Aceh
- Owner: PSSI Pidie Regency
- Chairman: T. Saifullah
- Manager: Muzakir SH
- Coach: Bustami
- League: Liga 4
- 2023: 5th in Group A, (Aceh zone)
Home colours	Away colours

Persatuan Sepakbola Indonesia Mutiara Beureunuen, commonly known as Persimura Beureunuen, is an Indonesian football club based in Beureunuen, Mutiara District, Pidie Regency, Aceh. They currently compete in the Liga 4 Aceh zone.
