= Persidi Idi Rayeuk =

Indonesian football club

Persidi
- Full name: Persatuan Sepakbola Idi Rayeuk
- Nicknames: Hamok Laju (Quick Strike); Laskar Mon Sikureung (Mon Sikureung Warriors)
- Short name: Persidi
- Founded: 1980; 46 years ago
- Ground: Mon Sikureueng Stadium; Idi Rayeuk, Aceh Timur
- Capacity: 2,000
- Owner: PSSI East Aceh
- Chairman: Iswandi
- Manager: Nofrizal
- Coach: Ridwan Salam
- League: Liga 4
- 2024–25: 1st, (Aceh zone); First round, 4th in Group G (National phase)
Home colours	Away colours	Third colours

Persatuan Sepakbola Idi Rayeuk, commonly known as Persidi, is an Indonesian football club based in Idi Rayeuk, East Aceh Regency, Aceh. They currently compete in Liga 4 Aceh zone.

== Honours ==
- Liga 3 Aceh
  - Champion (1): 2019
- Liga 4 Aceh
  - Champion (1): 2024–25
