= Persas Sabang =

Indonesian football club

Persas
- Full name: Persatuan Sepakbola Sabang dan Sekitarnya
- Nickname: Laskar Aulia 44
- Ground: Gelora Sabang-Merauke Stadium
- Capacity: 6,000
- Owner: PT. Bhakti Megatama Sabang
- Chairman: Izil Azhar
- Manager: Hj. Isa
- Coach: Samani
- League: Liga 4
- 2024–25: 3rd, First Round in third-placed (Aceh zone)
| Home colours | Away colours |

Persatuan Sepakbola Sabang dan Sekitarnya (simply known as Persas) is an Indonesian football club based in Sabang, Aceh. They currently compete in Liga 4 Aceh zone.
