= PSAB Aceh Besar =

Indonesian football club

- Full name: Persatuan Sepakbola Aceh Besar
- Nickname: Laskar Seulawah (Seulawah Warriors)
- Short name: PSAB
- Ground: Jantho Stadium
- Capacity: 5,000
- Owner: PSSI Aceh Besar
- Chairman: Mariadi
- Manager: Al Yunirun
- Coach: Septi Heriansyah
- League: Liga 4
- 2024–25 Liga 4: 2nd (Aceh zone); First round, 4th in Group L (National phase)
Home colours	Away colours	Third colours

Persatuan Sepakbola Aceh Besar, commonly known as PSAB, is an Indonesian football club based in Jantho, Aceh Besar Regency, Aceh. They currently compete in Liga 4 Aceh zone.

== Honours ==
- Liga 3 Aceh
  - Runner-up (1): 2023–24
- Liga 4 Aceh
  - Runner-up (1): 2024–25
