= PSLS Lhokseumawe =

Indonesian football club

PSLS
- Full name: Persatuan Sepakbola Lhokseumawe Sekitar
- Nicknames: Laskar Pasai (Pase Warriors); Harimau Malaka (The Malacca Tiger)
- Short name: PSLS
- Founded: 1962; 64 years ago
- Ground: Tunas Bangsa Stadium; Lhokseumawe, Aceh
- Capacity: 20,000
- Owner: Lhokseumawe Government
- Chairman: Abdul Rahman Biro
- Manager: Mahlil
- Coach: Mukhlis Rasyid
- League: Liga 4
- 2024–25: 3rd, Second Round in Group F (Aceh zone)
Home colours	Away colours

Persatuan Sepakbola Lhokseumawe Sekitar (simply known as a PSLS) is an Indonesian football club based in Lhokseumawe, Aceh. They currently compete in the Liga 4.

== Nicknames ==
- Pasai Warrior

Since the first Lhokseumawe is from Samudera Pasai Sultanate dominate Strait of Malacca and has great strength. Because of this PSLS Lhokseumawe given the nickname Pasai Warriors.

- The Malacca Tiger

Since Samudera Pasai Sultanate dominate Strait of Malacca so strong that in dubbed "Tiger of Malacca". Therefore, PSLS also nicknamed The Malacca Tiger, in order to be a strong club in Aceh, also in Indonesian football.

== Supporter ==
Paseemania are loyal supporters of the club PSLS Lhokseumawe.
