= East Aceh Regency =

Regency in Aceh, Indonesia

East Aceh Regency Kabupaten Aceh Timur
- Regency
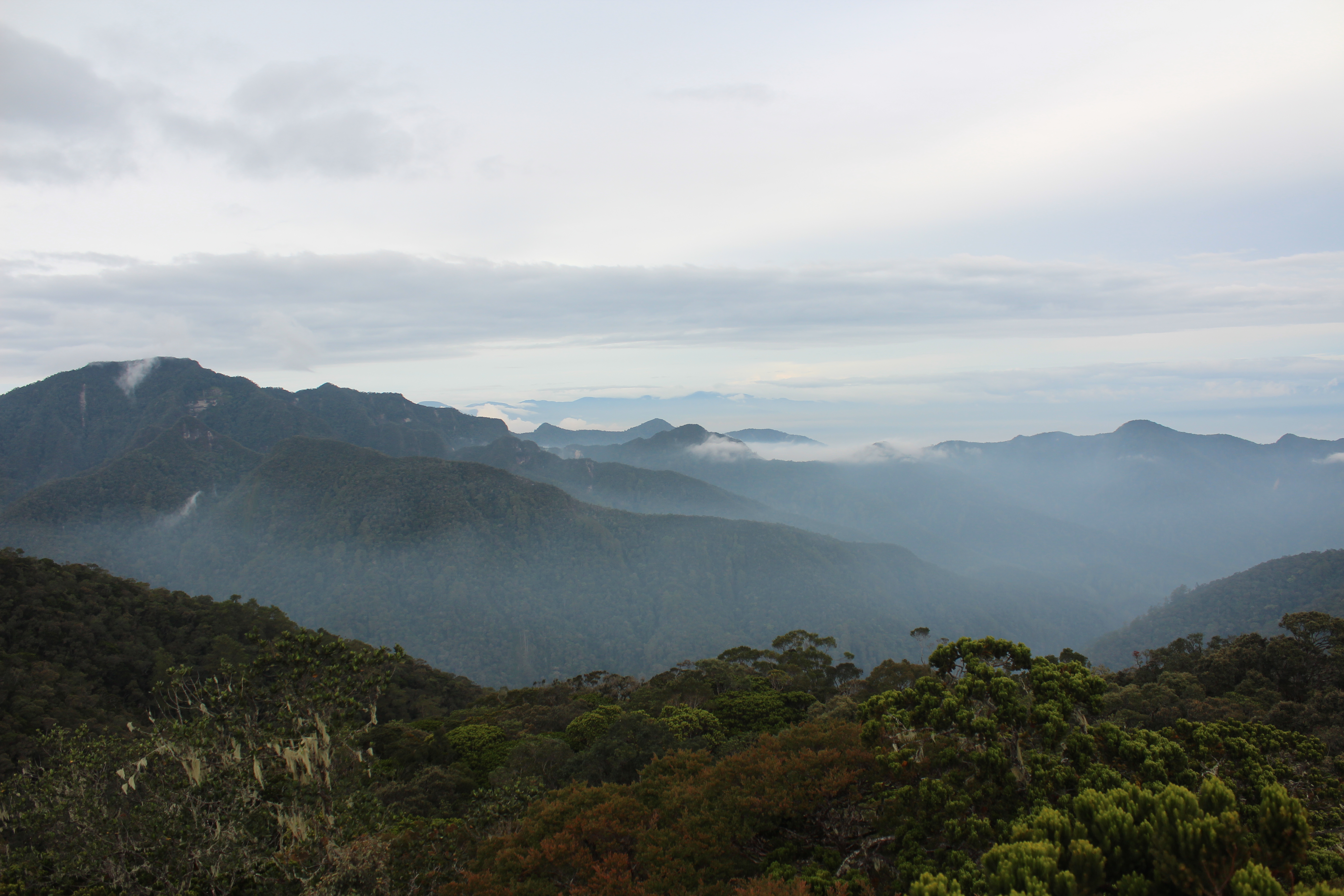
- Mugajah mountain range

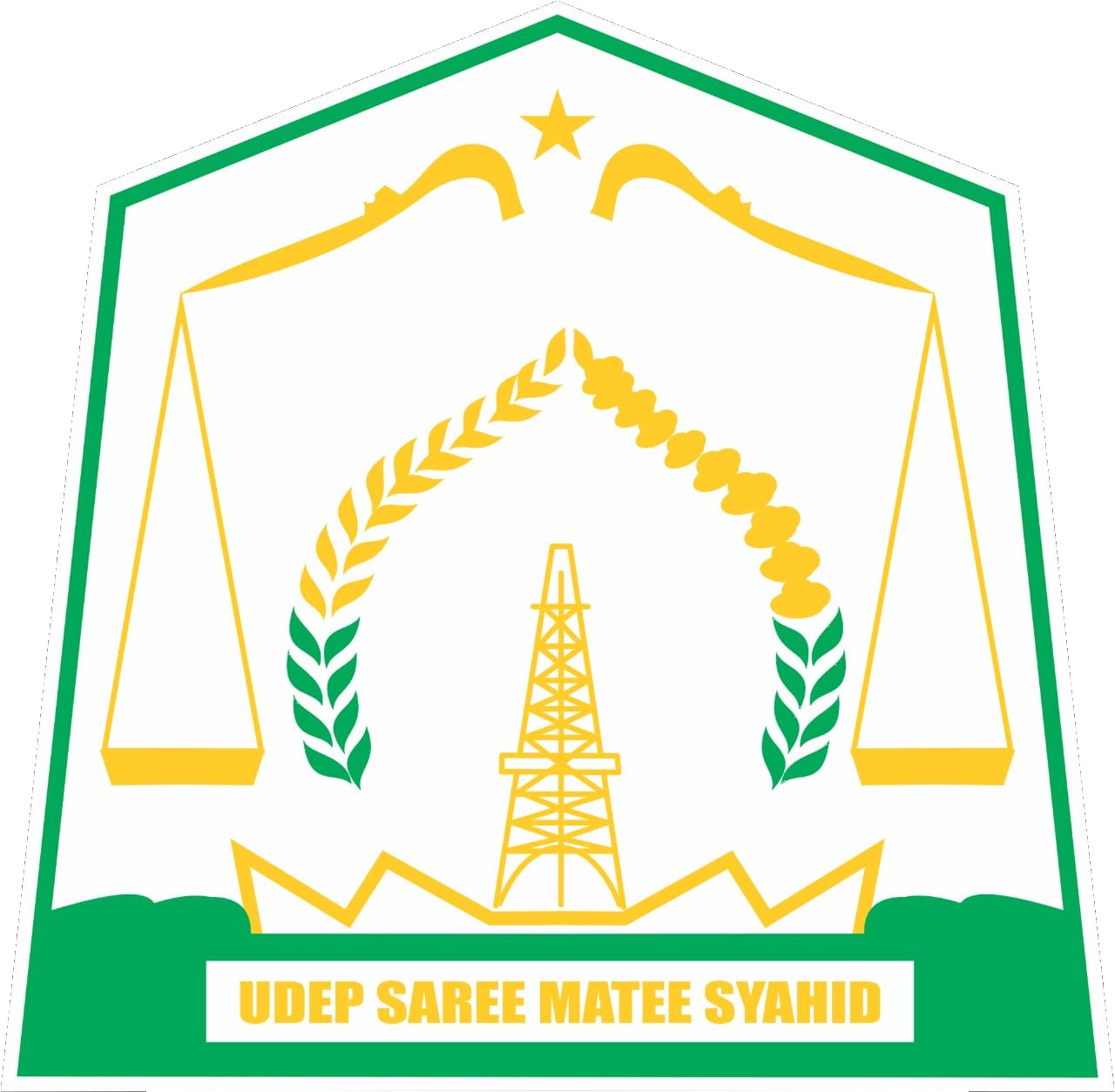
- Seal
- Motto: Udep Saree Matee Syahid (Honorable Life and so Martyrdom)
- Location within Aceh

- Location in Aceh, Northern Sumatra, Sumatra and Indonesia East Aceh Regency (Northern Sumatra) East Aceh Regency (Sumatra) East Aceh Regency (Indonesia)
- Coordinates: 4°37′N 97°37′E
- Country: Indonesia
- Region: Sumatra
- Province: Aceh
- Established: 1956
- Regency seat: Idi Rayeuk

Government
  - Regent: Iskandar Usman Al-Farlaky
  - Vice Regent: Zainal Abidin

Area
  - Total: 6,040.6 km^{2} (2,332.3 sq mi)

Population (mid 2025 estimate)
  - Total: 472,102
  - Density: 78.155/km^{2} (202.42/sq mi)
- Time zone: UTC+7 (IWST)
- Area code: (+62) 646
- Website: acehtimurkab.go.id

East Aceh Regency (Indonesian: Kabupaten Aceh Timur) is a regency in eastern Aceh province of Indonesia. It is located on the island of Sumatra. The regency covers an area of 6,040.6 square kilometres and had a population of 360,475 at the 2010 Census and 422,401 at the 2020 Census; the official estimate as of mid 2025 was 472,102 (comprising 237,710 males and 234,392 females). The regency capital is the town of Idi Rayeuk, in the district of the same name.

The regency borders the Malacca Strait to the north-east, the city of Langsa and Aceh Tamiang Regency to the south-east, Gayo Lues Regency to the south, and Central Aceh Regency, Bener Meriah Regency and North Aceh Regency to the west.

== Economy ==
This regency is rich in petroleum, more so than the North Aceh and Aceh Tamiang regencies. Fishing employs many people in the regency but little of it is exported; people depend on it for food. The main fishing centre in the regency is in Idl. The regency also has several food-plant based industries producing tofu, tempeh and sun-dried banana chips. Some areas are under plantation exploitation for palm oil and rubber, although there is only one state-owned company (TPN I) operating in the area. Plantations also produce cacao and chocolate and in the Lokop area iron ore and lead is mined.

== Administrative districts ==
The regency is divided administratively into twenty-four districts (kecamatan), listed below with their areas and their populations at the 2010 Census and 2020 Census; together with the official estimates as of mid 2025. The table also includes the locations of the district administrative centres, the number of villages (gampong) in each district, and its postal code.

| Kode Wilayah | Name of District (kecamatan) | Area in km^{2} | Pop'n Census 2010 | Pop'n Census 2020 | Pop'n Estimate mid 2025 | Admin centre | No. of villages | Post code |
|---|---|---|---|---|---|---|---|---|
| 11.03.05 | Serbajadi | 2,165.66 | 5,766 | 6,701 | 8,177 | Lokop | 17 | 24460 |
| 11.03.20 | Simpang Jernih | 544.63 | 3,397 | 3,626 | 4,027 | Simpang Jernih | 8 | 24464 |
| 11.03.24 | Peunaron | 79.74 | 8,206 | 9,154 | 9,876 | Arul Pinang | 5 | 24461 |
| 11.03.04 | Birem Bayeun | 253.68 | 25,330 | 28,710 | 30,334 | Birem Bayeun | 27 | 24452 |
| 11.03.08 | Rantau Selamat | 159.80 | 11,223 | 12,372 | 13,855 | Bayeun | 14 | 24451 |
| 11.03.19 | Sungai Raya | 159.00 | 10,672 | 12,672 | 14,141 | Labuhan Keude | 13 | 24466 |
| 11.03.07 | Peureulak | 318.02 | 39,691 | 46,245 | 51,695 | Peureulak | 38 | 24453 |
| 11.03.17 | Peureulak Timur (East Peureulak) | 182.70 | 12,601 | 14,457 | 16,053 | Alue Tho | 20 | 24440 |
| 11.03.18 | Peureulak Barat (West Peureulak) | 92.30 | 13,633 | 17,367 | 19,639 | Beusa Seubrang | 15 | 24450 |
| 11.03.10 | Ranto Peureulak | 129.00 | 21,945 | 25,945 | 30,081 | Ranto Peureulak | 23 | 24441 |
| 11.03.03 | Idi Rayeuk | 79.60 | 33,136 | 39,086 | 43,025 | Idi Rayeuk | 35 | 24442 |
| 11.03.16 | Peudawa | 75.90 | 10,274 | 12,958 | 14,653 | Seuneubok Peudawa | 17 | 24469 |
| 11.03.15 | Banda Alam | 90.95 | 7,296 | 8,651 | 9,915 | Pantai Rayeuk M. | 16 | 24458 |
| 11.03.14 | Idi Tunong | 74.70 | 8,895 | 11,305 | 13,061 | Buket Teukuh | 25 | 24443 |
| 11.03.21 | Darul Ihsan | 54.50 | 5,447 | 7,343 | 8,428 | Keude Dua | 16 | 24468 |
| 11.03.23 | Idi Timur (East Idi) | 55.15 | 5,210 | 6,762 | 8,082 | Keude Redep | 13 | 24456 |
| 11.03.01 | Darul Aman | 131.50 | 17,043 | 20,569 | 23,896 | Idi Cut | 45 | 24455 |
| 11.03.06 | Nurussalam | 137.07 | 15,308 | 17,843 | 19,860 | Bagok | 31 | 24467 |
| 11.03.22 | Darul Falah | 42.40 | 2,902 | 3,752 | 4,184 | Tunung Ulee Gajah | 11 | 24454 |
| 11.03.02 | Julok | 234.36 | 23,884 | 26,835 | 29,640 | Kuta Binjei | 37 | 24459 |
| 11.03.13 | Indra Makmur | 89.05 | 15,772 | 16,416 | 17,243 | Alue le Mirah | 13 | 24457 |
| 11.03.11 | Pante Bidari (or Pante Beudari) | 233.25 | 21,490 | 25,588 | 28,725 | Lhok Nibong | 25 | 24463 |
| 11.03.09 | Simpang Ulim | 123.80 | 18,136 | 21,136 | 23,480 | Simpang Ulim | 23 | 24465 |
| 11.03.12 | Madat | 200.84 | 23,218 | 26,908 | 30,032 | Madat | 26 | 24462 |
| | Totals | 6,040.60 | 360,475 | 422,401 | 472,102 | Idi Rayeuk | 513 | |
