= 2024–25 Liga 4 North Sumatra =

Liga 4 North Sumatra
- Season: 2024–25
- Dates: 13 February – 7 April 2025
- Champions: Victory Dairi (1st title)
- National phase: Victory Dairi; PS Kwarta
- Matches: 39
- Goals: 161 (4.13 per match)
- Biggest win: PS Sergai 14–1 Agtagana (19 February 2025)
- Highest scoring: PS Sergai 14–1 Agtagana (19 February 2025)

The 2024–25 Liga 4 North Sumatra was the inaugural season of Liga 4 North Sumatra after the change in the structure of Indonesian football competition and serves as a qualifying round for the national phase of the 2024–25 Liga 4. The competition is organised by the North Sumatra Provincial PSSI Association.

== Teams ==
=== Participating teams ===
A total of 15 teams are competing in this season.

No	Team	Location	2023–24 season
1	PSSA	Asahan Regency	—
2	Batubara United	Batubara Regency	—
3	Victory Dairi	Dairi Regency	—
4	PS Paya Bakung United	Deli Serdang Regency	Third place
5	PS Kwarta	Deli Serdang Regency	Second round (3rd in Group E)
6	Ratu	Deli Serdang Regency	Second round (4th in Group E)
7	Gunungsitoli Khoda	Gunungsitoli City	—
8	Batak United	Medan City	First round (3rd in Group A)
9	Gumarang	Medan City	Fourth place
10	Pelita Medan Soccer	Medan City	First round (3rd in Group C)
11	PS TGM Medan	Medan City	Second round (3rd in Group F)
12	Agtagana	Serdang Bedagai Regency	—
13	PS Sergai	Serdang Bedagai Regency	—
14	PS Satria Muda	Serdang Bedagai Regency	—
15	Tanjungbalai United	Tanjungbalai City	—

=== Personnel and kits ===
Note: Flags indicate national team as has been defined under FIFA eligibility rules. Players and coaches may hold more than one non-FIFA nationality.

Team	Head coach	Captain	Kit manufacturer	Main kit sponsor	Other kit sponsor(s)
PSSA		(Indonesia) Enlarefo	(Indonesia) Ways	Laskar Naga Berkisar	List: Front: None; Back: None; Sleeves: None; Shorts: None
Batubara United			(Indonesia) Mills	None	List: Front: Back: Sleeves: Shorts:
Victory Dairi	(Indonesia) Eben Siregar	(Indonesia) Sanzai Hutajulu	(Indonesia) 7igan	Toko Emas S. Tarigan G.	List: Front: PT PAS, Parda; Back: Sleeves: Shorts:
PS Paya Bakung United				KM Kayari	List: Front: Saelam Group; Back: Sleeves: Shorts:
PS Kwarta			(Indonesia) NAM Apparel	None (first and second rounds) / Indo Bintang Electric (knockout round)	List: Front: None; Back: WWJD Sport; Sleeves: None; Shorts: None
Ratu			(Indonesia) N7 Apparel	LIRA	List: Front: Back: Sleeves: Shorts:
Gunungsitoli Khoda		(Indonesia) Ferisman	(Indonesia) Made by club (H) (Indonesia) Mounte (A)	TH	List: Front: TAG, GS NET; Back: None; Sleeves: None; Shorts: None
Batak United			(Indonesia) Made by club	Adam Depok (H) / BNN (A)	List: Front: Back: Sleeves: Shorts:
Gumarang			(Indonesia) Made by club	Kagaya Sport	List: Front: Bolahita; Back: None; Sleeves: None; Shorts: None
Pelita Medan Soccer				Investree	List: Front: Back: Sleeves: Shorts:
PS TGM Medan	(Indonesia) Herianto		(Indonesia) HS	None	List: Front: None; Back: None; Sleeves: None; Shorts: None
Agtagana			(Indonesia) Made by club	None	List: Front: None; Back: None; Sleeves: None; Shorts: None
PS Sergai			(Germany) Adidas (fake)	Dinas PUTR Serdang Bedagai	List: Front: Back: Sleeves: Shorts:
PS Satria Muda			(Indonesia) Made by club	Indako Honda	List: Front: AR Ponsel; Back: None; Sleeves: None; Shorts: None
Tanjungbalai United			(Indonesia) 7igan	Askot	List: Front: None; Back: None; Sleeves: None; Shorts: Babah Coffee and Kitchen

== Schedule ==
The schedule of the competition is as follows.

Round	Matchday	Date
First round	Matchday 1	13 February 2025
First round	Matchday 2	15 February 2025
First round	Matchday 3	17 February 2025
First round	Matchday 4	19 February 2025
First round	Matchday 5	21 February 2025
Second round	Matchday 1	23 February 2025
Second round	Matchday 2	25 February 2025
Second round	Matchday 3	27 February 2025
Knockout round	Semi-finals	5 April 2025
Knockout round	Third place play-off	7 April 2025
Knockout round	Final	7 April 2025

== First round ==
The 15 teams will be drawn into 3 groups. The first round will be played in a home tournament format of single round-robin matches.

The top two teams of each group will qualify for the second round.

=== Group A ===
All matches will be held at Mutiara Kisaran Stadium and Tanah Raja 3 Sidodadi Stadium, Asahan.

Pos	Team	Pld	W	D	L	GF	GA	GD	Pts	Qualification	PSA	VDR	GMR	RTU	PBU
1	PSSA	4	3	0	1	9	4	+5	9 (Note: Ranked on head-to-head points: PSSA 3, Victory Dairi 0.)	Qualification to the Second round	—	1–0	—	2–0	—
2	Victory Dairi	4	3	0	1	7	5	+2	9	Qualification to the Second round	—	—	2–1	—	4–2
3	Gumarang	4	2	0	2	4	6	−2	6		1–4	—	—	—	1–0
4	Ratu	4	1	0	3	2	5	−3	3 (Note: Ranked on head-to-head points: Ratu 3, Paya Bakung United 0.)		—	0–1	0–1	—	—
5	PS Paya Bakung United	4	1	0	3	6	8	−2	3		3–2	—	—	1–2	—

Source: Liga 4 North Sumatra
Rules for classification: 1) Points; 2) Head-to-head points; 3) Head-to-head goal difference; 4) Head-to-head goals scored; 5) Goal difference; 6) Goals scored; 7) Fair-play points; 8) Draw.
Notes:

Group A Matches

Matchday 1 (13 February 2025)
13 February 2025
13:30 WIB (UTC+7)

Gumarang	1–0	PS Paya Bakung United

Mutiara Kisaran Stadium, Asahan
13 February 2025
16:00 WIB (UTC+7)

PSSA	2–0	Ratu

Mutiara Kisaran Stadium, Asahan

Matchday 2 (15 February 2025)
15 February 2025
13:30 WIB (UTC+7)

Victory Dairi	2–1	Gumarang
	Report

Mutiara Kisaran Stadium, Asahan
15 February 2025
16:00 WIB (UTC+7)

PS Paya Bakung United	3–2	PSSA
	Report

Mutiara Kisaran Stadium, Asahan

Matchday 3 (17 February 2025)
17 February 2025
13:30 WIB (UTC+7)

PS Paya Bakung United	1–2	Ratu
	Report

Mutiara Kisaran Stadium, Asahan
17 February 2025
16:00 WIB (UTC+7)

PSSA	1–0	Victory Dairi
	Report

Mutiara Kisaran Stadium, Asahan

Matchday 4 (19 February 2025)
19 February 2025
13:30 WIB (UTC+7)

Victory Dairi	4–2	PS Paya Bakung United
	Report

Mutiara Kisaran Stadium, Asahan
19 February 2025
16:00 WIB (UTC+7)

Ratu	0–1	Gumarang
	Report

Mutiara Kisaran Stadium, Asahan

Matchday 5 (21 February 2025)
21 February 2025
16:00 WIB (UTC+7)

Ratu	0–1	Victory Dairi
	Report

Tanah Raja 3 Sidodadi Stadium, Asahan
21 February 2025
16:00 WIB (UTC+7)

Gumarang	1–4	PSSA
	Report

Mutiara Kisaran Stadium, Asahan

=== Group B ===
All matches will be held at Mini Pancing Stadium and TD Pardede Stadium, Deli Serdang.

Pos	Team	Pld	W	D	L	GF	GA	GD	Pts	Qualification	KWA	BTU	SMD	PMD	GSK
1	PS Kwarta	4	3	0	1	12	6	+6	9	Qualification to the Second round	—	—	2–1	—	6–1
2	Batak United	4	2	2	0	12	9	+3	8	Qualification to the Second round	2–1	—	—	4–4	—
3	PS Satria Muda	4	2	0	2	14	9	+5	6		—	3–5	—	—	6–0
4	Pelita Medan Soccer	4	1	1	2	14	11	+3	4		2–3	—	2–4	—	—
5	Gunungsitoli Khoda	4	0	1	3	2	19	−17	1		—	1–1	—	0–6	—

Source: Liga 4 North Sumatra
Rules for classification: 1) Points; 2) Head-to-head points; 3) Head-to-head goal difference; 4) Head-to-head goals scored; 5) Goal difference; 6) Goals scored; 7) Fair-play points; 8) Draw

Group B Matches

Matchday 1 (13 February 2025)
13 February 2025
13:30 WIB (UTC+7)

Pelita Medan Soccer	2–3	PS Kwarta

Mini Pancing Stadium, Deli Serdang
13 February 2025
16:00 WIB (UTC+7)

PS Satria Muda	6–0	Gunungsitoli Khoda

Mini Pancing Stadium, Deli Serdang

Matchday 2 (15 February 2025)
15 February 2025
13:30 WIB (UTC+7)

PS Satria Muda	3–5	Batak United
	Report

Mini Pancing Stadium, Deli Serdang
15 February 2025
16:00 WIB (UTC+7)

PS Kwarta	6–1	Gunungsitoli Khoda
	Report

Mini Pancing Stadium, Deli Serdang

Matchday 3 (17 February 2025)
17 February 2025
13:30 WIB (UTC+7)

Gunungsitoli Khoda	0–6	Pelita Medan Soccer
	Report

Mini Pancing Stadium, Deli Serdang
17 February 2025
16:00 WIB (UTC+7)

Batak United	2–1	PS Kwarta
	Report

Mini Pancing Stadium, Deli Serdang

Matchday 4 (19 February 2025)
19 February 2025
13:30 WIB (UTC+7)

Gunungsitoli Khoda	1–1	Batak United
	Report

Mini Pancing Stadium, Deli Serdang
19 February 2025
16:00 WIB (UTC+7)

Pelita Medan Soccer	2–4	PS Satria Muda
	Report

Mini Pancing Stadium, Deli Serdang

Matchday 5 (21 February 2025)
21 February 2025
13:45 WIB (UTC+7)

PS Kwarta	2–1	PS Satria Muda
	Report

Mini Pancing Stadium, Deli Serdang
21 February 2025
13:45 WIB (UTC+7)

Batak United	4–4	Pelita Medan Soccer
	Report

TD Pardede Stadium, Deli Serdang

=== Group C ===
All matches will be held at TD Pardede Stadium and Mini Pancing Stadium, Deli Serdang.

Pos	Team	Pld	W	D	L	GF	GA	GD	Pts	Qualification	SGI	TBL	BBU	TGM	ATG
1	PS Sergai	4	3	0	1	20	3	+17	9	Qualification to the Second round	—	2–1	—	—	14–1
2	Tanjungbalai United	4	2	1	1	10	4	+6	7	Qualification to the Second round	—	—	—	1–1	5–0
3	Batubara United	4	2	0	2	6	6	0	6		1–0	1–3	—	4–0	—
4	PS TGM Medan	4	1	1	2	10	9	+1	4		0–4	—	—	—	—
5	Agtagana	4	1	0	3	4	28	−24	3		—	—	3–0 (Note: The match was awarded as a 3–0 victory to Agtagana, after Batubara United did not send their team for the match.)	0–9	—

Source: Liga 4 North Sumatra
Rules for classification: 1) Points; 2) Head-to-head points; 3) Head-to-head goal difference; 4) Head-to-head goals scored; 5) Goal difference; 6) Goals scored; 7) Fair-play points; 8) Draw
Notes:

Group C Matches

Matchday 1 (13 February 2025)
13 February 2025
13:30 WIB (UTC+7)

Tanjungbalai United	5–0	Agtagana

TD Pardede Stadium, Deli Serdang
13 February 2025
16:00 WIB (UTC+7)

Batubara United	4–0	PS TGM Medan

TD Pardede Stadium, Deli Serdang

Matchday 2 (15 February 2025)
15 February 2025
13:30 WIB (UTC+7)

Agtagana	0–9	PS TGM Medan
	Report

TD Pardede Stadium, Deli Serdang
15 February 2025
16:00 WIB (UTC+7)

PS Sergai	2–1	Tanjungbalai United
	Report

TD Pardede Stadium, Deli Serdang

Matchday 3 (17 February 2025)
17 February 2025
13:30 WIB (UTC+7)

Batubara United	1–0	PS Sergai
	Report

TD Pardede Stadium, Deli Serdang
17 February 2025
16:00 WIB (UTC+7)

Tanjungbalai United	1–1	PS TGM Medan
	Report

TD Pardede Stadium, Deli Serdang

Matchday 4 (19 February 2025)
19 February 2025
13:30 WIB (UTC+7)

Batubara United	1–3	Tanjungbalai United
	Report

TD Pardede Stadium, Deli Serdang
19 February 2025
16:00 WIB (UTC+7)

PS Sergai	14–1	Agtagana
	Report

TD Pardede Stadium, Deli Serdang

Matchday 5 (21 February 2025)
21 February 2025
16:00 WIB (UTC+7)

PS TGM Medan	0–4	PS Sergai
	Report

Mini Pancing Stadium, Deli Serdang
21 February 2025
16:00 WIB (UTC+7)

Agtagana	3–0 Awarded (Note: The match was awarded as a 3–0 victory to Agtagana, after Batubara United did not send their team for the match.)	Batubara United
	Report

TD Pardede Stadium, Deli Serdang

== Second round ==
The top six teams from the first round will by play in second round and will be drawn into two groups. The second round will be played in a home tournament format of single round-robin matches.

The top two teams of each group will qualify for the knockout round.

=== Group D ===
All matches will be held at Mini Pancing Stadium, Deli Serdang.

Pos	Team	Pld	W	D	L	GF	GA	GD	Pts	Qualification	SGI	BTU	PSA
1	PS Sergai	2	1	1	0	3	0	+3	4	Qualification to the Knockout round	—	—	0–0
2	Batak United	2	1	0	1	2	4	−2	3	Qualification to the Knockout round	0–3	—	—
3	PSSA	2	0	1	1	1	2	−1	1		—	1–2	—

Source: Liga 4 North Sumatra
Rules for classification: 1) Points; 2) Head-to-head points; 3) Head-to-head goal difference; 4) Head-to-head goals scored; 5) Goal difference; 6) Goals scored; 7) Fair-play points; 8) Draw.

Group D Matches

Matchday 1 (23 February 2025)
23 February 2025
13:30 WIB (UTC+7)

Batak United	0–3	PS Sergai
	Report

Mini Pancing Stadium, Deli Serdang

Matchday 2 (25 February 2025)
25 February 2025
16:00 WIB (UTC+7)

PS Sergai	0–0	PSSA
	Report

Mini Pancing Stadium, Deli Serdang

Matchday 3 (27 February 2025)
27 February 2025
13:30 WIB (UTC+7)

PSSA	1–2	Batak United
	Report

Mini Pancing Stadium, Deli Serdang

=== Group E ===
All matches will be held at Mini Pancing Stadium, Deli Serdang.

Pos	Team	Pld	W	D	L	GF	GA	GD	Pts	Qualification	KWA	VDR	TBL
1	PS Kwarta	2	2	0	0	6	1	+5	6	Qualification to the Knockout round	—	—	4–1
2	Victory Dairi	2	1	0	1	2	3	−1	3	Qualification to the Knockout round	0–2	—	—
3	Tanjungbalai United	2	0	0	2	2	6	−4	0		—	1–2	—

Source: Liga 4 North Sumatra
Rules for classification: 1) Points; 2) Head-to-head points; 3) Head-to-head goal difference; 4) Head-to-head goals scored; 5) Goal difference; 6) Goals scored; 7) Fair-play points; 8) Draw.

Group E Matches

Matchday 1 (23 February 2025)
23 February 2025
16:00 WIB (UTC+7)

PS Kwarta	4–1	Tanjungbalai United
	Report

Mini Pancing Stadium, Deli Serdang

Matchday 2 (25 February 2025)
25 February 2025
13:30 WIB (UTC+7)

Victory Dairi	0–2	PS Kwarta
	Report

Mini Pancing Stadium, Deli Serdang

Matchday 3 (27 February 2025)
27 February 2025
16:00 WIB (UTC+7)

Tanjungbalai United	1–2	Victory Dairi
	Report

Mini Pancing Stadium, Deli Serdang

== Knockout round ==
The knockout round will be played as a single match. If tied after regulation time, extra time and, if necessary, a penalty shoot-out will be used to decide the winning team. The finalist will qualify for the national phase.

=== Bracket ===
Semi-finals
5 April 2025 – Deli Serdang
D1	PS Sergai	2
E2	Victory Dairi	4
5 April 2025 – Deli Serdang
E1	PS Kwarta	4
D2	Batak United	2

Final
7 April 2025 – Deli Serdang
Victory Dairi	1
PS Kwarta	0

=== Semi-finals ===
5 April 2025
13:30 WIB (UTC+7)

PS Sergai	2–4	Victory Dairi
	Report

Mini Pancing Stadium, Deli Serdang

5 April 2025
15:30 WIB (UTC+7)

PS Kwarta	4–2	Batak United
	Report

Mini Pancing Stadium, Deli Serdang

=== Final ===
7 April 2025
16:00 WIB (UTC+7)

Victory Dairi	1–0	PS Kwarta
	Report

Mini Pancing Stadium, Deli Serdang

== See also ==
- 2024–25 Liga 4
