= 2022 Liga 3 North Sumatra =

Tournament details
- Country: Indonesia
- Dates: 14 October 2022 – TBD 2022
- Teams: 19
- Qualified for: 2022 Liga 3 National Round

The 2022 Liga 3 North Sumatra is the fifth edition of Liga 3 North Sumatra organized by Asprov PSSI Sumut.

Followed by 19 clubs. The winner of this competition will immediately advance to the national round.

PSDS is the defending champion after winning it in the 2021 season.

== Teams ==
2022 Liga 3 North Sumatra was attended by 19 teams.

No	Team	Location
01	PS Harjuna Putra	Deli Serdang Regency
02	PS Kwarta	Deli Serdang Regency
03	Paya Bakung United	Deli Serdang Regency
04	Ratu	Deli Serdang Regency
05	PS Bintang Utara Rantau Prapat	Labuhanbatu Regency
06	PS PTPN 3	Labuhanbatu Regency
07	Labura Hebat	North Labuhanbatu Regency
08	Brimo Langkat	Langkat Regency
09	Saba Bangunan United	North Padang Lawas Regency
10	PS Sergai	Serdang Bedagai Regency
11	Ar Rasyid	Central Tapanuli Regency
12	Gunung Sitoli Khoda	Gunungsitoli
13	PS Taruna Satria	Tebing Tinggi
14	Gumarang	Medan
15	PS Keluarga USU	Medan
16	FC Batak United	Medan
17	PS Patriot Medan	Medan
18	PS TGM	Medan
19	Medan Soccer	Medan

== First round ==
=== Group A ===
Pos	Team	Pld	W	D	L	GF	GA	GD	Pts	Qualification	PTP	GMG	LBH	USU	SER
1	PS PTPN 3	0	0	0	0	0	0	0	0	Advance to Knockout stage	—				
2	Gumarang	0	0	0	0	0	0	0	0	Advance to Knockout stage		—			
3	Labura Hebat	0	0	0	0	0	0	0	0				—		
4	PS Keluarga USU	0	0	0	0	0	0	0	0					—	
5	PS Sergai	0	0	0	0	0	0	0	0						—

Updated to match(es) played on unknown. Source: Liga 3 2022 North Sumatra

=== Group B ===
Pos	Team	Pld	W	D	L	GF	GA	GD	Pts	Qualification	HJP	PTM	KWT	RSD	BTU
1	PS Harjuna Putra	0	0	0	0	0	0	0	0	Advance to Knockout stage	—				
2	PS Patriot Medan	0	0	0	0	0	0	0	0	Advance to Knockout stage		—			
3	PS Kwarta	0	0	0	0	0	0	0	0				—		
4	Ar Rasyid	0	0	0	0	0	0	0	0					—	
5	PS Bintang Utara Rantau Prapat	0	0	0	0	0	0	0	0						—

Updated to match(es) played on unknown. Source: Liga 3 2022 North Sumatra

=== Group C ===
Pos	Team	Pld	W	D	L	GF	GA	GD	Pts	Qualification	RTU	GST	BUN	TRN	TGM
1	Ratu	0	0	0	0	0	0	0	0	Advance to Knockout stage	—				
2	Gunung Sitoli Khoda	0	0	0	0	0	0	0	0	Advance to Knockout stage		—			
3	FC Batak United	0	0	0	0	0	0	0	0				—		
4	PS Taruna Satria	0	0	0	0	0	0	0	0					—	
5	PS TGM	0	0	0	0	0	0	0	0						—

Updated to match(es) played on unknown. Source: Liga 3 2022 North Sumatra

=== Group D ===
Pos	Team	Pld	W	D	L	GF	GA	GD	Pts	Qualification	BMO	MSC	SBU	PBU
1	Brimo Langkat	0	0	0	0	0	0	0	0	Advance to Knockout stage	—			
2	Medan Soccer	0	0	0	0	0	0	0	0	Advance to Knockout stage		—		
3	Saba Bangunan United	0	0	0	0	0	0	0	0				—	
4	Paya Bakung United	0	0	0	0	0	0	0	0					—

Updated to match(es) played on unknown. Source: Liga 3 2022 North Sumatra

== Knockout stage ==
Wait for the completion of the group stage first.
