= 2023–24 Liga 3 North Sumatra =

Tournament details
- Dates: 11 December 2023 – 21 January 2024
- Teams: 13

Final positions
- Champions: Labura Hebat (1st title)
- Runners-up: PS PTPN III
- Third place: Paya Bakung United
- Fourth place: Gumarang
- Qualified to: Liga 3 National phase

Tournament statistics
- Matches played: 43
- Goals scored: 137 (3.19 per match)

The 2023–24 Liga 3 North Sumatra was the sixth season of Liga 3 North Sumatra as a qualifying round for the national phase of the 2023–24 Liga 3.

Followed by 13 clubs. The winner of this competition will immediately advance to the national phase.

PSDS is the defending champion after winning it in the 2021 season.

== Teams ==
2023–24 Liga 3 North Sumatra was attended by 13 teams.

No	Team	Location
1	Batubara Bisa	Batubara Regency
2	PS Kwarta	Deli Serdang Regency
3	Paya Bakung United	Deli Serdang Regency
4	Ratu	Deli Serdang Regency
5	Poslab	Labuhanbatu Regency
6	PS PTPN III	Labuhanbatu Regency
7	Labura Hebat	North Labuhanbatu Regency
8	Brimo Langkat	Langkat Regency
9	Gumarang	Medan City
10	PS Keluarga USU	Medan City
11	Batak United	Medan City
12	PS TGM	Medan City
13	Pelita Medan Soccer	Medan City

== Venues ==
- USU Mini Stadium, Medan City

== First round ==
=== Group A ===
Pos	Team	Pld	W	D	L	GF	GA	GD	Pts	Qualification	RFC	BBB	BUN
1	Ratu	4	3	1	0	5	2	+3	10	Advance to Second round	—	1–0	1–0
2	Batubara Bisa	4	0	3	1	1	2	−1	3	Advance to Second round	1–1	—	0–0
3	Batak United	4	0	2	2	1	3	−2	2		1–2	0–0	—

Source: Liga 3 Sumatra Utara 2023

=== Group B ===
Pos	Team	Pld	W	D	L	GF	GA	GD	Pts	Qualification	PTP	PBU	BRI
1	PS PTPN III	4	3	1	0	17	3	+14	10	Advance to Second round	—	2–1	5–0
2	PS Paya Bakung United	4	2	1	1	14	8	+6	7	Advance to Second round	2–2	—	5–3
3	Brimo Langkat	4	0	0	4	4	24	−20	0		0–8	1–6	—

Source: Liga 3 Sumatra Utara 2023

=== Group C ===
Pos	Team	Pld	W	D	L	GF	GA	GD	Pts	Qualification	KWR	TGM	PMS
1	PS Kwarta	4	2	1	1	10	2	+8	7 (Note: Tied on head-to-head points. Head-to-head goal difference: PS Kwarta +3, PS TGM −3.)	Advance to Second round	—	0–1	1–1
2	PS TGM	4	2	1	1	5	6	−1	7	Advance to Second round	0–4	—	1–1
3	Pelita Medan Soccer	4	0	2	2	3	10	−7	2		0–5	1–3	—

Source: Liga 3 Sumatra Utara 2023

=== Group D ===
Pos	Team	Pld	W	D	L	GF	GA	GD	Pts	Qualification	LHB	GFC	PLB	USU
1	Labura Hebat	6	6	0	0	20	3	+17	18	Advance to Second round	—	5–0	2–1	4–0
2	Gumarang	6	2	0	4	7	14	−7	6	Advance to Second round	1–3	—	1–0	1–2
3	Poslab	6	1	2	3	7	10	−3	5		0–4	3–0	—	1–1
4	PS Keluarga USU	6	1	2	3	7	14	−7	5		1–2	1–4	2–2	—

Source: Liga 3 Sumatra Utara 2023

== Second round ==
=== Group E ===
Pos	Team	Pld	W	D	L	GF	GA	GD	Pts	Qualification
1	PS Paya Bakung United	3	2	1	0	3	0	+3	7	Advance to the Knockout Round
2	Gumarang	3	1	2	0	4	2	+2	5	Advance to the Knockout Round
3	PS Kwarta	3	1	1	1	6	3	+3	4	
4	Ratu	3	0	0	3	0	8	−8	0	

Source: Liga 3 Sumatra Utara 2023
11 January 2024
14:00 WIB

Ratu	0−2	PS Paya Bakung United
	Report

USU Mini Stadium, Medan City
11 January 2024
16:15 WIB

PS Kwarta	2−2	Gumarang
	Report

USU Mini Stadium, Medan City

13 January 2024
14:00 WIB

PS Kwarta	4–0	Ratu
	Report

USU Mini Stadium, Medan City
13 January 2024
16:15 WIB

Gumarang	0–0	PS Paya Bakung United
	Report

USU Mini Stadium, Medan City

15 January 2024
14:00 WIB

Paya Bakung United	1−0	PS Kwarta
	Report

USU Mini Stadium, Medan City
15 January 2024
16:15 WIB

Ratu	0−2	Gumarang
	Report

USU Mini Stadium, Medan City

=== Group F ===
Pos	Team	Pld	W	D	L	GF	GA	GD	Pts	Qualification
1	Labura Hebat	2	1	1	0	7	0	+7	4	Advance to the Knockout Round
2	PS PTPN III	2	0	2	0	1	1	0	2	Advance to the Knockout Round
3	PS TGM	2	0	1	1	1	8	−7	1	
4	Batubara Bisa	0	0	0	0	0	0	0	0	Withdrew (Note: As of 30 December 2023, Batubara Bisa was confirmed to have withdrawn from participation in the second round, due to injuries to many players and a financial crisis that hit club management.)

Source: Liga 3 Sumatra Utara 2023
12 January 2024
15:30 WIB

PS PTPN III	1−1	PS TGM
	Report

USU Mini Stadium, Medan City

14 January 2024
15:30 WIB

PS TGM	0–7	Labura Hebat
	Report

USU Mini Stadium, Medan City

16 January 2024
15:30 WIB

Labura Hebat	0–0	PS PTPN III
	Report

USU Mini Stadium, Medan City

== Knockout round ==
=== Bracket ===
Semi-finals
18 January 2024 – Medan
E1	PS Paya Bakung United	0
F2	PS PTPN III (a.e.t.)	2
19 January 2024 – Medan
F1	Labura Hebat	5
E2	Gumarang	0

Final
21 January 2024 – Medan
PS PTPN III	1
Labura Hebat	2
Third place play-off
20 January 2024 – Medan
PS Paya Bakung United	4
Gumarang	0

=== Semi-finals ===
18 January 2024
15:00 WIB

PS Paya Bakung United	0–2 (a.e.t.)	PS PTPN III
	Report

USU Mini Stadium, Medan City

19 January 2024
15:00 WIB

Labura Hebat	5–0	Gumarang
	Report

USU Mini Stadium, Medan City

=== Third place play-off ===
20 January 2024
15:00 WIB

PS Paya Bakung United	4–0	Gumarang
	Report

USU Mini Stadium, Medan City

=== Final ===
21 January 2024
15:00 WIB

PS PTPN III	1–2	Labura Hebat
	Report

USU Mini Stadium, Medan City

== Qualification to the national phase ==
Team	Method of qualification	Date of qualification	Qualified to
Labura Hebat	2023–24 Liga 3 North Sumatra champions	21 January 2024	2023–24 Liga 3 National Phase
PS PTPN III	2023–24 Liga 3 North Sumatra runner-up	21 January 2024	2023–24 Liga 3 National Phase

== See also ==
- 2023–24 Liga 3 National Phase
- 2023 Liga 3 Aceh
