= 2025–26 Liga 4 North Sumatra =

2025–26 Liga 4 North Sumatra Governor's Cup

Tournament details
- Country: Indonesia
- Venue: 4
- Dates: 26 March – 17 April 2026
- Teams: 17

Final positions
- Champions: PS Paya Bakung United (1st title)
- Runners-up: PS Kwarta
- Third place: Binjai City
- Fourth place: Batubara United
- Qualification for: 2025–26 Liga 4 national phase
- All statistics correct as of complete.

The 2025–26 Liga 4 North Sumatra (also known as the 2025–26 Liga 4 North Sumatra Governor's Cup) is the second season of the Liga 4 North Sumatra zone organized by the Provincial Association (Asprov) of PSSI North Sumatra.

A total of 17 teams participated in this competition. The winner will qualify directly for the 2025–26 Liga 4 national phase as the representative of North Sumatra, to compete for promotion to the Liga Nusantara.

== Background ==
Following the PSSI administrative restructuring, Liga 4 serves as the fourth tier of Indonesian football league system. The North Sumatra zone remains one of the most competitive regional series in Indonesia. This season, the competition carries the prestige of the Governor's Cup (Indonesian: Piala Gubernur), aimed at revitalizing local football talent and providing a clear path for amateur clubs to reach the semi-professional tiers.

== Format ==
The competition is divided into several stages:

- First round: The 17 participating teams are divided into three groups (Group A, B, and C). Matches are played in a round-robin format at centralized venues in Medan.
- Second round: The top teams from each group qualify for the Second Round to determine the finalists.
- Knockout stage: The competition concludes with a final match to determine the regional champion.

== Teams ==
The following 17 participating teams are participating in the 2025–26 Liga 4 North Sumatra.

=== Location map ===
Locations of teams in the 2025–26 Liga 4 North Sumatra.
Deli Serdang: Muspika, PS Paya Bakung United, PS Harjuna Putra, PS Kwarta, Ratu
Medan: Gumarang, Pelita Medan Soccer, PS TGM Medan
Serdang Bedagai: PS Satria Muda, Agtagana

=== Participating teams ===
| No | Teams | Regency/City |
|---|---|---|
| 1 | Batubara United | Batubara Regency |
| 2 | Muspika | Deli Serdang Regency |
| 3 | Ratu | Deli Serdang Regency |
| 4 | PS Harjuna Putra | Deli Serdang Regency |
| 5 | PS Kwarta | Deli Serdang Regency |
| 6 | PS Paya Bakung United | Deli Serdang Regency |
| 7 | Poslab | Labuhanbatu Regency |
| 8 | Brimo Langkat | Langkat Regency |
| 9 | Agtagana | Serdang Bedagai Regency |
| 10 | PS Satria Muda | Serdang Bedagai Regency |
| 11 | Gunungsitoli Khoda | Gunungsitoli City |
| 12 | Binjai City | Binjai City |
| 13 | Gumarang | Medan City |
| 14 | Pelita Medan Soccer | Medan City |
| 15 | PS TGM Medan | Medan City |
| 16 | Tanjungbalai United | Tanjungbalai City |
| 17 | PS Taruna Satria | Tebing Tinggi City |

== Venues ==
There are several venues used in the Liga 4 North Sumatra competition for the 2025–26 season, namely in Medan and Deli Serdang.

- Cadika Field, Medan
- Mini Pancing Stadium, Deli Serdang
- Yon Zipur Kodam 1/Bukit Barisan Field, Medan
- UNIMED Stadium, Medan

== First round ==
=== Group A ===
| Pos | Team | Pld | W | D | L | GF | GA | GD | Pts | Qualification |
|---|---|---|---|---|---|---|---|---|---|---|
| 1 | Binjai City | 5 | 5 | 0 | 0 | 13 | 3 | +10 | 15 | Qualification to second round |
| 2 | PS Kwarta | 5 | 3 | 1 | 1 | 9 | 3 | +6 | 10 | Qualification to second round |
| 3 | PS Harjuna Putra | 5 | 3 | 1 | 1 | 9 | 3 | +6 | 10 | |
| 4 | Gunungsitoli Khoda | 5 | 1 | 1 | 3 | 6 | 9 | −3 | 4 | |
| 5 | Poslab | 5 | 0 | 2 | 3 | 5 | 14 | −9 | 2 | |
| 6 | Brimo Langkat | 5 | 0 | 1 | 4 | 4 | 14 | −10 | 1 | |

Source: Liga 4 North Sumatra

=== Group B ===
| Pos | Team | Pld | W | D | L | GF | GA | GD | Pts | Qualification |
|---|---|---|---|---|---|---|---|---|---|---|
| 1 | Gumarang | 5 | 4 | 1 | 0 | 7 | 2 | +5 | 13 | Qualification to second round |
| 2 | Batubara United | 5 | 3 | 1 | 1 | 11 | 7 | +4 | 10 | Qualification to second round |
| 3 | Agtagana | 5 | 3 | 0 | 2 | 12 | 7 | +5 | 9 | |
| 4 | PS TGM Medan | 5 | 2 | 1 | 2 | 10 | 7 | +3 | 7 | |
| 5 | Ratu | 5 | 0 | 2 | 3 | 5 | 12 | −7 | 2 | |
| 6 | PS Taruna Satria | 5 | 0 | 1 | 4 | 7 | 17 | −10 | 1 | |

Source: Liga 4 North Sumatra

=== Group C ===
| Pos | Team | Pld | W | D | L | GF | GA | GD | Pts | Qualification |
|---|---|---|---|---|---|---|---|---|---|---|
| 1 | PS Paya Bakung United | 4 | 2 | 2 | 0 | 6 | 4 | +2 | 8 | Qualification to second round |
| 2 | Pelita Medan Soccer | 4 | 2 | 1 | 1 | 7 | 5 | +2 | 7 | Qualification to second round |
| 3 | PS Satria Muda | 4 | 2 | 1 | 1 | 7 | 5 | +2 | 7 | |
| 4 | Muspika | 4 | 0 | 3 | 1 | 6 | 8 | −2 | 3 | |
| 5 | Tanjungbalai United | 4 | 0 | 1 | 3 | 4 | 8 | −4 | 1 | |

Source: Liga 4 North Sumatra

== Second round ==
The second round features the six teams that advanced from the first round. The teams will be drawn into two groups of three, with the winners and runners-up of each group qualifying for the semi-finals.

=== Qualified teams ===
The following teams have secured their places in the second round based on their performances in the first round:

| Group | Winners | Runners-up |
|---|---|---|
| A | Binjai City | PS Kwarta |
| B | Gumarang | Batubara United |
| C | PS Paya Bakung United | Pelita Medan Soccer |

=== Group D ===
| Pos | Team | Pld | W | D | L | GF | GA | GD | Pts | |
|---|---|---|---|---|---|---|---|---|---|---|
| 1 | Batubara United | 2 | 1 | 1 | 0 | 7 | 3 | +4 | 4 | Qualification to knockout stage |
| 2 | PS Paya Bakung United | 2 | 1 | 1 | 0 | 2 | 1 | +1 | 4 | Qualification to knockout stage |
| 3 | Gumarang | 2 | 0 | 0 | 2 | 2 | 7 | −5 | 0 | |

Source: Liga 4 North Sumatra
Rules for classification: 1) Points; 2) Head-to-head points; 3) Goal difference; 4) Goals scored.

=== Group E ===
| Pos | Team | Pld | W | D | L | GF | GA | GD | Pts | |
|---|---|---|---|---|---|---|---|---|---|---|
| 1 | Binjai City | 2 | 2 | 0 | 0 | 8 | 1 | +7 | 6 | Qualification to knockout stage |
| 2 | PS Kwarta | 2 | 1 | 0 | 1 | 2 | 2 | 0 | 3 | Qualification to knockout stage |
| 3 | Pelita Medan Soccer | 2 | 0 | 0 | 2 | 1 | 8 | −7 | 0 | |

Source: Liga 4 North Sumatra
Rules for classification: 1) Points; 2) Head-to-head points; 3) Goal difference; 4) Goals scored.

== Knockout stage ==
=== Bracket ===
Semi-finals
14 April 2026 — Mini Pancing Stadium, Deli Serdang
E1 | Binjai City | 0 (3)
D2 | PS Paya Bakung United | 0 (4)
14 April 2026 — Mini Pancing Stadium, Deli Serdang
D1 | Batubara United | 1
E2 | PS Kwarta | 4

Final
17 April 2026 — Mini Pancing Stadium, Deli Serdang
PS Paya Bakung United | 2 (4)
PS Kwarta | 2 (2)
Third-place play-off
16 April 2026 — Mini Pancing Stadium, Deli Serdang
Binjai City | 8
Batubara United | 1

=== Knockout matches ===
Semi-finals (14 April 2026)

==== Semi-final 1 ====
14 April 2026
13:00 (UTC+07:00)

| Binjai City | 0–0 | PS Paya Bakung United |
|---|---|---|
| | Report |
Penalties
| | 3–4 |

Mini Pancing Stadium, Deli Serdang

==== Semi-final 2 ====
14 April 2026
15:30 (UTC+07:00)

| Batubara United | 1–4 | PS Kwarta |
|---|---|---|
| | Report |

Mini Pancing Stadium, Deli Serdang

3rd place and Final (16–17 April 2026)

==== Third-place play-off ====
16 April 2026
15:00 (UTC+07:00)

| Binjai City | 8–1 | Batubara United |
|---|---|---|
| | Report |

Mini Pancing Stadium, Deli Serdang

==== Final ====
17 April 2026
15:00 (UTC+07:00)

| PS Paya Bakung United | 2–2 (a.e.t.) | PS Kwarta |
|---|---|---|
| | Report |
Penalties
| | 4–2 |

Mini Pancing Stadium, Deli Serdang

== See also ==
- 2025–26 Liga 4
