= 2017 Liga 3 North Sumatra =

Liga 3 North Sumatra
- Season: 2017

The 2017 Liga 3 North Sumatra is the third edition of Liga 3 North Sumatra as a qualifying round for 2017 Liga 3.

The competition scheduled started on August 1, 2017.

Group A and B matches were played at Mencirim City Stadium, Group C at Disporasu Mini Stadium, Group D at Baharuddin Siregar Stadium, Group E at Mutiara Kisaran Stadium and Group F at Pemda Mandailing Natal Stadium.

== Teams ==
There are 29 clubs which will participate the league in this season.

Group A
Mencirim City FC
PSKB Binjai
PS Kwarta
PS Keluarga USU
Toba Samosir FC

Group B
Kurnia FC
Binjai United
Thamrin Graha Metropolitan
PS Harjuna Putra
PS Tasbi

Group C
PS PLN Sumut
Gumarang FC
Medan Soccer FC
PS Patriot Disporasu
Medan Utama FC

Group D
PSDS Deli Serdang
Agtagana FC
Deli Serdang FC
PS Sergai (Serdang Bedagai)
Victory Dairi FC

Group E
PSSA Asahan
Tanjungbalai United
PS Taruna Satria
PSKTS Tebingtinggi

Group F
Madina Jaya FC
PS Palas (Padang Lawas)
Mandailing Raya FC
RBS FC Padang Sidempuan
Perstu North Tapanuli
