= Liga 3 North Sumatra =

Lowest tier in Indonesian football league system

- Founded: 2017; 9 years ago
- Country: Indonesia
- Confederation: AFC
- Level on pyramid: 3
- Promotion to: Liga 3 National round
- Domestic cup: Piala Indonesia
- Most championships: PSDS (3 title)
- Current: 2022

Liga 3 North Sumatra is a third level Indonesian football competition held by Asprov PSSI North Sumatra since 2017. It is also a qualification to qualify for the Liga 3 National round

PSDS became the most successful team (3 title)

== List of Champions ==
=== Results ===
Year	Team	Final			Third place match			ref
Year	Team	Winners	Score	Runners-up	Third place	Score	Fourth place	ref
2017	29	PSDS	1–0	PS Keluarga USU	No data			
2018	28	PSDS	3–1	Medan Utama	PS Bhinneka	2–1	Tanjung Balai United	
2019	30	Karo United	5–2	PS Bhinneka	PSDS	8–2	Batak United	
2020	Cancelled due to COVID-19 pandemic							
2021	34	PSDS	1–1 (5–3 p)	YOB Belawan	Karo United	3–0	PS Harjuna Putra	

=== Performances ===
Team	Champions	Runners-up	Third place	Fourth place
PSDS	3 (2017, 2018, 2021)		1 (2019)	
Karo United	1 (2019)		1 (2021)	
PS Bhinneka		1 (2019)	1 (2018)	
PS Keluarga USU		1 (2017)		
Medan Utama		1 (2018)		
YOB Belawan		1 (2021)		
Tanjung Balai United				1 (2018)
Batak United				1 (2019)
PS Harjuna Putra				1 (2021)
