= Lubuk Pakam =

Coordinates: 3°34′N 98°52′E

Lubuk Pakam (Chinese: 巴幹; Pe̍h-ōe-jī: pa kàn) is a town and an administrative district (kecamatan) in North Sumatra province of Indonesia and it is the seat (capital) of Deli Serdang Regency. The district covers an area of 31.19 km^{2}, and had a population of 80,847 at the 2010 Census and 88,576 at the 2020 Census; the official estimate as at mid 2024 was 94,178 (comprising 46,627 males and 47,551 females). The district is sub-divided into 7 urban communities (kelurahan) and 6 rural villages (desa), all 13 listed below with their areas and their populations at the 2020 Census and as at the official estimates for mid 2024, together with their postcodes.

| Kode Wilayah | Name | Area in km^{2} | Population Census 2020 | Population Estimate mid 2024 | Post code |
|---|---|---|---|---|---|
| 12.07.21.2001 | Sekip | 3.64 | 19,939 | 21,867 | 20517 |
| 12.07.28.2002 | Pagar Jati | 2.30 | 6,711 | 7,124 | 20518 |
| 12.07.28.2003 | Tanjung Garbus I | 5.12 | 3,489 | 3,679 | 20511 |
| 12.07.28.2004 | Pasar Melintang | 5.59 | 6,772 | 6,878 | 20518 |
| 12.07.28.2005 | Pagar Merbau III | 5.72 | 4,450 | 4,870 | 20515 |
| 12.07.28.2006 | Bakaran Baru | 2.82 | 11,174 | 12,011 | 20511 |
| 12.07.28.1007 | Lubuk Pakam I-II | 0.43 | 6,680 | 7,052 | 20511 |
| 12.07.28.1008 | Lubuk Pakam III | 0.18 | 4,135 | 4,270 | 20516 |
| 12.07.28.1009 | Paluh Kemiri | 1.45 | 3,645 | 4,182 | 20513 |
| 12.07.28.1010 | Cemara | 0.78 | 7,779 | 8,028 | 20517 |
| 12.07.28.1011 | Syahmad | 0.48 | 4,497 | 4,821 | 20515 |
| 12.07.28.1012 | Petapahan | 1.99 | 2,174 | 2,189 | 20514 |
| 12.07.28.1013 | Lubuk Pakam Pekan | 0.69 | 7,131 | 7,207 | 20512 |

In the above table, the first six listed have the status of rural villages (desa) and the last seven have the status of urban communities (kelurahan).

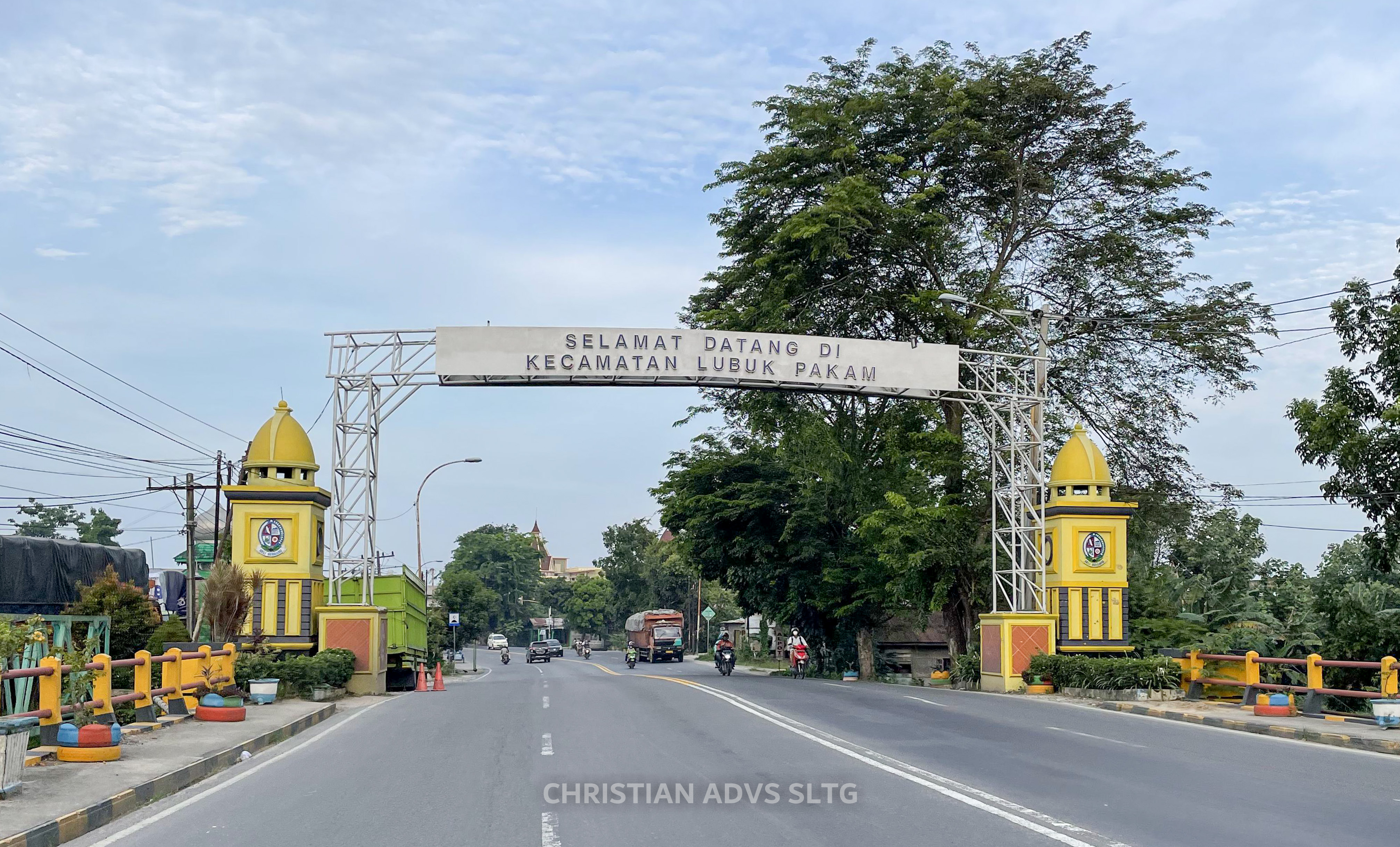
Welcome gate of Lubuk Pakam

== Controversy ==
The area supports a large plantation for London Sumatra, whose notable claim to fame in recent years is in its confrontation with local villagers who want their land back. A leading oil palm company "PT London Sumatra", with backing from Cadbury's and Deutsche Bank, were allegedly intimidating a local community which is fighting for the return of their forest lands.

The villagers of Pergulaan have peacefully sought to regain 1.69 square kilometres of land which was stolen from them years ago to create an oil palm plantation. In June 2004 it was alleged that London Sumatra had dug a massive ditch, 6 metres deep and 4 wide, around the village to cut off the protesting villagers. The most recent reports were that militias have been sent to violently silence the villagers.
