= Pantai Labu =

the welcome village gate of Sei Tuan,Pantai Labu Subdistrict

Pantai Labu is an administrative district (kecamatan) situated on the coast of the Deli Serdang Regency of the Indonesian province of North Sumatra. According to the 2020 census, it had a population of 49,167 and an area of 85.83 km^{2}; the official estimate as at mid 2024 was 54,697 (comprising 27,873 males and 26,824 females).

== Villages ==
The nineteen villages (desa) are listed with their areas and their populations as at mid 2024, all sharing the postcode of 20553.

Kode Wilayah	Name of village	Area (km^{2})	Pop'n 2024 Estimate
12.07.32.2001	Sei Tuan	13.62	1,640
12.07.32.2002	Tengah	4.01	1,227
12.07.32.2017	Kelambir	4.09	2,550
12.07.32.2018	Durian	9.05	5,648
12.07.32.2006	Kubah Sentang	3.29	1,664
12.07.32.2011	Perkebunan Ramunia	5.04	2,712
12.07.32.2010	Ramunia Dua	2.93	2,650
12.07.32.2009	Ramunia Satu	4.61	1,217
12.07.32.2014	Denai Sarang Burung	2.22	3,590
12.07.32.2012	Denai Lama	4.28	3,476

Kode Wilayah	Name of village	Area (km^{2})	Pop'n 2024 Estimate
12.07.32.2015	Binjai Bakung	2.54	2,035
12.07.32.2013	Denai Kuala	7.38	3,129
12.07.32.2016	Paluh Sibaji	3.36	4,604
12.07.32.2008	Pantai Labu Baru	1.51	1,099
12.07.32.2007	Pantai Labu Pekan	3.51	4,669
12.07.32.2005	Rugemuk	4.77	3,367
12.07.32.2019	Pematang Biara	4.99	4,603
12.07.32.2004	Rantau Panjang	1.93	3,125
12.07.32.2003	Bagan Serdang	2.70	1,692
Totals	District	85.83	54,697
