= Beringin =

Beringin is a district or kecamatan in the Deli Serdang Regency in the Indonesian province of North Sumatra, with a land area of 56.94 km^{2}. As of the 2020 census, it had a population of 60,711; the official population estimate as at mid 2024 was 67,904 (comprising 34,132 males and 33,772 females). It is sub-divided into eleven rural villages (desa).

== Villages ==
The eleven villages (desa) are listed with their areas and their populations as at mid 2024, all sharing the postcode of 20552.

| Kode Wilayah | Name of village | Area (km^{2}) | Pop'n 2024 Estimate |
|---|---|---|---|
| 12.07.33.2011 | Tumpatan | 2.66 | 9,365 |
| 12.07.33.2005 | Emplasmen Kuala Namu | 6.26 | 2,671 |
| 12.07.33.2010 | Sidodadi Ramunia | 8.39 | 15,354 |
| 12.07.33.2006 | Pasar V Kebun Kelapa | 2.59 | 7,995 |
| 12.07.33.2003 | Aras Kabu | 4.27 | 3,911 |
| 12.07.33.2001 | Serdang | 4.35 | 2,795 |
| 12.07.33.2002 | Sidourip | 2.24 | 2,639 |
| 12.07.33.2004 | Pasar VI Kuala Namu | 7.53 | 1,097 |
| 12.07.33.2006 | Karang Anyar | 6.59 | 9,899 |
| 12.07.33.2007 | Beringin | 1.95 | 8,978 |
| 12.07.33.2008 | Sidoarjo II Ramunia | 10.11 | 3,200 |
| Totals for | District | 56.94 | 67,904 |

Note that the Roman numerals in three of the desa names are often replaced by the names of these numerals: "II" becomes "Dua", "V" becomes "Lima" and "VI" becomes "Enam".
