= Galang, Deli Serdang =

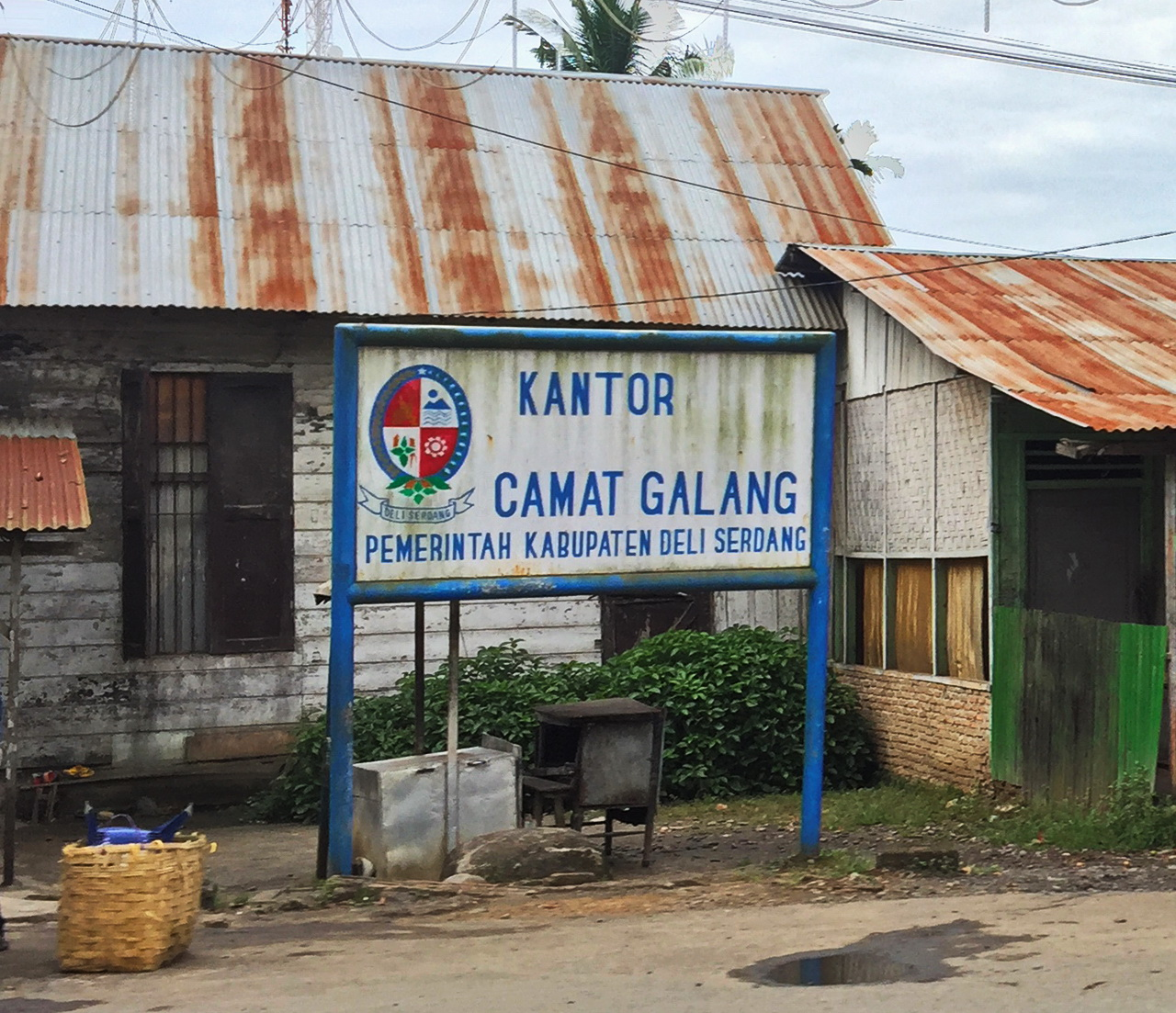
Office district of Galang, Deli Serdang, Indonesia

Galang is a district or kecamatan in the Deli Serdang Regency in the Indonesian province of North Sumatra, with a land area of 129.09 km^{2}. As of the 2020 census, it had a population of 70,136; the official population estimate as at mid 2024 was 75,932 (comprising 38,158 males and 37,774 females). It is sub-divided into the town (kelurahan) of Galang and 28 rural villages (desa).

== Villages ==
The 28 villages (desa) and the town (kelurahan) of Galang Kota are listed with their areas and their populations as at mid 2024, all sharing the postcode of 20585.

Kode Wilayah	Name of village	Area (km^{2})	Pop'n 2024 Estimate
12.07.19.2022	(Kampung) Paku	5.61	1,959
12.07.19.2003	Bandar Kwala	6.50	1,191
12.07.19.2002	Baru Titi Besi	0.56	879
12.07.19.2027	Pulau Tagor Baru	4.68	1,052
12.07.19.2006	Galang Barat (West Galang)	11.18	1,227
12.07.19.2015	Kotangan	7.86	1,479
12.07.19.2030	Sungei Putih	6.89	1,552
12.07.19.2028	Paya Kuda	7.36	498
12.07.19.2016	(Kampung) Kelapa Satu	0.91	1,458
12.07.19.2025	Pisang Pala	0.68	2,307
12.07.19.2023	Petumbukan	0.37	2,810
12.07.19.2001	Tanjung Gusti	2.04	2,279
12.07.19.2031	Sungai Karang	1.42	836
12.07.19.2005	(Kampung) Galang Suka	1.72	4,284
12.07.19.1038	Galang Kota (town)	1.66	9,534

Kode Wilayah	Name of village	Area (km^{2})	Pop'n 2024 Estimate
12.07.19.2035	Timbang Deli	7.24	3,869
12.07.19.2007	Jaharum A	3.41	5,719
12.07.19.2036	Tanah Merah	1.43	2,601
12.07.19.2024	Pertangguhan	2.61	3,865
12.07.19.2037	Tanjung Siporkis	7.22	1,508
12.07.19.2004	Batu Lokong	17.52	1,152
12.07.19.2019	Naga Rejo	2.90	7,156
12.07.19.2026	Paya Itik	3.00	1,697
12.07.19.2029	Paya Sampir	4.83	170
12.07.19.2009	(Kampung) Johar Baru	2.75	442
12.07.19.2013	Kotasan	2.61	4,095
12.07.19.2008	Jaharum B	4.68	7,413
12.07.19.2034	Tanah Abang	6.08	460
12.07.19.2012	Kramat Gajah	3.39	2,440
Totals for	District	129.09	75,932
