= Biru-Biru =

Biru-Biru is an administrative district (kecamatan) situated to the south of the city of Medan in the Deli Serdang Regency of the Indonesian province of North Sumatra. According to the 2020 census, it had a population of 39,083 and an area of 89.69 km^{2}; the official estimate as at mid 2024 was 41,607.

== Villages ==
The seventeen villages (desa) are listed from south to north, with their areas and their populations as at mid 2024, all sharing the postcode of 20358. The more heavily populated villages in the north of the district, notably the desa of Sidomulyo, are mainly suburban to Medan.

| Kode Wilayah | Name of village (desa) | Area (km^{2}) | Pop'n 2024 Estimate |
|---|---|---|---|
| 12.07.07.2007 | Mardinding Julu | 6.69 | 611 |
| 12.07.07.2010 | Penen | 4.46 | 1,154 |
| 12.07.07.2009 | Per Ria-Ria | 7.01 | 1,494 |
| 12.07.07.2015 | Sari Laba Jahe | 8.88 | 1,332 |
| 12.07.07.2002 | Biru-Biru (village) | 1.34 | 1,494 |
| 12.07.07.2005 | Kuala Dekah | 10.26 | 1,182 |
| 12.07.07.2011 | Rumah Gerat | 12.05 | 1,580 |
| 12.07.07.2016 | Tanjung Sena | 5.80 | 678 |
| 12.07.07.2004 | Kuta Mulyo | 4.02 | 2,272 |
| Totals for | Southern group | 60.51 | 11,797 |

| Kode Wilayah | Name of village (desa) | Area (km^{2}) | Pop'n 2024 Estimate |
|---|---|---|---|
| 12.07.07.2006 | Mbaruai | 3.88 | 1,735 |
| 12.07.07.2017 | Namo Tualang | 6.25 | 2,478 |
| 12.07.07.2014 | Kampung Selamat | 1.56 | 3,108 |
| 12.07.07.2012 | Sidodadi | 1.25 | 4,891 |
| 12.07.07.2008 | Namo Suro Baru | 5.35 | 1,456 |
| 12.07.07.2001 | Aji Baho | 7.59 | 2,518 |
| 12.07.07.2003 | Candi Rejo | 1.07 | 5,350 |
| 12.07.07.2013 | Sidomulyo | 2.23 | 8,274 |
| Totals for | Northern group | 29.18 | 29,810 |
