= Deli Tua =

Deli Tua is a town and administrative district within Deli Serdang Regency of North Sumatra province of Indonesia. It covers an area of 9.36 km^{2}, and had a population of 59,292 at the 2020 Census; the official estimate in mid 2024 was 62,274 - comprising 31,286 males and 30,988 females. It lies immediately south of Medan city, of which it is effectively a suburb. The district comprises six administrative "villages", listed below with their areas and their populations at the 2020 Census and as at the official estimates for mid 2024, of which the first three (situated in the north of the district) have the status of desa, and the last three (in the south of the district) have the status of kelurahan; all share the postcode of 20355.

Kode Wilayah	Name	Area in km^{2}	Population Census 2020	Population Estimate mid 2024
12.07.22.2001	Kedai Durian	1.57	9,984	10,918
12.07.22.2002	Suka Makmur	1.65	11,385	11,345
12.07.22.2003	Mekar Sari	1.57	10,565	11,038
12.07.22.1004	Deli Tua (town)	1.445	12,712	13,313
12.07.22.1005	Deli Tua Timur (East Deli Tua)	1.775	6,941	7,528
12.07.22.1006	Deli Tua Barat (West Deli Tua)	1.35	7,705	8,132
12.07.22	Totals	9.36	59,292	62,274

The weather conditions in Deli Tua are hot and cloudy, with a temperature range of 74 to 90 degrees Fahrenheit (~23 to ~32 Celsius). The month with the least turbulent weather on average is February, and on the contrary the most overcast month is October. The wet season in Deli Tua lasts from mid August to the end of December, the dry season being the remaining months. During October the town sees approx. 10 inches of rain. Humidity levels stay at nearly 100% throughout the year. Daylight in Deli Tua stays consistent, right around 12 hours a day for most of the year.
