= Pagar Merbau =

Pagar Merbau is an administrative district (kecamatan) within the Deli Serdang Regency of the Indonesian province of North Sumatra. According to the 2020 census, it had a population of 39,814 and an area of 63.28 km^{2}; the official estimate as at mid 2024 was 43,384 (comprising 21,737 males and 21,647 females).

== Villages ==
The sixteen villages (desa) are listed with their areas and their populations as at mid 2024, all sharing the postcode of 20551.

Kode Wilayah	Name of village	Area (km^{2})	Pop'n 2024 Estimate
12.07.31.2010	Bandar Dolok	8.14	1,284
12.07.31.2011	Tanjung Garbus Dua	3.77	270
12.07.31.2013	Perbarakan	3.43	2,984
12.07.31.2012	Tanjung Garbus Kampung	3.67	2,115
12.07.31.2001	Tanjung Mulia	1.67	6,111
12.07.31.2002	Purwodadi	0.94	3,166
12.07.31.2004	Sukamulia	0.71	2,238
12.07.31.2003	Sidodadi Batu Delapan	0.32	1,833

Kode Wilayah	Name of village	Area (km^{2})	Pop'n 2024 Estimate
12.07.31.2005	Jatirejo	0.43	2,119
12.07.31.2009	Sidoarjo Satu Jatibaru	1.95	2,260
12.07.31.2008	Sidoarjo I Pasar Miring	2.87	5,470
12.07.31.2006	Pagar Merbau Satu	1.72	1,563
12.07.31.2007	Pagar Merbau Dua	22.31	2,199
12.07.31.2016	Sumberejo	2.77	4,357
12.07.31.2015	Sukamandi Hulu	2.73	1,590
12.07.31.2014	Sukamandi Hilir	5.84	3,825
Totals for	District	63.28	43,384
