= Patumbak =

Patumbak is a town and administrative district within Deli Serdang Regency of North Sumatra province of Indonesia. It covers an area of 43.54 square kilometres (16.81 sq mi), and had a population of 88,961 at the 2010 Census and 97,994 at the 2020 Census; the official estimate as of mid-2024 was 106,762, consisting of 53,802 males and 52,960 females. It lies immediately southeast of Medan city, of which it is effectively a suburb. The district comprises eight administrative "villages", listed below with their areas and their populations at the 2020 Census and as at the official estimates for mid 2024, all of which have the status of desa and share the postcode of 20361.

Kode Wilayah	Name	Area in km^{2}	Population Census 2020	Population Estimate mid 2024
12.07.21.2002	Patumbak I (Patumbak Satu)	4.21	7,136	8,086
12.07.21.2001	Lantasan Baru	3.50	2,595	2,868
12.07.21.2004	Lantasan Lama	3.41	4,219	5,205
12.07.21.2003	Patumbak II (Patumbak Dua)	10.41	8,655	9,142
Sub-totals	Southern half	21.53	22,605	25,301
12.07.21.2005	Sigara Gara	4.62	11,532	13,119
12.07.21.2006	Marendal I (Marendal Satu)	8.96	30,419	33,791
12.07.21.2008	Patumbak Kampung	2.63	16,674	17,139
12.07.21.2007	Marendal II (Marendal Dua)	5.81	16,764	17,412
Sub-totals	Northern half	22.02	75,389	81,461
12.07.21	Totals	43.54	97,994	106,762

The first four of these desa lie in the south half of the district, and the last four lie in the more densely populated north half. A portion of Marendal Dua desa is a northern exclave of the district, from which it is separated by a part of Medan city

The weather conditions in Deli Tua are hot and cloudy, with a temperature range of 74 to 90 degrees Fahrenheit (~23 to ~32 Celsius). The month with the least turbulent weather on average is February, and on the contrary the most overcast month is October. The wet season in Deli Tua lasts from mid August to the end of December, the dry season being the remaining months. During October the town sees approx. 10 inches of rain. Humidity levels stay at nearly 100% throughout the year. Daylight in Deli Tua stays consistent, right around 12 hours a day for most of the year.
