= PSSA Asahan =

Indonesian football club

- Full name: Persatuan Sepakbola Seluruh Asahan
- Nickname: Naga Bekisar
- Ground: Mutiara Kisaran Stadium
- Capacity: 10,000
- Owner: Askab PSSI Asahan
- Chairman: Armen Margolang
- Manager: Aben Situmorang
- Coach: Abdul Rahman
- League: Liga 4
- 2018: 3rd in Group A, (North Sumatra zone)
Home colours	Away colours

Persatuan Sepakbola Seluruh Asahan (simply known as PSSA) is an Indonesian football club based in Kisaran, Asahan Regency, North Sumatra. They played in Liga 4. After the 2018 season finished, they were absent from the Liga 3 competition for three consecutive seasons. however in their youth team, they are currently competing in the Soeratin Cup.

PSSA stadium named Mutiara Kisaran Stadium. Its location was in downtown Kisaran, Asahan Regency, North Sumatra.
