= Maha Vihara Maitreya =

Buddhist temple in Medan, North Sumatra, Indonesia

- The Great Maitreya Temple
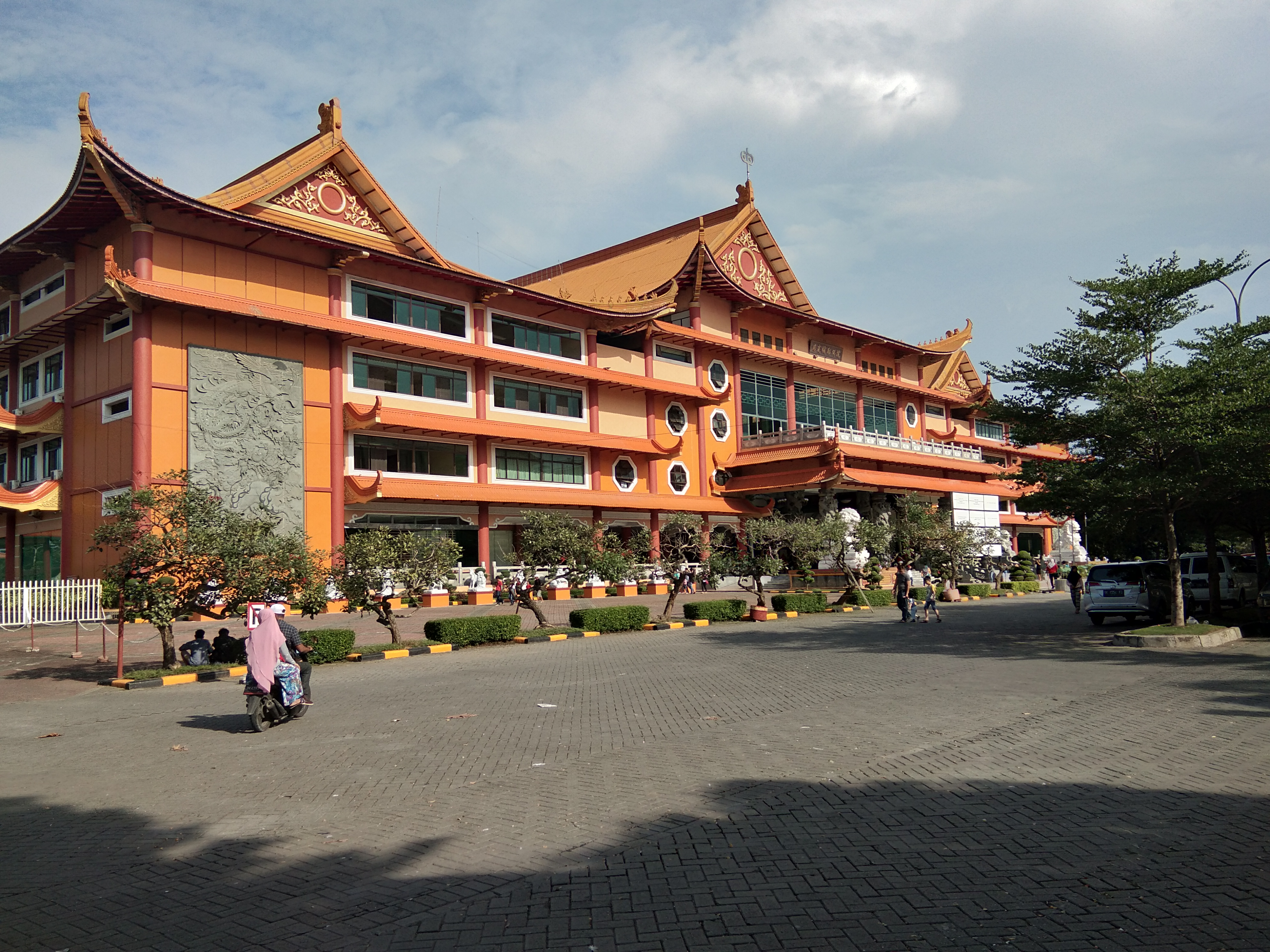
- Front view of the Temple

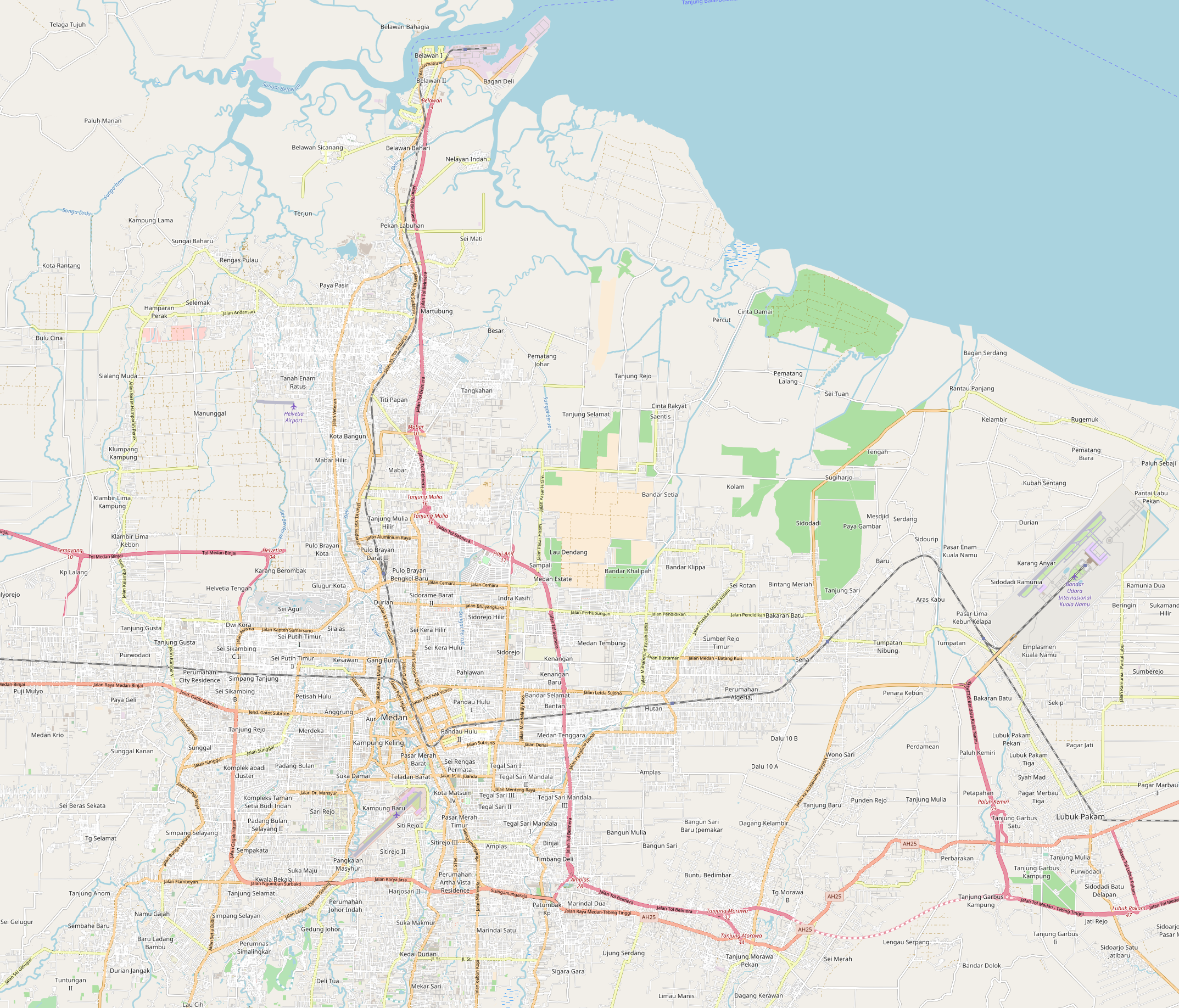
- Location in Medan, Northern Sumatra, Sumatra, and Indonesia Maha Vihara Maitreya (Northern Sumatra) Maha Vihara Maitreya (Sumatra) Maha Vihara Maitreya (Indonesia)

Religion
- Affiliation: Mahayana Buddhism
- Province: North Sumatra
- Region: Sumatra

Location
- Location: Komplek Perumahan Cemara Asri, Jalan Cemara Boulevard Utara No. 8, Medan Estate, Percut Sei Tuan, Deli Serdang Regency, North Sumatra 20371
- Country: Indonesia
- Interactive map of Maha Vihara Maitreya
- Territory: Deli Serdang Regency
- Coordinates: 3°38′16.5″N 98°42′04.7″E

Architecture
- Founder: Indonesia Buddhist Association
- Completed: 2008

Maha Vihara Maitreya is a Buddhist temple in Medan, North Sumatra, claimed to be the largest modern Buddhist temple in Indonesia. It is often called Vihara Cemara Asri because it is located in the housing complex of Cemara Asri. The temple was built in 1991 on an area of 4.5 hectares and was inaugurated on August 21, 2008.

== Overview ==
Maha Vihara Maitreya was built as a place of worship for Buddhists adherent in Medan in particular, and North Sumatra in general, given the large number of ethnic Chinese living in the city. In accordance with its name, Maitreya, this temple is thick with the teachings of Maitreya Buddha.

The temple is divided into three main sections. In the first there is a common Baktisala that is a place of worship of Buddha Sakyamuni, Bodhisattva and the Bodhisattva Satyakalama Avolokitesvara. The building has a capacity of 1,500 people. In the second building of the Maitreya Baktisala area with a capacity of 2,500 people. In this section there are also has Baktisala Holy Patriarch. There is also a banquet hall as a special dining room reception. The third is a meeting hall with a capacity of 2,000 people. All the buildings have a guesthouse, one of which has the additional facilities of office space, meeting rooms, recording studios and a communal kitchen.

The temple is decorated with various statues and reliefs of dragons and mythical animals. There is also a floating teapot fountain.

== See also ==
- Gunung Timur Temple
- Buddhism in Indonesia
