= Batang Kuis =

Coordinates: 3°37′10″N 98°48′40″E

Batang Kuis is a district or kecamatan in the Deli Serdang Regency in the Indonesian province of North Sumatra, with a land area of 44.64 km^{2}. As of the 2020 census, it had a population of 65,075; the official population estimate as at mid 2024 was 74,429 (comprising 37,548 males and 36,881 females). It is sub-divided into eleven rural villages (desa).

== Villages ==
The eleven villages (desa) are listed with their areas and their populations as at mid 2024, all sharing the postcode of 20372.

Kode Wilayah	Name of village	Area (km^{2})	Pop'n 2024 Estimate
12.07.27.2001	Sena	7.26	7,312
12.07.27.2002	Tumpatan Nibung	7.27	8,020
12.07.27.2004	Baru	5.15	8,506
12.07.27.2003	Tanjung Sari	3.30	13,855
12.07.27.2008	Bakaran Batu	0.57	3,365
12.07.27.2007	Bintang Meriah	1.46	7,125
12.07.27.2005	Batang Kuis Pekan	0.80	6,561
12.07.27.2009	Paya Gambar	2.94	5,248
12.07.27.2006	Sidodadi	10.53	5,177
12.07.27.2011	Sugiharjo	1.36	6,312
12.07.27.2010	Mesjid	3.98	1,948
Totals for	District	44.64	74,429
