= Namo Rambe =

Coordinates: 3°26′40″N 98°38′20″E

Namo Rambe (sometimes written as Namorambe) is an administrative district (kecamatan) situated immediately south of the city of Medan, in North Sumatra Province of Indonesia. It covers a land area of 62.30 km^{2}, and had a population of 36,651 at the 2010 Census and 39,697 at the 2020 Census; the official estimate as at mid 2024 was 43,248 - comprising 21,453 males and 21,795 females. It is administratively part of Deli Serdang Regency. The district is sub-divided into 36 villages (desa), all sharing the postcode of 20356. The most northern of these villages (and thereby the one immediately adjacent to Medan city) is Deli Tua, which has an area of 5.44 km^{2} and had a population of 12,146 in mid 2024 (i.e. over 28% of the district population); this village shares its name with the neighbouring Deli Tua District immediately to the east (which also includes a village called Deli Tua).

== Villages ==
The 36 villages are listed with their populations as at mid 2024.

Kode Wilayah	Name of village	Area in km^{2}	Pop'n 2024 Estimate
12.07.06.2001	Deli Tua	5.44	12,146
12.07.06.2002	Jati Kesuma	2.76	4,894
12.07.06.2003	Namo Rambe	3.89	1,985
12.07.06.2004	Gunung Kelawas	5.56	1,285
12.07.06.2005	Ujung Labuhen	1.87	3,289
12.07.06.2006	Lubang Ido	0.93	341
12.07.06.2007	Silue Lue	1.51	147
12.07.06.2008	Timbang Lawan	0.85	283
12.07.06.2009	Batu Mbelin	0.82	387
12.07.06.2010	Namo Batang	1.00	229
12.07.06.2011	Tanjung Selamat	1.72	205
12.07.06.2012	Bekukul	1.92	321
12.07.06.2013	Namo Pakam	1.76	268
12.07.06.2014	Suka Mulia Hilir	1.74	337
12.07.06.2015	Suka Mulia Hulu	0.60	383
12.07.06.2016	Rumah Mbacang	0.40	209
12.07.06.2017	Cinta Rakyat	1.21	200
12.07.06.2018	Batu Penjemuran	2.33	2,322

Kode Wilayah	Name of village	Area in km^{2}	Pop'n 2024 Estimate
12.07.06.2019	Kuta Tengah	1.14	991
12.07.06.2020	Namo Landur	1.18	723
12.07.06.2021	Gunung Berita	0.71	408
12.07.06.2022	Tangkahan	2.45	887
12.07.06.2023	Uruk Gedang	1.57	398
12.07.06.2024	Rumah Keben	1.60	614
12.07.06.2025	Namo Pinang	1.71	569
12.07.06.2026	Sudi Rejo	1.10	3,260
12.07.06.2027	Jaba	1.18	1,306
12.07.06.2028	Kuta Tualah	1.29	1,128
12.07.06.2029	Kuala Simeme	0.48	473
12.07.06.2030	Batu Gemuk	2.19	581
12.07.06.2031	Lau Mulgap	1.47	235
12.07.06.2032	Batu Rejo	0.70	552
12.07.06.2033	Salang Tungir	1.69	303
12.07.06.2034	Namo Mbaru	2.13	267
12.07.06.2035	Rimo Mungcur	1.64	369
12.07.06.2036	Namo Mbelin	1.76	953
