= Kutalimbaru =

Coordinates: 3°27′23″N 98°32′50″E

Kutalimbaru is a district or kecamatan in the Deli Serdang Regency in the Indonesian province of North Sumatra. As of the 2020 census, it had a population of 36,238 and an area of 178.81 km^{2}; the official estimate as at mid 2024 was 40,893.

== Villages ==
The fourteen villages are listed with their populations as at mid 2024, all sharing the postcode of 20354.

- 12.07.04.2001 Suka Makmur (2,233)
- 12.07.04.2002 Namo Mirik (1,507)
- 12.07.04.2003 Suka Dame (2,980)
- 12.07.04.2004 Pasar X (2,419)
- 12.07.04.2005 Perpanden (2,376)
- 12.07.04.2006 Kutalimbaru (village) (2,306)
- 12.07.04.2007 Sampe Cita (3,243)
- 12.07.04.2008 Suka Rende (3,217)
- 12.07.04.2009 Kwala Lau Bicik (1,430)
- 12.07.04.2010 Lau Bakeri (4,543)
- 12.07.04.2011 Silebo Lebo (2,517)
- 12.07.04.2012 Sawit Rejo (3,648)
- 12.07.04.2013 Namo Rube Julu (1,731)
- 12.07.04.2014 Sei Mencirim (6,743)
