= Victory Dairi F.C. =

Indonesian football club

Victory Dairi
- Full name: Victory Dairi Football Club
- Nickname: Kopi Sidikalang
- Short name: VD
- Founded: 13 September 2007; 18 years ago
- Ground: Panji Bako Stadium; Sidikalang
- Capacity: 1,000
- Owner: PSSI Dairi Regency
- Manager: Batara Sinaga
- Coach: Eben Siregar
- League: Liga 4
- 2024–25: 1st (North Sumatra Zone); First round, 3rd in Group H (National phase)
Home colours

Victory Dairi Football Club is an Indonesian football club based in Dairi Regency, North Sumatra. They currently compete in the Liga 4 North Sumatra zone. Their homebase is Panji Bako Stadium.

== Honours ==
- Liga 4 North Sumatra
  - Champion (1): 2024–25
