= Mutiara Kisaran Stadium =

Stadium in Kisaran, Indonesia

- Location in Northern Sumatra
- Location: Kisaran, Asahan Regency, Indonesia
- Coordinates: 2.980791°N 99.639656°E
- Owner: Regency Government of Asahan
- Operator: Regency Government of Asahan
- Capacity: 5,000
- Surface: Grass field

Tenants
- PSSA Asahan; PS Bintang Jaya Asahan

Mutiara Kisaran Stadium is a multi-purpose stadium in the town of Kisaran, Indonesia. It is currently used mostly for football matches. The stadium has a capacity of 5,000 people.

It is the home base of PSSA Asahan and PS Bintang Jaya Asahan.
