= Pancur Batu =

Pancur Batu is a district or kecamatan in the Deli Serdang Regency in the Indonesian province of North Sumatra. As of the 2020 census, it had a population of 93,470 and an area of 122.53 km^{2}; the official estimate as at mid 2024 was 101,515.

== Villages ==
The 25 villages are listed with their areas and their populations as at mid 2024, all sharing the postcode of 20353.

Kode Wilayah	Name of village	Area (km^{2})	Pop'n 2024 Estimate
12.07.03.2001	Bintang Meriah	6.99	1,406
12.07.03.2002	Sugau	4.19	1,408
12.07.03.2003	Tiang Layar	4.15	1,558
12.07.03.2009	Salam Tani	9.74	1,629
12.07.03.2005	Namo Riam	5.15	2,071
12.07.03.2004	Durin Simbelang A	3.41	3,153
12.07.03.2006	Durin Tingal	9.11	3,923
12.07.03.2008	Pertampilen	3.97	1,997
12.07.03.2007	Hulu	2.14	4,491
12.07.03.2011	Namo Simpur	2.19	1,709
12.07.03.2013	Namo Bintang	4.99	6,915
12.07.03.2012	Simalingkar A	7.40	3,416
12.07.03.2025	Perumnas Simalingkar	10.42	6,450
12.07.03.2024	Baru	2.72	7,308
12.07.03.2014	Lama	1.16	5,642
12.07.03.2010	Kampung Tengah	1.15	2,426
12.07.03.2015	Namorih	8.00	1,860
Sub-totals for	Southern group	65.90	57,372

Kode Wilayah	Name of village	Area (km^{2})	Pop'n 2024 Estimate
12.07.03.2019	Durian Jangak	4.91	1,789
12.07.03.2018	Tuntungan II	3.90	6,160
12.07.03.2016	Tuntungan I	15.55	4,193
12.07.03.2017	Gunung Tinggi	15.60	2,158
12.07.03.2022	Sei Gelugur	4.27	7,609
12.07.03.2023	Suka Raya	3.59	5,029
12.07.03.2021	Tanjung Anom	5.24	12,685
12.07.03.2020	Sembahe Baru	3.57	4,520
Sub-totals for	Northwestern group	56.63	44,143
Totals for	District	122.53	101,515

The eight desa listed in the right-hand column are situated to the northwest of the rest of the district.
