= Labura Hebat F.C. =

Indonesian football club

Labura Hebat
- Full name: Labuhanbatu Utara Hebat Football Club
- Nickname: Baung Kuning (The Yellow Catfish)
- Founded: 27 January 2022; 4 years ago
- Ground: Porku Stadium; North Labuhanbatu, North Sumatra
- Owner: PSSI North Labuhanbatu
- Manager: Dedi Irawan
- Coach: Amran
- League: Liga 3
- 2023–24: 1st, (North Sumatra zone); Round of 32, (National)
Home colours	Away colours

Labuhanbatu Utara Hebat Football Club, commonly known as Labura Hebat, is an Indonesian football club based in North Labuhanbatu Regency, North Sumatra. They currently compete in the Liga 3 North Sumatra zone.

== Honours ==
- Liga 3 North Sumatra
  - Champion (1): 2023–24
- Union Pangdam I/BB Cup
  - Champion (1): 2023
