= PS Paya Bakung United =

Indonesian football club

- Full name: Persatuan Sepakbola Paya Bakung United
- Nickname: Laskar Sungai Aran Dalu
- Short name: PBU
- Founded: 2018; 8 years ago
- Ground: Paya Bakung Field; Hamparan Perak, Deli Serdang, North Sumatra
- Owner: PSSI Deli Serdang
- Manager: Sumiyono
- Coach: Dedi Kurniawan
- League: Liga 4
- 2025–26: 1st (North Sumatra zone); 4th in Group B, First round (National phase)
| Home colours | Away colours |

Persatuan Sepakbola Paya Bakung United (simply known as PS Paya Bakung United or PBU) is an Indonesian football club based in Hamparan Perak, Deli Serdang, North Sumatra. They currently compete in the Liga 4 and their homeground is Paya Bakung Field.

== Honours ==
- Liga 4 North Sumatra
  - Champion (1): 2025–26
