= Poslab Labuhanbatu =

Indonesian football club

Poslab
- Full name: Persatuan Olahraga Sepakbola Labuhanbatu
- Nickname: Tengku Raden Warriors
- Founded: 1952; 74 years ago
- Ground: Binaraga Stadium; Labuhanbatu, North Sumatra
- Capacity: 500
- Owner: Askab PSSI Labuhan Batu
- Chairman: Asrol Aziz Lubis
- Manager: Asrul Kurniawan Harahap
- Coach: Muhammad Sukma
- League: Liga 4
- 2021: Quarter-finals, (North Sumatra zone)
| Home colours | Away colours |

Persatuan Olahraga Sepakbola Labuhanbatu (simply known as Poslab) is an Indonesian football club based in Labuhanbatu Regency, North Sumatra. They currently compete in the Liga 4 North Sumatra.
