= Kisaran =

Kisaran كيسارن
- Capital of Regency
- Nickname: Kota Kerang (Scallops City)
- Location in Sumatra and Indonesia Kisaran (Indonesia)
- Coordinates: 2°59′00″N 99°36′45″E
- Country: Indonesia
- Province: North Sumatra
- Regency: Asahan

Area
  - Total: 62.97 km^{2} (24.31 sq mi)
- Elevation: 9–25 m (30–82 ft)

Population (mid 2025 estimate)
  - Total: 151,492
  - Density: 2,406/km^{2} (6,231/sq mi)
- Time zone: UTC+7 (IWST)
- Area code: (+62)23
- Vehicle registration: BK
- Website: Asahan Official Site

Kisaran is a large town in the North Sumatra province of Indonesia. Kisaran is the administrative capital of Asahan Regency. Kisaran does not now have the status of an independent city, but is composed of two administrative districts (kecamatan) - West Kisaran District and East Kisaran District. Kisaran is situated on the Trans-Sumatra Highway, and is also located in the path of trains in northern Sumatra.

The previous status of Kisaran was an administrative city, independent of the regency, which was then abolished and divided into two districts within the regency in 2003 because it did not meet the increasing requirements of the autonomous region.

== Government ==
Kisaran has an area of 62.98 km^{2}, and is divided into two districts (East Kisaran, or Kisaran Timur, with 88,391 inhabitants in 2025; and West Kisaran, or Kisaran Barat, with 63,101 inhabitants in 2025). These are in turn divided into 25 Urban Villages (kelurahan), listed below with their populations at the 2020 Census and as officially estimated for mid 2024.

Urban Villages (kelurahan) of Kisaran City
| No | Village (kelurahan) | District (kecamatan) | Pop'n 2020 Census | Pop'n 2024 Estimate |
|---|---|---|---|---|
| 1 | Kisaran Naga | East Kisaran | 6,471 | 6,573 |
| 2 | Kisaran Timur | East Kisaran | 3,142 | 3,130 |
| 3 | Sentang | East Kisaran | 10,069 | 10,364 |
| 4 | Kedai Ledang | East Kisaran | 5,220 | 5,511 |
| 5 | Teladan | East Kisaran | 5,956 | 6,500 |
| 6 | Mutiara | East Kisaran | 9,752 | 11,261 |
| 7 | Siumbut Umbut | East Kisaran | 7,823 | 8,527 |
| 8 | Siumbut Baru | East Kisaran | 6,668 | 7,930 |
| 9 | Gambir Baru | East Kisaran | 5,889 | 5,946 |
| 10 | Karang Anyer | East Kisaran | 4,247 | 4,438 |
| 11 | Lestari | East Kisaran | 8,606 | 8,316 |
| 12 | Selawan | East Kisaran | 7,466 | 7,789 |
| 13 | Bunut | West Kisaran | 2,744 | 2,615 |
| 14 | Bunut Barat | West Kisaran | 6,359 | 6,675 |
| 15 | Sidodadi | West Kisaran | 3,331 | 6,116 |
| 16 | Sidomukti | West Kisaran | 6,258 | 6,431 |
| 17 | Mekar Baru | West Kisaran | 3,516 | 3,427 |
| 18 | Tebing Kisaran | West Kisaran | 4,085 | 4,061 |
| 19 | Kisaran Baru | West Kisaran | 5,532 | 5,427 |
| 20 | Kisaran Kota | West Kisaran | 2,949 | 2,748 |
| 21 | Sei Renggas | West Kisaran | 6,310 | 5,977 |
| 22 | Dadimulyo | West Kisaran | 4,672 | 4,968 |
| 23 | Tegal Sari | West Kisaran | 3,382 | 6,310 |
| 24 | Sendang Sari | West Kisaran | 5,631 | 5,671 |
| 25 | Kisaran Barat | West Kisaran | 3,659 | 3,422 |

== Demographics ==
=== Religion ===
Based on data from BPS in 2017, 82.42 percent of the population of Kisaran embraced Islam. The rest are Protestants, Buddhists, Catholics, Hindus and a small number of Confucians.

Religion in Kisaran
| Religion | Percent |
| Islam | 82.42% |
| Protestantism | 11.55% |
| Buddhism | 4.35% |
| Catholicism | 1.58% |
| Hinduism | 0.09% |
| Confucianism | 0.01% |

=== Ethnic ===
BPS data of 2017 noted that the plurality of the population in Kisaran is Javanese (38.01%), followed by Malay (25.69%), Batak 23.88%, Chinese 7.27%, and other ethnic groups (5.15%).

Ethnic in Kisaran
| Ethnic | Percent |
| Javanese | 38.01% |
| Malay | 25.69% |
| Batak | 23.88% |
| Chinese | 7.27% |
| Other | 5.15% |

== Transportation ==
- Kisaran Railways Station
- Motorcycle Rickshaws
- Online Motorbike Taxi

== Notable people ==
- Sisworo Gautama Putra
- Sindoedarmo Sudjojono
