= Gunungsitoli Khoda F.C. =

Indonesian football club

Gunungsitoli Khoda
- Full name: Gunungsitoli Khoda Football Club
- Nickname: Magiao (Nias hill myna)
- Short name: GKFC
- Founded: 2022; 4 years ago
- Ground: Pelita Field; Gunungsitoli
- Owner: Duhuasa Telaumbanua
- Chairman: Maju Ferry Hutagalung
- Manager: Atur Krisman Jaya Harefa
- League: Liga 4
Home colours

Gunungsitoli Khoda Football Club is an Indonesian football club based in Gunungsitoli City, Nias Island, North Sumatra. They currently compete in the Liga 4 North Sumatra zone and their homeground is Pelita Field.
