= PS PTPN III =

Indonesian football club

- Full name: Persatuan Sepakbola PT Perkebunan Nusantara III
- Nickname: The Planters
- Ground: Janji Kebun Field
- Capacity: 500
- Owner: PT. Perkebunan Nusantara III
- Coach: Wijay
- League: Liga 4
- 2023–24: 2nd, (North Sumatra zone); 3rd in Group D, (National)
Home colours	Away colours

Persatuan Sepakbola PT. Perkebunan Nusantara III, often abbreviated to PS PTPN III, is an Indonesian football club based in Rantau Prapat, Labuhanbatu Regency, North Sumatra. They currently compete in the Liga 4 North Sumatra zone.
