= Asahan Regency =

Regency in North Sumatra, Indonesia

Coordinates: 3°N 99.1667°E

Asahan Regency Kabupaten Asahan
- Regency

Other transcription(s)
  - Jawi: كابوفاتن اسهن
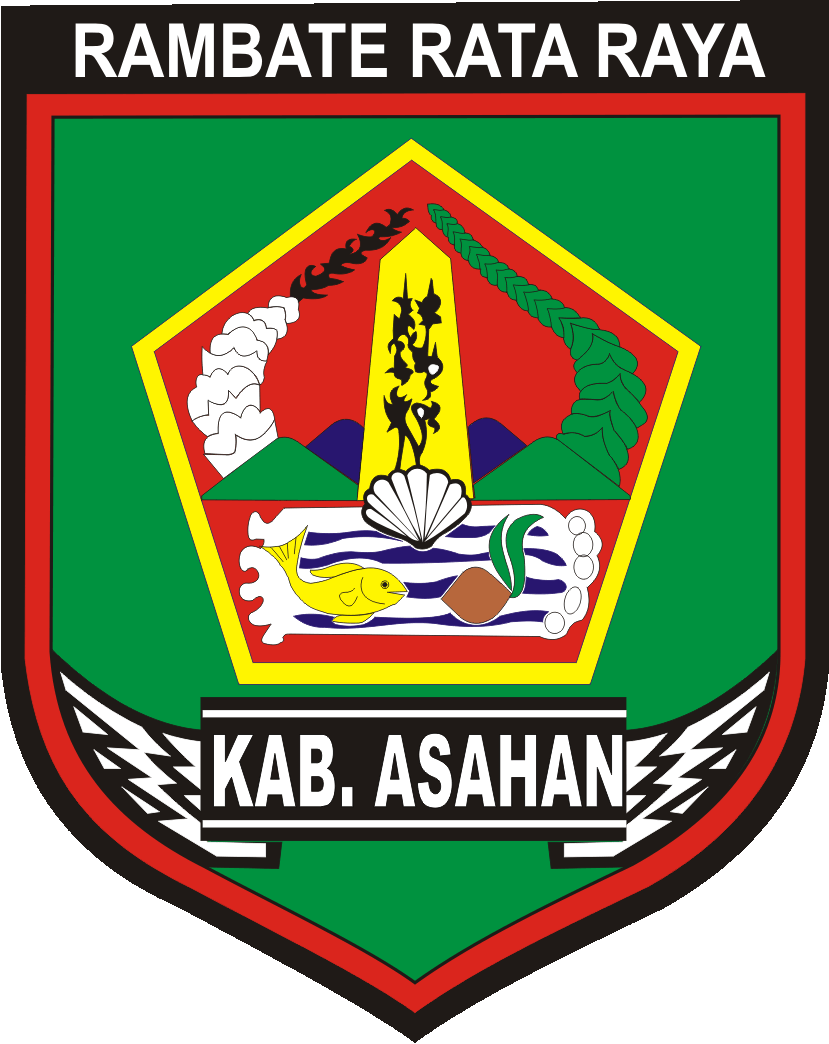
- Coat of arms
- Motto: Rambate Rata Raya (Working together for the prosperity of the people)
- Country: Indonesia
- Province: North Sumatra
- Regency seat: Kisaran

Government
  - Regent: Taufik Zainal Abidin
  - Vice Regent: Rianto
  - Chairman of Council of Representatives: Baharuddin Harahap (Gerindra)
  - Vice Chairmen of Council of Representatives: Benteng Panjaitan (Golkar), Rosmansyah (PDI-P) and Ilham Harahap (Partai Demokrat)

Area
  - Total: 3,732.97 km^{2} (1,441.31 sq mi)

Population (mid 2025 estimate)
  - Total: 824,597
  - Density: 220.896/km^{2} (572.117/sq mi)
- Time zone: UTC+7 (WIB)
- Area code: (+62) 623
- Vehicle registration: BK
- Website: www.asahankab.go.id

Asahan Regency is a regency in North Sumatra Province of Indonesia. Following the creation of the new Batubara Regency (which was carved out of the more western of the coastal districts of Asahan Regency on 15 June 2007), the regency now covers an area of 3,732.97 square kilometres; it had a population of 668,272 according to the 2010 census and 769,960 in the 2020 Census; the official estimate as of mid 2025 was 824,597 (comprising 416,498 males and 408,099 females). Its administrative centre is now the large town of Kisaran. The Regency surrounds but now does not include the city of Tanjungbalai which was its capital until created an independent city in 1984. The Asahan Sultanate was located in the region.

== History ==
The Sultanate of Asahan (كسلطانن اسهن) was a Malay sultanate from approximately 1630 until 1946. It was located in the north-east of the island of Sumatra (in what is now Indonesia) and covered what is now the Asahan Regency. The population consists of Simalungun and Toba Batak people who have converted to Islam and speak the Malay language. Some others still recognize the Bataks but are Muslim, known as Pardembanan Batak people, who speak the Pardembanan Batak language.

== Administrative divisions ==
The regency is divided administratively into twenty-five Districts (kecamatan), tabulated below with their areas and their populations at the 2010 Census and the 2020 Census, together with the official estimates as of mid 2025. The table also includes the locations of the district administrative centres, the number of administrative villages in each district (totaling 177 rural desa and 27 urban kelurahan - of which 25 are in the town of Kisaran), and its postal code.

== Gallery ==
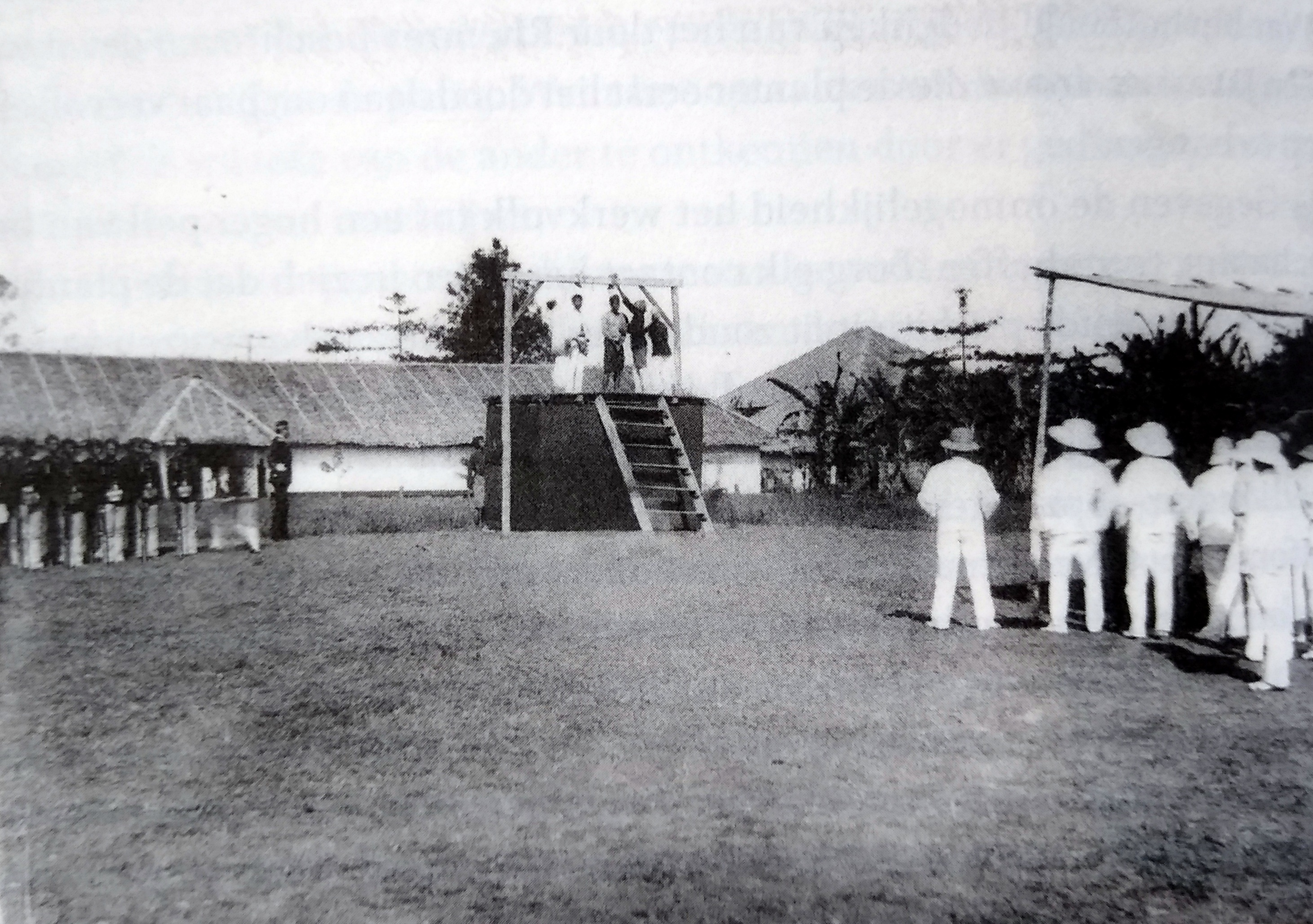
Execution in Asahan, Dutch East Indies, 1893

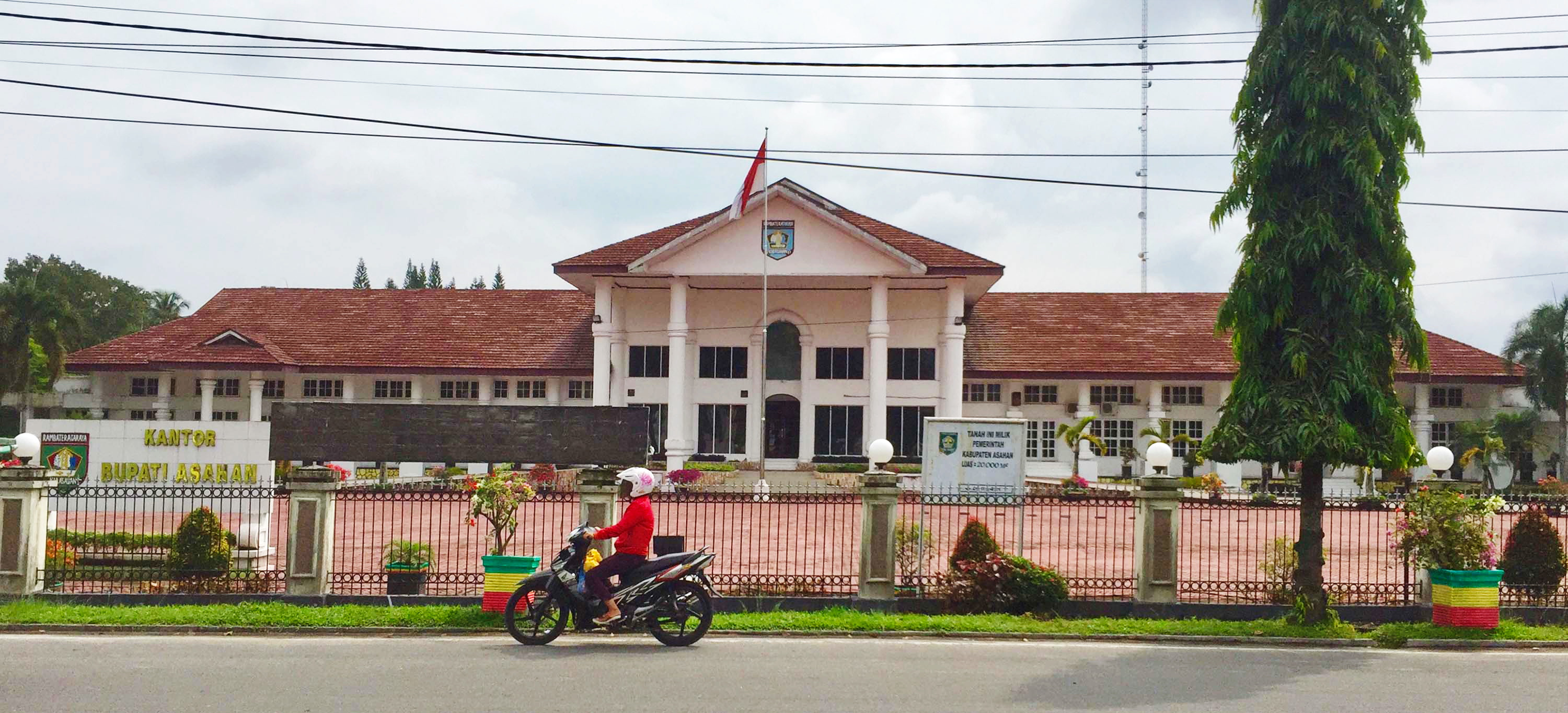
Office of the Asahan Regency, foto 2019

Kode Wilayah	Name of District (kecamatan)	Area in km^{2}	Pop'n Census 2010	Pop'n Census 2020	Pop'n Estimate mid 2025	Admin centre	No. of villages	Post code
12.09.17	Bandar Pasir Mandoge	713.63	32,845	34,997	36,063	Bandar Pasir Mandoge	9	21262
12.09.15	Bandar Pulau	268.41	20,508	23,684	25,375	Bandar Pulau Pekan	10	21275
12.09.21	Aek Songsongan	282.21	16,485	17,970	18,722	Aek Songsongan	9	21274
12.09.22	Rahuning	195.80	17,509	19,940	21,220	Rahuning I	7	21276
12.09.14	Pulau Rakyat	213.65	31,534	35,454	37,495	Pulau Rakyat Pekan	12	21278
12.09.18	Aek Kuasan	143.13	22,847	25,742	27,252	Aek Loba Afdeling I	7 ^{(a)}	21273
12.09.32	Aek Ledong	85.12	19,694	20,632	21,087	Ledong Barat	7	21277
12.09.11	Sei Kepayang	370.69	17,106	19,306	20,455	Sei Kepayang Kanan	6	21381
12.09.24	Sei Kepayang Barat (West Sei Kepayang)	49.19	12,825	14,906	16,019	Sei Tulang Pandau	6	21382
12.09.25	Sei Kepayang Timur (East Sei Kepayang)	100.65	8,601	9,561	10,056	Sungai Pasir	5	21383
12.09.10	Tanjung Balai ^{(b)}	88.68	34,901	41,444	45,005	Asahan Mati	8	21352
12.09.12	Simpang Empat	135.77	39,444	46,642	50,546	Simpang Empat	8	21271
12.09.31	Teluk Dalam	117.01	17,280	19,243	20,257	Air Teluk Kiri	6	21270
12.09.13	Air Batu	117.15	39,151	45,868	49,485	Sungai Alim Ulu	12	21272
12.09.23	Sei Dadap	82.78	30,871	36,122	38,947	Sei Kamah II	10	21279
12.09.16	Buntu Pane	153.40	22,538	24,671	25,756	Sei Silau Timur	9	21261
12.09.26	Tinggi Raja	107.90	18,100	20,056	21,062	Padang Sari	7	21261
12.09.27	Setia Janji	63.37	11,442	12,784	13,479	Sei Silau Barat	5	21260
12.09.08	Meranti	45.33	19,381	23,508	25,791	Meranti	7	21264
12.09.30	Pulo Bandring	86.99	27,744	33,469	36,623	Suka Damai	10	21265
12.09.29	Rawang Panca Arga	67.37	17,533	19,947	21,216	Rawang Pasar IV	7	21266
12.09.09	Air Joman	98.09	45,811	57,127	63,521	Binjai Serbangan	7 ^{(c)}	21263
12.09.28	Silau Laut	84.68	20,166	24,972	27,673	Silau Bonto	5	21267
12.09.19	Kota Kisaran Barat (West Kisaran town)	32.81	55,175	60,428	63,101	Sei Renggas	13 ^{(d)}	21211 -21218
12.09.20	Kota Kisaran Timur (East Kisaran town)	30.17	68,781	81,487	88,391	Kisaran Naga	12 ^{(e)}	21219 -21229
	Totals	3,732.97	668,272	769,960	824,597	Kisaran	204	

Note: (a) including one kelurahan - Aek Loba Pekan, with 6,344 inhabitants as at mid 2024.
(b) Tanjung Balai District is not part of Tanjungbalai city, but lies between the city and the coast.
(c) including one kelurahan - Binjai Serbangan, with 19,535 inhabitants as at mid 2024.
(d) comprises 13 kelurahan - see under Kisaran for populations of kelurahan.
(e) comprises 12 kelurahan - see under Kisaran for populations of kelurahan.
