= PS Kwarta Deli Serdang =

Indonesian football club

Kwarta Deli Serdang
- Full name: Persatuan Sepakbola Kwarta Deli Serdang
- Nickname: Burung Sumatera (Sumatran Birds)
- Founded: 2001; 25 years ago
- Ground: Kwarta Academy Football Field; Percut Sei Tuan, Deli Serdang
- Capacity: 1,000
- Owner: PSSI Deli Serdang
- Chairman: Adrian Achmad Gho
- Manager: M. Arief Fadhillah
- Coach: Irwansyah Panjaitan
- League: Liga 4
- 2024–25: 2nd (North Sumatra Zone); Second round, 4th in Group S (National phase)
Home colours	Away colours

Persatuan Sepakbola Kwarta Deli Serdang, commonly known as PS Kwarta, is an Indonesian football club based in Deli Serdang, North Sumatra. They play in Liga 4. Their home ground is Kwarta Academy Football Field.

== Players ==
=== Current squad ===
Note: Flags indicate national team as defined under FIFA eligibility rules; some limited exceptions apply. Players may hold more than one non-FIFA nationality.

No.	Pos.	Nation	Player
—	GK	IDN	Racmad Hadi
—	DF	IDN	Iwang Pramudya
—	DF	IDN	Ikbal Dalimunthe
—	FW	IDN	Syaifullah Damanik
—	DF	IDN	Deva Ilham
—	MF	IDN	Rayhan Andanti
—	DF	IDN	Bayu Prasetyo
—	DF	IDN	Ardiansyah Siregar
—	MF	IDN	Andrio Tampubolon
—	FW	IDN	Bayu Tri Sanjaya
—	MF	IDN	Angga Abriyanda
—	DF	IDN	Ragil Fahrezi
—	DF	IDN	Muhammad Reza
—	DF	IDN	Khairul Siregar

== Coaching staff ==
Position	Name
Head coach	(Indonesia) Irwansyah Panjaitan
Assistant coach	(Indonesia) Budi Pranoto
Goalkeeper coach	(Indonesia) Deli Sulistia

== Honours ==
- Liga Indonesia First Division
  - Champion (1): 2013
- Liga 4 North Sumatra
  - Runner-up (1): 2025–26
