= Deli Serdang Regency =

Regency in North Sumatra, Indonesia

Coordinates: 3°33′N 98°51′E

Deli Serdang Regency Kabupaten Deli Serdang
- Regency

Other transcription(s)
  - Jawi: دلي سردڠ
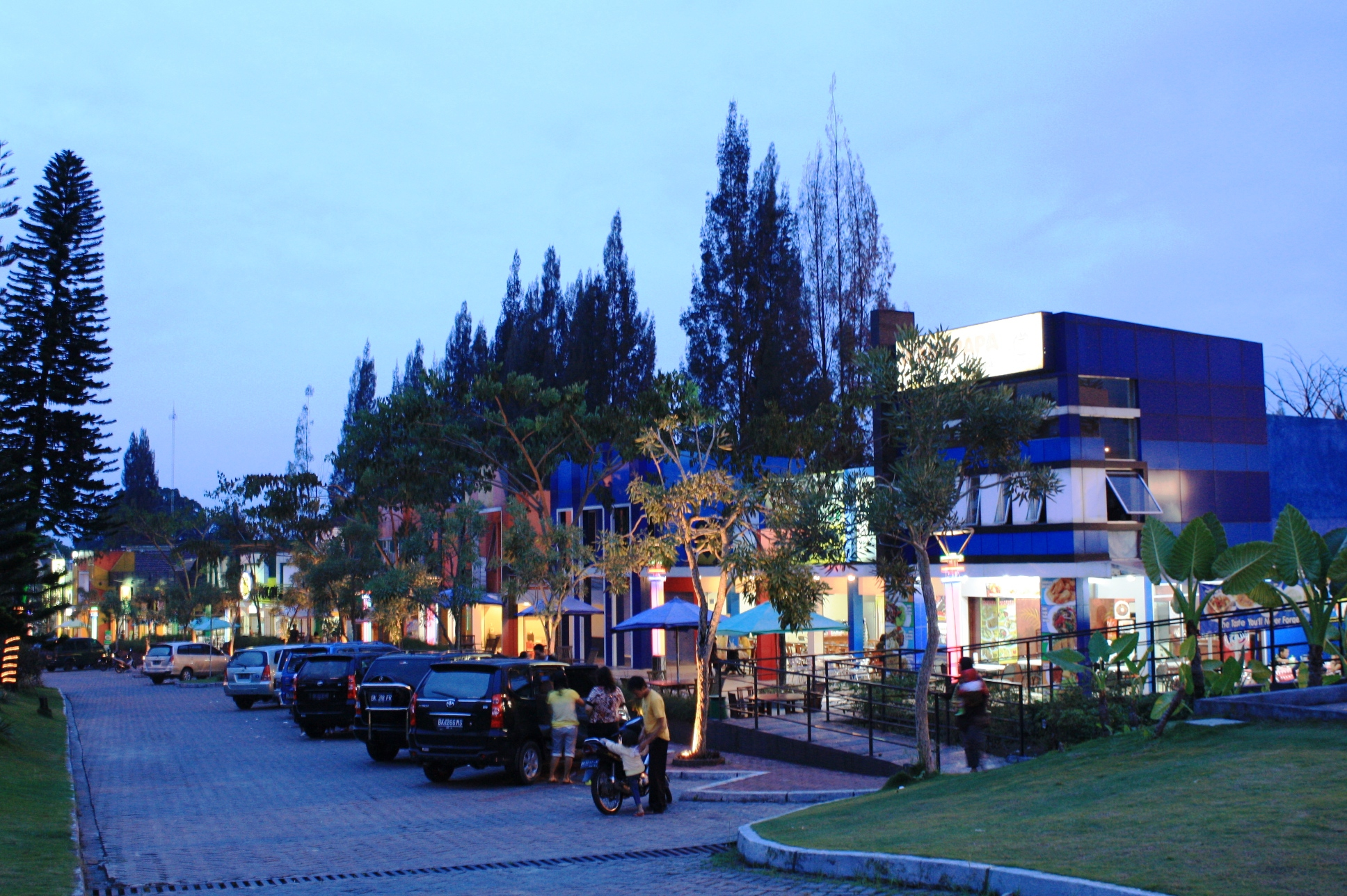
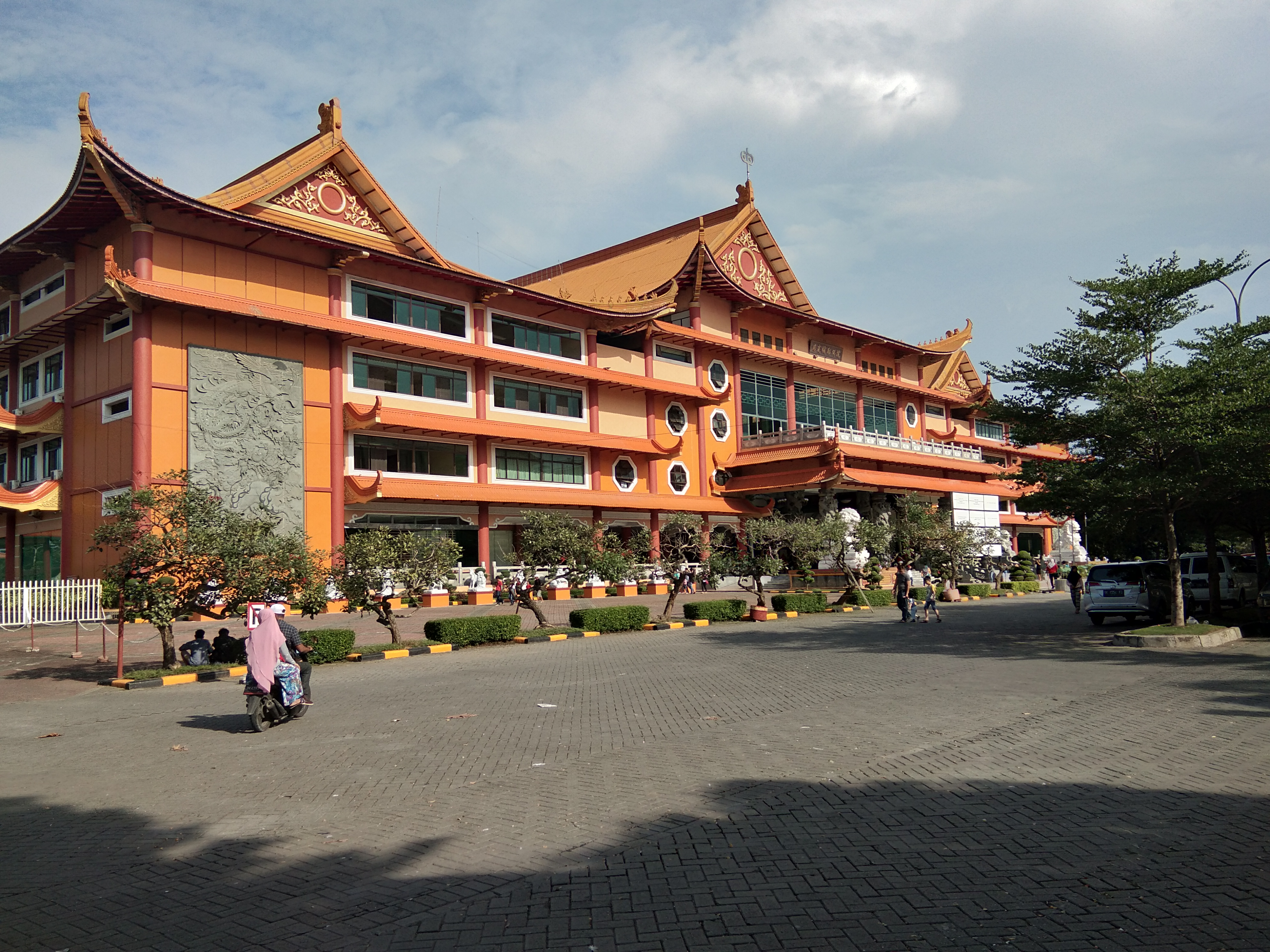
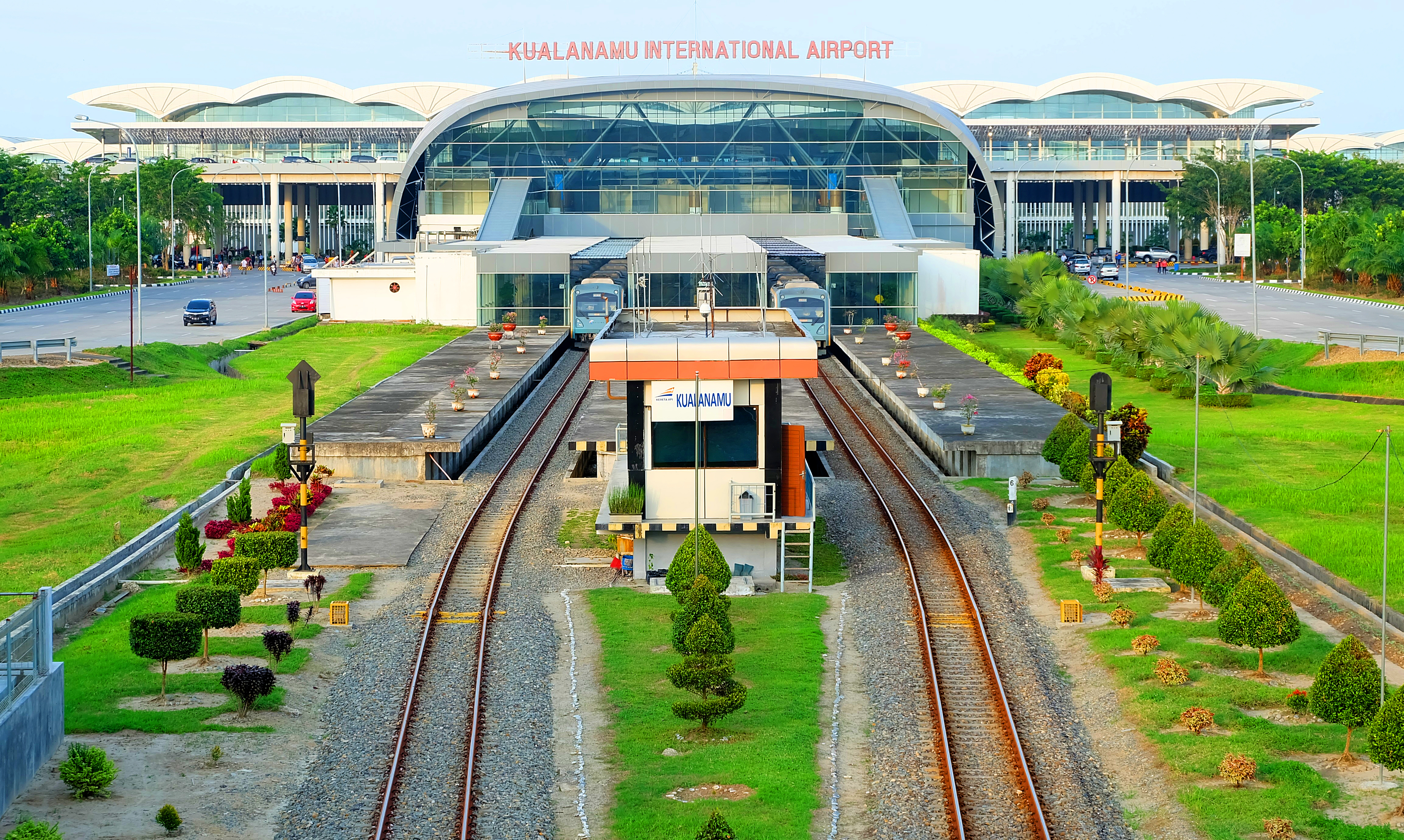
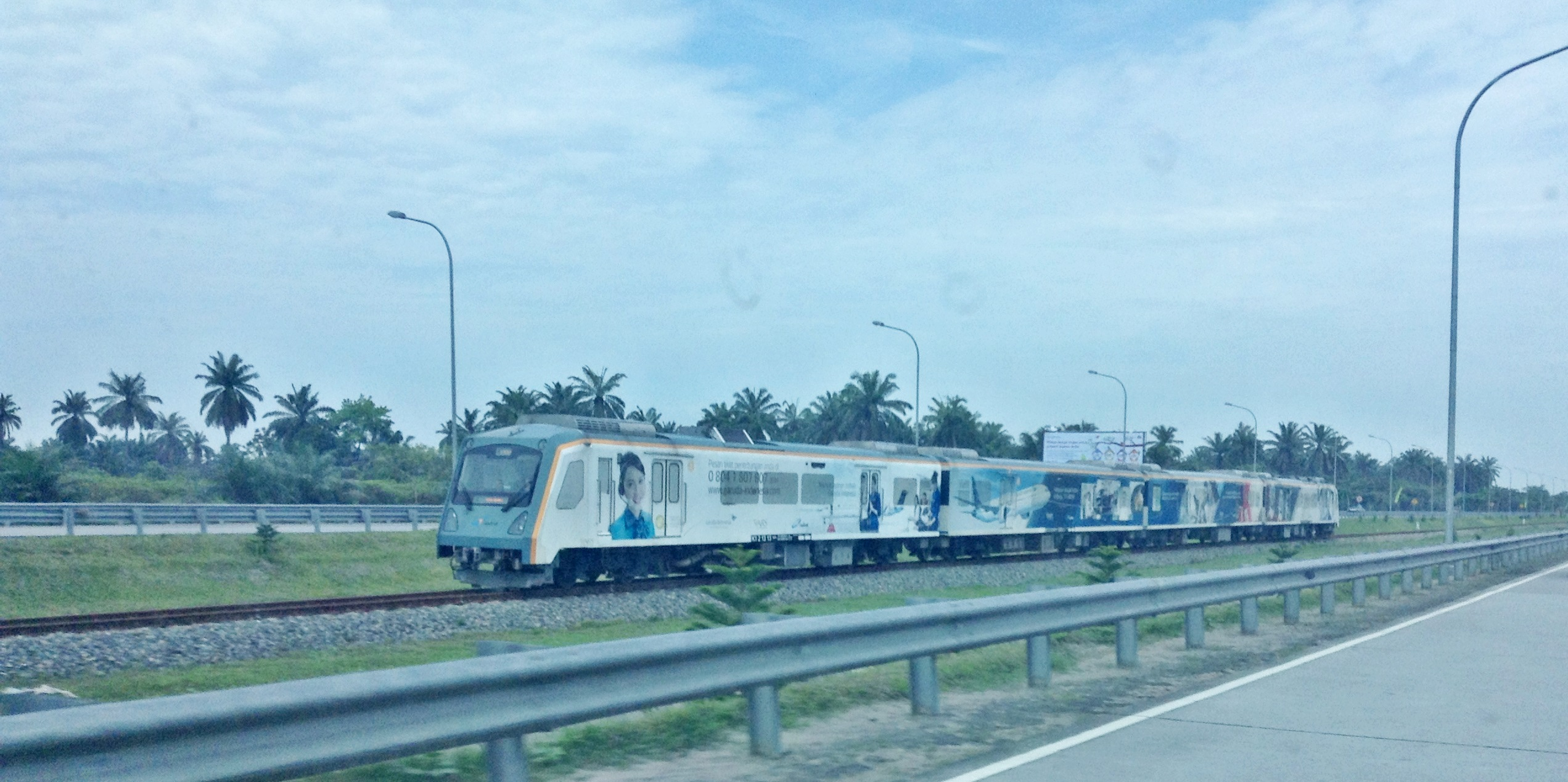
- Sibolangit Maha Vihara Maitreya Kualanamu International Airport Airport Rail Link

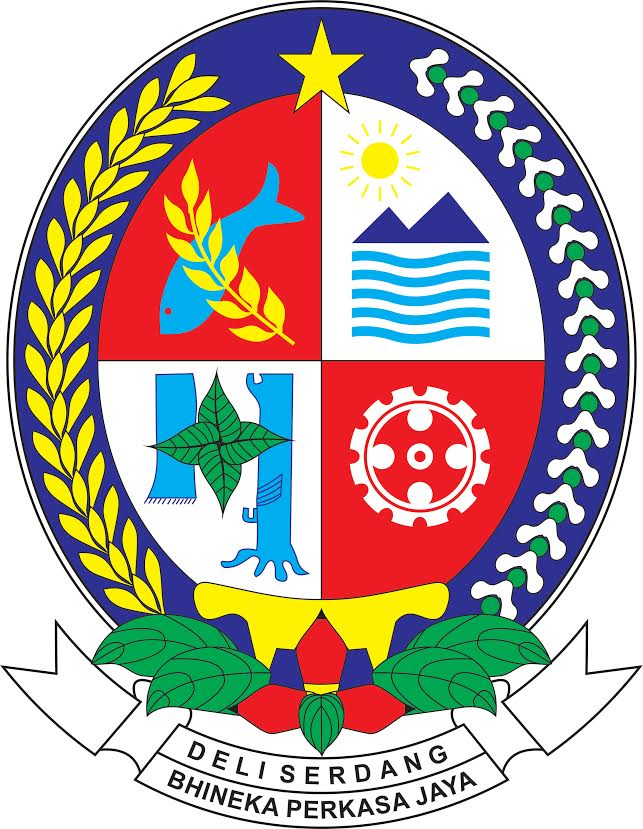
- Seal
- Motto: Bhinneka Perkasa Jaya ("Diversely Powerful and Glorious")
- Country: Indonesia
- Province: North Sumatra
- Regency seat: Lubuk Pakam

Government
  - Regent: Asri Ludin Tambunan
  - Vice Regent: Lom Lom Suwondo
  - Chairman of Council of Representatives: Zakky Shahri (Gerindra)
  - Vice Chairmen of Council of Representatives: Amit Damanik (PDI-P), Tengku Ahmad Tala'a (Golkar) and Nusantara Tarigan (Nasdem)

Area
  - Total: 2,579.98 km^{2} (996.14 sq mi)

Population (mid 2025 estimate)
  - Total: 2,078,046
  - Density: 805.450/km^{2} (2,086.11/sq mi)
- Time zone: UTC+7 (WIB)
- Website: www.deliserdang.go.id

Deli Serdang Regency (Indonesian: Kabupaten Deli Serdang; Jawi: دلي سردڠ) is a regency in the Indonesian province of North Sumatra. It surrounds the city of Medan, and also borders to the west the city of Binjai, which is effectively a bedroom community for Medan. The entire regency lies within the Medan metropolitan area. It occupies an area of 2,579.98 km^{2} (906.14 sq miles). Its administrative center is Lubuk Pakam, which is located approximately 30 km east of Medan. The national census of 2000 recorded 1,573,987 people, but by 2010 the regency's population increased by 13.76% to 1,790,431, and at the 2020 Census the total was 1,931,441. The official estimate as of mid-2025 was 2,078,046 (comprising 1,044,002 males and 1,034,044 females), of whom 65.1% lived in the western 53.6% of the area, surrounding Medan city, while 34.9% lived in the eastern 46.4% of the area. Medan's Kualanamu International Airport is located in this regency, 23 kilometres (14 mi) east of downtown Medan.

Deli Serdang is the most populous regency in Indonesia outside the island of Java, with 2,078,046 inhabitants in mid 2025. Its population is comparable to the U.S state of Nebraska.

== Neighbouring areas ==
The external boundaries of the regency are with:

- To the north: the Langkat Regency and the Strait of Malacca.
- To the south: the Karo Regency and Simalungun Regency.
- To the east: the Serdang Bedagai Regency and the Strait of Malacca.
- To the west: the Karo Regency, Langkat Regency and the city of Binjai.

The major city of Medan is a semi-enclave within the regency (except in the north, where the city reaches the Malacca Strait at Belawan).

== Administrative districts ==
The regency is divided into twenty-two districts (kecamatan), tabulated below with their areas (in km^{2}) and their 2010 Census and 2020 Census populations, and the official estimates as of mid-2025. For convenience, the districts are grouped below into two geographical halfs - a western half containing suburbs of Medan, and an eastern half centred on Tanjung Morawa; the western half can more easily by grouped into three areas - (i) the eastern suburbs of Medan, essentially Percut Sei Tuan District, (ii) the western suburbs of Medan, essentially Hamparan Perak and Sunggal Districts, and (iii) the southern suburbs and rural areas further south. The table also includes the locations of the district administrative centres, the number of administrative villages within each district (totaling 380 rural desa, and 14 urban kelurahan), and its post code:

Kode Wilayah	Name of District (kecamatan)	Area in km^{2}	Pop'n Census 2010	Pop'n Census 2020	Pop'n Estimate mid 2025	Admin centre	No. of desa	No. of kelu- rahan	Post code
12.07.21	Patumbak	43.54	88,961	97,994	104.395	Patumbak	8	-	20361
12.07.22	Deli Tua	8.14	60,624	59,292	63,629	Deli Tua	3	3 ^{(a)}	20355
12.07.23	Sunggal	80.09	244,187	241,359	258,629	Sunggal	17	-	20351
12.07.24	Hamparan Perak	302.57	150,054	163,521	173,281	Hamparan Perak	20	-	20374
12.07.25	Labuhan Deli	123.91	60,190	67,129	71,938	Helvetia	5	-	20373
12.07.26	Percut Sei Tuan	190.29	384,672	402,468	437,274	Tembung	18	2 ^{(b)}	20371
12.07.03	Sibolangit	159.89	19,654	19,980	21,073	Bandar Baru	30	-	20357
12.07.04	Kutalimbaru	182.21	35,870	36,238	38,429	Kutalimbaru	14	-	20354
12.07.05	Pancur Batu	121.52	84,919	93,470	99,529	Pancur Batu	25	-	20353
12.07.06	Namo Rambe	64.13	36,651	39,697	41,942	Namo Rambe	36	-	20356
12.07.07	Biru-Biru (or Sibiru-Biru)	106.75	34,020	39,083	42,066	Biru-Biru	17	-	20358
	Total Western half	1,383.04	1,199,802	1,260,231	1,352,185		193	5	
12.07.01	Gunung Meriah	95.24	2,472	3,193	3,498	Gunung Meriah	12	-	20583
12.07.20	Sinembah Tanjung; Muda Hulu	225.70	12,333	13,554	14,422	Tiga Juhar	20	-	20582
12.07.08	Sinembah Tanjung; Muda Hilir	209.76	30,563	33,159	35,063	Talun Kenas	15	-	20363
12.07.09	Bangun Purba	120.61	21,550	24,375	26,300	Bangun Purba	24	-	20581
12.07.19	Galang	129.09	61,508	70,136	75,970	Galang	28	1 ^{(c)}	20585
12.07.02	Tanjung Morawa	132.52	192,759	223,450	243,975	Tanjung Morawa	25	1 ^{(d)}	20362
12.07.27	Batang Kuis	44.64	56,270	65,075	70,971	Batang Kuis	11	-	20372
12.07.32	Pantai Labu	85.83	43,135	49,167	53,247	Pantai Labu	19	-	20553
12.07.33	Beringin	56.94	52,415	60,711	66,262	Beringin	11	-	20552
12.07.28	Lubuk Pakam	33.33	80,847	88,576	94,107	Lubuk Pakam	6	7 ^{(e)}	20511 -20518
12.07.31	Pagar Merbau	63.28	36,777	39,814	42,056	Pagar Merbau	16	-	20551
	Total Eastern half	1,196.94	590,629	671,210	725,861		187	9	

Notes: (a) Deli Tua, Deli Tua Barat and Deli Tua Timur. (b) Kenangan and Kenangan Baru. (c) Galang Kota. (d) Pekan Tanjung Morawa.
(e) Cemara, Lubuk Pakam I-II, Lubuk Pakam Pekan, Lubuk Pakam III, Paluh Kemiri, Petapahan and Syahmad.

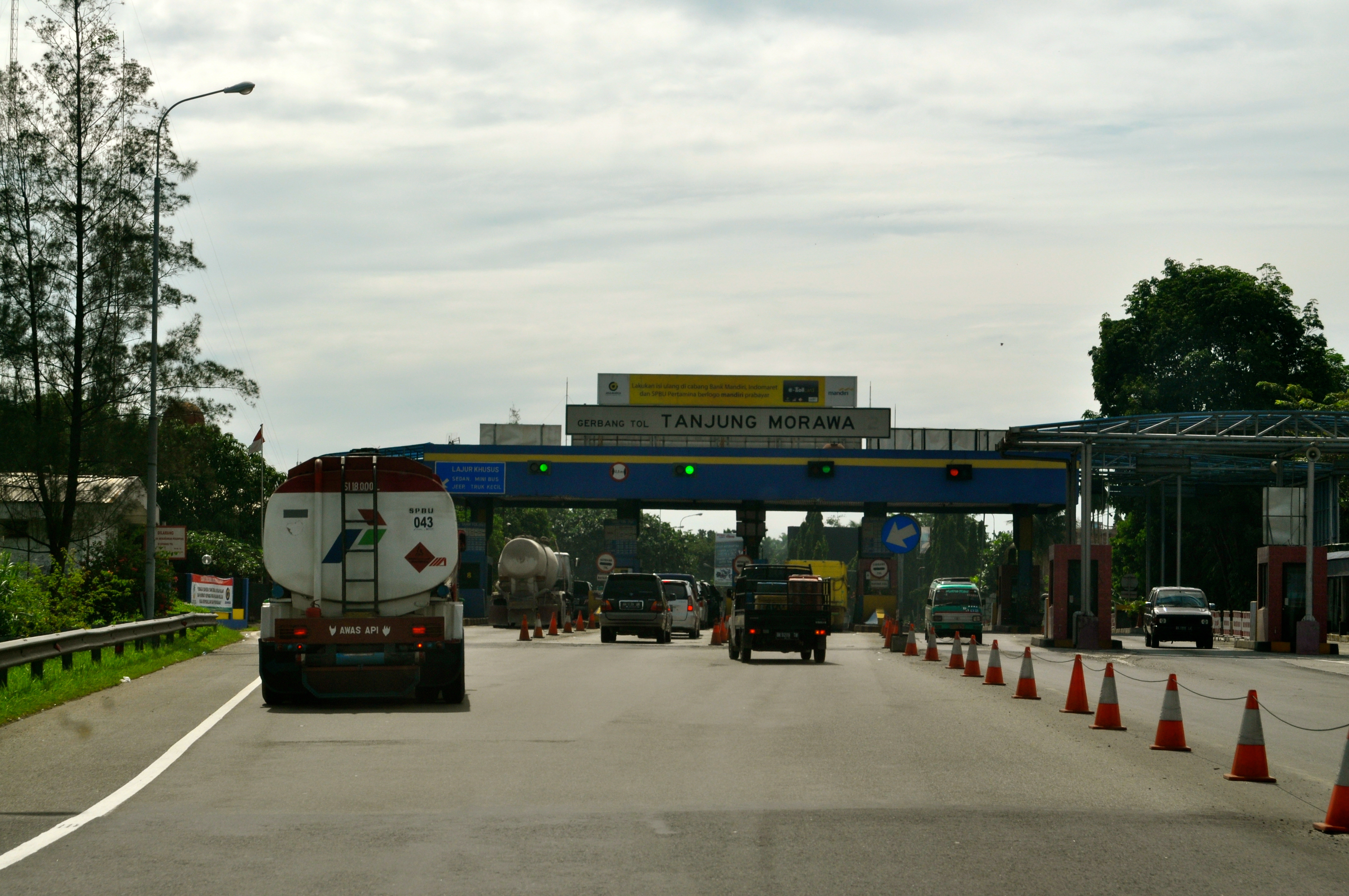
Tanjung Morawa toll gate, Deli Serdang Regency

=== Plantations ===
Plantation commodities in Deli Serdang in 2024 demonstrated diverse yields, with oil palm being the leading crop. Oil palm plantations were spread across all sub-districts, covering an area of 18,162.23 hectares, and production reached 51,666.29 tons. The districts of Sinembah Tanjung Muda Hilir, Sinembah Tanjung Muda Hulu, and Hamparan Perak (all in Deli Serdang) were the main palm oil producing areas, with planted areas of 3,736.11 hectares, 1,984.00 hectares, and 2,114.96 hectares, respectively. Rubber contributed 4,564 tons of production from a planted area of 5,164 hectares. Coconut is another important commodity with 3,247 tons of yield from a planted area of 3,841 hectares, dominated by the Districts of Hamparan Perak and Percut Sei Tuan. Cocoa plants recorded a production of 2,072.43 tons with an area of 2,666.33 hectares, mostly produced from Kutalimbaru and Sinembah Tanjung Muda Hilir.

== Television ==
Channel	Signal	Frequency	Name	Network	Company name	Owner	Status
23	487.250-MHz	UHF	Indosiar		PT Indosiar Visual Mandiri	Elang Mahkota Teknologi	Nasional
25	503.250-MHz	UHF	MNCTV		PT Cipta Televisi Pendidikan Indonesia	Media Nusantara Citra	Nasional
27	519.250-MHz	UHF	Trans TV		PT Televisi Transformasi Indonesia	Trans Media	Nasional
29	535.250-MHz	UHF	ANTV		PT Cakrawala Andalas Televisi	Visi Media Asia	Nasional
31	551.250-MHz	UHF	GTV		PT Global Informasi Bermutu	Media Nusantara Citra	Nasional
33	567.250-MHz	UHF	RCTI		PT Rajawali Citra Televisi Indonesia	Media Nusantara Citra	Nasional
35	583.250-MHz	UHF	SCTV		PT Surya Citra Televisi	Elang Mahkota Teknologi	Nasional
37	599.250-MHz	UHF	tvOne		PT Lativi Media Karya	Visi Media Asia	Nasional
39	615.250-MHz	UHF	Metro TV		PT Media Televisi Indonesia	Media Group	Nasional
41	631.250-MHz	UHF	Trans7		PT Duta Visual Nusantara Tivi Tujuh	Trans Media	Nasional
43	647.250-MHz	UHF	NET.		PT Net Mediatama Indonesia	Indika Group	Nasional
45	663.250-MHz	UHF	iNews		PT Deli Media Televisi	Media Nusantara Citra	Nasional
47	679.250-MHz	UHF	TVRI Nasional	TVRI	Lembaga Penyiaran Publik TVRI	Pemerintah Indonesia	Nasional
47	679.250-MHz	UHF	TVRI Sumatra Utara	TVRI	Lembaga Penyiaran Publik TVRI	Pemeritah Sumatra Utara	Lokal
49	695.250-MHz	UHF	DAAI TV		PT Daya Angkasa Andalas Indah Televisi	Tau Chi Media	Berjaringan
51	751.250-MHz	UHF	BeritaSatu		PT First Media News	Media Holdings Group	
50	703.250-MHz	UHF	TVRI Nasional	TVRI	Lembaga Penyiaran Publik TVRI	Pemerintah Indonesia	Nasional
53	727.250-MHz	UHF	RTV		PT Cahaya Nusantara Perkasa Televisi	Rajawali Corpora	Nasional
54	735.250-MHz	UHF	Efarina TV		PT Efarina Televisi	Efarina Etham	Nasional
55	737.250-MHz	UHF	MYTV		PT Banten Media Global Televisi	Netwave Group dan Mayapada Group	Nasional
57	739.250-MHz	UHF	Info TV		PT Info Mayapada	Mayapada Group	Nasional
59	775.250-MHz	UHF	Kompas TV		PT Gramedia Media Nusantara	Kompas Gramedia	Nasional

== See also ==
- Sultanate of Deli
- Sultanate of Serdang
