= 2022 Liga 3 West Nusa Tenggara =

Bank NTB Syariah Liga 3

Tournament details
- Country: Indonesia
- Dates: 6 August 2022
- Teams: 26
- Qualified for: 2022 Liga 3 National Round

Tournament statistics
- Matches played: 76
- Goals scored: 202 (2.66 per match)

The 2022 Liga 3 West Nusa Tenggara or 2022 Bank NTB Syariah Liga 3 for sponsor reasons, is the fifth season of Liga 3 West Nusa Tenggara organized by Asprov PSSI NTB.

Followed by 26 clubs. The winner of this competition will advance to the national round without the regional round Lesser Sunda Islands representing West Nusa Tenggara Province for promotion to Liga 2.

Perslobar West Lombok is the defending champion after winning it in the 2021 season.

== Teams ==
2022 Liga 3 West Nusa Tenggara was attended by 26 teams from regencies and cities in West Nusa Tenggara who registered with the Asprov PSSI NTB.

No	Team	Location
01	PS Mataram	Mataram City
02	PS Fatahillah 354	Mataram City
03	PS Selaparang Raya	Mataram City
04	PS Bima Sakti	Mataram City
05	Infa	Mataram City
06	Bintang Ampenan	Mataram City
07	PSKT West Sumbawa	West Sumbawa Regency
08	PS Cordova University	West Sumbawa Regency
09	Panser	West Sumbawa Regency
10	Bomber	West Sumbawa Regency
11	Persebi Bima	Bima Regency
12	Persidom Dompu	Dompu Regency
13	PS Daygun	North Lombok Regency
14	Perslobar West Lombok	West Lombok Regency
15	Lombok	West Lombok Regency
16	Garuda Muda	West Lombok Regency
17	Perslotim East Lombok	East Lombok Regency
18	PS Hamzanwadi	East Lombok Regency
19	PS Bintang Kejora	East Lombok Regency
20	Persisum Sumbawa	Sumbawa Regency
21	Lebah	Sumbawa Regency
22	PS Sumbawa	Sumbawa Regency
23	PSLT Central Lombok	Central Lombok Regency
24	Mandalika	Central Lombok Regency
25	Persekobi Bima	Bima City
26	Galaxy	Bima City

=== Team name changes ===
- PS West Sumbawa renamed PS Cordova University.

== Venues ==
1. GOR 17 Desember Stadium, Mataram City
2. Pragas Stadium, Sumbawa Regency
3. Gelora Bou Lanta Stadium, Bima Regency

== First round ==
=== Group A ===
Pos	Team	Pld	W	D	L	GF	GA	GD	Pts	Qualification	LOM	MAT	PBR	IFC	BIN	PCL	PSF	PSH
1	Lombok	7	6	1	0	13	3	+10	19	Advance to Second round	—			2–1	5–1	2–0	1–0	
2	PS Mataram	7	5	2	0	20	2	+18	17	Advance to Second round	0–0	—		5–0	4–0	2–1	5–0	4–1
3	Perslobar (H)	7	5	1	1	15	2	+13	16		0–1	0–0	—	4–0	3–1	2–0	4–0	2–0
4	Infa	7	2	2	3	5	13	−8	8					—	2–1			
5	Bintang Ampenan	7	2	0	5	8	18	−10	6						—			
6	PSLT	7	1	2	4	8	11	−3	5					0–0	1–3	—	4–0	2–2
7	PS Fatahillah 354	7	1	1	5	3	18	−15	4					1–1	0–2		—	2–1
8	PS Hamzanwadi	7	1	1	5	8	13	−5	4					0–1	3–0			—

Source: Liga 3 2022 West Nusa Tenggara
Legend: Blue = home team win; Yellow = draw; Red = away team win.
(H) Hosts

=== Group B ===
Pos	Team	Pld	W	D	L	GF	GA	GD	Pts	Qualification	PTM	PBS	PSD	GMU	PBK	PSR	MAN
1	Perslotim	6	5	1	0	14	0	+14	16	Advance to Second round	—		1–0	1–0		9–0	0–0
2	PS Bima Sakti (H)	6	3	2	1	7	4	+3	11	Advance to Second round	0–1	—	3–2	0–0	1–1	2–0	1–0
3	PS Daygun	6	3	1	2	7	6	+1	10				—	0–0			1–0
4	Garuda Muda	6	2	3	1	4	3	+1	9					—			
5	PS Bintang Kejora	6	2	2	2	9	7	+2	8		0–2		1–2	0–0	—	4–1	3–1
6	PS Seleparang Raya	6	1	0	5	5	19	−14	3				1–2	1–2		—	2–0
7	Mandalika	6	0	1	5	2	9	−7	1					1–2			—

Source: Liga 3 2022 West Nusa Tenggara
Legend: Blue = home team win; Yellow = draw; Red = away team win.
(H) Hosts

=== Group C ===
Pos	Team	Pld	W	D	L	GF	GA	GD	Pts	Qualification	LBH	PNR	BBR	PBI	PCU	PSU
1	Lebah (H)	5	4	1	0	9	1	+8	13	Advance to Second round	—	2–0	1–0	0–0	2–1	4–0
2	Panser	5	2	2	1	6	2	+4	8	Advance to Second round		—				
3	Bomber	5	2	2	1	5	3	+2	8			0–0	—			1–0
4	Persekobi	5	1	3	1	3	7	−4	6			0–5	1–1	—	0–0	2–1
5	PS Cordova University	5	0	3	2	3	6	−3	3			0–0	1–3		—	1–1
6	Persisum	5	0	1	4	2	9	−7	1			0–1				—

Source: Liga 3 2022 West Nusa Tenggara
Legend: Blue = home team win; Yellow = draw; Red = away team win.
(H) Hosts

=== Group D ===
Pos	Team	Pld	W	D	L	GF	GA	GD	Pts	Qualification	BIM	PDM	PSS	PWS	GXY
1	Persebi (H)	4	4	0	0	12	8	+4	12	Advance to Second round	—	1–0	4–3	4–3	3–2
2	Persidom	4	2	1	1	7	4	+3	7	Advance to Second round		—	1–1	3–2	3–0
3	PS Sumbawa	4	1	2	1	7	7	0	5				—		
4	PSKT	4	1	0	3	9	10	−1	3				0–1	—	
5	Galaxy	4	0	1	3	6	12	−6	1				2–2	2–4	—

Source: Liga 3 2022 West Nusa Tenggara
Legend: Blue = home team win; Yellow = draw; Red = away team win.
(H) Hosts

== Second round ==
=== Group E ===
Pos	Team	Pld	W	D	L	GF	GA	GD	Pts	Qualification	LOM	PTM	PNR	PDM
1	Lombok	0	0	0	0	0	0	0	0	Advance to Knockout stage	—			
2	Perslotim	0	0	0	0	0	0	0	0	Advance to Knockout stage		—		
3	Panser	0	0	0	0	0	0	0	0				—	
4	Persidom	0	0	0	0	0	0	0	0					—

Updated to match(es) played on unknown. Source: Liga 3 2022 West Nusa Tenggara
Legend: Blue = home team win; Yellow = draw; Red = away team win.

=== Group F ===
Pos	Team	Pld	W	D	L	GF	GA	GD	Pts	Qualification	MAT	PBS	LBH	BIM
1	PS Mataram	1	1	0	0	3	1	+2	3	Advance to Knockout stage	—			
2	PS Bima Sakti	1	0	1	0	0	0	0	1	Advance to Knockout stage		—		
3	Lebah	1	0	1	0	0	0	0	1			0–0	—	
4	Persebi	1	0	0	1	1	3	−2	0		1–3			—

Updated to match(es) played on unknown. Source: Liga 3 2022 West Nusa Tenggara
Legend: Blue = home team win; Yellow = draw; Red = away team win.

== Knockout stage ==
Semi-finals

Final
Third place
