= 2025–26 Liga 4 West Nusa Tenggara =

Liga 4 West Nusa Tenggara
- Season: 2025–26
- Dates: 10 January – 12 February 2026
- Champions: PS Daygun (1st title)
- National phase: PS Daygun; Persebi; Perslotim

The 2025–26 Liga 4 West Nusa Tenggara is the second season of Liga 4 West Nusa Tenggara after the change in the structure of Indonesian football competition and serves as a qualifying round for the national phase of the 2025–26 Liga 4.

The competition is organised by the West Nusa Tenggara Provincial PSSI Association.

== Teams ==
A total of 27 teams are competing in this season.

No	Team	Location
Lombok Island zone
1	Garuda Muda	West Lombok Regency
2	Perslobar	West Lombok Regency
3	Bintang Ampenan	Mataram City
4	INFA	Mataram City
5	PS Bima Sakti	Mataram City
6	PS Fatahillah 354	Mataram City
7	PS Mataram	Mataram City
8	PS Selaparang Raya	Mataram City
9	Redwood	Mataram City
10	PS Daygun	North Lombok Regency
11	Mandalika	Central Lombok Regency
12	PSLT	Central Lombok Regency
13	Anzala	East Lombok Regency
14	Perslotim	East Lombok Regency
15	PS Hamzanwadi	East Lombok Regency
16	PS Bintang Kejora	East Lombok Regency

No	Team	Location
Sumbawa Island zone
1	Bomber	West Sumbawa Regency
2	Cordova University	West Sumbawa Regency
3	PSKT	West Sumbawa Regency
4	Panser	West Sumbawa Regency
5	PS Sumbawa	Sumbawa Regency
6	Persisum	Sumbawa Regency
7	Persidom	Dompu Regency
8	Persebi Bima	Bima Regency
9	Bima United	Bima City
10	Galaxy	Bima City
11	Persekobi	Bima City

== Lombok Island zone ==
=== First round ===
A total of 16 teams will be drawn into 4 groups based on the geographical location of their home bases. The first round will be played in a home tournament format of single round-robin matches. The top two teams of each group will qualify for the second round.

==== Group A ====
All matches will be held at Gelora 17 December Stadium, Mataram.

Pos	Team	Pld	W	D	L	GF	GA	GD	Pts	Qualification
1	PS Mataram	3	3	0	0	8	1	+7	9	Qualification to the second round
2	PS Daygun	3	2	0	1	3	2	+1	6	Qualification to the second round
3	Perslobar	3	1	0	2	5	5	0	3	
4	Garuda Muda	3	0	0	3	1	9	−8	0	

Source: 2025–26 Liga 4 West Nusa Tenggara
Rules for classification: 1) Points; 2) Head-to-head points; 3) Head-to-head goal difference; 4) Head-to-head goals scored; 5) Goal difference; 6) Goals scored; 7) Fair-play points; 8) Draw.

==== Group B ====
All matches will be held at Gelora 17 December Stadium, Mataram.

Pos	Team	Pld	W	D	L	GF	GA	GD	Pts	Qualification
1	PS Bintang Kejora	3	3	0	0	9	2	+7	9	Qualification to the second round
2	PS Bima Sakti	3	2	0	1	5	4	+1	6	Qualification to the second round
3	Redwood	3	0	1	2	1	3	−2	1	
4	PS Selaparang Raya	3	0	1	2	1	7	−6	1	

Source: 2025–26 Liga 4 West Nusa Tenggara
Rules for classification: 1) Points; 2) Head-to-head points; 3) Head-to-head goal difference; 4) Head-to-head goals scored; 5) Goal difference; 6) Goals scored; 7) Fair-play points; 8) Draw.

==== Group C ====
All matches will be held at Gelora 17 December Stadium, Mataram.

Pos	Team	Pld	W	D	L	GF	GA	GD	Pts	Qualification
1	PSLT	3	2	1	0	9	2	+7	7	Qualification to the second round
2	Bintang Ampenan	3	1	2	0	7	4	+3	5	Qualification to the second round
3	Mandalika	3	1	0	2	8	8	0	3	
4	PS Hamzanwadi	3	0	1	2	4	14	−10	1	

Source: 2025–26 Liga 4 West Nusa Tenggara
Rules for classification: 1) Points; 2) Head-to-head points; 3) Head-to-head goal difference; 4) Head-to-head goals scored; 5) Goal difference; 6) Goals scored; 7) Fair-play points; 8) Draw.

==== Group D ====
All matches will be held at Gelora 17 December Stadium, Mataram.

Pos	Team	Pld	W	D	L	GF	GA	GD	Pts	Qualification
1	Perslotim	3	3	0	0	16	1	+15	9	Qualification to the second round
2	Anzala	3	1	1	1	4	6	−2	4	Qualification to the second round
3	INFA	3	1	0	2	5	10	−5	3	
4	PS Fatahillah 354	3	0	1	2	2	2	0	1	

Source: 2025–26 Liga 4 West Nusa Tenggara
Rules for classification: 1) Points; 2) Head-to-head points; 3) Head-to-head goal difference; 4) Head-to-head goals scored; 5) Goal difference; 6) Goals scored; 7) Fair-play points; 8) Draw.

=== Second round ===
A total of 8 teams will be drawn into 2 groups. The second round will be played in a home tournament format of single round-robin matches. The top two teams of each group will qualify for the knockout round.

==== Group H ====
All matches will be held at Gelora 17 December Stadium, Mataram.

Pos	Team	Pld	W	D	L	GF	GA	GD	Pts	Qualification
1	PSLT	3	2	1	0	12	4	+8	7	Qualification to the knockout round
2	PS Mataram	3	2	0	1	7	5	+2	6	Qualification to the knockout round
3	PS Bima Sakti	3	1	1	1	5	6	−1	4	
4	Anzala	2	0	0	2	3	12	−9	0	

Source: 2025–26 Liga 4 West Nusa Tenggara
Rules for classification: 1) Points; 2) Head-to-head points; 3) Head-to-head goal difference; 4) Head-to-head goals scored; 5) Goal difference; 6) Goals scored; 7) Fair-play points; 8) Draw.

==== Group I ====
All matches will be held at Gelora 17 December Stadium, Mataram.

Pos	Team	Pld	W	D	L	GF	GA	GD	Pts	Qualification
1	PS Daygun	3	2	1	0	5	2	+3	7	Qualification to the knockout round
2	Perslotim	3	1	2	0	6	0	+6	5	Qualification to the knockout round
3	PS Bintang Kejora	3	1	1	1	3	3	0	4	
4	Bintang Ampenan	3	0	0	3	2	11	−9	0	

Updated to match(es) played on 29 January 2026. Source: 2025–26 Liga 4 West Nusa Tenggara
Rules for classification: 1) Points; 2) Head-to-head points; 3) Head-to-head goal difference; 4) Head-to-head goals scored; 5) Goal difference; 6) Goals scored; 7) Fair-play points; 8) Draw.

=== Knockout round ===
The knockout round will be played as a single match. If tied after regulation time, extra time and, if necessary, a penalty shoot-out will be used to decide the winning team.

=== Bracket ===
Semi-finals
31 January
PS Daygun	2
PS Mataram	1
31 January
PSLT	0
Perslotim	2

Final
2026
PS Daygun
Perslotim

== Sumbawa Island zone ==
=== First round ===
A total of 11 teams will be drawn into 3 groups based on the geographical location of their home bases. The first round will be played in a home tournament format of single round-robin matches. The top two teams of each group will qualify for the second round.

==== Group E ====
All matches will be held at GOR Lalu Magaparang Stadium, West Sumbawa.

Pos	Team	Pld	W	D	L	GF	GA	GD	Pts	Qualification
1	Bima United	2	1	1	0	10	5	+5	4	Qualification to the second round
2	Galaxy	2	1	0	1	4	8	−4	3	Qualification to the second round
3	PSKT	2	0	1	1	4	5	−1	1	

Source: 2025–26 Liga 4 West Nusa Tenggara
Rules for classification: 1) Points; 2) Head-to-head points; 3) Head-to-head goal difference; 4) Head-to-head goals scored; 5) Goal difference; 6) Goals scored; 7) Fair-play points; 8) Draw.

==== Group F ====
All matches will be held at GOR Lalu Magaparang Stadium, West Sumbawa.

Pos	Team	Pld	W	D	L	GF	GA	GD	Pts	Qualification
1	Persebi Bima	3	3	0	0	9	0	+9	9	Qualification to the second round
2	Bomber	3	1	0	2	6	3	+3	3	Qualification to the second round
3	Persisum	3	1	0	2	2	5	−3	3	
4	Cordova University	3	1	0	2	1	10	−9	3	

Source: 2025–26 Liga 4 West Nusa Tenggara
Rules for classification: 1) Points; 2) Head-to-head points; 3) Head-to-head goal difference; 4) Head-to-head goals scored; 5) Goal difference; 6) Goals scored; 7) Fair-play points; 8) Draw.

==== Group G ====
All matches will be held at GOR Lalu Magaparang Stadium, West Sumbawa.

Pos	Team	Pld	W	D	L	GF	GA	GD	Pts	Qualification
1	Persidom	3	2	0	1	6	1	+5	6	Qualification to the second round
2	PS Sumbawa	3	2	0	1	10	4	+6	6	Qualification to the second round
3	Persekobi	3	2	0	1	10	7	+3	6	
4	Panser	3	0	0	3	3	17	−14	0	

Source: 2025–26 Liga 4 West Nusa Tenggara
Rules for classification: 1) Points; 2) Head-to-head points; 3) Head-to-head goal difference; 4) Head-to-head goals scored; 5) Goal difference; 6) Goals scored; 7) Fair-play points; 8) Draw.

=== Second round ===
A total of 6 teams will be drawn into 2 groups. The second round will be played in a home tournament format of single round-robin matches. The top two teams of each group will qualify for the knockout round.

==== Group J ====
All matches will be held at GOR Lalu Magaparang Stadium, West Sumbawa.

Pos	Team	Pld	W	D	L	GF	GA	GD	Pts	Qualification
1	Bomber	2	1	1	0	1	0	+1	4	Qualification to the knockout round
2	Bima United	2	1	0	1	2	1	+1	3	Qualification to the knockout round
3	PS Sumbawa	2	0	1	1	0	2	−2	1	

Updated to match(es) played on unknown. Source: 2025–26 Liga 4 West Nusa Tenggara
Rules for classification: 1) Points; 2) Head-to-head points; 3) Head-to-head goal difference; 4) Head-to-head goals scored; 5) Goal difference; 6) Goals scored; 7) Fair-play points; 8) Draw.

==== Group K ====
All matches will be held at GOR Lalu Magaparang Stadium, West Sumbawa.

Pos	Team	Pld	W	D	L	GF	GA	GD	Pts	Qualification
1	Persebi Bima	2	1	1	0	5	1	+4	4	Qualification to the knockout round
2	Persidom	2	1	1	0	3	2	+1	4	Qualification to the knockout round
3	Galaxy	2	0	0	2	3	8	−5	0	

Updated to match(es) played on 27 January 2026. Source: 2025–26 Liga 4 West Nusa Tenggara
Rules for classification: 1) Points; 2) Head-to-head points; 3) Head-to-head goal difference; 4) Head-to-head goals scored; 5) Goal difference; 6) Goals scored; 7) Fair-play points; 8) Draw.

=== Knockout round ===
The knockout round will be played as a single match. If tied after regulation time, extra time and, if necessary, a penalty shoot-out will be used to decide the winning team.

=== Bracket ===
Semi-finals
29 January
Persebi Bima	2 (7)
Bima United	2 (6)
29 January
Bomber	0
Persidom Dompu	1

Final
2026
Persebi Bima
Persidom Dompu

== Final round ==
The top 2 teams from the Lombok Island zone and the top 2 teams from the Sumbawa Island zone will compete in a single group. The tournament will be played in a home tournament format with a single round-robin system. The team that finishes in first place will be crowned the champion.

Pos	Team	Pld	W	D	L	GF	GA	GD	Pts	Qualification
1	PS Daygun	3	2	1	0	4	1	+3	7	Qualification to the National phase
2	Persebi Bima	3	2	0	1	5	3	+2	6	
3	Perslotim	3	1	0	2	2	3	−1	3	
4	Persidom	3	0	1	2	1	5	−4	1	

Rules for classification: 1) Points; 2) Head-to-head points; 3) Head-to-head goal difference; 4) Head-to-head goals scored; 5) Goal difference; 6) Goals scored; 7) Fair-play points; 8) Draw.

== See also ==
- 2025–26 Liga 4
