= 2017 Liga 3 West Nusa Tenggara =

Liga 3 West Nusa Tenggara
- Season: 2017
- Champions: PSKT West Sumbawa (2nd titles)

The 2017 Liga 3 West Nusa Tenggara is the third edition of Liga 3 West Nusa Tenggara as a qualifying round for the 2017 Liga 3.

The competition scheduled starts on 31 July 2017.

== Teams ==
There are 12 clubs which will participate the league in this season. 5 clubs are from Sumbawa Zone and 7 clubs are from Lombok Zone.

Lombok Zone
PSLT Central Lombok
PS Daygun
PS Mataram
PS Selaparang Raya
Perslobar West Lombok
PS Fatahilah 354
Perslotim East Lombok

Sumbawa Zone
PSKT West Sumbawa
Persisum Sumbawa
Persidom Dompu
Persekobi Bima
Persebi Bima

== Group stage ==
This stage scheduled starts on 31 July 2017.

=== Sumbawa Zone ===
| Pos | Team | Pld | W | D | L | GF | GA | GD | Pts | Qualification |
|---|---|---|---|---|---|---|---|---|---|---|
| 1 | PSKT (A) | 4 | 3 | 1 | 0 | 9 | 1 | +8 | 10 | Advance to knockout stage |
| 2 | Persisum (A) | 4 | 2 | 1 | 1 | 6 | 5 | +1 | 7 | Advance to knockout stage |
| 3 | Persekobi | 4 | 1 | 1 | 2 | 4 | 6 | −2 | 4 | |
| 4 | Persebi | 4 | 1 | 1 | 2 | 3 | 5 | −2 | 4 | |
| 5 | Persidom | 4 | 1 | 0 | 3 | 5 | 10 | −5 | 3 | |

Updated to match(es) played on 5 August 2017. Source:
(A) Advance to a further round
1 August 2017
14:00 WITA

| PSKT | 3–0 | Persidom |

GOR Lalu Magaparang, Taliwang
1 August 2017
16:00 WITA

| Persebi | 1–0 | Persekobi |
|---|---|---|
| Salahudin 57' | Report |

GOR Lalu Magaparang, Taliwang
2 August 2017
14:00 WITA

| Persekobi | 0–0 | Persisum |

GOR Lalu Magaparang, Taliwang
2 August 2017
16:00 WITA

| Persidom | 1–0 | Persebi |

GOR Lalu Magaparang, Taliwang
3 August 2017
14:00 WITA

| Persidom | 2–4 | Persekobi |

GOR Lalu Magaparang, Taliwang
3 August 2017
16:00 WITA

| PSKT | 2–0 | Persisum |

GOR Lalu Magaparang, Taliwang
5 August 2017
14:00 WITA

| PSKT | 1–1 | Persebi |

GOR Lalu Magaparang, Taliwang
5 August 2017
16:00 WITA

| Persidom | 2–3 | Persisum |

GOR Lalu Magaparang, Taliwang
6 August 2017
14:00 WITA

| Persebi | 1–3 | Persisum |

GOR Lalu Magaparang, Taliwang
6 August 2017
16:00 WITA

| Persekobi | 0–3 | PSKT |

GOR Lalu Magaparang, Taliwang

=== Lombok Zone ===
Lombok Zone divided into two groups.

==== Group A (Lombok) ====
| Pos | Team | Pld | W | D | L | GF | GA | GD | Pts | Qualification |
|---|---|---|---|---|---|---|---|---|---|---|
| 1 | PS Mataram | 2 | 2 | 0 | 0 | 4 | 0 | +4 | 6 | Advance to regional semifinals |
| 2 | PS Daygun | 2 | 1 | 0 | 1 | 2 | 2 | 0 | 3 | Advance to regional semifinals |
| 3 | PSLT | 2 | 0 | 0 | 2 | 1 | 5 | −4 | 0 | |

Updated to match(es) played on 3 August 2017. Source:
31 July 2017
15:30 WITA

| PSLT | 1–2 | PS Daygun |
|---|---|---|
| Rio | Report | Rumisah 71'; Agus Luat 90+' |

Bundar Field, Praya
2 August 2017
14:00 WITA

| PS Daygun | 0–1 | PS Mataram |

Bundar Field, Praya
3 August 2017
16:00 WITA

| PS Mataram | 3–0 | PSLT |

Lapangan Bundar, Praya

==== Group B (Lombok) ====
Each club plays against two clubs instead of all three clubs.

| Pos | Team | Pld | W | D | L | GF | GA | GD | Pts | Qualification |
|---|---|---|---|---|---|---|---|---|---|---|
| 1 | Perslotim | 2 | 1 | 1 | 0 | 7 | 1 | +6 | 4 | Advance to regional semifinals |
| 2 | PS Fatahilah 354 | 2 | 1 | 1 | 0 | 2 | 1 | +1 | 4 | Advance to regional semifinals |
| 3 | PS Selaparang Raya | 2 | 0 | 2 | 0 | 1 | 1 | 0 | 2 | |
| 4 | Perslobar | 2 | 0 | 0 | 2 | 1 | 8 | −7 | 0 | |

Updated to match(es) played on 2 August 2017. Source:
1 August 2017
14:00 WITA

| Perslotim | 0–0 | PS Selaparang Raya |
|---|---|---|
| | Report |

Bundar Field, Praya
1 August 2017
16:00 WITA

| PS Fatahilah 354 | 1–0 | Perslobar |
|---|---|---|
| | Report |

Bundar Field, Praya
2 August 2017
16:00 WITA

| PS Selaparang Raya | 1–1 | PS Fatahilah 354 |

Bundar Field, Praya
3 August 2017
14:00 WITA

| Perslobar | 1–7 | Perslotim |

Bundar Field, Praya

==== Semi-finals (Lombok) ====
Semifinals
5 August – Praya
PS Mataram | 2
PS Fatahillah 354 | 0
5 August – Praya
Perslotim | 4
PS Daygun | 1

Final
6 August – Praya
PS Mataram | 0 (4)
Perslotim | 0 (3)

== Knockout stage ==
Semifinals
23 August – Mataram
PS Mataram | 0 (5)
Persisum | 0 (4)
23 August – Mataram
PSKT | 2
Perslotim | 0

Final
25 August – Mataram
PS Mataram | 0
PSKT | 2
