= 2023 Liga 3 West Nusa Tenggara =

Bank NTB Syariah Liga 3

Tournament details
- Country: Indonesia
- Dates: 30 September – 15 November 2023
- Teams: 25

Final positions
- Champions: PS Mataram (1st title)
- Runners-up: Lebah
- Third place: Persebi
- Fourth place: PS Hamzanwadi
- Qualified for: 2023–24 Liga 3 National Phase

2023 Liga 3 West Nusa Tenggara (referred to as 2023 Bank NTB Syariah Liga 3 for sponsor reasons) was the sixth season of Liga 3 West Nusa Tenggara organized by Asprov PSSI West Nusa Tenggara.

Followed by 25 clubs. The winner of this competition will advance to the national round without the regional round Lesser Sunda Islands representing West Nusa Tenggara for promotion to Liga 2.

== Teams ==
No	Team	Location
Lombok Region
1	PS Mataram	Mataram City
2	PS Selaparang Raya	Mataram City
3	PS Bima Sakti	Mataram City
4	INFA	Mataram City
5	Bintang Ampenan	Mataram City
6	PS Daygun	North Lombok Regency
7	Perslobar West Lombok	West Lombok Regency
8	Garuda Muda	West Lombok Regency
9	Perslotim East Lombok	East Lombok Regency
10	PS Hamzanwadi	East Lombok Regency
11	PS Bintang Kejora	East Lombok Regency
12	PSLT Central Lombok	Central Lombok Regency
13	Mandalika	Central Lombok Regency
Greater Sumbawa Region
1	PSKT West Sumbawa	West Sumbawa Regency
2	PS Cordova University	West Sumbawa Regency
3	Panser	West Sumbawa Regency
4	Bomber	West Sumbawa Regency
5	Persisum Sumbawa	Sumbawa Regency
6	Lebah	Sumbawa Regency
7	PS Sumbawa	Sumbawa Regency
Bima and Dompu Region
1	Persebi Bima	Bima Regency
2	Persidom Dompu	Dompu Regency
3	Persekobi Bima	Bima City
4	Galaxy	Bima City
5	Bima United	Bima City

== Venues ==
- Gelora 17 Desember Stadium, Mataram City
- Gibraltar Taliwang Stadium, West Sumbawa Regency
- Gelora Bou Lanta Lambu Stadium, Bima Regency

== First round ==
A total of 25 teams will be drawn into 4 groups based on their geographical location. The 4 groups are as follows:

- Group A & B : Lombok zone
- Group C : Sumbawa & West Sumbawa zones
- Group D : Bima & Dompu zones

=== Group A ===
Pos	Team	Pld	W	D	L	GF	GA	GD	Pts	Qualification	PSH	MAT	BIN	PBS	PSD	IFC	PSR
1	PS Hamzanwadi	6	6	0	0	16	5	+11	18	Advance to Second round	—	1–0			3–1	6–2	2–0
2	PS Mataram	6	5	0	1	20	2	+18	15	Advance to Second round		—	4–0			5–0	5–0
3	Bintang Ampenan	6	3	0	3	13	10	+3	9		1–2		—	1–0	1–3		
4	PS Bima Sakti	6	2	0	4	6	9	−3	6		1–2	0–3		—	2–0		
5	PS Daygun	6	2	0	4	10	14	−4	6			1–3			—	3–2	2–3
6	INFA	6	2	0	4	10	20	−10	6				0–5	3–1		—	
7	PS Seleparang Raya	6	1	0	5	4	19	−15	3				1–5	0–2		0–3	—

Source: Liga 3 2023 West Nusa Tenggara

=== Group B ===
Pos	Team	Pld	W	D	L	GF	GA	GD	Pts	Qualification	GMU	PBR	MAN	PTM	PBK	PCL
1	Garuda Muda	5	3	2	0	10	0	+10	11	Advance to Second round	—	0–0	0–0			
2	Perslobar	5	3	2	0	8	1	+7	11	Advance to Second round		—	1–0		0–0	
3	Mandalika	5	3	1	1	6	4	+2	10				—	1–0	4–3	1–0
4	Perslotim	5	1	1	3	1	4	−3	4		0–2	0–1		—		1–0
5	PS Bintang Kejora	5	0	3	2	4	10	−6	3		0–5			0–0	—	1–1
6	PSLT	5	0	1	4	2	12	−10	1		0–3	1–6				—

Source: Liga 3 2023 West Nusa Tenggara

=== Group C ===
Pos	Team	Pld	W	D	L	GF	GA	GD	Pts	Qualification	LBH	BBR	PSU	PWS	PCU	PSS	PNR
1	Lebah	6	5	0	1	16	1	+15	15	Advance to Second round	—		2–0		6–0	2–0	
2	Bomber	6	4	2	0	7	2	+5	14	Advance to Second round	1–0	—		2–1			3–1
3	Persisum	6	2	3	1	3	3	0	9			0–0	—	1–1	1–0		
4	PSKT	6	2	1	3	5	5	0	7		0–1			—			1–0
5	PS Cordova University	6	2	0	4	4	12	−8	6			0–1		1–0	—		1–3
6	PS Sumbawa	6	1	1	4	4	8	−4	4			0–0	0–1	0–2	1–2	—	
7	Panser	6	1	1	4	5	13	−8	4		0–5		0–0			1–3	—

Source: Liga 3 2023 West Nusa Tenggara

=== Group D ===
Pos	Team	Pld	W	D	L	GF	GA	GD	Pts	Qualification	PDM	BIM	PBM	GXY	BMU
1	Persidom	4	3	1	0	9	2	+7	10	Advance to Second round	—				3–0
2	Persebi	4	3	0	1	15	7	+8	9	Advance to Second round	0–1	—			6–1
3	Persekobi	4	2	1	1	10	7	+3	7		2–2	1–3	—		
4	Galaxy	4	1	0	3	7	13	−6	3		0–3	4–6	0–3	—	
5	Bima United	4	0	0	4	4	16	−12	0				2–4	1–3	—

Source: Liga 3 2023 West Nusa Tenggara

== Second round ==
=== Group E ===
Pos	Team	Pld	W	D	L	GF	GA	GD	Pts	Qualification
1	PS Hamzanwadi	3	2	1	0	5	3	+2	7	Advance to Knockout round
2	Persebi	3	2	1	0	4	2	+2	7	Advance to Knockout round
3	Garuda Muda	3	0	1	2	2	4	−2	1	
4	Bomber	3	0	1	2	1	3	−2	1	

Updated to match(es) played on 8 November 2023. Source: Liga 3 2023 West Nusa Tenggara
1 November 2023
14.00 WITA (UTC+8)

PS Hamzanwadi	1–0	Bomber
	Report

Gelora 17 Desember Stadium, Mataram City
1 November 2023
16.00 WITA (UTC+8)

Garuda Muda	0–1	Persebi
	Report

Gelora 17 Desember Stadium, Mataram City

3 November 2023
14.00 WITA (UTC+8)

Persebi	2–2	PS Hamzanwadi
	Report

Gelora 17 Desember Stadium, Mataram City
3 November 2023
16.00 WITA (UTC+8)

Bomber	1–1	Garuda Muda
	Report

Gelora 17 Desember Stadium, Mataram City

8 November 2023
14.00 WITA (UTC+8)

Persebi	1–0	Bomber
	Report

Gelora 17 Desember Stadium, Mataram City
8 November 2023
16.00 WITA (UTC+8)

PS Hamzanwadi	2–1	Garuda Muda
	Report

Gelora 17 Desember Stadium, Mataram City

=== Group F ===
Pos	Team	Pld	W	D	L	GF	GA	GD	Pts	Qualification
1	PS Mataram	3	2	0	1	4	3	+1	6 (Note: Head-to-head result: Lebah 0–1 PS Mataram.)	Advance to Knockout round
2	Lebah	3	2	0	1	7	2	+5	6	Advance to Knockout round
3	Perslobar	3	1	1	1	3	6	−3	4	
4	Persidom	3	0	1	2	3	6	−3	1	

Updated to match(es) played on 10 November 2023. Source: Liga 3 2023 West Nusa Tenggara
Notes:
2 November 2023
14.00 WITA (UTC+8)

Lebah	0–1	PS Mataram
	Report

Gelora 17 Desember Stadium, Mataram City
2 November 2023
16.00 WITA (UTC+8)

Persidom	1–1	Perslobar
	Report

Gelora 17 Desember Stadium, Mataram City

7 November 2023
14.00 WITA (UTC+8)

Perslobar	0–5	Lebah
	Report

Gelora 17 Desember Stadium, Mataram City
7 November 2023
16.00 WITA (UTC+8)

PS Mataram	3–1	Persidom
	Report

Gelora 17 Desember Stadium, Mataram City

10 November 2023
14.00 WITA (UTC+8)

Perslobar	2–0	PS Mataram
	Report

Gelora 17 Desember Stadium, Mataram City
10 November 2023
16.00 WITA (UTC+8)

Lebah	2–1	Persidom
	Report

Gelora 17 Desember Stadium, Mataram City

== Knockout round ==
=== Bracket ===
If the match ends in a draw after normal time, no extra time will be played. A penalty shootout will take place to determine the winner.

Semi-finals
12 November – Mataram City
PS Hamzanwadi	1 (1)
Lebah	1 (4)
13 November – Mataram City
PS Mataram	0 (4)
Persebi	0 (1)

Final
15 November – Mataram City
Lebah	1 (3)
PS Mataram	1 (4)
Third place play-off
14 November – Mataram City
PS Hamzanwadi	2
Persebi	4

=== Semi-finals ===
12 November 2023
13.45 WITA (UTC+8)

PS Hamzanwadi	1–1	Lebah
	Report
Penalties
	1–4

Gelora 17 Desember Stadium, Mataram City

13 November 2023
15.30 WITA (UTC+8)

PS Mataram	0–0	Persebi
	Report
Penalties
	4–1

Gelora 17 Desember Stadium, Mataram City

=== Third place play-off ===
14 November 2023
15.30 WITA (UTC+8)

PS Hamzanwadi	2–4	Persebi
	Report

Gelora 17 Desember Stadium, Mataram City

=== Final ===
15 November 2023
15.30 WITA (UTC+8)

Lebah	1–1	PS Mataram
	Report
Penalties
	3–4

Gelora 17 Desember Stadium, Mataram City

== Qualification to the national phase ==
Team	Method of qualification	Date of qualification	Qualified to
PS Mataram	2023 Liga 3 West Nusa Tenggara champions	15 November 2023	2023–24 Liga 3 National Phase

== See also ==
- 2023 Liga 3 Bali
- 2023 Liga 3 East Nusa Tenggara
