= 2010–11 Liga Indonesia Second Division =

Liga Indonesia Second Division
- Season: 2010–11
- Teams: 78
- Champions: Persap Purbalingga
- Promoted: Persap Purbalingga; PS Bungo; Persiks Kuantan Singingi; PS Pidie Jaya; Persal South Aceh; Persekap Pasuruan; Perseba Bangkalan; Persenga Nganjuk; Persisum Sumbawa; PS Penajam North Paser; Persewar Waropen; Perseka Kaimana
- Relegated: Third Division
- Matches: 161
- Goals: 426 (2.65 per match)

Liga Indonesia Second Division (Indonesian: Divisi Dua Liga Indonesia) is the fourth level football league in Indonesian football competition system. Currently, this competition, along with First Division and Third Division, is managed by the Amateur League Board of the Football Association of Indonesia (PSSI).

== First round ==
Group I: Bea Cukai Stadium, East Jakarta

Pos	Team	Pld	W	D	L	GF	GA	GD	Pts
1	Medan United	2	1	1	0	7	1	+6	4
2	Perskas Subulussalam	2	1	0	1	5	9	−4	3
3	PSSD Dairi	2	0	1	1	2	4	−2	1
4	PSAU North Aceh (W)	0	–	–	–	–	–	—	0
5	Persabar West Aceh (W)	0	–	–	–	–	–	—	0

(W) Withdrew

Group II: University of Riau Field, Pekanbaru

Pos	Team	Pld	W	D	L	GF	GA	GD	Pts
1	PS Pidie Jaya	3	2	0	1	4	3	+1	6
2	Persal South Aceh	3	1	2	0	7	5	+2	5
3	Persibamer Bener Meriah	3	1	1	1	4	5	−1	4
4	PSTS Tanjungbalai	3	0	1	2	3	5	−2	1

Group III: Rumbai Stadium, Pekanbaru

Pos	Team	Pld	W	D	L	GF	GA	GD	Pts
1	Persikalis Bengkalis	3	3	0	0	7	0	+7	9
2	Persiks Kuantan Singingi	3	0	2	1	4	6	−2	2
3	Persis Solok	3	0	2	1	3	5	−2	2
4	Persibri Batanghari	3	0	2	1	5	8	−3	2
5	PS Muaro Jambi (W)	0	–	–	–	–	–	—	0

(W) Withdrew

Group IV: Bukik Bunian Stadium, Agam Regency

Pos	Team	Pld	W	D	L	GF	GA	GD	Pts
1	Poslab Labuhanbatu	3	1	2	0	2	0	+2	5
2	PS West Pasaman	3	1	2	0	1	0	+1	5
3	PS Kerinci	3	1	1	1	2	2	0	4
4	PS Serdang Bedagai	3	0	1	2	1	4	−3	1

Group V: Bangko, Jambi

Pos	Team	Pld	W	D	L	GF	GA	GD	Pts
1	Persisko Bangko	1	?	?	?	?	?	—	0
2	PS Bungo	1	?	?	?	?	?	—	0
3	PSKB Binjai (W)	0	–	–	–	–	–	—	0
4	PES Pessel (W)	0	–	–	–	–	–	—	0

(W) Withdrew

Group VI: Goentoer Darjono Stadium, Purbalingga

Pos	Team	Pld	W	D	L	GF	GA	GD	Pts
1	Persap Purbalingga	3	3	0	0	9	0	+9	9
2	Persibas Banyumas	3	2	0	1	8	3	+5	6
3	Persekap Pekalongan	3	1	0	2	1	10	−9	3
4	Persigar Garut	3	0	0	3	1	6	−5	0
5	Persikas Semarang Regency (W)	0	–	–	–	–	–	—	0

(W) Withdrew

Group VII: Cendrawasih Stadium, West Jakarta

Pos	Team	Pld	W	D	L	GF	GA	GD	Pts
1	Persipo Purwakarta	3	2	1	0	6	3	+3	7
2	Perserang Serang	3	1	1	1	4	4	0	4
3	PSJS South Jakarta	3	1	0	2	2	4	−2	3
4	Persija Barat	3	1	0	2	3	5	−2	3

Group VIII: Taruna Stadium, Sragen

Pos	Team	Pld	W	D	L	GF	GA	GD	Pts
1	PSISra Sragen	2	1	1	0	5	3	+2	4
2	Persitas Tasikmalaya	2	1	1	0	3	2	+1	4
3	Persikotas Tasikmalaya	2	0	0	2	1	4	−3	0
4	Persipan Pandeglang (W)	0	–	–	–	–	–	—	0

(W) Withdrew

Group IX: Anjukladang Stadium, Nganjuk

Pos	Team	Pld	W	D	L	GF	GA	GD	Pts
1	Persenga Nganjuk	3	2	1	0	7	3	+4	7
2	PSGC Ciamis	3	1	1	1	6	5	+1	4
3	Protaba Bantul	3	1	0	2	3	5	−2	3
4	Persinga Ngawi	3	1	0	2	3	6	−3	3

Group X: Main Stadium Bangkalan, Bangkalan Regency and Bumi Moro Field, Surabaya

Pos	Team	Pld	W	D	L	GF	GA	GD	Pts
1	Perseba Bangkalan	3	2	1	0	12	1	+11	7
2	Persekap Pasuruan	3	2	1	0	5	1	+4	7
3	PSISa Salatiga	3	1	0	2	2	8	−6	3
4	Persesa Sampang	3	0	0	3	0	9	−9	0

Group XI: Merdeka Stadium, Jombang

Pos	Team	Pld	W	D	L	GF	GA	GD	Pts
1	PSID Jombang	3	2	1	0	4	1	+3	7
2	Perseta Tulungagung	3	1	1	1	4	3	+1	4
3	Surabaya Muda	3	1	1	1	2	2	0	4
4	Persekama Madiun	3	0	1	2	0	4	−4	1

Group XII: Agrowisata Field and Brantas Stadium, Batu

Pos	Team	Pld	W	D	L	GF	GA	GD	Pts
1	Persikoba Batu	3	2	0	1	6	1	+5	6
2	Persebo Bondowoso	3	2	0	1	5	3	+2	6
3	Persikapro Probolinggo	3	1	1	1	2	3	−1	4
4	Persika Karanganyar	3	0	1	2	1	7	−6	1

Group XIII: Batunirwala Stadium, Alor (first round) and GOR 17 Desember Stadium, Mataram (second round)

Pos	Team	Pld	W	D	L	GF	GA	GD	Pts
1	Persap Alor Pantar	3	3	0	0	3	2	+1	9
2	Persisum Sumbawa	3	1	1	1	4	2	+2	4
3	Perslotim East Lombok	3	1	0	2	2	4	−2	3
4	PS Mataram	3	0	1	2	1	3	−2	1
5	Persekobi Bima (W)	0	–	–	–	–	–	—	0

(W) Withdrew

* Standings after first round & group winners qualify directly for the fourth round

Group XIV: Sangatta Main Stadium, Sangatta

Pos	Team	Pld	W	D	L	GF	GA	GD	Pts
1	Persikutim East Kutai	3	3	0	0	7	1	+6	9
2	Persehan Marabahan	3	1	1	1	4	4	0	4
3	Persetala Tanah Laut	3	1	1	1	2	2	0	4
4	PS PU Bontang	3	0	0	3	1	7	−6	0

Group XV: Balipat Stadium, Tapin Regency

Pos	Team	Pld	W	D	L	GF	GA	GD	Pts
1	PS Penajam North Paser	2	1	1	0	8	2	+6	4
2	PS Kab. Tapin	2	1	1	0	1	1	0	4
3	PSN Nunukan	2	0	0	2	1	7	−6	0
4	Sambung Putra Mountain (W)	0	–	–	–	–	–	—	0
5	PSTK Tarakan (W)	0	–	–	–	–	–	—	0

(W) Withdrew

Group XVI: Kaimana Stadium, Kaimana

Pos	Team	Pld	W	D	L	GF	GA	GD	Pts
1	Persika Kaimana	1	1	0	0	2	1	+1	3
2	Persifa Fakfak	1	0	0	1	1	2	−1	0
3	Persidago Gorontalo (W)	0	–	–	–	–	–	—	0
4	Persma Manado (S)	0	–	–	–	–	–	—	0

(S) Suspension from FIFA; (W) Withdrew

Group XVII: Cenderawasih Stadium, Biak Numfor

Pos	Team	Pld	W	D	L	GF	GA	GD	Pts
1	Persewar Waropen	1	1	0	0	2	1	+1	3
2	Persemi Mimika	1	0	0	1	1	2	−1	0
3	PSTK Selayar (W)	0	–	–	–	–	–	—	0
4	Persinam Namlea (W)	0	–	–	–	–	–	—	0
5	Persmi Masohi (W)	0	–	–	–	–	–	—	0

(W) Withdrew

Group XVIII: Andi Mattalatta Stadium, Makassar

Pos	Team	Pld	W	D	L	GF	GA	GD	Pts
1	Persiss Sorong	3	2	0	1	4	3	+1	6
2	Persipani Paniai	3	1	2	0	7	5	+2	5
3	PS Boalemo	3	1	1	1	4	5	−1	4
4	Persipare Parepare (W)	0	–	–	–	–	–	—	0

(W) Withdrew

== Second round ==
Group A: Tugu Stadium, North Jakarta

Pos	Team	Pld	W	D	L	GF	GA	GD	Pts
1	PS Pidie Jaya	2	2	0	0	4	2	+2	6
2	Persal South Aceh	2	1	0	1	2	3	−1	3
3	Medan United	2	0	0	2	0	1	−1	0
4	Perskas Subulussalam (W)	0	–	–	–	–	–	—	0

(W) Withdrew

Group B: Cendrawasih Stadium, West Jakarta

Pos	Team	Pld	W	D	L	GF	GA	GD	Pts
1	Poslab Labuhanbatu	1	1	0	0	1	0	+1	3
2	Persiks Kuantan Singingi	1	0	0	1	0	1	−1	0
3	Persikalis Bengkalis (W)	0	–	–	–	–	–	—	0

(W) Withdrew

Group C: New Serunai Stadium, Bungo

Pos	Team	Pld	W	D	L	GF	GA	GD	Pts
1	PS Bungo	2	2	0	0	5	0	+5	6
2	PS West Pasaman	2	0	1	1	1	3	−2	1
3	PS Bangko	2	0	1	1	1	4	−3	1

Group D: Purnawarman Stadium, Purwakarta

Pos	Team	Pld	W	D	L	GF	GA	GD	Pts
1	Persap Purbalingga	3	2	1	0	4	1	+3	7
2	Persibas Banyumas	3	1	1	1	2	2	0	4
3	Perserang Serang	3	1	0	2	3	5	−2	3
4	Persipo Purwakarta	3	0	2	1	1	2	−1	2

Group E: Anjukladang Stadium, Nganjuk

Pos	Team	Pld	W	D	L	GF	GA	GD	Pts
1	Persenga Nganjuk	3	3	0	0	11	3	+8	9
2	PSGC Ciamis	3	1	1	1	8	6	+2	4
3	PSISra Sragen	3	1	1	1	5	6	−1	4
4	Persitas Tasikmalaya	3	0	0	3	4	13	−9	0

Group F: Bumi Moro Field, Surabaya

Pos	Team	Pld	W	D	L	GF	GA	GD	Pts
1	Persekap Pasuruan	2	1	1	0	4	0	+4	4
2	Perseba Bangkalan	2	1	1	0	2	0	+2	4
3	Persebo Bondowoso	2	0	0	2	0	6	−6	0

Group G: Rejoagung Stadium, Tulungagung

Pos	Team	Pld	W	D	L	GF	GA	GD	Pts
1	Perseta Tulungagung	2	1	1	0	2	1	+1	4
2	PSID Jombang	2	1	0	1	1	1	0	3
3	Persikoba Batu	2	0	1	1	1	2	−1	1

Group H: Nipahnipah Stadium, Penajam North Paser

Pos	Team	Pld	W	D	L	GF	GA	GD	Pts
1	PS Penajam North Paser	3	3	0	0	6	0	+6	9
2	PS Kab. Tapin	3	1	1	1	4	3	+1	4
3	Persikutim East Kutai	3	1	1	1	2	3	−1	4
4	Persehan Marabahan	3	0	0	3	1	7	−6	0

Group I: Kaimana Stadium, Kaimana

Pos	Team	Pld	W	D	L	GF	GA	GD	Pts
1	Perseka Kaimana	2	1	1	0	3	1	+2	4
2	Persiss Sorong	2	1	1	0	3	1	+2	4
3	Persemi Mimika	2	0	0	2	0	4	−4	0

Group J: Cendrawasih Stadium, Biak Numfor

Pos	Team	Pld	W	D	L	GF	GA	GD	Pts
1	Persewar Waropen	2	1	1	0	4	3	+1	4
2	Persipani Paniai	2	0	2	0	4	4	0	2
3	Persifa Fakfak	2	0	1	1	3	4	−1	1

== Third round ==
- Qualify team (after 15 Oktober): PS Bungo and PS West Pasaman (Group C; Sumatra zone), Persap Purbalingga and Persibas Banyumas (Group D; Java zone), Persenga Nganjuk and PSGC Ciamis (Group E; Java zone), Persekap Pasuruan and Perseba Bangkalan (Group F; Java zone), Perseta Tulungagung and PSID Jombang (Group G; Java zone), PS Penajam North Paser (Group H; Kalimantan zone), Perseka Kaimana dan Persemi Mimika (Group I; Papua zone).

The third round of the Second Division competition will consist of 18 teams divided into four groups. Namely, the group K, L, M, and N. Group K will consist of six teams, while three other groups each containing four teams.

Sumatra zone

(best 4 team qualify for 4th round and Promoted.)

Group K in Kuantan Singingi

- PS Pidie Jaya
- Persiks Kuantan Singingi
- PS Bungo
- Persal South Aceh
- PS West Pasaman
- Poslab Labuhanbatu

Java zone

(best 4 team qualify for 4th round and Promoted.)

(competition play with home tournament system in 2 group league format.)

Group L in Nganjuk

- Persap Purbalingga
- Persenga Nganjuk
- Persibas Banyumas
- PSGC Ciamis

Group M in Jenggala Stadium, Sidoarjo

- Persekap Pasuruan
- Perseba Bangkalan
- Perseta Tulungagung
- PSID Jombang

Kalimantan zone

(Champions team qualify for 4th round and Promoted.)

(this competition is a second round for this zone.)

- PS Penajam North Paser
- Persikutim East Kutai
- PS Kab. Tapin
- Persehan Marabahan

Southeast Nusa zone

(Champions team qualify for 4th round and Promoted.)

(competition play with home and away system in league format.)

(this competition is a qualification tournament for this zone.)

- Persisum Sumbawa
- Persap Alor Pantar
- Perslotim East Lombok
- Persekobi Bima
- PS Mataram
- Eastern Indonesia (Sulawesi
- West Papua
- Papua) zone

(best 2 team qualify for 4th round and Promoted.)

Group N in Biak Numfor

- Perseka Kaimana (West Papua)
- Persewar Waropen (Papua) (2010 Third Division champion)
- Persiss Sorong (West Papua)
- Persemi Mimika (disqualification) (Papua)
- Persipani Paniai (Papua)
- Persidago Gorontalo (retreat) (Gorontalo)
- Persma Manado (disqualification) (North Sulawesi)

Bold is team promoted to 2011 First Division.

== Fourth round ==
Qualify teams:

- Sumatra zone
  - PS Bungo
  - Persiks Kuantan Singingi
  - PS Pidie Jaya
  - Persal South Aceh
- Java zone
  - Persenga Nganjuk
  - Persap Purbalingga
  - Perseba Bangkalan
  - Persekap Pasuruan
- Kalimantan zone
  - PS Penajam North Paser
- Nusa Tenggara Islands zone
  - Persisum Sumbawa
- East Indonesia zone
  - Persewar Waropen
  - Perseka Kaimana

Group I: New Serunai Stadium, Bungo Regency

Pos	Team	Pld	W	D	L	GF	GA	GD	Pts
1	PS Bungo	2	1	1	0	8	3	+5	4
2	Persiks Kuantan Singingi	2	1	0	1	2	6	−4	3
3	PS Pidie Jaya	2	0	1	1	2	3	−1	1
4	Persal South Aceh (W)	0	–	–	–	–	–	—	0

(W) Withdrew

Group II: Goentoer Darjono Stadium, Purbalingga, schedules held in 3–10 January 2011.

Pos	Team	Pld	W	D	L	GF	GA	GD	Pts
1	Persap Purbalingga	3	3	0	0	7	1	+6	9
2	Persenga Nganjuk	3	1	1	1	4	6	−2	4
3	Perseba Bangkalan	3	0	2	1	3	4	−1	2
4	Persekap Pasuruan	3	0	1	2	1	4	−3	1

Group III: Cenderawasih Stadium, Biak Numfor

Pos	Team	Pld	W	D	L	GF	GA	GD	Pts
1	Persewar Waropen	2	2	0	0	6	0	+6	6
2	Perseka Kaimana	2	1	0	1	6	4	+2	3
3	PS Penajam North Paser	2	0	0	2	0	8	−8	0
4	Persisum Sumbawa (W)	0	–	–	–	–	–	—	0

(W) Withdrew

Best Runner-up Classification
Pos	Team	Pld	W	D	L	GF	GA	GD	Pts
1	Perseka Kaimana	2	1	0	1	6	4	+2	3
2	Persiks Kuantan Singingi	2	1	0	1	2	6	−4	3
3	Persenga Nganjuk	2	0	1	1	2	5	−3	1 (Note: Points after minus one game to equalize the number of matches with the other runners-up team.)

== Fifth round ==
Participate is 3 group winner and 1 best runner-up from third round. Total 4 clubs will participate in this round.

=== Qualify teams ===
- PS Bungo
- Persewar Waropen
- Persap Purbalingga
- Perseka Kaimana

=== Knockout phase ===
Semi-finals
16 January 2011 - Lebak Bulus, South Jakarta
Persewar	4
Perseka	0
16 January 2011 - Lebak Bulus, South Jakarta
PS Bungo	0
Persap	2

Final
18 January 2011 - Lebak Bulus, South Jakarta
Persewar	1
Persap	2

Semi-finals

16 January 2011
15:30 WIB

Persewar	4–0	Perseka
Mahmudin 5'; Kipping 33'; Kurni (yellow card) ??'; Samberbori 59'; Jefri 62'; Rumbiak (yellow card) ??'	Report	(yellow card) ??' F. Salu

Lebak Bulus Stadium, South Jakarta
Referee: Kasnari (Jakarta)
16 January 2011
19:00 WIB

PS Bungo	0–2 (a.e.t.)	Persap
Nurdiyanto (yellow card) ??' (yellow-red card) ??'	Report	108' Saiful; 119' (o.g.) Awaludin

Lebak Bulus Stadium, South Jakarta
Referee: Febi Kurniawan

Final

18 January 2011
15:00 WIB

Persewar	1–2 (a.e.t.)	Persap
Peter (yellow card) 31'; Yohanis (yellow card) 54'; Warabay 60'; Mardiansyah (yellow card) 87'; Jefri (yellow card) 49' (yellow-red card) 100'	Report	33' Hermawan; (yellow card) 49' Narto; (yellow card) 79' Willi; (yellow card) 108' Hermawan; 110' Galih

Lebak Bulus Stadium, South Jakarta
Referee: Febi Kurniawan

Champion
