= 2024–25 Liga 4 West Nusa Tenggara =

Liga 4 West Nusa Tenggara
- Season: 2024–25
- Dates: 18 January – 24 February 2025
- Champions: Persidom (1st title)
- National phase: Persidom
- Matches: 47
- Goals: 143 (3.04 per match)
- Biggest win: Cordova University 0–6 Persidom (29 January 2025)
- Highest scoring: Bima United 2–6 Persebi Bima (28 January 2025); Garuda Muda 2–6 PS Mataram (3 February 2025)

The 2024–25 Liga 4 West Nusa Tenggara was the inaugural season of Liga 4 West Nusa Tenggara after the structural changes of Indonesian football competition and serves as a qualifying round for the national phase of the 2024–25 Liga 4. The competition is organised by the West Nusa Tenggara Provincial PSSI Association.

== Teams ==
=== Participating teams ===
A total of 20 teams are competing in this season.

| No | Team | Location | 2023 season |
Lombok Island zone
| 1 | Garuda Muda | West Lombok Regency | Second round (3rd in Group E) |
| 2 | Perslobar | West Lombok Regency | Second round (3rd in Group F) |
| 3 | Bintang Ampenan | Mataram City | First round (3rd in Group A) |
| 4 | INFA | Mataram City | First round (6th in Group A) |
| 5 | PS Bima Sakti | Mataram City | First round (4th in Group A) |
| 6 | PS Fatahillah 354 | Mataram City | — |
| 7 | PS Mataram | Mataram City | Champions |
| 8 | PS Selaparang Raya | Mataram City | First round (7th in Group A) |
| 9 | Redwood | Mataram City | — |
| 10 | Mandalika | Central Lombok Regency | First round (3rd in Group B) |
| 11 | PSLT | Central Lombok Regency | First round (6th in Group B) |
| 12 | Anzala | East Lombok Regency | — |
| 13 | Perslotim | East Lombok Regency | First round (4th in Group B) |

| No | Team | Location | 2023 season |
Sumbawa Island zone
| 14 | Cordova University | West Sumbawa Regency | First round (5th in Group C) |
| 15 | PS Sumbawa | Sumbawa Regency | First round (6th in Group C) |
| 16 | Persidom | Dompu Regency | Second round (4th in Group F) |
| 17 | Persebi Bima | Bima Regency | Third place |
| 18 | Bima United | Bima City | First round (5th in Group D) |
| 19 | Galaxy | Bima City | First round (4th in Group D) |
| 20 | Persekobi | Bima City | First round (3rd in Group D) |

== Schedule ==
The schedule of the competition is as follows.

| Round | Matchday | Date | | | | |
| First round | —N/a | Lombok Island zone | | | Sumbawa Island zone | |
| First round | —N/a | Group A | Group B | Group C | Group D | Group E |
|---|---|---|---|---|---|---|
| First round | Matchday 1 | 18 January 2025 | 19 January 2025 | 21 January 2025 | 25 January 2025 | 26 January 2025 |
| First round | Matchday 2 | 20 January 2025 | 22 January 2025 | 24 January 2025 | 27 January 2025 | 28 January 2025 |
| First round | Matchday 3 | 23 January 2025 | 26 January 2025 | 28 January 2025 | 29 January 2025 | 30 January 2025 |
| First round | Matchday 4 | 25 January 2025 | — | | | |
| First round | Matchday 5 | 27 January 2025 | — | | | |
| Second round | —N/a | Lombok Island zone | | | Sumbawa Island zone | |
| Second round | Matchday 1 | 30 January 2025 | | | — | |
| Second round | Matchday 2 | 1 February 2025 | | | — | |
| Second round | Matchday 3 | 3 February 2025 | | | — | |
| Second round | Zonal play-off | 5 February 2025 | | | 1 February 2025 | |
| Final round | Matchday 1 | 20 February 2025 | | | | |
| Final round | Matchday 2 | 22 February 2025 | | | | |
| Final round | Matchday 3 | 24 February 2025 | | | | |

== Lombok Island zone ==
=== First round ===
A total of 13 teams will be drawn into 3 groups based on the geographical location of their home bases.

The first round will be played in a home tournament format of single round-robin matches. The top two teams of each group will qualify for the second round.

==== Group A ====
All matches will be held at Gelora 17 December Stadium, Mataram.

| Pos | Team | Pld | W | D | L | GF | GA | GD | Pts | Qualification | PLT | RED | FTH | MDL | ANZ |
|---|---|---|---|---|---|---|---|---|---|---|---|---|---|---|---|
| 1 | PSLT | 4 | 3 | 1 | 0 | 9 | 2 | +7 | 10 | Qualification to the Second round | — | 1–1 | — | — | 4–0 |
| 2 | Redwood | 4 | 2 | 2 | 0 | 6 | 4 | +2 | 8 | Qualification to the Second round | — | — | — | 2–1 | 3–2 |
| 3 | PS Fatahillah 354 | 4 | 1 | 1 | 2 | 4 | 5 | −1 | 4 | | 1–3 | 0–0 | — | 2–0 | — |
| 4 | Mandalika | 4 | 1 | 0 | 3 | 3 | 5 | −2 | 3 (Note: Ranked on head-to-head points: Mandalika 3, Anzala 0.) | | 0–1 | — | — | — | — |
| 5 | Anzala | 4 | 1 | 0 | 3 | 4 | 10 | −6 | 3 | | — | — | 2–1 | 0–2 | — |

Source: Liga 4 West Nusa Tenggara
Legend: Blue = home team win; Yellow = draw; Red = away team win.
Rules for classification: 1) Points; 2) Head-to-head points; 3) Head-to-head goal difference; 4) Head-to-head goals scored; 5) Goal difference; 6) Goals scored; 7) Fair-play points; 8) Draw.
Notes:

Group A Matches

Matchday 1 (18 January)
18 January 2025
14:30 UTC+8

| Mandalika | 0–1 | PSLT |
|---|---|---|
| | Report |

Gelora 17 December Stadium, Mataram
18 January 2025
16:15 UTC+8

| Redwood | 3–2 | Anzala |
|---|---|---|
| | Report |

Gelora 17 December Stadium, Mataram

Matchday 2 (20 January)
20 January 2025
14:30 UTC+8

| PSLT | 4–0 | Anzala |
|---|---|---|
| | Report |

Gelora 17 December Stadium, Mataram
20 January 2025
16:15 UTC+8

| PS Fatahillah 354 | 2–0 | Mandalika |
|---|---|---|
| | Report |

Gelora 17 December Stadium, Mataram

Matchday 3 (23 January)
23 January 2025
14:30 UTC+8

| Anzala | 2–1 | PS Fatahillah 354 |
|---|---|---|
| | Report |

Gelora 17 December Stadium, Mataram
23 January 2025
16:15 UTC+8

| PSLT | 1–1 | Redwood |
|---|---|---|
| | Report |

Gelora 17 December Stadium, Mataram

Matchday 4 (25 January)
25 January 2025
14:30 UTC+8

| PS Fatahillah 354 | 0–0 | Redwood |
|---|---|---|
| | Report |

Gelora 17 December Stadium, Mataram
25 January 2025
16:15 UTC+8

| Anzala | 0–2 | Mandalika |
|---|---|---|
| | Report |

Gelora 17 December Stadium, Mataram

Matchday 5 (27 January)
27 January 2025
14:30 UTC+8

| Redwood | 2–1 | Mandalika |
|---|---|---|
| | Report |

Gelora 17 December Stadium, Mataram
27 January 2025
16:15 UTC+8

| PS Fatahillah 354 | 1–3 | PSLT |
|---|---|---|
| | Report |

Gelora 17 December Stadium, Mataram

==== Group B ====
All matches will be held at Gelora 17 December Stadium, Mataram.

| Pos | Team | Pld | W | D | L | GF | GA | GD | Pts | Qualification | MAT | BIM | INF | SLR |
|---|---|---|---|---|---|---|---|---|---|---|---|---|---|---|
| 1 | PS Mataram | 3 | 3 | 0 | 0 | 8 | 0 | +8 | 9 | Qualification to the Second round | — | 1–0 | — | 5–0 |
| 2 | PS Bima Sakti | 3 | 1 | 1 | 1 | 6 | 4 | +2 | 4 | Qualification to the Second round | — | — | 2–2 | — |
| 3 | INFA | 3 | 1 | 1 | 1 | 5 | 4 | +1 | 4 | | 0–2 | — | — | 3–0 |
| 4 | PS Selaparang Raya | 3 | 0 | 0 | 3 | 1 | 12 | −11 | 0 | | — | 1–4 | — | — |

Source: Liga 4 West Nusa Tenggara
Legend: Blue = home team win; Yellow = draw; Red = away team win.
Rules for classification: 1) Points; 2) Head-to-head points; 3) Head-to-head goal difference; 4) Head-to-head goals scored; 5) Goal difference; 6) Goals scored; 7) Fair-play points; 8) Draw.

Group B Matches

Matchday 1 (19 January)
19 January 2025
14:30 UTC+8

| PS Selaparang Raya | 1–4 | PS Bima Sakti |
|---|---|---|
| | Report |

Gelora 17 December Stadium, Mataram
19 January 2025
16:15 UTC+8

| INFA | 0–2 | PS Mataram |
|---|---|---|
| | Report |

Gelora 17 December Stadium, Mataram

Matchday 2 (22 January)
22 January 2025
14:30 UTC+8

| PS Bima Sakti | 2–2 | INFA |
|---|---|---|
| | Report |

Gelora 17 December Stadium, Mataram
22 January 2025
16:15 UTC+8

| PS Mataram | 5–0 | PS Selaparang Raya |
|---|---|---|
| | Report |

Gelora 17 December Stadium, Mataram

Matchday 3 (26 January)
26 January 2025
14:30 UTC+8

| INFA | 3–0 | PS Selaparang Raya |
|---|---|---|
| | Report |

Gelora 17 December Stadium, Mataram
26 January 2025
16:15 UTC+8

| PS Mataram | 1–0 | PS Bima Sakti |
|---|---|---|
| | Report |

Gelora 17 December Stadium, Mataram

==== Group C ====
All matches will be held at Gelora 17 December Stadium, Mataram.

| Pos | Team | Pld | W | D | L | GF | GA | GD | Pts | Qualification | GAR | LBR | LTM | BIN |
|---|---|---|---|---|---|---|---|---|---|---|---|---|---|---|
| 1 | Garuda Muda | 3 | 1 | 1 | 1 | 3 | 3 | 0 | 4 (Note: Tied on head-to-head points and head-to-head goal difference. Head-to-head goals scored: Garuda Muda 3, Perslobar 2, Perslotim 2.) | Qualification to the Second round | — | 2–1 | 1–2 | — |
| 2 | Perslobar | 3 | 1 | 1 | 1 | 4 | 4 | 0 | 4 | Qualification to the Second round | — | — | 1–0 | 2–2 |
| 3 | Perslotim | 3 | 1 | 1 | 1 | 2 | 2 | 0 | 4 | | — | — | — | 0–0 |
| 4 | Bintang Ampenan | 3 | 0 | 3 | 0 | 2 | 2 | 0 | 3 | | 0–0 | — | — | — |

Source: Liga 4 West Nusa Tenggara
Legend: Blue = home team win; Yellow = draw; Red = away team win.
Rules for classification: 1) Points; 2) Head-to-head points; 3) Head-to-head goal difference; 4) Head-to-head goals scored; 5) Goal difference; 6) Goals scored; 7) Fair-play points; 8) Draw.
Notes:

Group C Matches

Matchday 1 (21 January)
21 January 2025
14:30 UTC+8

| Perslotim | 0–0 | Bintang Ampenan |
|---|---|---|
| | Report |

Gelora 17 December Stadium, Mataram
21 January 2025
16:15 UTC+8

| Garuda Muda | 2–1 | Perslobar |
|---|---|---|
| | Report |

Gelora 17 December Stadium, Mataram

Matchday 2 (24 January)
24 January 2025
14:30 UTC+8

| Bintang Ampenan | 0–0 | Garuda Muda |
|---|---|---|
| | Report |

Gelora 17 December Stadium, Mataram
24 January 2025
16:15 UTC+8

| Perslobar | 1–0 | Perslotim |
|---|---|---|
| | Report |

Gelora 17 December Stadium, Mataram

Matchday 3 (28 January)
28 January 2025
14:30 UTC+8

| Garuda Muda | 1–2 | Perslotim |
|---|---|---|
| | Report |

Gelora 17 December Stadium, Mataram
28 January 2025
16:15 UTC+8

| Perslobar | 2–2 | Bintang Ampenan |
|---|---|---|
| | Report |

Gelora 17 December Stadium, Mataram

=== Second round ===
==== Group F ====
All matches will be held at Gelora 17 December Stadium, Mataram.

| Pos | Team | Pld | W | D | L | GF | GA | GD | Pts | Qualification | LBR | PLT | BIM |
|---|---|---|---|---|---|---|---|---|---|---|---|---|---|
| 1 | Perslobar | 2 | 1 | 1 | 0 | 4 | 1 | +3 | 4 | Qualification to the Lombok Island zonal play-off | — | 3–0 | — |
| 2 | PSLT | 2 | 1 | 0 | 1 | 1 | 3 | −2 | 3 | Qualification to the Lombok Island zonal play-off | — | — | 1–0 |
| 3 | PS Bima Sakti | 2 | 0 | 1 | 1 | 1 | 2 | −1 | 1 | | 1–1 | — | — |

Source: Liga 4 West Nusa Tenggara
Legend: Blue = home team win; Yellow = draw; Red = away team win.
Rules for classification: 1) Points; 2) Head-to-head points; 3) Head-to-head goal difference; 4) Head-to-head goals scored; 5) Goal difference; 6) Goals scored; 7) Fair-play points; 8) Draw.

Group F Matches

Matchday 1 (30 January)
30 January 2025
14:15 UTC+8

| PSLT | 1–0 | PS Bima Sakti |
|---|---|---|
| | Report |

Gelora 17 December Stadium, Mataram

Matchday 2 (1 February)
1 February 2025
16:15 UTC+8

| PS Bima Sakti | 1–1 | Perslobar |
|---|---|---|
| | Report |

Gelora 17 December Stadium, Mataram

Matchday 3 (3 February)
3 February 2025
14:15 UTC+8

| Perslobar | 3–0 | PSLT |
|---|---|---|
| | Report |

Gelora 17 December Stadium, Mataram

==== Group G ====
All matches will be held at Gelora 17 December Stadium, Mataram.

| Pos | Team | Pld | W | D | L | GF | GA | GD | Pts | Qualification | MAT | GAR | RED |
|---|---|---|---|---|---|---|---|---|---|---|---|---|---|
| 1 | PS Mataram | 2 | 2 | 0 | 0 | 7 | 2 | +5 | 6 | Qualification to the Lombok Island zonal play-off | — | — | 1–0 |
| 2 | Garuda Muda | 2 | 1 | 0 | 1 | 5 | 6 | −1 | 3 | Qualification to the Lombok Island zonal play-off | 2–6 | — | — |
| 3 | Redwood | 2 | 0 | 0 | 2 | 0 | 4 | −4 | 0 | | — | 0–3 | — |

Source: Liga 4 West Nusa Tenggara
Legend: Blue = home team win; Yellow = draw; Red = away team win.
Rules for classification: 1) Points; 2) Head-to-head points; 3) Head-to-head goal difference; 4) Head-to-head goals scored; 5) Goal difference; 6) Goals scored; 7) Fair-play points; 8) Draw.

Group F Matches

Matchday 1 (30 January)
30 January 2025
16:15 UTC+8

| PS Mataram | 1–0 | Redwood |
|---|---|---|
| | Report |

Gelora 17 December Stadium, Mataram

Matchday 2 (1 February)
1 February 2025
14:15 UTC+8

| Redwood | 0–3 | Garuda Muda |
|---|---|---|
| | Report |

Gelora 17 December Stadium, Mataram

Matchday 3 (3 February)
3 February 2025
16:15 UTC+8

| Garuda Muda | 2–6 | PS Mataram |
|---|---|---|
| | Report |

Gelora 17 December Stadium, Mataram

=== Lombok Island zonal play-off ===
Winners will qualified to the final round

5 February 2025
14:00 UTC+8

| Perslobar | 1–1 | Garuda Muda |
|---|---|---|
| | Report |
Penalties
| | 5–6 |

Gelora 17 December Stadium, Mataram

5 February 2025
16:00 UTC+8

| PS Mataram | 3–0 | PSLT |
|---|---|---|
| | Report |

Gelora 17 December Stadium, Mataram

== Sumbawa Island zone ==
=== First round ===
A total of 7 teams will be drawn into 3 groups based on the geographical location of their home bases.

The first round will be played in a home tournament format of single round-robin matches. The top two teams of each group will qualify for the second round.

==== Group D ====
All matches will be held at GOR Manuru Kupa Ginte, Dompu.

| Pos | Team | Pld | W | D | L | GF | GA | GD | Pts | Qualification | DOM | GFC | COR |
|---|---|---|---|---|---|---|---|---|---|---|---|---|---|
| 1 | Persidom | 2 | 2 | 0 | 0 | 9 | 0 | +9 | 6 | Qualification to the Sumbawa Island zonal play-off | — | 3–0 | — |
| 2 | Galaxy | 2 | 1 | 0 | 1 | 4 | 3 | +1 | 3 | Qualification to the Sumbawa Island zonal play-off | — | — | 4–0 |
| 3 | Cordova University | 2 | 0 | 0 | 2 | 0 | 10 | −10 | 0 | | 0–6 | — | — |

Source: Liga 4 West Nusa Tenggara
Legend: Blue = home team win; Yellow = draw; Red = away team win.
Rules for classification: 1) Points; 2) Head-to-head points; 3) Head-to-head goal difference; 4) Head-to-head goals scored; 5) Goal difference; 6) Goals scored; 7) Fair-play points; 8) Draw.

Matchday 1 (25 January)
25 January 2025
16:15 UTC+8

| Persidom | 3–0 | Galaxy |
|---|---|---|
| | Report |

GOR Manuru Kupa Ginte Stadium, Dompu

Matchday 2 (27 January)
27 January 2025
16:15 UTC+8

| Galaxy | 4–0 | Cordova University |
|---|---|---|
| | Report |

GOR Manuru Kupa Ginte Stadium, Dompu

Matchday 3 (29 January)
29 January 2025
16:15 UTC+8

| Cordova University | 0–6 | Persidom |
|---|---|---|
| | Report |

GOR Manuru Kupa Ginte Stadium, Dompu

==== Group E ====
All matches will be held at GOR Manuru Kupa Ginte Stadium, Dompu.

| Pos | Team | Pld | W | D | L | GF | GA | GD | Pts | Qualification | PBI | SUM | KOB | BUN |
|---|---|---|---|---|---|---|---|---|---|---|---|---|---|---|
| 1 | Persebi Bima | 3 | 3 | 0 | 0 | 13 | 5 | +8 | 9 | Qualification to the Sumbawa Island zonal play-off | — | 4–1 | 3–2 | — |
| 2 | PS Sumbawa | 3 | 2 | 0 | 1 | 7 | 8 | −1 | 6 | Qualification to the Sumbawa Island zonal play-off | — | — | 2–1 | 4–3 |
| 3 | Persekobi | 3 | 1 | 0 | 2 | 5 | 6 | −1 | 3 | | — | — | — | 2–1 |
| 4 | Bima United | 3 | 0 | 0 | 3 | 6 | 12 | −6 | 0 | | 2–6 | — | — | — |

Source: Liga 4 West Nusa Tenggara
Legend: Blue = home team win; Yellow = draw; Red = away team win.
Rules for classification: 1) Points; 2) Head-to-head points; 3) Head-to-head goal difference; 4) Head-to-head goals scored; 5) Goal difference; 6) Goals scored; 7) Fair-play points; 8) Draw.

Group E Matches

Matchday 1 (26 January)
26 January 2025
14:15 UTC+8

| Persekobi | 2–1 | Bima United |
|---|---|---|
| | Report |

GOR Manuru Kupa Ginte Stadium, Dompu
26 January 2025
16:15 UTC+8

| Persebi Bima | 4–1 | PS Sumbawa |
|---|---|---|
| | Report |

GOR Manuru Kupa Ginte Stadium, Dompu

Matchday 2 (28 January)
28 January 2025
14:15 UTC+8

| Bima United | 2–6 | Persebi Bima |
|---|---|---|
| | Report |

GOR Manuru Kupa Ginte Stadium, Dompu
28 January 2025
16:15 UTC+8

| PS Sumbawa | 2–1 | Persekobi |
|---|---|---|
| | Report |

GOR Manuru Kupa Ginte Stadium, Dompu

Matchday 3 (30 January)
30 January 2025
14:15 UTC+8

| Persebi Bima | 3–2 | Persekobi |
|---|---|---|
| | Report |

GOR Manuru Kupa Ginte Stadium, Dompu
30 January 2025
16:15 UTC+8

| PS Sumbawa | 4–3 | Bima United |
|---|---|---|
| | Report |

GOR Manuru Kupa Ginte Stadium, Dompu

=== Sumbawa Island zonal play-off ===
Winners will qualified to the final round

1 February 2025
14:15 UTC+8

| Persidom | 1–0 | PS Sumbawa |
|---|---|---|
| | Report |

1 February 2025
16:15 UTC+8

| Persebi Bima | 1–0 | Galaxy |
|---|---|---|
| | Report |

== Final round ==
The top 2 teams from the Lombok Island zone and the top 2 teams from the Sumbawa Island zone will compete in a single group. The tournament will be played in a home tournament format with a single round-robin system. The team that finishes in first place will be crowned the champion.

| Pos | Team | Pld | W | D | L | GF | GA | GD | Pts | Qualification | DOM | GAR | MAT | PBI |
|---|---|---|---|---|---|---|---|---|---|---|---|---|---|---|
| 1 | Persidom (C) | 3 | 3 | 0 | 0 | 6 | 0 | +6 | 9 | Qualification for the National phase | — | — | 3–0 (Note: The match was stopped when the score was Persidom 0–1 PS Mataram because the PS Mataram team refused to continue playing. Finally, the West Nusa Tenggara Provincial PSSI Association awarded a 3–0 victory to Persidom.) | — |
| 2 | Garuda Muda (Note: Garuda Muda qualified to the national phase but later withdrew following the passing of their owner.) | 3 | 1 | 0 | 2 | 5 | 7 | −2 | 3 | | 0–1 | — | — | 3–2 |
| 3 | PS Mataram (Note: PS Mataram was deducted three points by the West Nusa Tenggara Provincial PSSI Association Disciplinary Committee.) | 3 | 1 | 1 | 1 | 4 | 5 | −1 | 1 | | — | 4–2 | — | — |
| 4 | Persebi Bima | 3 | 0 | 1 | 2 | 2 | 5 | −3 | 1 | | 0–2 | — | 0–0 | — |

Source: Liga 4 West Nusa Tenggara
Legend: Blue = home team win; Yellow = draw; Red = away team win.
Rules for classification: 1) Points; 2) Head-to-head points; 3) Head-to-head goal difference; 4) Head-to-head goals scored; 5) Goal difference; 6) Goals scored; 7) Fair-play points; 8) Draw.
(C) Champions
Notes:

Matches

Matchday 1 (20 February)
20 February 2025
14:00 UTC+8

| Garuda Muda | 0–1 | Persidom |
|---|---|---|
| | Report |

GOR Manuru Kupa Ginte Stadium, Dompu
20 February 2025
16:00 UTC+8

| Persebi Bima | 0–0 | PS Mataram |
|---|---|---|
| | Report |

GOR Manuru Kupa Ginte Stadium, Dompu

Matchday 2 (22 February)
22 February 2025
14:00 UTC+8

| PS Mataram | 4–2 | Garuda Muda |
|---|---|---|
| | Report |

GOR Manuru Kupa Ginte Stadium, Dompu
20 February 2025
16:00 UTC+8

| Persebi Bima | 0–2 | Persidom |
|---|---|---|
| | Report |

GOR Manuru Kupa Ginte Stadium, Dompu

Matchday 3 (24 February)
24 February 2025
14:00 UTC+8

| Persidom | ~~0–1~~ 3–0 Awarded (Note: The match was stopped when the score was Persidom 0–1 PS Mataram because the PS Mataram team refused to continue playing. Finally, the West Nusa Tenggara Provincial PSSI Association awarded a 3–0 victory to Persidom.) | PS Mataram |

GOR Manuru Kupa Ginte Stadium, Dompu
24 February 2025
16:00 UTC+8

| Garuda Muda | 3–2 | Persebi Bima |

GOR Manuru Kupa Ginte Stadium, Dompu

== See also ==
- 2024–25 Liga 4
