= Darussalam Great Mosque, West Sumbawa =

Mosque in West Sumbawa, West Nusa Tenggara, Indonesia

Darussalam Great Mosque Masjid Agung Darussalam
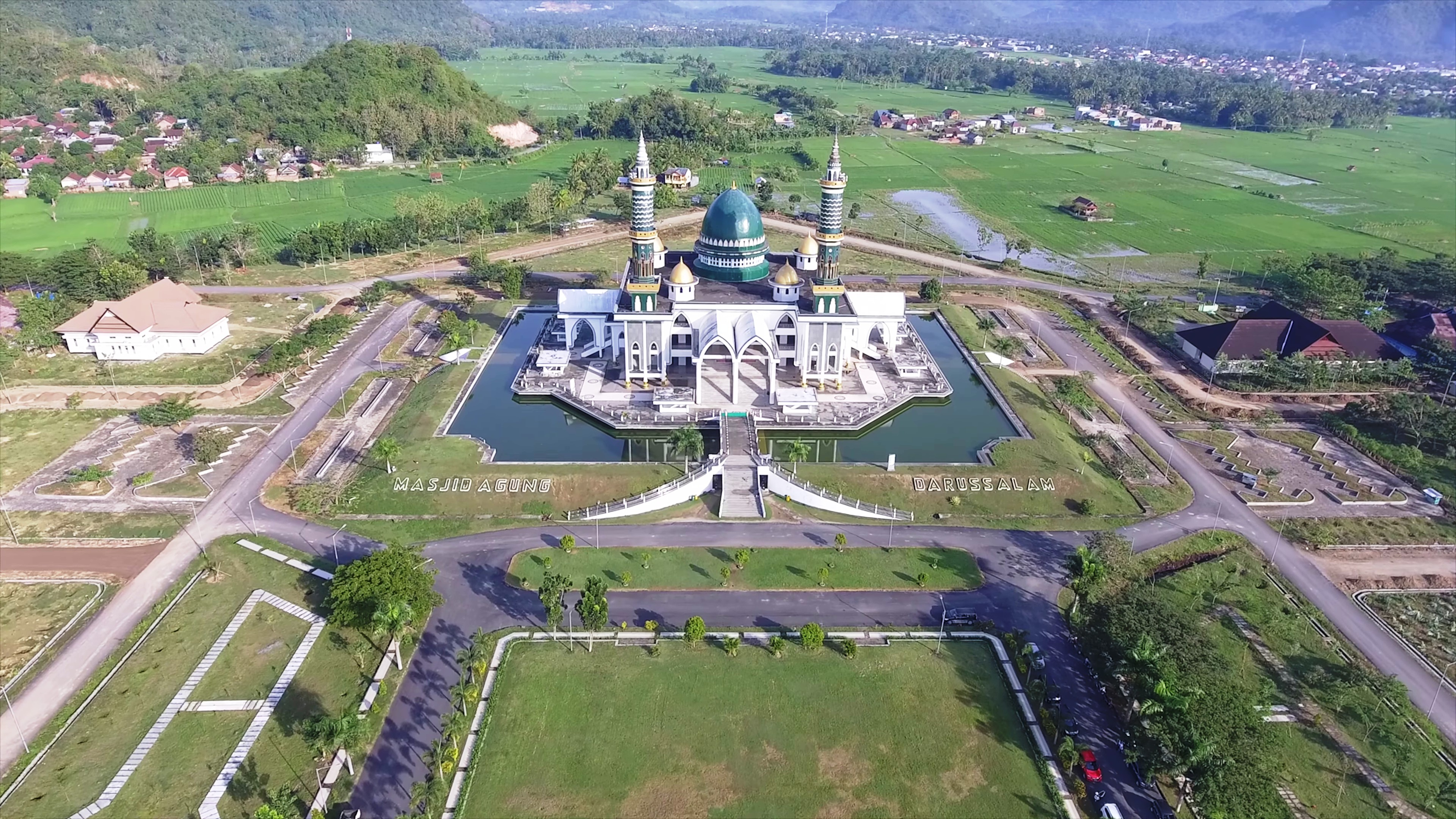

Religion
- Affiliation: Islam
- Branch/tradition: Sunni

Location
- Location: Taliwang, West Sumbawa Regency, Indonesia
- Interactive map of Darussalam Great Mosque; Masjid Agung Darussalam
- Coordinates: 8.753440699999999°S 116.85144399999999°E

Architecture
- Type: Mosque
- Groundbreaking: 2007
- Completed: 2010

The Darussalam Great Mosque (Indonesian: Masjid Agung Darussalam) is a mosque located in Taliwang, West Sumbawa Regency, West Nusa Tenggara, Indonesia. The mosque was constructed between 2007 and 2010. The shape of the building represents various activities of West Sumbawa's government and society.
