= PS Cordova University =

Indonesian football club

- Full name: Persatuan Sepakbola Cordova University
- Nicknames: Laskar Undru (Undru Warriors)
- Founded: 2003; 23 years ago, as KSB Sumbawa Barat; 2022; 4 years ago, as PS Cordova University
- Ground: GOR Taliwang Stadium
- Capacity: 2,000
- Owner: Cordova University
- Chairman: Zulkifli Muhadli
- Manager: Iksan Gumala Putra
- Coach: Mustaqim
- League: Liga 4
- 2024–25: 3rd in Group D, (West Nusa Tenggara zone)
Home colours	Away colours

PS Cordova University (formerly known as PS Sumbawa Barat) is an Indonesian football club based in West Sumbawa, West Nusa Tenggara. Currently the club is playing in the Liga 4.

== History ==
PS Sumbawa Barat logo

In 2011, the club successfully promoted from Liga Indonesia First Division to Liga Indonesia Premier Division. They get third place on the 2011–12 Liga Indonesia Premier Division (LI) first round and then advanced to the second round. Saddam Husain, a native of West Sumbawa who ranks among the top three goal scorers in the 2011–12 Liga Indonesia Premier Division, is the key player.

== Homebase ==
PS Sumbawa Barat was playing their home games in Gelora Turide Stadium, Mataram. After two seasons played in the Mataram (beginning in the 2014 season) the club moved to playing in their hometown in West Sumbawa. This is due to the construction of a new stadium with a capacity of 12,000 spectators in downtown Taliwang; the stadium was named Lalu Magaparang.

== Sponsors ==
PT. Bumi Resources Minerals Tbk. (2011–present)

== Rivalries ==
The club local rival is PS Mataram and Persisum Sumbawa.

== Season-by-season records ==
As PS West Sumbawa

Season	League	Tier	Tms.	Pos.	Piala Indonesia
2009–10	Second Division	4	81	Promoted	–
2010	First Division	3	57	4th, Third round	–
2011–12	Premier Division	2	22	4th, Second round	–
2013	Premier Division	2	39	5th, Group 4	–
2014	Premier Division	2	63	5th, Group 7	–
2015	Premier Division	2	55	did not finish	–
2016	ISC B	2	53	5th, Group 7	–
2017	Liga 2	2	61	6th, Group 7	–
2018	Liga 3	3	32	Eliminated in National zone route	First round
2019	Liga 3	3	32	Eliminated in Provincial round	First round
2020	Liga 3	3	season abandoned		–
2021–22	Liga 3	3	64	Eliminated in Provincial round	–

As PS Cordova University

Season	League	Tier	Tms.	Pos.	Piala Indonesia
2022–23	Liga 3	3	season abandoned		–
2023–24	Liga 3	3	80	Eliminated in Provincial round	–
2024–25	Liga 4	4	64	Eliminated in Provincial round	–
