= Maluk =

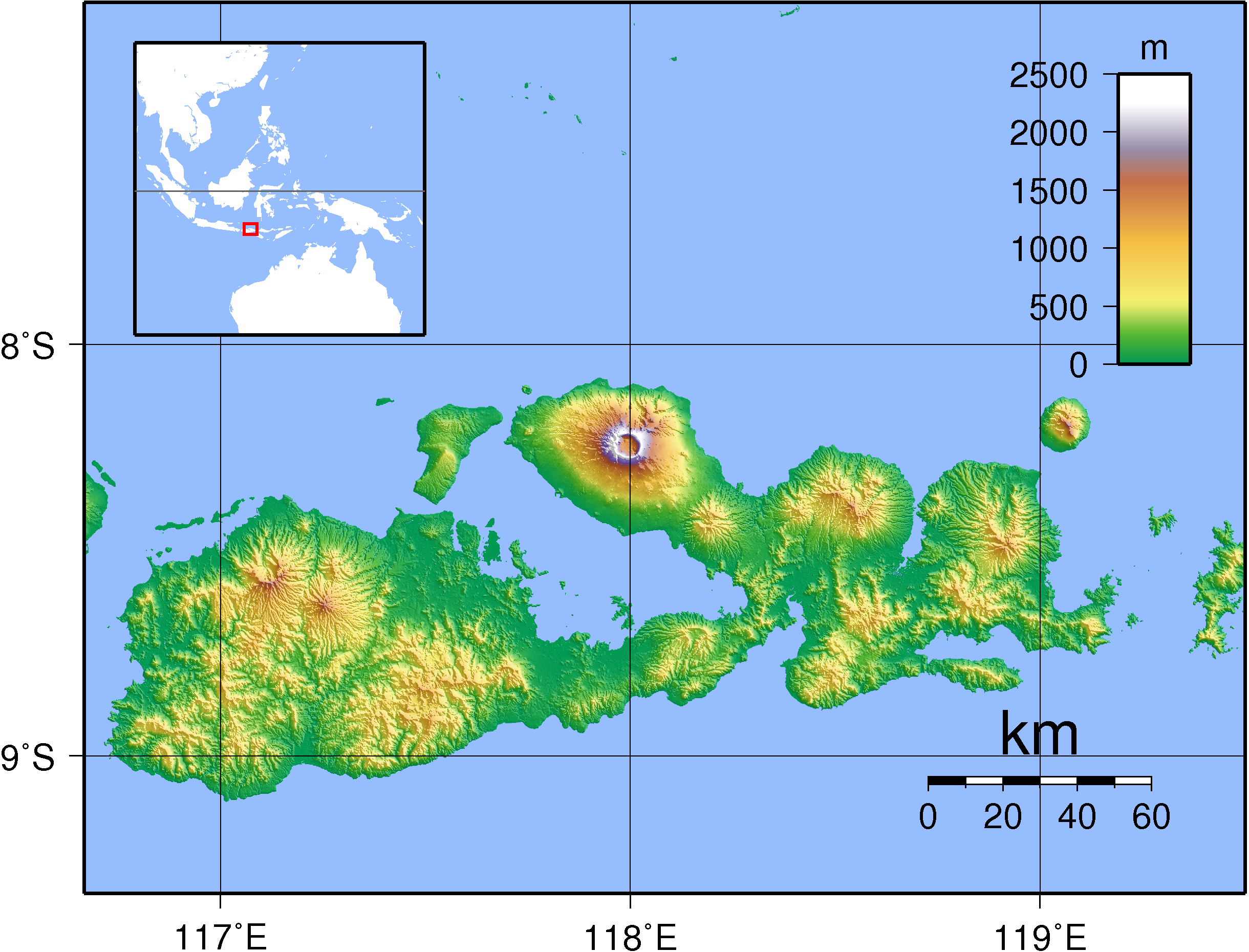
- Location on Sumbawa Island, Indonesia
- Coordinates: 8.893568°S 116.757486°E
- Country: Indonesia
- Province: West Nusa Tenggara
- Regency: West Sumbawa Regency

Area
  - Total: 38.83 km^{2} (14.99 sq mi)

Population (2024)
  - Total: 11,650
  - Density: 300.0/km^{2} (777.1/sq mi)
- Time zone: UTC+8 (WITA)
- Postal Code: 84459
- Area code: (+62) 372
- Vehicle registration: EA

Maluk is an administrative district (kecamatan) in West Sumbawa Regency, part of West Nusa Tenggara Province of Indonesia.
