= Bangko =

District in Riau, Indonesia

- District
- Interactive map of Bangko
- Coordinates: 2°9′24.5448″N 100°47′52.5804″E
- Country: Indonesia
- Province: Riau
- Regency: Rokan Hilir
- Capital: Bagansiapiapi

Area
  - Total: 475.26 km^{2} (183.50 sq mi)

Population (2023)
  - Total: 81,367
  - Density: 171.21/km^{2} (443.42/sq mi)
- Time zone: UTC+07:00 (Western Indonesia Time)
- Postal code: 28911 - 28914

Bangko is an administrative district (kecamatan) in Rokan Hilir Regency, Riau, Indonesia.
