= Lebah F.C. =

Lebah
- Full name: Lebah Football Club
- Nickname: The Bees
- Founded: 2020; 6 years ago
- Ground: Pragas Stadium; Sumbawa Besar, Sumbawa
- Capacity: 1,000
- Manager: Ferdian
- Coach: Kristoforus Jagung Keitimu
- League: Liga 3
- 2023: runner-up (West Nusa tenggara)
- Website: https://sumbawaunited.com
Home colours	Away colours

Lebah Football Club is an Indonesian football club based in Sumbawa Besar, Sumbawa Regency, West Nusa Tenggara. They currently compete in the Liga 3 and their homeground is Pragas Stadium

== Honours ==
- Liga 3 West Nusa Tenggara
  - Runner-up (1): 2023
