= PSTK Tarakan =

Association football team in Indonesia

PSTK
- Full name: Persatuan Sepakbola Tarakan Kota
- Nicknames: Laskar Paguntaka (Paguntaka Warriors)
- Founded: 1980; 46 years ago
- Ground: Datuk Adil Stadium, Tarakan, North Kalimantan
- Capacity: 15,000
- Owner: PSSI Tarakan City
- Manager: Yusuf Ramlan
- Coach: Slamet Riyadi
- League: Liga 3
- 2019: Liga 3, National round, 4th in Group G
| Home colours | Away colours |

Persatuan Sepakbola Tarakan Kota (simply known as PSTK; formerly known as Persita Tarakan and PS Tarakan) is an Indonesian football club based in Tarakan, North Kalimantan. They currently compete in Liga 4 North Kalimantan zone.

== History ==
Founded in the 1980s, they had experienced a golden age in the 1980s and were even respected in the East Kalimantan region. And now PSTK is at the bottom of the last league's tier, Third Division. Starting its journey from the lowest tier of the national football competition (Third Division), PSTK managed to move up to the National Premier Division.

In 2019 season, they won the Liga 3 North Kalimantan zone, and represented the province of North Kalimantan to the national round of Liga 3, they were joined in Group G along with Semeru, Persedikab Kediri, and Persiter Ternate.

== Honours ==
- Liga 3 North Kalimantan
  - Champion (1): 2019
