= PSKT West Sumbawa =

Indonesian football club

- Full name: Persatuan Sepakbola Kemutar Telu Sumbawa Barat
- Nicknames: Lebah Putih (White Hornets)
- Ground: Lalu Magaparang Stadium; West Sumbawa, West Nusa Tenggara
- Capacity: 5,000
- Owner: PSSI West Sumbawa
- Chairman: Musyafirin
- Manager: Abdul Majid
- Coach: Lahmuddin
- League: Liga 4
- 2023: 4th in Group C, (West Nusa Tenggara zone)
Home colours	Away colours

Persatuan Sepakbola Kemutar Telu Sumbawa Barat (simply known as PSKT) is an Indonesian football club based in West Sumbawa Regency, West Nusa Tenggara. They compete in Liga 4, the lowest tier of Indonesian football league system.

== Honours ==
- Liga 3 West Nusa Tenggara
  - Champions (2): 2016, 2017
