= Taliwang =

- Town
- Location of West Sumbawa Regency in West Nusa Tenggara

- Location in Indonesia
- Coordinates: 08°44′01″S 116°52′00″E
- Country: Indonesia
- Province: West Nusa Tenggara
- Regency: West Sumbawa Regency
- Established: April 10, 2002

Area
  - Total: 153.71 km^{2} (59.35 sq mi)

Population (mid 2024 estimate)
  - Total: 60,205
  - Density: 391.68/km^{2} (1,014.4/sq mi)
- Time zone: UTC+8
- License plate: EA
- Website: www.sumbawabaratkab.go.id

Taliwang is a town and an administrative district (kecamatan) which serves as the regency seat of West Sumbawa Regency, on the western coast of the island of Sumbawa. It is the fifth largest town on the island of Sumbawa, part of West Nusa Tenggara Province of Indonesia. The district had a population of 44,136 at the 2010 Census and 55,340 at the 2020 Census; the official estimate as at mid 2024 was 60,205.

== Geography ==
The district is located on the western coast of the Sumbawa island. The town itself lies some miles inland from the coastal outport of Labuhan Balat.

== Communities ==
Taliwang District comprises seven urban villages (kelurahan, identified by asterisk * in the table below) and nine rural villages (desa), listed below with their areas and their populations as officially estimated for mid 2024, all sharing the postcode of 84452.

Kode Wilayah	Name of kelurahan or desa	Area in km^{2}	Pop'n Estimate mid 2024
52.07.02.2009	Lalar Liang	12.24	1,807
52.07.02.2001	Labuhan Lalar	4.44	3,874
52.07.02.1005	Kuang *	3.87	6,911
52.07.02.2010	Labuhan Kertasari	21.69	2,340
52.07.02.1006	Bugis *	2.23	6,256
52.07.02.1007	Dalam *	3.05	4,757
52.07.02.1004	Menala *	6.76	7,530
52.07.02.1008	Sampir *	17.25	4,743
52.07.02.2011	Seloto	25.21	2,475
52.07.02.2013	Tamekan	3.12	1,315
52.07.02.2014	Banjar	9.16	1,807
52.07.02.2015	Batu Putih	10.79	2,278
52.07.02.1012	Telaga Bertong *	22.98	7,442
52.07.02.2020	Sermong	2.00	1,276
52.07.02.1019	Arab Kenangan *	0.30	3,223
52.07.02.2021	Lamunga	8.63	2,171
52.07.02	Totals	153.71	60,205

=== Climate ===
Taliwang has a tropical savanna climate (Köppen Aw) with moderate to little rainfall from April to October and heavy rainfall from November to March.

Climate data for Taliwang
Month	Jan	Feb	Mar	Apr	May	Jun	Jul	Aug	Sep	Oct	Nov	Dec	Year
Mean daily maximum °C (°F)	30.3 (86.5)	30.2 (86.4)	30.7 (87.3)	31.1 (88.0)	30.7 (87.3)	30.1 (86.2)	29.7 (85.5)	30.2 (86.4)	30.8 (87.4)	31.1 (88.0)	30.7 (87.3)	30.4 (86.7)	30.5 (86.9)
Daily mean °C (°F)	26.2 (79.2)	26.2 (79.2)	26.4 (79.5)	26.3 (79.3)	25.7 (78.3)	24.9 (76.8)	24.3 (75.7)	24.6 (76.3)	25.4 (77.7)	26.0 (78.8)	26.3 (79.3)	26.3 (79.3)	25.7 (78.3)
Mean daily minimum °C (°F)	22.2 (72.0)	22.3 (72.1)	22.2 (72.0)	21.5 (70.7)	20.7 (69.3)	19.7 (67.5)	18.9 (66.0)	19.1 (66.4)	20.1 (68.2)	21.0 (69.8)	22.0 (71.6)	22.2 (72.0)	21.0 (69.8)
Average rainfall mm (inches)	254 (10.0)	177 (7.0)	158 (6.2)	111 (4.4)	75 (3.0)	41 (1.6)	27 (1.1)	25 (1.0)	33 (1.3)	79 (3.1)	180 (7.1)	284 (11.2)	1,444 (57)
Source: Climate-Data.org

== Sister cities ==
- Kulim, Malaysia
