= Perslotim East Lombok =

Indonesian football club

Perslotim
- Full name: Persatuan Sepakbola Lombok Timur
- Nicknames: Laskar Selaparang (Selaparang Warriors)
- Ground: Selaparang Stadium; East Lombok, West Nusa Tenggara
- Capacity: 1,000
- Owner: Askab PSSI Lombok Timur
- President: Iwan Setiawan Giok
- Coach: Zainul Mutaqin
- League: Liga 4
- 2024–25: 3rd in Group C (West Nusa Tenggara zone)
Home colours	Away colours

Persatuan Sepakbola Lombok Timur (simply known as Perslotim) is an Indonesian football club based in East Lombok, West Nusa Tenggara. They currently compete in the Liga 4.

== Honours ==
- Liga 3 West Nusa Tenggara
  - Champion (1): 2018
  - Runner-up (1): 2017
- Liga 4 West Nusa Tenggara
  - Third-place (1): 2025–26
