= Persebi Bima =

Indonesian football club

- Full name: Persatuan Sepakbola Bima
- Nicknames: Garuda Emas (The Golden Garuda)
- Founded: 1964; 62 years ago
- Ground: Gelora Bou Lanta Stadium; Bima, West Nusa Tenggara
- Capacity: 2,000
- Owner: PSSI Bima Regency
- Chairman: Muhammad Putera Ferryandi
- Manager: Muchlis
- Coach: Syamsuddin
- League: Liga 4
- 2025–26: 2nd (West Nusa Tenggara zone); First round, 3rd in Group B (National phase)
Home colours	Away colours

Persatuan Sepakbola Bima (simply known as Persebi) is an Indonesian football club based in Bima Regency, West Nusa Tenggara. This club competed in Liga 4.

Their main rival is Persekobi Bima City, a club based in Bima City. The derby often called Bima derby.

== Honours ==
- Liga 3 West Nusa Tenggara
  - Champion (1): 2019
  - Third-place (1): 2023
- Liga 4 West Nusa Tenggara
  - Runner-up (1): 2025–26
