= PS Bima Sakti =

Association football team in Indonesia

- Full name: Persatuan Sepakbola Bima Sakti
- Nickname: Laskar Maju Rangga
- Founded: 1995; 31 years ago
- Ground: Gelora 17 Desember Stadium; Mataram, West Nusa Tenggara
- Capacity: 15,000
- Owner: Askot PSSI Mataram
- Manager: Abdul Muis
- Coach: Syamsudin
- League: Liga 4
- 2024–25: 3rd, Second Round of Group F (West Nusa Tenggara zone)
Home colours	Away colours

Persatuan Sepakbola Bima Sakti (simply known as PS Bima Sakti) is an Indonesian football club based in Mataram, West Nusa Tenggara. They currently competes in Liga 4.

== Honours ==
- Liga 3 West Nusa Tenggara
  - Runner-up: 2021
