= Perslobar West Lombok =

Indonesian football club

Perslobar Lombok Barat
- Full name: Persatuan Sepakbola Lombok Barat
- Nickname: Laskar Tripat
- Ground: Gelora 17 December Stadium; Mataram, West Nusa Tenggara
- Capacity: 15,000
- Owner: Askab PSSI Lombok Barat
- President: Heri Widodo
- Manager: H. Arbain Ishak
- Coach: Harianto
- League: Liga 4
- 2024–25: Lombok Island zonal play-off, (West Nusa Tenggara zone)
Home colours	Away colours

Persatuan Sepakbola Lombok Barat (simply known as Perslobar) is an Indonesian football club based in West Lombok, West Nusa Tenggara. They currently compete in the Liga 4.

== Honours ==
- Liga 3 West Nusa Tenggara
  - Champion: 2021
  - Runner-up: 2019
