= Persidom Dompu =

Indonesian football club

Persidom
- Full name: Persatuan Sepakbola Indonesia Dompu
- Nicknames: Naga Tambora (Tambora Dragons)
- Founded: 1967; 59 years ago
- Ground: GOR Manuru Kupa Stadium
- Capacity: 500
- Owner: PSSI Dompu Regency
- Ketua: Suharlin
- Coach: Syam Bima
- League: Liga 4
- 2024–25: 1st (West Nusa Tenggara zone); First round, 4th in Group E (National phase)
Home colours	Away colours

Persatuan Sepakbola Indonesia Dompu (simply known as Persidom) is an Indonesian football club based in Dompu Regency, West Nusa Tenggara. They currently compete in the Liga 4 West Nusa Tenggara zone and their homebase is GOR Manuru Kupa Stadium.

== Honours ==
- Liga 3 West Nusa Tenggara
  - Semi-finalist (1): 2021
- Liga 4 West Nusa Tenggara
  - Champion (1): 2024–25
