= Persisum Sumbawa =

Indonesian football club

- Full name: Persatuan Sepakbola Indonesia Sumbawa
- Nicknames: The Sumbawa Deer; Green Hero; Laskar Mayung Timur
- Ground: Pragas Stadium; Sumbawa, West Nusa Tenggara
- Owner: PT. Sumbawa Sportindo
- Chairman: Nanang Nasiruddin
- Manager: Tata Kostara
- Coach: Wisnu Pujanadi
- League: Liga 4
- 2023: 3nd in Group C, (West Nusa Tenggara zone)
Home colours	Away colours

Persatuan Sepakbola Indonesia Sumbawa (simply known as Persisum) is an Indonesian football club based in Sumbawa Regency, Sumbawa, West Nusa Tenggara. They currently compete in the Liga 4 and their homeground is Pragas Stadium.
