= Persekobi Bima =

Indonesian football club

Persekobi
- Full name: Persatuan Sepakbola Kota Bima
- Nicknames: Laskar Sultan Abdul Kahir (Sultan Abdul Kahir Warriors); Garuda Merah (The Red Garuda)
- Founded: 2003; 23 years ago
- Ground: Manggemaci Stadium; Bima, West Nusa Tenggara
- Capacity: 10,000
- Owner: PSSI Bima City
- Chairman: Aris Munandar
- Coach: Lukman Eghy
- League: Liga 4
- 2024–25: 3rd, Group E (West Nusa Tenggara zone)
Home colours	Away colours

Persatuan Sepakbola Kota Bima (simply known as Persekobi) is an Indonesian football club based in Bima, West Nusa Tenggara. They currently compete in the Liga 4.

Their main rival is Persebi Bima, a club based in Bima Regency. The derby often called Bima derby.
