= PS Mataram =

Indonesian football club

- Full name: Persatuan Sepakbola Mataram
- Nickname: Laskar Bhumi Gora
- Founded: 1997; 29 years ago
- Ground: Gelora 17 December Stadium, Mataram, West Nusa Tenggara
- Capacity: 15,000
- Owner: PSSI Mataram City
- Coach: Harjanto
- League: Liga 4
- 2024–25: 3rd, (West Nusa Tenggara zone)
Home colours	Away colours

Persatuan Sepakbola Mataram is an Indonesian football club based in Mataram, Lombok, West Nusa Tenggara. They currently compete in the Liga 4.

== Honours ==
- Liga 3 West Nusa Tenggara
  - Champion (1): 2023
