= West Sumbawa Regency =

Regency in West Nusa Tenggara, Indonesia

West Sumbawa Regency Kabupaten Sumbawa Barat
- Regency
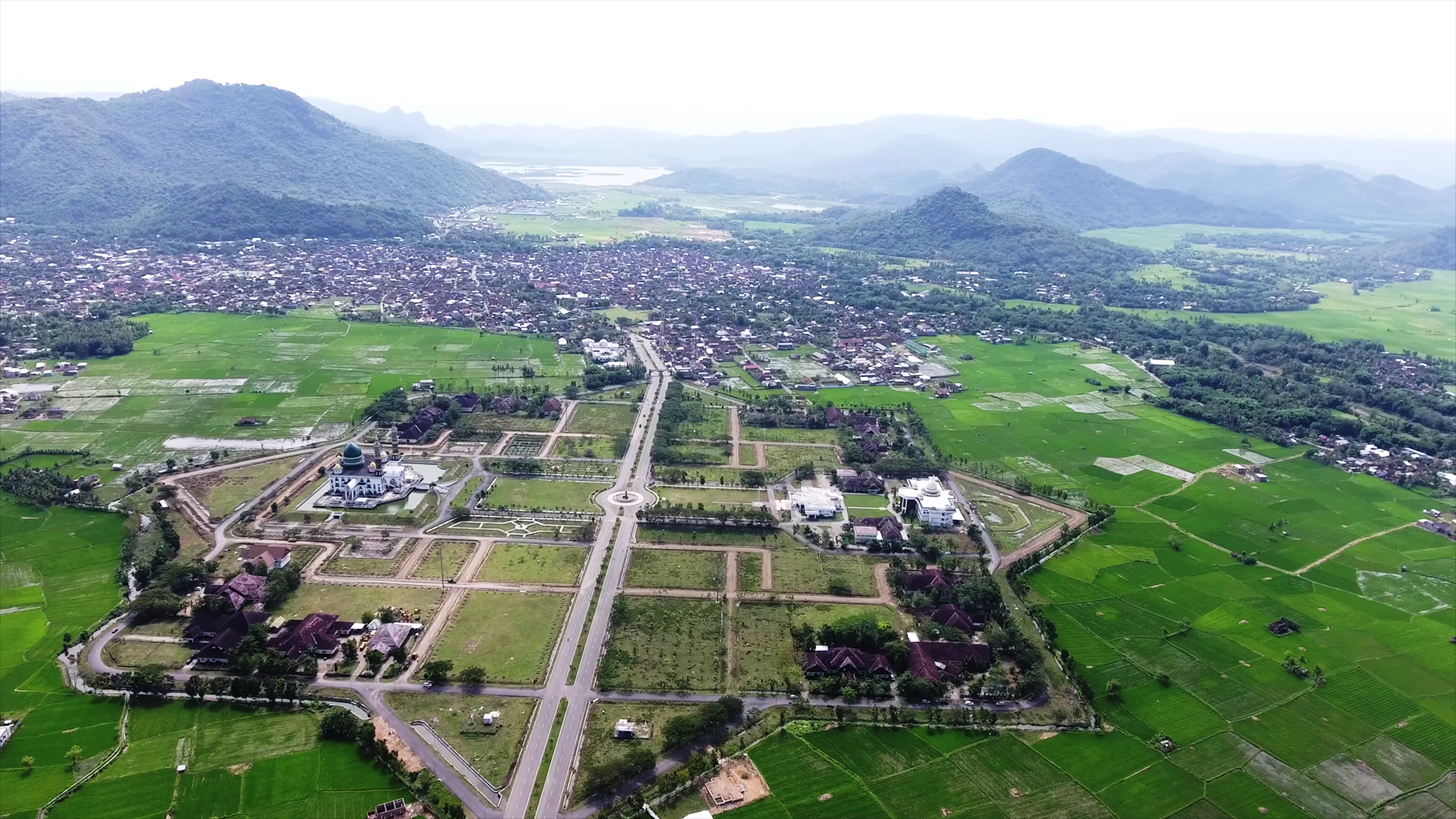
- Governmental complex of West Sumbawa called Kemutar Telu Center

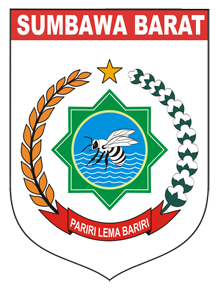
- Coat of arms
- Motto: Pariri Lema Bariri (Developing Worthwhileness)
- Location within West Nusa Tenggara

- Location in Lesser Sunda Islands and Indonesia West Sumbawa Regency (Indonesia)
- Coordinates: 8°47′14.52″S 116°55′33.2″E
- Country: Indonesia
- Province: West Nusa Tenggara
- Capital: Taliwang

Government
  - Regent: Amar Nurmansyah
  - Vice Regent: Hanipah

Area
  - Total: 1,743.58 km^{2} (673.20 sq mi)

Population (mid 2025 estimate)
  - Total: 158,130
  - Density: 90.693/km^{2} (234.89/sq mi)
- Time zone: UTC+8 (ICST)
- Area code: (+62) 372
- Website: sumbawabaratkab.go.id

West Sumbawa Regency (Indonesian: Kabupaten Sumbawa Barat) is a Regency (Kabupaten) of the Indonesian Province of West Nusa Tenggara. It is located on the island of Sumbawa and has an area of 1,743.58 km^{2}. The regency was created on 18 December 2003 from what were at that time the westernmost five districts (kecamatan) of Sumbawa Regency. The population at the 2010 Census was 114,754, and at the 2020 Census was 145,798; the official estimate as at mid 2025 was 158,130 comprising 79,440 males and 78,690 females. The capital is the town of Taliwang.

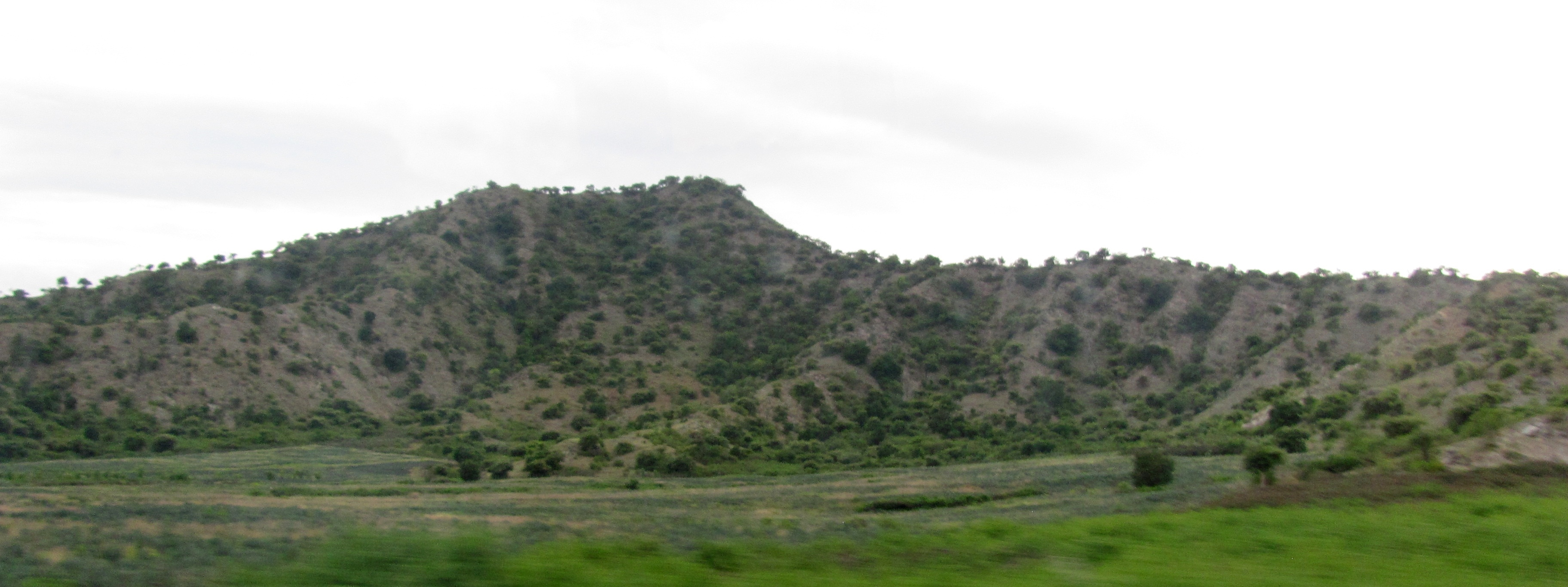
Typical landscape in West Sumbawa Regency

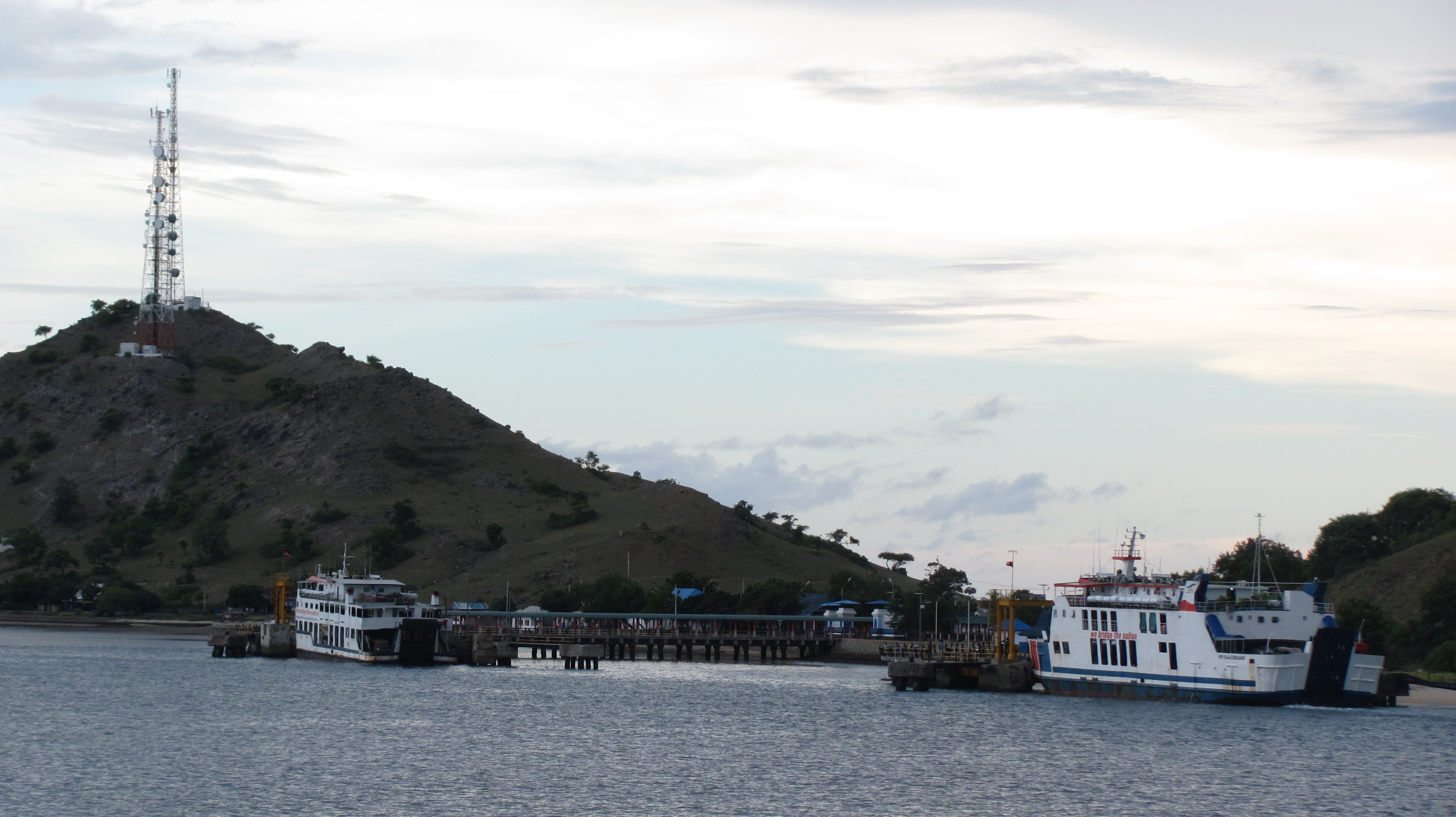
Harbour of Poto Tano

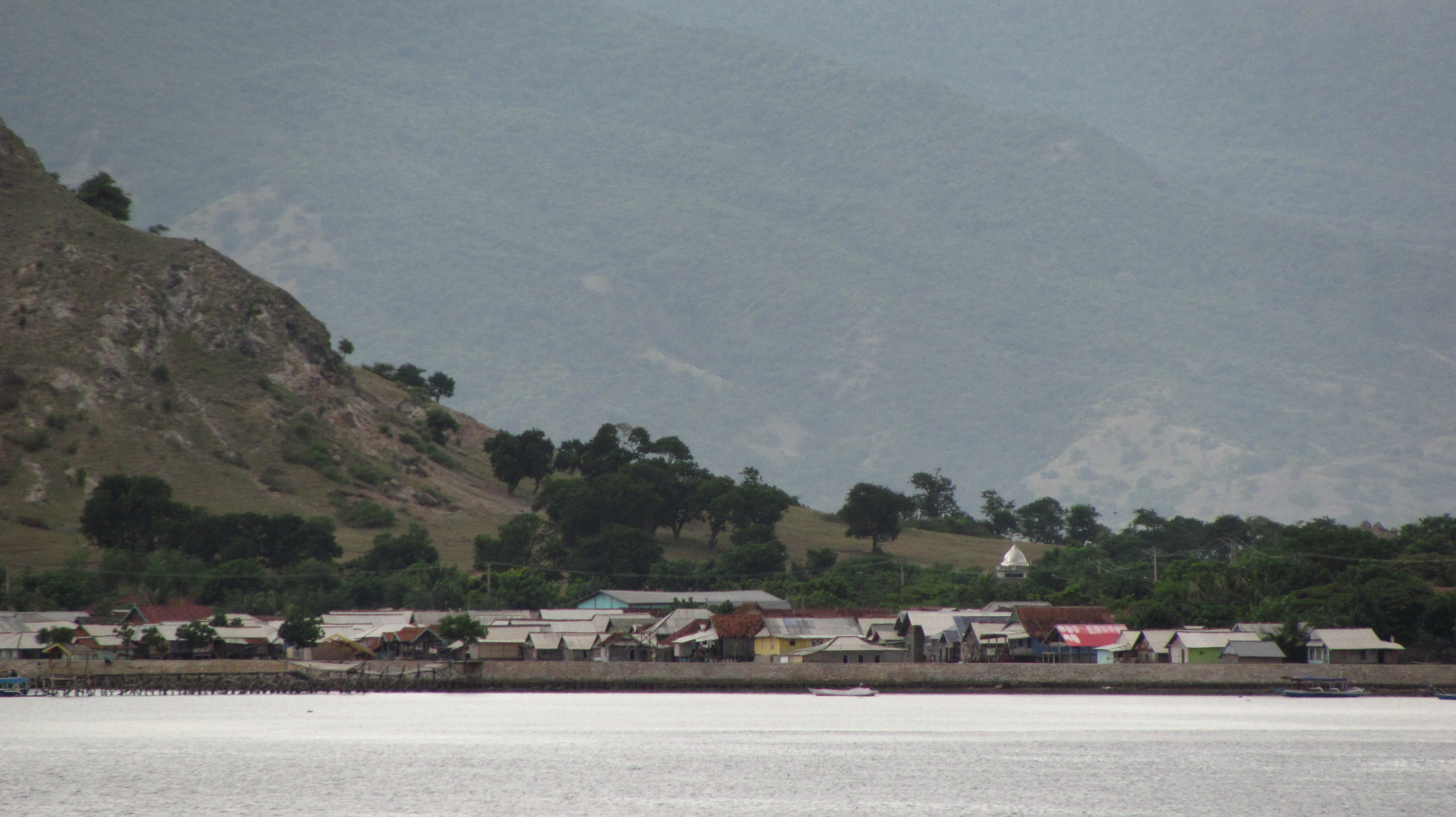
Poto Tano, a village on the west coast

Poto Tano, the most important harbour of West Sumbawa, is easily accessible by ferry from Lombok.

== Administrative districts ==
West Sumbawa Regency originally comprised five districts (kecamatan) formerly part of Sumbawa Regency, but now consists of eight districts, tabulated below with their areas and their populations at the 2010 Census and the 2020 Census, together with the official estimates as at mid 2025. The table also includes the locations of the district administrative centres, the number of administrative villages in each district (totaling 57 rural desa and 7 urban kelurahan - the latter all in Taliwang District), and its postal codes.

Kode Wilayah	Name of District (kecamatan)	Area in km^{2}	Pop'n 2010 Census	Pop'n 2020 Census	Pop'n mid 2025 Estimate	Admin centre	No. of villages	Post code(s)
52.07.04	Sekongkang ^{(a)}	273.65	8,179	14,483	18,280	Sekongkang Bawah	7	84457
52.07.01	Jereweh	527.63	8,370	9,764	10,070	Beru	4	84456
52.07.08	Maluk	38.83	11,929	11,649	11,650	Benete	5	84459
52.07.02	Taliwang ^{(b)}	153.71	44,136	57,610	59,090	Kuang	15 ^{(c)}	84452
52.07.07	Brang Ene	252.62	5,088	6,589	7,150	Manemeng	6	84455
52.07.05	Brang Rea	258.23	12,498	16,044	17,330	Tepas	9 ^{(d)}	84455 & 84458
52.07.03	Seteluk	107.37	15,424	19,413	20,770	Seteluk Tengah	10	84457
52.07.06	Poto Tano ^{(e)}	130.23	9,327	12,513	13,810	Senayan	8	84454
	Totals	1,743.58	114,754	145,798	158,130	Taliwang	64	

Notes: (a) including the small islands of Pulau Baban and Pulau Rantung off the southwest coast of Sumbawa.
(b) including the small islands of Pulau Dua Ode, Pulau Dua Rea, Pulau Gera, Pulau Puyen, Pulau Sarang and Pulau Sesai off the west coast of Sumbawa.
(c) comprises 7 urban kelurahan (Arab Kenangan, Bugis, Dalam, Kuang, Menala, Sampir and Telaga Bertong) and 8 desa.
(d) Desa Beru, Tepas, Bangkat Monte and Sapugara Bree share the postcode 84458; Tepas Sepakat, Lamuntet, Rarak Ronges, Moteng and Seminar Salit share the postcode 84455.
(e) including the islands of Pulau Belang, Pulau Kambing, Pulau Kenawa, Pulau Mandik1, Pulau Namo, Pulau Paserang and Pulau Ular situated in the Alas Strait off the northwest coast of Sumbawa.
