= Narmada, West Lombok =

District of West Nusa Tenggara, Indonesia

Narmada
- Kecamatan
- Location within Lesser Sunda Islands Location within Indonesia
- Coordinates: 08°31′04″S 116°14′48″E
- Country: Indonesia
- Provinces: West Nusa Tenggara
- Regency: West Lombok
- Villages: 21

Government
  - Camat: Muhammad Busyairi

Area
  - Total: 128.78 km^{2} (49.72 sq mi)
- Elevation: 127 m (417 ft)

Population (mid 2025 estimate)
  - Total: 110,426
  - Density: 857.48/km^{2} (2,220.9/sq mi)
- Time zone: UTC+7 (WIB)
- Postal code: 83371
- Ministry of Home Affairs Code: 52.01.03

Narmada is a town and administrative district (kecamatan) in West Lombok Regency, West Nusa Tenggara, Indonesia. It is located on the west side of the island of Lombok, approximately 10 kilometres east of Mataram, the provincial capital. In mid 2025, its population was 110,426.

== Geography ==
Narmada is located to the southwest of Mount Rinjani. It borders Gangga and Kayangan to the north, Batukliang Utara to the east, Pringgarata and Kediri to the east, as well as Labu Api and Sandubaya to the west. Its average elevation is 127 metres above the sea level. Suranadi Nature Recreation Park is a nature reserve in Narmada.

== Climate ==
Narmada has a tropical monsoon climate (Am) under the Köppen climate classification. It sees the most rainfall in December, with an average of 419 millimetres or 16.50 inches; and the least in August, with an average of 12 millimetres or 0.47 inches.

Climate data for Narmada
Month	Jan	Feb	Mar	Apr	May	Jun	Jul	Aug	Sep	Oct	Nov	Dec	Year
Mean daily maximum °C (°F)	28.3 (82.9)	28.5 (83.3)	28.9 (84.0)	29.5 (85.1)	29.9 (85.8)	29.7 (85.5)	29.7 (85.5)	30.5 (86.9)	31.3 (88.3)	31.5 (88.7)	30.3 (86.5)	28.8 (83.8)	29.7 (85.5)
Daily mean °C (°F)	25.6 (78.1)	25.7 (78.3)	25.9 (78.6)	26.3 (79.3)	26.2 (79.2)	25.6 (78.1)	25.2 (77.4)	25.3 (77.5)	26.1 (79.0)	26.8 (80.2)	26.7 (80.1)	25.9 (78.6)	25.9 (78.7)
Mean daily minimum °C (°F)	23.8 (74.8)	23.9 (75.0)	24 (75)	23.9 (75.0)	23.4 (74.1)	22.5 (72.5)	21.7 (71.1)	21.4 (70.5)	22.2 (72.0)	23.3 (73.9)	24.2 (75.6)	24.1 (75.4)	23.2 (73.7)
Average rainfall mm (inches)	410 (16.1)	354 (13.9)	369 (14.5)	268 (10.6)	90 (3.5)	53 (2.1)	33 (1.3)	12 (0.5)	30 (1.2)	87 (3.4)	268 (10.6)	419 (16.5)	2,393 (94.2)
Source: Climate-Data.org

== Education ==
There are a total of 96 educational facilities in Narmada. They can be classified in the following way:

Type	Number	
Type	Public	Private
Primary schools (SD)	49	2
Junior High Schools (SMP)	7	7
Madrasah Ibtidaiyah (MI)	N/A	15
Madrasah Tsanawiyah (MTs)	N/A	16

A High School in Narmada is Smansa or SMA Negeri 1 Narmada.
