= SMA Negeri 1 Narmada =

Location
- Jl. Suranadi 51, Kota Narmada, West Nusa Tenggara, Lombok Barat; Kota Narmada, Indonesia, West Nusa Tenggara
- Coordinates: 8.5864°S 116.2010°E

Information
- Type: State
- Status: National Standard Charter Schools
- Enrollment: 960
- Website: http://sman1narmada.sch.id/

SMA Negeri 1 Narmada, also known as Smansa, is a high school on the Indonesian island of Lombok just east of Mataram. It was established in 1983,
