= Gerung =

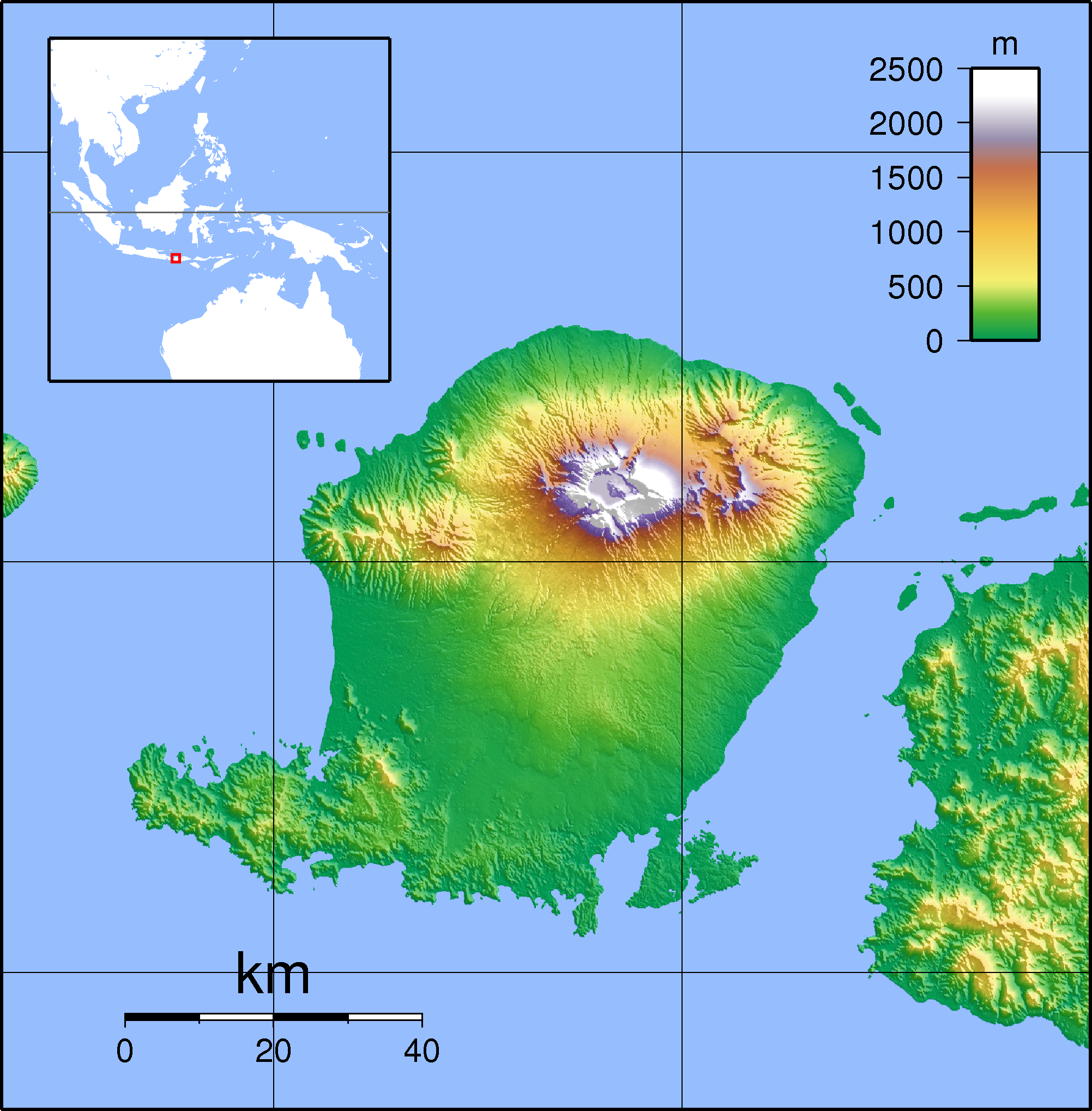
- Location in Indonesia Gerung (Indonesia)
- Coordinates: 8°43′S 116°7′E
- Country: Indonesia
- Region: Lesser Sunda Islands
- Province: West Nusa Tenggara
- Regency: West Lombok

Area
  - Total: 60.31 km^{2} (23.29 sq mi)

Population (mid 2025 estimate)
  - Total: 96,406
  - Density: 1,599/km^{2} (4,140/sq mi)
- Time zone: UTC+08

Gerung is a town and administrative district (kecamatan) on the island of Lombok and is also the capital of the West Lombok Regency in the Indonesian province of West Nusa Tenggara.

== Climate ==
Gerung has a tropical monsoon climate (Köppen Am) with moderate to little rainfall from May to October and heavy rainfall from November to April.

Climate data for Gerung
Month	Jan	Feb	Mar	Apr	May	Jun	Jul	Aug	Sep	Oct	Nov	Dec	Year
Mean daily maximum °C (°F)	30.5 (86.9)	30.6 (87.1)	30.8 (87.4)	31.3 (88.3)	31.0 (87.8)	30.3 (86.5)	29.7 (85.5)	30.1 (86.2)	30.8 (87.4)	31.2 (88.2)	31.2 (88.2)	31.0 (87.8)	30.7 (87.3)
Daily mean °C (°F)	26.6 (79.9)	26.7 (80.1)	26.6 (79.9)	26.5 (79.7)	26.0 (78.8)	25.1 (77.2)	24.6 (76.3)	24.9 (76.8)	25.8 (78.4)	26.5 (79.7)	26.9 (80.4)	26.9 (80.4)	26.1 (79.0)
Mean daily minimum °C (°F)	22.8 (73.0)	22.9 (73.2)	22.5 (72.5)	21.7 (71.1)	21.1 (70.0)	20.0 (68.0)	19.5 (67.1)	19.8 (67.6)	20.9 (69.6)	21.8 (71.2)	22.6 (72.7)	22.8 (73.0)	21.5 (70.8)
Average rainfall mm (inches)	277 (10.9)	243 (9.6)	162 (6.4)	131 (5.2)	98 (3.9)	80 (3.1)	83 (3.3)	43 (1.7)	37 (1.5)	103 (4.1)	179 (7.0)	297 (11.7)	1,733 (68.4)
Source: Climate-Data.org
