= Sekotong =

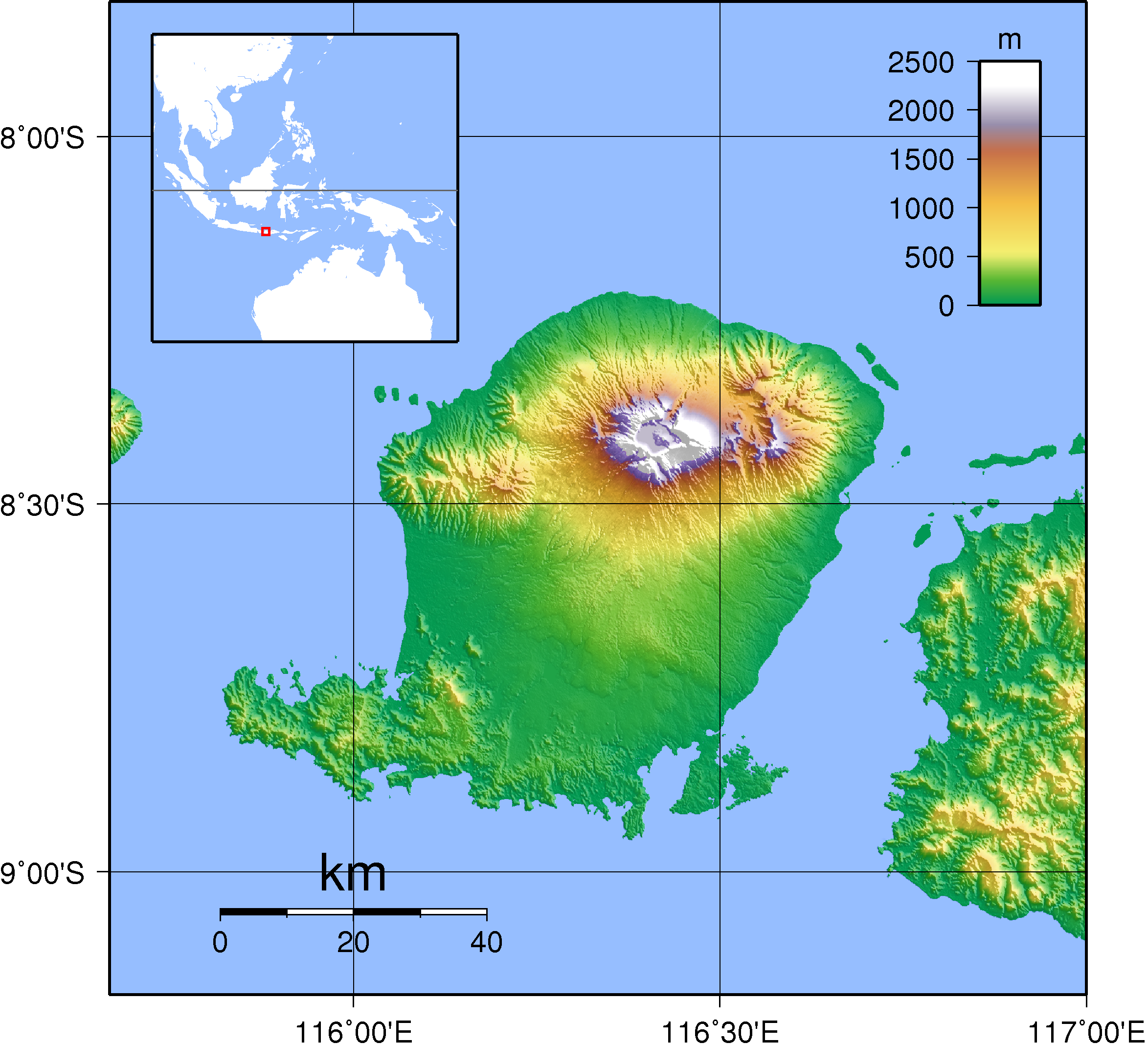
Sekotong Peninsula, the long peninsula jutting from the south-west of the island of Lombok.

Sekotong is an administrative district (kecamatan) in the southwest of West Lombok Regency in West Nusa Tenggara Province of Indonesia. It covers a land area of 340.78 km^{2}, and had a population of 71,202 as at mid 2025. It includes the Sekotong Peninsula (Indonesian: Semenanjung Sekotong), a peninsula in the south-west of Lombok Island, Indonesia.
