= Suranadi Nature Recreation Park =

- Area: 0.52 km^{2} (0.20 sq mi)

The Suranadi Nature Recreation Park is a nature park on the island of Lombok, West Nusa Tenggara in Indonesia. It was established in 1976. This site is 0.52 km^{2} and is known for hiking.
