= West Lombok Regency =

Regency in West Nusa Tenggara, Indonesia

West Lombok Regency Kabupaten Lombok Barat
- Regency
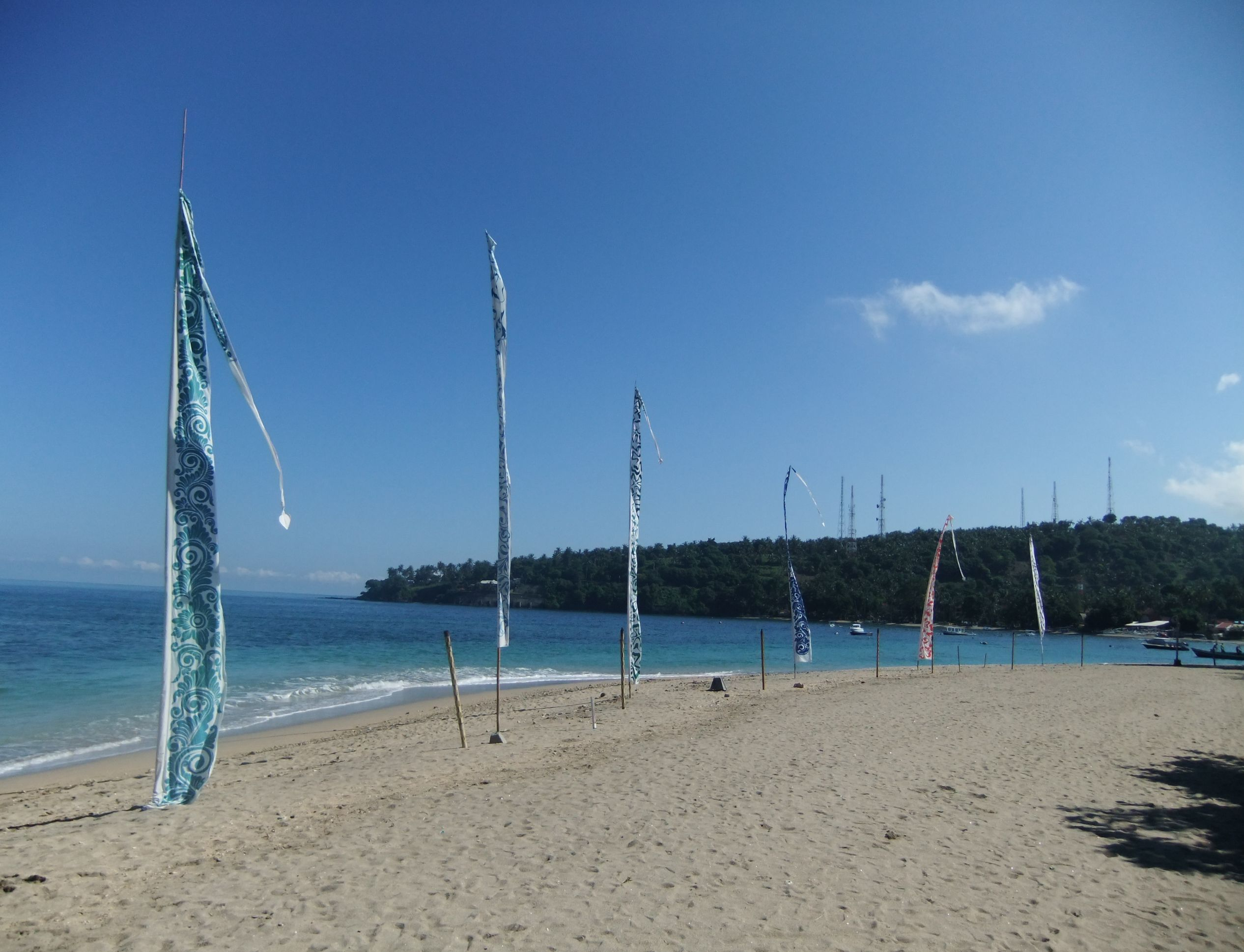
- Beach at Senggigi in West Lombok

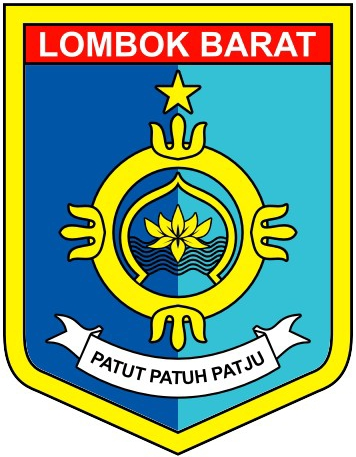
- Coat of arms
- Motto: Patut, Patuh, Patju (Fit, Obedient, Keen)
- Location within West Nusa Tenggara

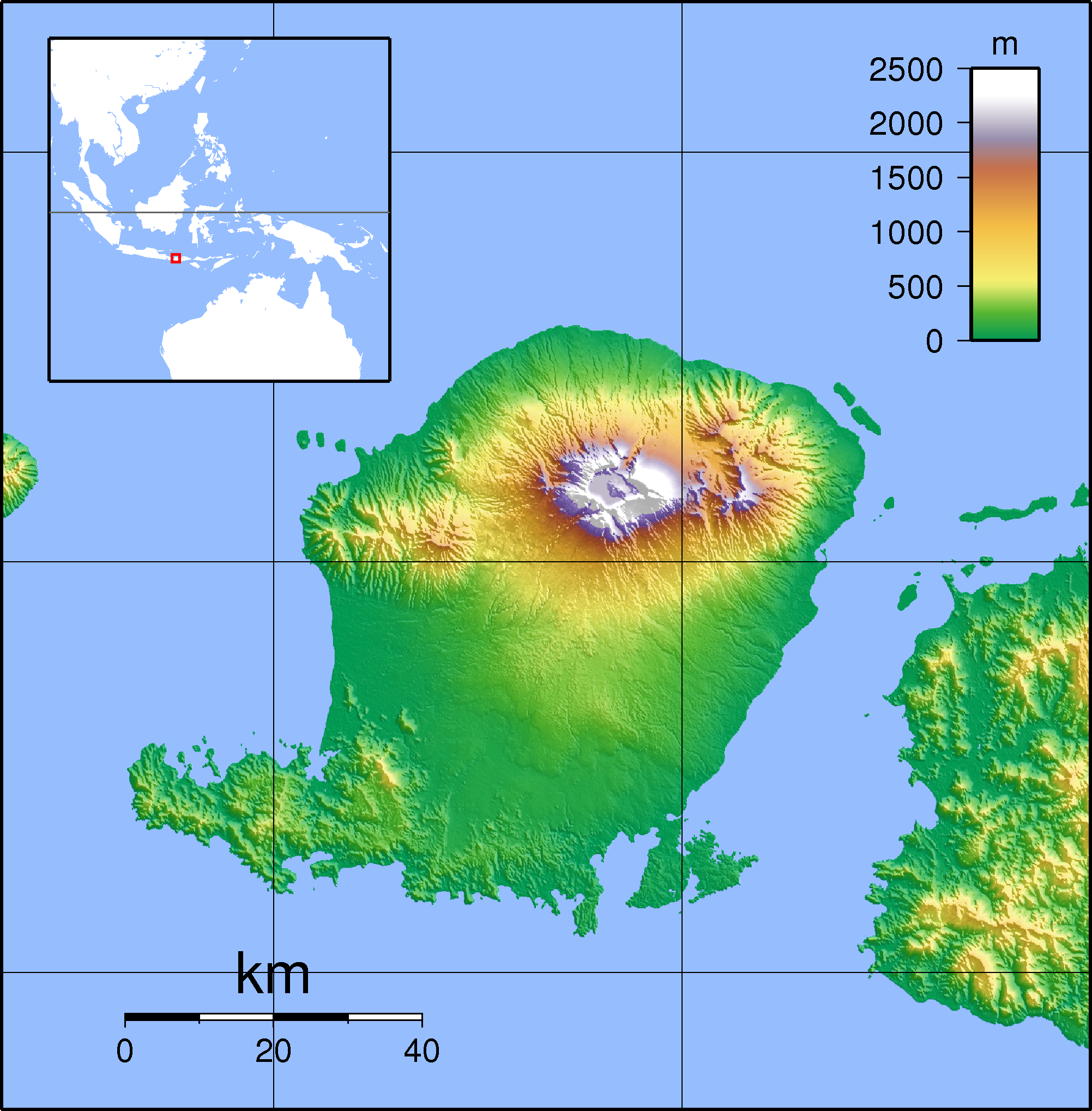
- Location in Lombok, Lesser Sunda Islands and Indonesia West Lombok Regency (Lesser Sunda Islands) West Lombok Regency (Indonesia)
- Coordinates: 8°43′S 116°7′E
- Country: Indonesia
- Province: West Nusa Tenggara
- Capital: Gerung

Government
  - Regent: Lalu Ahmad Zaini
  - Vice Regent: Nurul Adha

Area
  - Total: 919.44 km^{2} (355.00 sq mi)

Population (mid 2025 estimate)
  - Total: 776,300
  - Density: 844.3/km^{2} (2,187/sq mi)

Demographics
  - Ethnic groups: Sasak, Balinese, Javanese, Sumbawa people, Flores people
  - Religion: Muslim, Hindu, Christian, Buddhist
  - Languages: Indonesian (official), Sasak, Balinese (Lombok Balinese)
- Time zone: UTC+8 (ICST)
- Area code: (+62) 370
- Website: lombokbaratkab.go.id

West Lombok Regency (Indonesian: Kabupaten Lombok Barat; pronounced [kabuˌpat̪ɛn ˌlɔmbɔʔ ˈbarat̪̚]) is a regency of the Indonesian Province of West Nusa Tenggara. It is located on the island of Lombok and the administrative capital is the town of Gerung. The regency covers a land area of 919.44 km^{2} and had a population of 599,609 at the 2010 census and 721,481 at the 2020 census; the official estimate as at mid 2025 was 776,300 (comprising 390,222 males and 386,078 females).

== Location ==
West Lombok Regency is bounded by North Lombok Regency to the north, Central Lombok Regency to the east and the Lombok Strait to the west. To the northeast of the regency is Mount Rinjani which at 3,726 m is the third highest mountain the second-largest volcano in the country and is and an active volcano. The oldest recorded historical eruption was in 1847 and last eruption was in May 2010.

== History ==
The regency of West Lombok was established on 9 August 1958 and originally included the northern section of Lombok subsequently separated as the regency of North Lombok. The West Lombok Administrative Region previously oversaw the West coast, Ampenan, Tanjung, Bayan, Gerung, Gondang and Cakranegara.

In 1993 the West Lombok District was separated into two separate entities. As a consequence of the separation of the city of Mataram from the West Lombok Regency on 26 July 1993, the capital of West Lombok Regency was moved from Mataram to Gerung in the south of the regency. This move resulted in the five districts in the northwestern end of the island being judged to be too far away from the services of the West Lombok Regency HQ at Gerung. Subsequently, on 21 July 2008 (and with the full support of the local government of West Lombok Regency) North Lombok established its own regency government situated at Tanjung. The northwest of the island now functions autonomously from the West Lombok Regency.

== Administration ==
=== Administrative structure ===
Kabupaten Lombok Barat (West Lombok Regency) is one of Lombok's four Regencies or administrative regions.

- TGH M Zainul Majdi, MA., governor of the province of West Nusa Tenggara (Provinsi Nusa Tenggara Barat), (the city of Mataram is the provincial capital of West Nusa Tenggara).
- H. Fauzan Khalid S.Ag., M.Si. regent (bupati) of West Lombok Regency (Kabupaten Lombok Barat).

=== Administrative boundaries ===
Boundary	District	Regency
North	Pemenang, Mount Rinjani	North Lombok Regency
South	Lombok Basin	Indian Ocean
West		Lombok Strait
East	Praya Barat	Central Lombok Regency

Subsequent to the inauguration of the newly elected bupati, tensions rose in Lembah Sari village in late September 2010. A border dispute over the new regency boundaries had been in disputation since July 2010 when the previously ratified border alignment became clear to villagers. Apparently the new border dividing the North Lombok Regency from West Lombok Regency traversed the village of Lembah Sari situated west of Pemenang. Residents felled a large tree on the side of the main inland road connecting the North Lombok Regency to that of West Lombok Regency and the City of Mataram so that it blocked the road. Residents claimed that they established the roadblock to protest a unilateral decision by officials in North Lombok to move the border between the two districts. A police detachment re-opened the road after seven hours of blockade by villagers from the 14 hamlets that form Lembah Sari. The police intervention allowed workers from West Lombok Regency to commence work to clear the road and limited through traffic was restored. The North Lombok Regency made public statements to clarify that district authorities would abide by whatever decision was made by the provincial government regarding regency boundaries. Thirty-four villages formerly part of West Lombok are now part of North Lombok.

== Administrative districts ==
West Lombok Regency consists of ten districts (kecamatan), tabulated below with their areas and their populations at the 2010 census and the 2020 census, together with the official estimates as at mid 2025. The table also includes the locations of the district administrative centres, the number of administrative villages in each district (comprising 119 rural desa and 3 urban kelurahan - the latter all in Gerung District), and its postal codes.

Kode Wilayah	Name of District (kecamatan)	Area in km^{2}	Pop'n census 2010	Pop'n census 2020	Pop'n estimate mid 2025	Admin centre	No. of villages	Post codes
52.01.07	Sekotong ^{(a)}	340.78	56,230	66,174	71,202	Sekotong	9	83365
52.01.13	Lembar	77.20	44,426	54,414	58,548	Lembar	10	83364
52.01.01	Gerung	60.31	74,327	89,598	96,406	Gerung	14	83363
52.01.08	Labu Api	23.88	60,756	78,960	84,959	Labuapi	12	83361
52.01.02	Kediri	21.14	54,204	63,489	68,313	Kediri	10	83362
52.01.15	Kuripan	25.03	34,020	41,808	44,985	Kuripan	6	83360
52.01.03	Narmada	128.78	87,897	102,628	110,426	Narmada	21	83370
52.01.12	Lingsar	115.47	63,409	75,797	81,556	Lingsar	15	83371
52.01.09	Gunung Sari	84.17	78,633	94,994	102,213	Gunungsari	16	83351
52.01.14	Batu Layar	42.68	45,388	53,618	57,692	Batu Layar	9	83355
	Totals	919.44	599,609 ^{(b)}	721,481	776,300	Gerung	122	

Notes: (a) covers the Sekotong Peninsula, including 35 islands off the southwest corner of Lombok Island. (b) the 2010 total includes 696 inhabitants in Lainnya (outside administrative districts).

The ten districts are subdivided into 119 rural Desa and 3 urban Kelurahan ("villages"); the latter (Dasan Geres, Gerung Selatan and Gerung Utara) are all in Gerung District.

=== Land use ===
37,484 hectares (92,620 acres), or 45.16% of the total area of West Lombok Regency, are protected forest. Residential land use is 4,572 hectares (11,300 acres), or 5.30% of total area.

Productive irrigated and unirrigated, rain-fed agricultural land is 13,209 hectares (32,640 acres), or 15.31% of the regency's area. Park and open grazing area is 12,957 hectares (32,020 acres), or 15.02%, with plantation and orchard areas covering 8,804 hectares (21,760 acres) or 10.21% of the area. Remaining land is used for livestock and fisheries. Exploration for gold, silver and copper is becoming increasingly important in the southwest part of the regency, especially in Sekotong subdistrict. It is providing good incomes as well as occupational training to local inhabitants who work for the mining companies.

== Population ==
=== Decennial census results ===
The 2020 census resulted in a total of 721,481 inhabitants, up from 599,609 at the 2010 census.

== Ethnicity ==
The Sasak people are the indigenous people of Lombok and form the majority of West Lombok's residents. West Lombok is also home to people of Balinese, Chinese, Tionghoa-peranakan people of mixed Indonesian and Chinese descent and small number of Arab Indonesian people, mainly of Yemeni descent who settled in the early port city of Ampenan.

== Religion ==
Islam is the religion of the majority population of West Lombok. Other religion practised in West Lombok are Hinduism, Catholicism, Christianity, Buddhism, and Confucianism.

== Language ==
Most people in West Lombok normally speak the Sasak language as it is the native language of the indigenous people of Lombok. The Indonesian language is the language most widely used in everyday interactions at places such as hotels, larger shops in the township of Senggigi and in the government offices. When at home or a place of recreation West Lombok residents tend to use local western Lombok dialects of the Sasak language.

== Services and development ==
Most of the region's services are provided from Mataram. Regional government (regency) services are centred at Gerung. The region is agrarian in activity with rice, copra, casava, timber and other crops. Rainfall is lower in the south of the regency and higher in the north as the land rises toward Mount Rinjani. Rinjani supplies a rainfall catchment area to the region and several eastern Lombok rivers flow from its slopes. The sea supports a small local fishing industry, a pearl industry and prawn farming. Mineral exploration for gold, silver and copper forms an increasingly important activity.

The growing tourism industry in Lombok has affected the western region's historical dependence on fishing and land-based agrarian pursuits. It is anticipated that the opening of the new Lombok International Airport will possibly lead to an increase in tourism-related business and development in West Lombok in coming years.

In 2000, the capital of West Lombok District was moved from Mataram to Gerung in the south of the district. This has seen this town developed as a centre of administration and many new regional government offices have been constructed there. This location in the south of the regency was in part responsible for the later division of West Lombok into two regencies: West Lombok Regency and North Lombok Regency. During 2009–2010 infrastructure upgrades were commenced to provide better communications along the western coast, including roadworks and fibre-optic cable installation.

Mataram is officially the provincial capital of West Nusa Tenggara and the administrative offices of TGH M Zainul Majdi, MA., governor of NTB (West Nusa Tenggara).

== Transportation ==
Public ferries connect from Bali to Tanjung Lembar in the south west of the island Lembar and provide services for both passengers and vehicles. Tanjung Lembar is Lombok's main port and handles small freighters, fishing boats and the combination vehicle and passenger ferries that cross the Lombok straight to Padangbai in Bali.

- Lombok Strait: Lembar Lombok – Padang Bai, Bali, with 12 ferries providing crossings once every hour.
- Alat Strait: Labuhan Lombok – Pototano, Sumbawa with 8 ferries providing 18 crossings per day.

Labuhan Lombok seaport on the east coast of the island provides facilities for vehicle and passenger ferries eastward to Sumbawa.

These drive on, drive off ferries provide the principal facilities for road transport movements in and out of Lombok. Disruptions on these routes can significantly affect trade and the provision of supplies to the island as the shipping operators on these routes will often suspend services due to breakdown or heavy seas.

Private charter boats provide access between Senggigi, the Gili Islands and Teluk Nare. Some of the scheduled services connect Senggigi across the Lombok strait westward to Bali via the Gili islands.

Fast speedboat services are also available connecting to Teluk Nare a little south of Bangsal and to Gili islands.

Public buses and Bemo run along the west coast from the south in Mataram/Cakranegara/Sweta and also through Pusuk mountain pass to connect Tanjung and North Lombok to Mataram and Cakranegara. Limited services are available to the east coast connecting through Cakranegara, Sweta, Praya and south toward Kuta and Tanjung Lembar in the south west of the island.

West Lombok is served by the Lombok International Airport (Bandara Internasional Lombok) (IATA: LOP, ICAO: WADL). The new airport provides domestic terminal facilities serving destinations in Java, Bali and Sumbawa. The main terminal building also provides international terminal facilities. International flights to Kuala Lumpur provided by Garuda and Merpati airlines depart from the domestic terminal section of the building.

The new international airport will be suitable for wide bodied aircraft operations will provide more modern terminal facilities, and improved cargo handling capacity.

Lombok International Airport is south west of Praya in south Central Lombok. The airport commenced operations on 1 October 2011 replacing the previous international and domestic facilities at Selaparang Airport near Ampenan in West Lombok Regency which formally closed for operations on the evening of 30 September 2011. All services previously operated at the Selaparang airport were moved across to the new airport at that time.

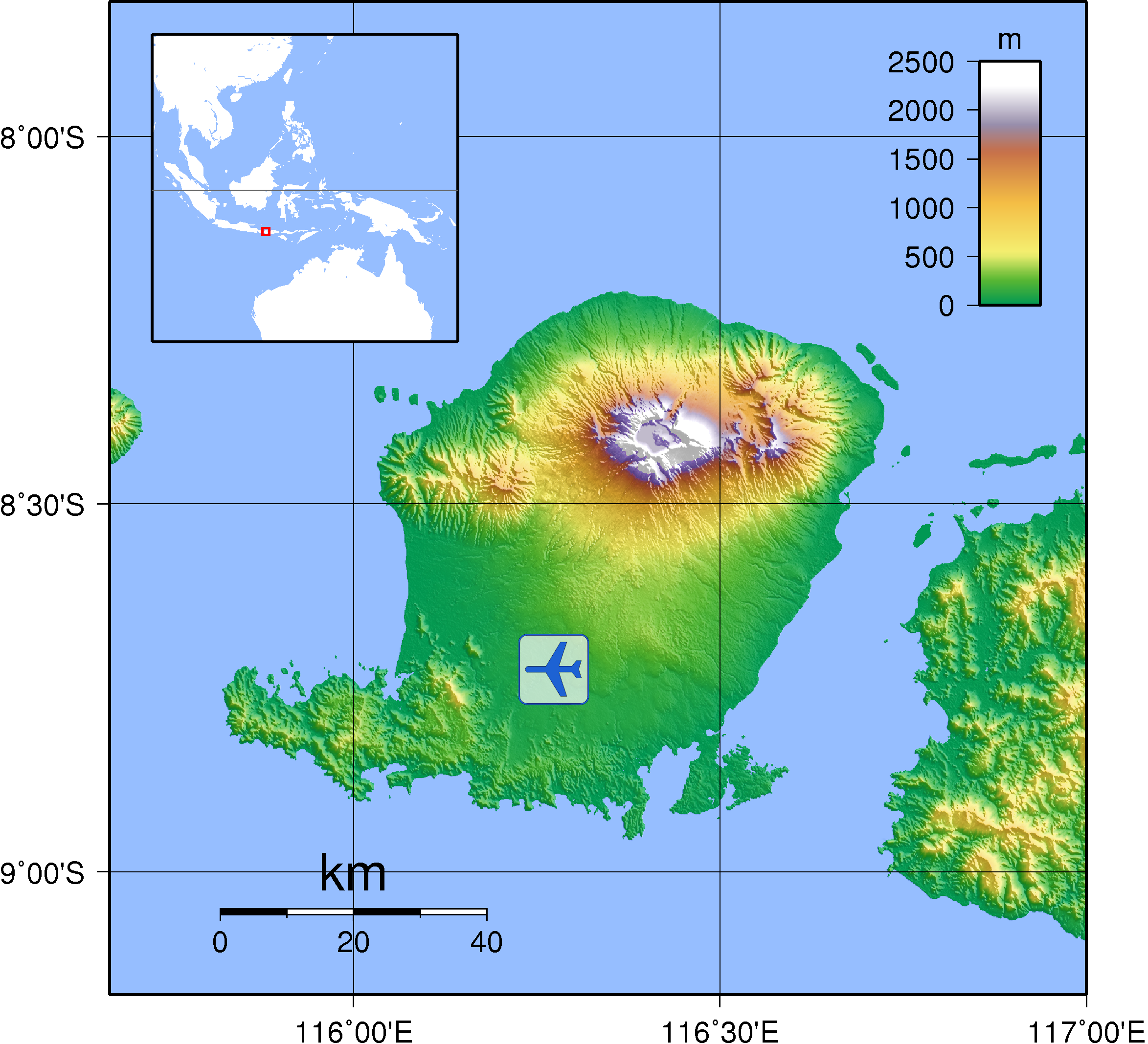

Pelni shipping lines provide inter-island sea connections for passenger travel throughout the archipelago of Indonesia, Pelni Shipping Lines have offices in Ampenan in west Lombok.

== Tourism ==
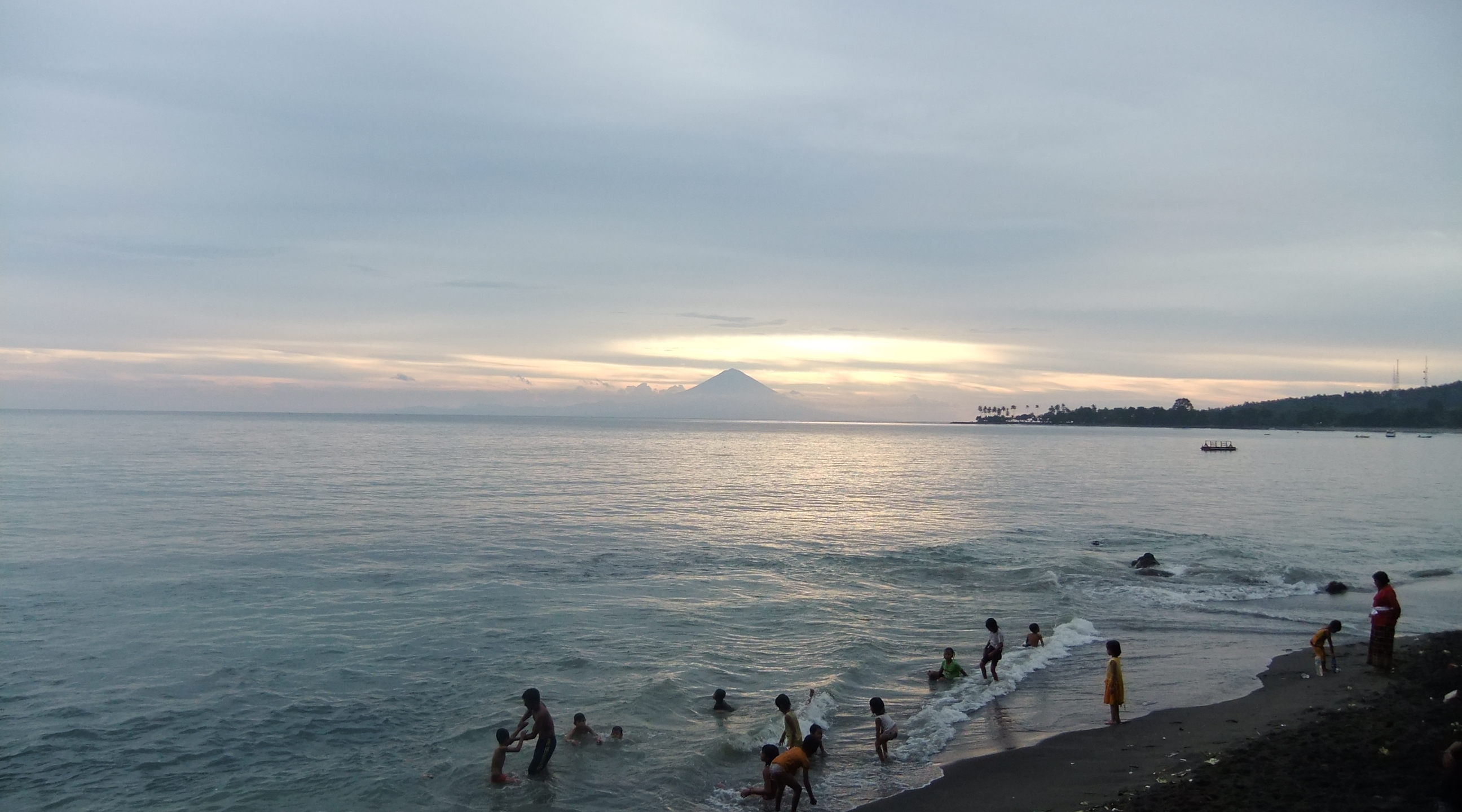
Batu Bolong, looking toward Senggigi in West Lombok

The western coast of Lombok has the most intensive tourism activity. Senggigi and the coastal strip to the south of the township toward Montong and north to the West Lombok Regency's border at Klui have many hotels, restaurants, bars clubs and other entertainment and accommodation facilities. Mount Rinjani and the Gili Islands are further up the west coast in North Lombok Regency.

The newly upgraded west coast highway and the road from Mataram through the Pusuk pass connect the West Lombok Regency to the North Lombok Regency and are important tourism conduits unifying the islands tourism sector. The inland oriented Pusak pass road passes through attractive mountain and river gorges and has a population of monkeys that live in the nearby Monkey Forest park and Forest reserve. Bangsal and Tanjunk Teluk near Pemenang provide services connecting across the short distance of water to the Gili islands off the Sire Peninsular just south of Tanjung. The coastal highway has become a popular scenic route since the commencement of a comprehensive upgrade programme in 2008–2010. A little further to the north in the North Lombok Regency are the small townships of Bayan and Senaru which offer the main gateways to access Mount Rinjani, and Bangsal which provides a public ferry service to the nearby Gilli islands. Charter boats and ferries are active from Senggigi and Mangsit taking tourists to and from the west Lombok and north Lombok regions. Shuttle bus, hire cars, taxis and bemo services also provide links to the north.

Hotels in West Lombok Regency

Rating	Hotels	Rooms	Beds
Star rated	22	1,221	1,824
Budget	40	444	628
Total	62	1,665	2,425

== Gili Mas New Port ==
Due to existing Lembar Port has only 10 Low Water Spring (LWS) and passengers from cruise ships should be disembarked and transferred by boat to the beach, so Port Authority decided to build Gili Mas New Port (near Lembar Port) with 16–18 LWS depth on totally 100 hectares land. The port also has container facilities and for the first stage projects will be operated at the end of 2018.
