= Lombok =

Island in West Nusa Tenggara, Indonesia

Native name: ᬕᬸᬫᬶᬲᬲᬓ᭄ (Gumi Sasaq) Nickname: Pulau Seribu Masjid "Island of a Thousand Mosques"
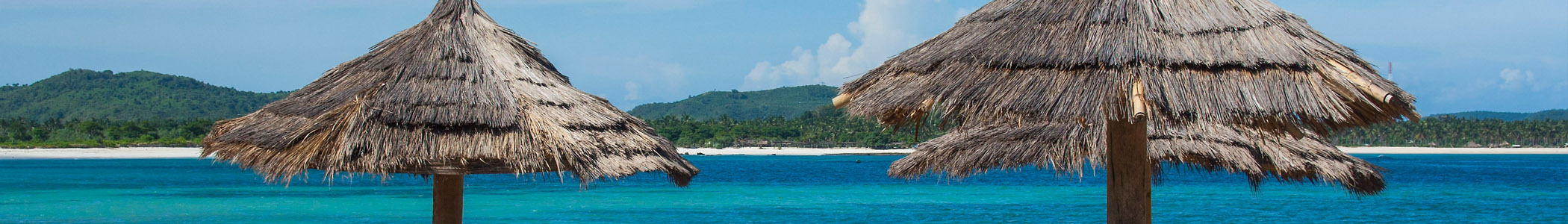
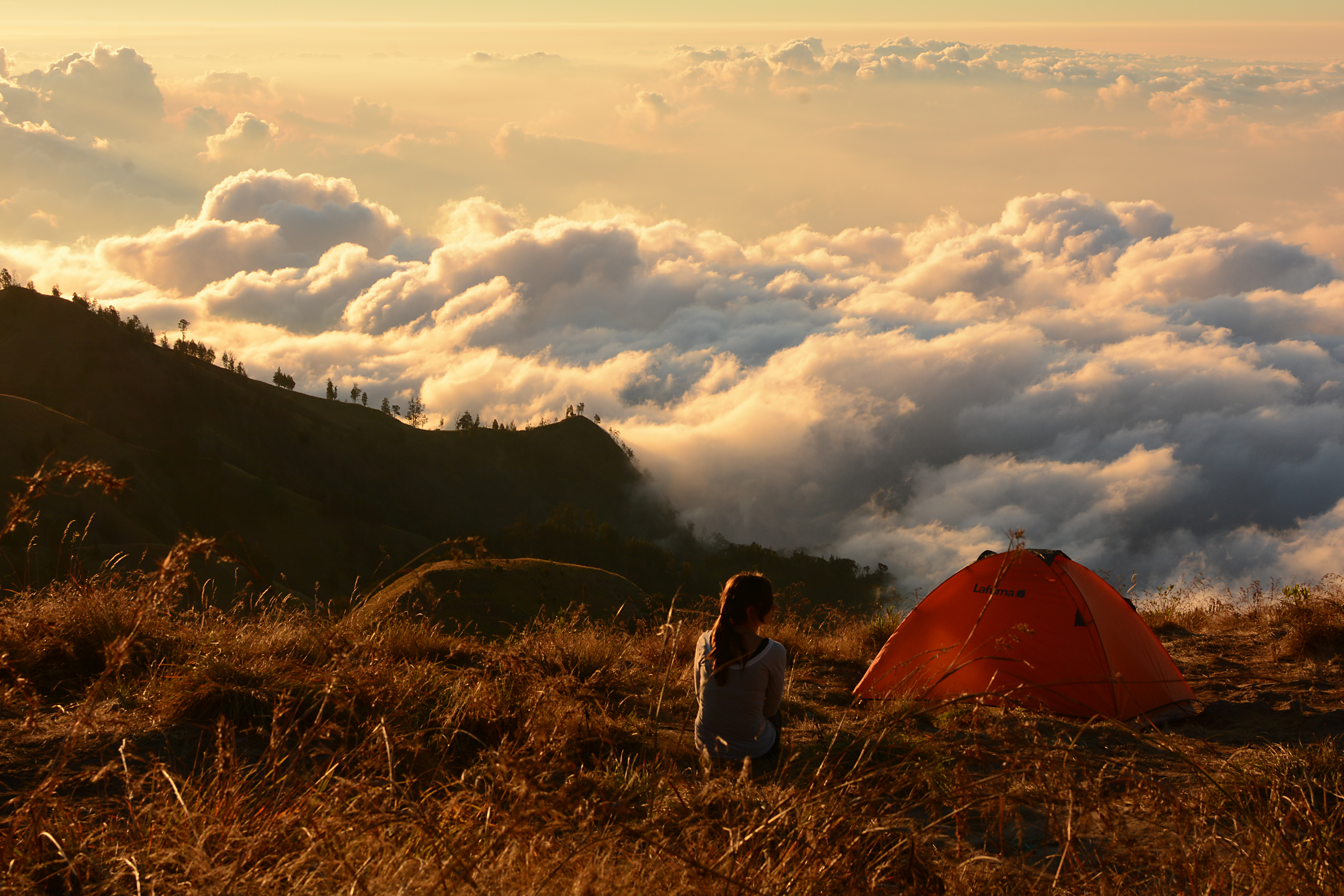
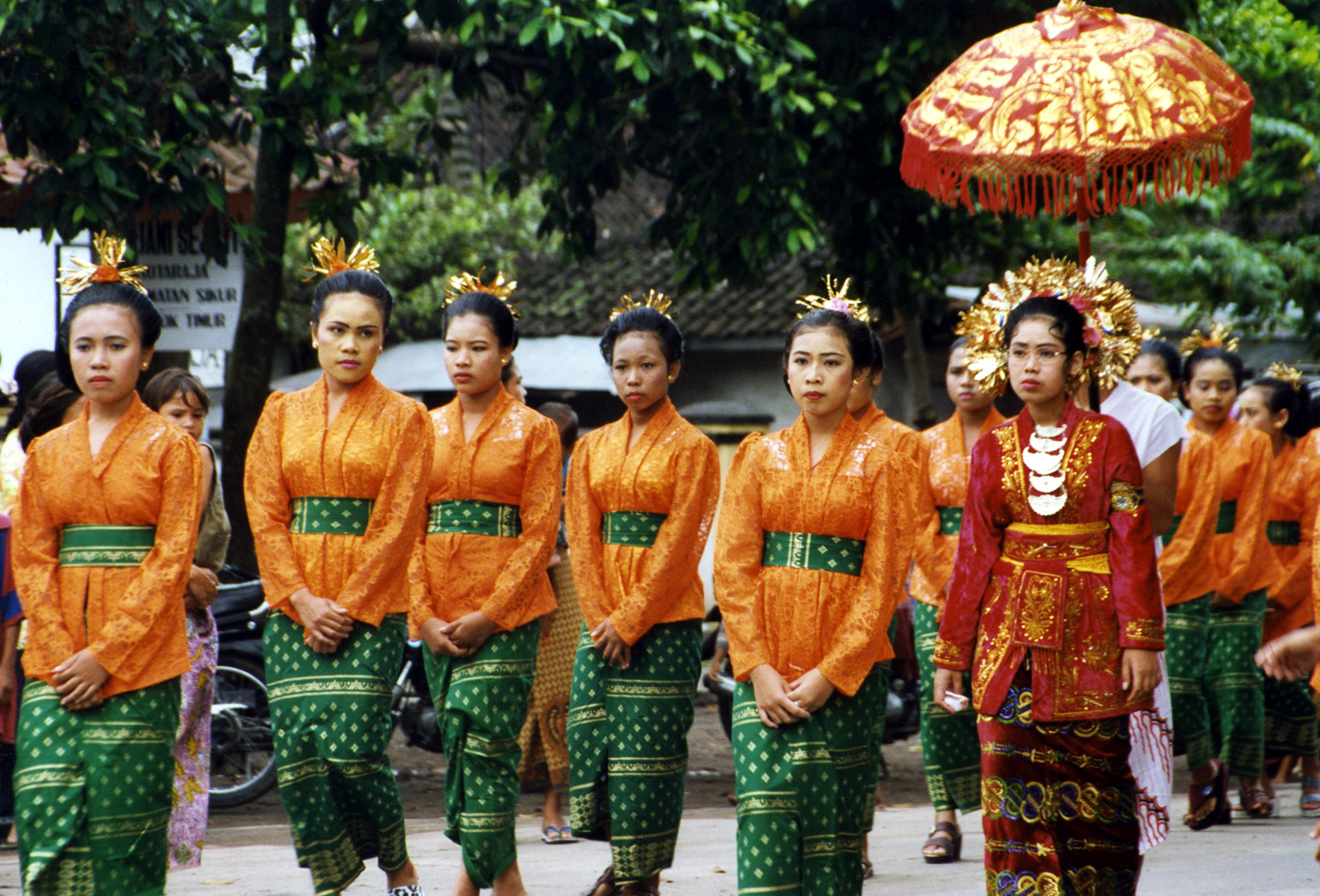
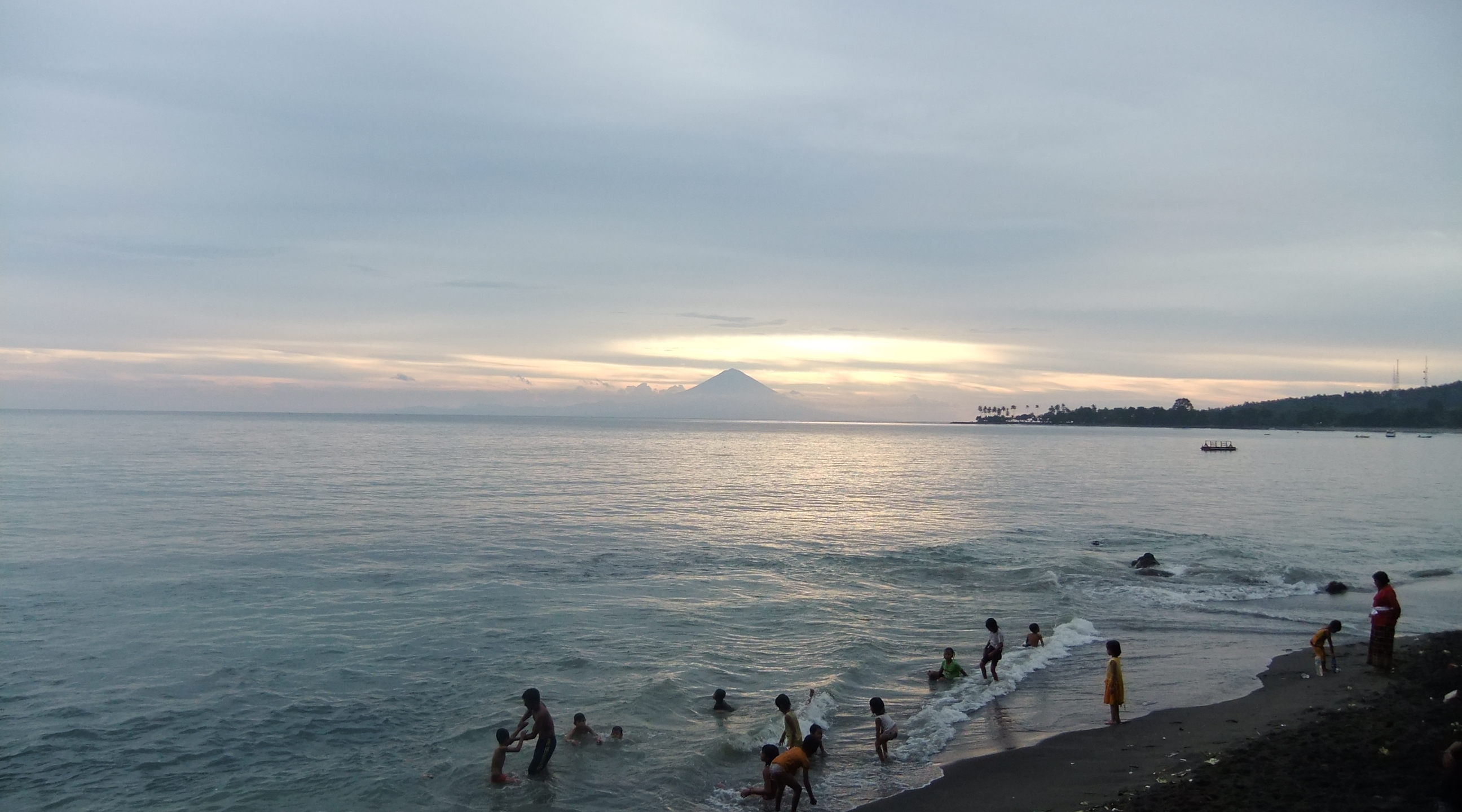
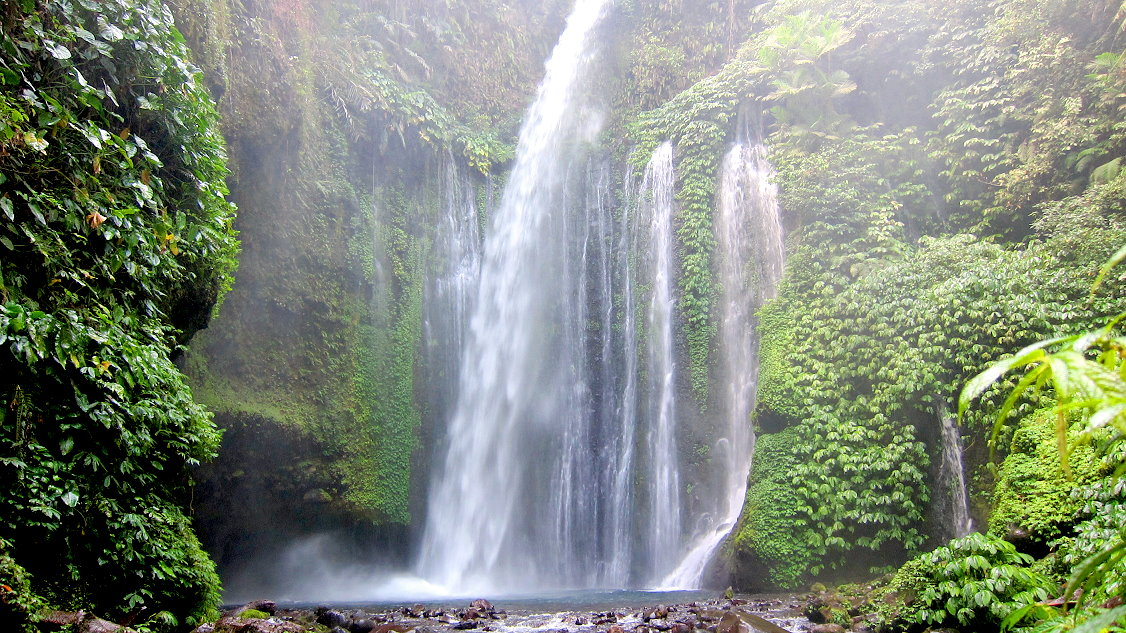
- From top, left to right: Tanjung Aan beach, camping over the top of Rinjani, Sasak wedding, Senggigi beach, and Senaru waterfall.

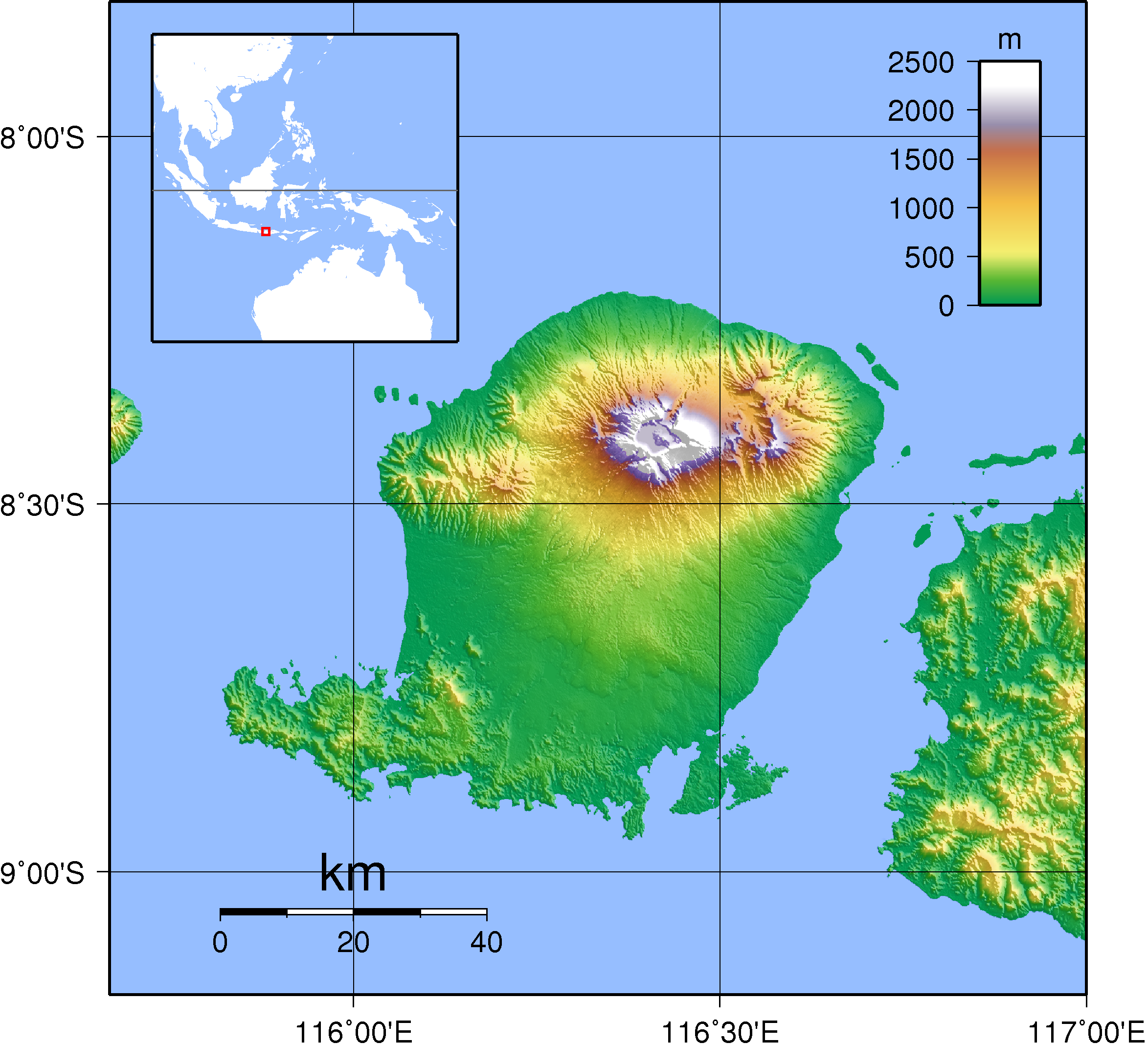
- Topography of Lombok

- Location of Lombok in Indonesia

Geography
- Location: Southeast Asia
- Coordinates: 8.565°S 116.351°E
- Archipelago: Lesser Sunda Islands
- Area: 4,566.54 km^{2} (1,763.15 sq mi)
- Area rank: 123rd
- Highest elevation: 3,727 m (12228 ft)
- Highest point: Rinjani

Administration
- Indonesia
- Province: West Nusa Tenggara
- Regencies and city: Central Lombok; East Lombok; Mataram; North Lombok; West Lombok
- Largest settlement: Mataram (pop. 445,000)

Demographics
- Demonym: Lombok Islander
- Population: 4,056,621 (mid 2024 estimate)
- Population rank: 30th
- Pop. density: 888.3/km^{2} (2300.7/sq mi)
- Languages: Sasak, Balinese, Ampenan Malay, Indonesian and others
- Ethnic groups: Major Sasak and Balinese, other Mbojo, Chinese-Indonesian, Sumbawa, Flores, Arab-Indonesian, Javanese, Buginese, Banjarese, Malay

Additional information
- Time zone: Central Indonesia Time (UTC+8)

Lombok (Note: English: /ˈlɒmbɒk/ LOM-bok; Indonesian: [ˈlɔm.bɔʔ]; Sasak: [ˈlɔm.bɔk̚]) is an island in West Nusa Tenggara province, Indonesia. It forms part of the chain of the Lesser Sunda Islands, with the Lombok Strait separating it from Bali to the west and the Alas Strait between it and Sumbawa to the east. It is roughly circular, with a "tail" (Sekotong Peninsula) to the southwest, about 70 kilometres (43 miles) across and a total area of about 4,566.54 square kilometres (1,763.15 square miles) including smaller offshore islands, making it similar in size to Trinidad or West Falkland. The provincial capital and largest city on the island is Mataram.

Lombok is somewhat similar in size and density, and shares some cultural heritage with the neighboring island of Bali to the west. However, it is administratively part of West Nusa Tenggara, along with the larger but less densely populated island of Sumbawa to the east. Lombok is surrounded by a number of smaller islands locally called Gili.

The island was home to some 3,168,692 people as recorded in the decennial 2010 census and 3,758,631 in the 2020 Census; the official estimate as at 2024 was 4,056,621. Lomboq is Sasak for straight, honest.

== History ==
The 14th century Majapahit manuscript Nagarakretagama canto 14 mentioned "Lombok Mirah" as one of island identified under Majapahit suzerainty. Other than the Babad Lombok document which records the 1257 Samalas eruption, little is known about Lombok before the seventeenth century. Before this time it was made up of numerous competing and feuding petty states, each of which was presided over by a Sasak 'prince'. This disunity was taken advantage of by the neighbouring Balinese who took control of western Lombok in the early seventeenth century.

The Makassarese meanwhile invaded eastern Lombok from their colonies in neighbouring Sumbawa. The Dutch had first visited Lombok in 1674 and the Dutch East India Company concluded its first treaty with the Sasak Princess of Lombok. The Balinese had managed to take over the whole island by 1750, but Balinese infighting resulted in the island being split into four feuding Balinese kingdoms. In 1838, the Mataram kingdom brought its rivals under control.

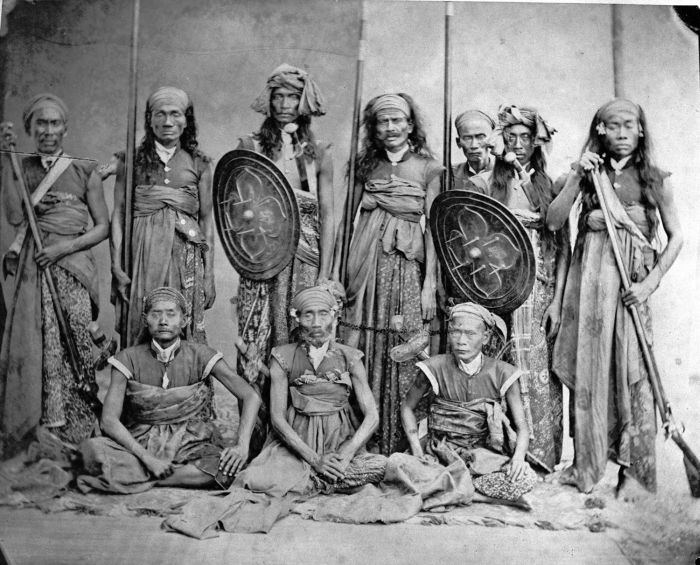
The Sasak chiefs of Lombok who allied with the Dutch to resist Karangasem occupation.

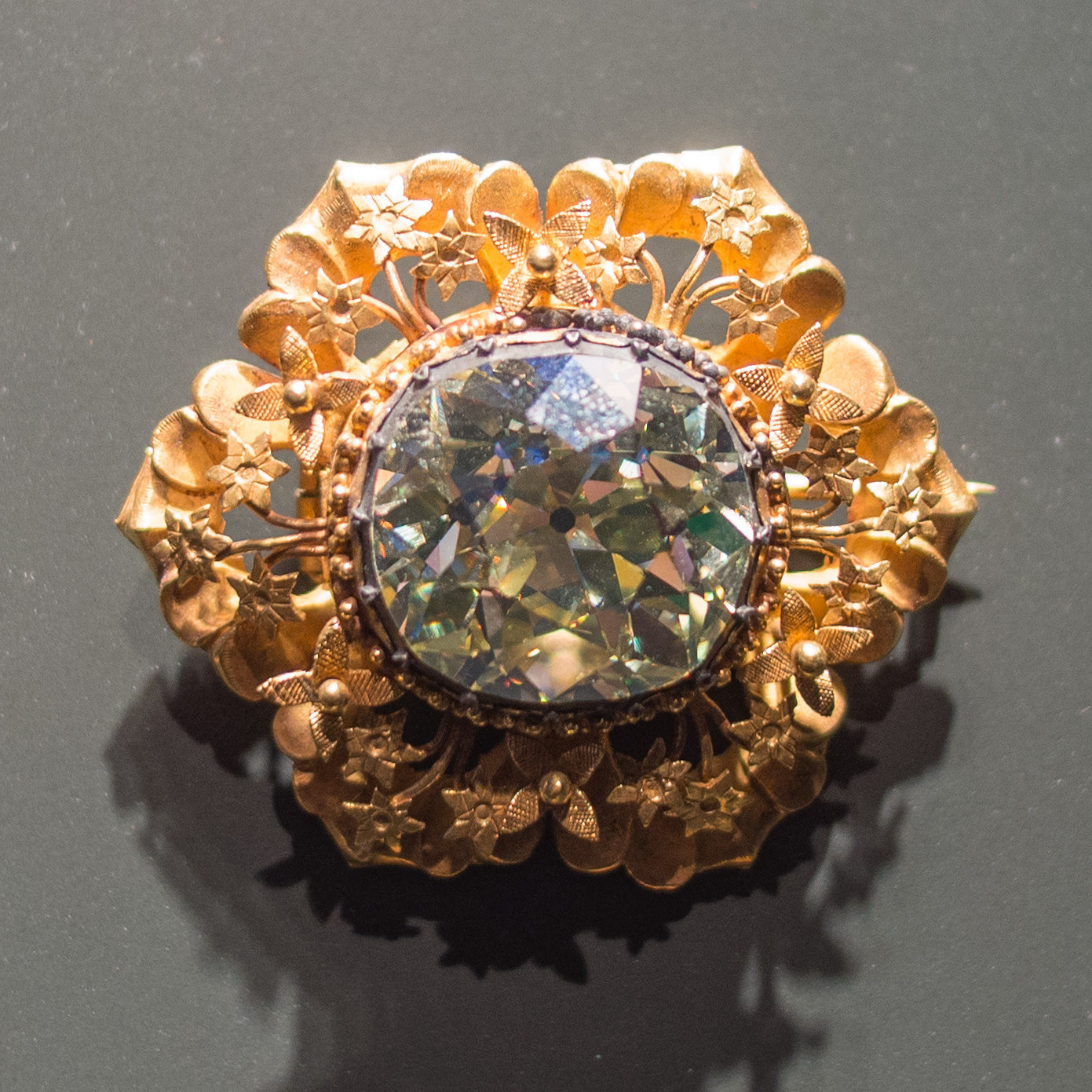
A 75-carat (15 g) diamond on exhibit at the Museum Volkenkunde, Leiden. It was taken, together with 230 kg (7,395 ozt) of gold, 7,000 kg (15,432 lb) of silver and three chests of jewels and precious stones from the royal palace of Lombok after a Dutch invasion in 1894. Only part of the treasure was handed back to Indonesia in 1977.

Relations between the Sasak and Balinese in western Lombok were largely harmonious and intermarriage was common. In the island's east, however, relations were less cordial and the Balinese maintained control from garrisoned forts. While Sasak village government remained in place, the village head became little more than a tax collector for the Balinese. Villagers became a kind of serf and Sasak aristocracy lost much of its power and land holdings.

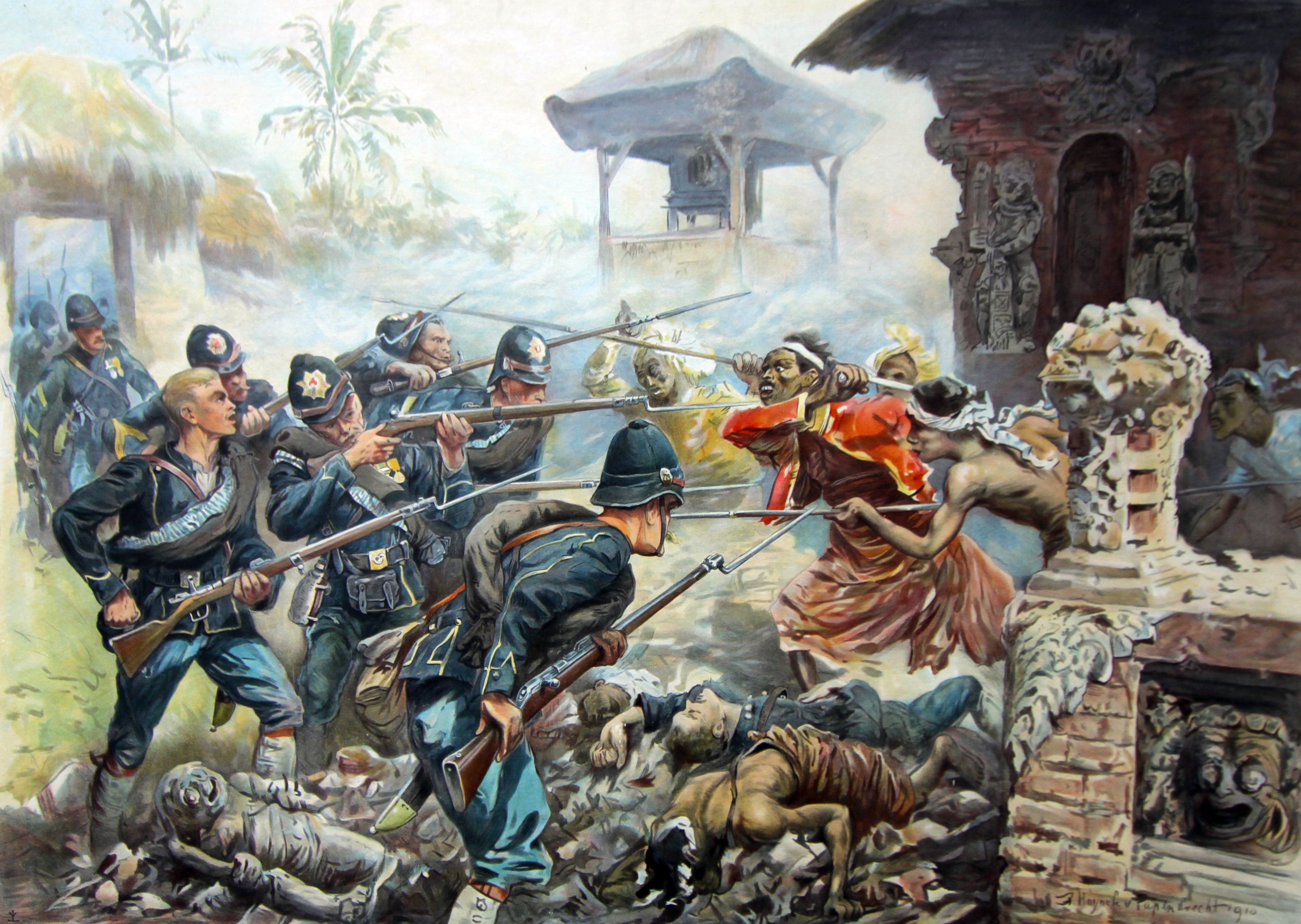
Dutch intervention in Lombok and Karangasem against the Karangasemese people of Bali in 1894.

In June 1894, the governor general of the Dutch East Indies, Van der Wijck, signed a treaty with Sasak rebels in eastern Lombok. He sent a large army to Lombok and the Balinese raja capitulated to Dutch colonizers' demands. (see Dutch intervention in Lombok) The younger princes however overruled the raja and attacked and pushed back the Dutch colonizers. The Dutch colonizers counterattacked overrunning Mataram and the raja surrendered. The entire island was annexed to the Netherlands East Indies in 1895. The Dutch colonizers ruled over Lombok's 500,000 people with a force of no more than 250 by cultivating the support of the Balinese and Sasak aristocracy.

During World War II a Japanese invasion force comprising elements of the 2nd Southern Expeditionary Fleet invaded and occupied the Lesser Sunda Islands, including the island of Lombok. They sailed from Soerabaja harbour at 09:00 hrs on 8 March 1942 and proceeded towards Lombok Island. On 9 March 1942 at 17:00 hrs the fleet sailed into port of Ampenan on Lombok Island. The Dutch defenders were soon defeated and the island occupied.

Following the cessation of hostilities the Japanese forces occupying Indonesia were withdrawn and Lombok returned temporarily to Dutch control. Following the subsequent Indonesian independence from the Dutch, the Balinese and Sasak aristocracy continued to dominate Lombok. In 1958, the island was incorporated into the province of West Nusa Tenggara with Mataram becoming the provincial capital. Mass killings of communists occurred across the island following the abortive coup attempt in Jakarta and Central Java. During President Suharto's New Order administration (1967–1998), Lombok experienced a degree of stability and development but not to the extent of the boom and wealth in Java and Bali. Crop failures led to famine in 1966 and food shortages in 1973. The national government's transmigrasi program moved a lot of people out of Lombok. The 1980s saw external developers and speculators instigate a nascent tourism boom although local's share of earnings was limited. Indonesia's political and economic crises of the late 1990s hit Lombok hard. In January 2000, riots broke out across Mataram with Christians and ethnic Chinese the main victims, with alleged agents provocateur from outside Lombok. Tourism slumped, but in recent years has seen a renewed growth.

=== 2018 earthquakes ===
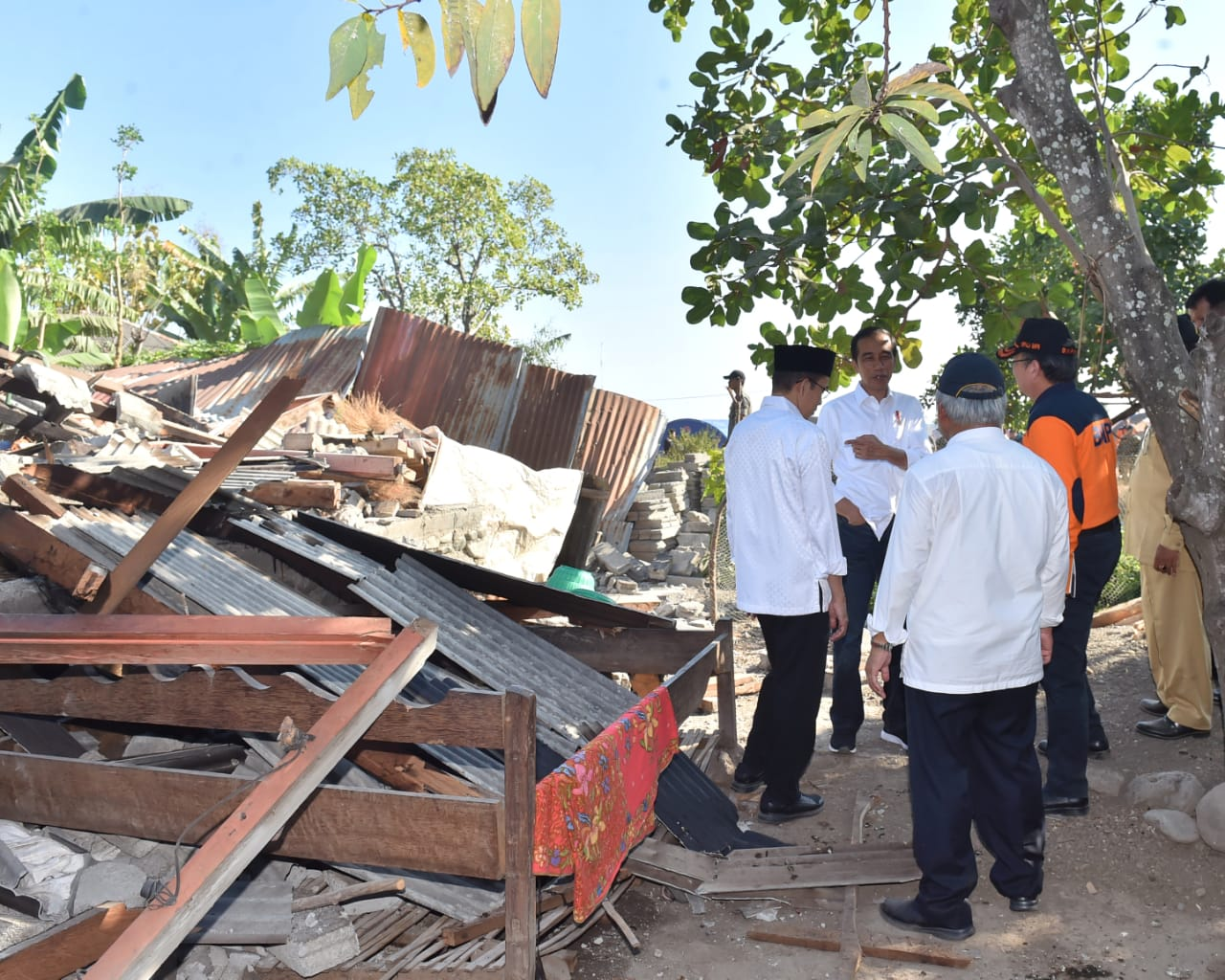
President Joko Widodo examining the earthquake damage.

The July 2018 Lombok earthquake killed 20 people and injured hundreds more. The earthquake caused significant damage to Lombok island and was the foreshock of a larger earthquake that followed eight days later. The 5 August 2018 Lombok earthquake had a moment magnitude of 7.0, and it caused catastrophic damage to North Lombok and also caused damage to nearby Bali. In total, it caused over 550 deaths and more than 7000 were injured. Another Lombok earthquake occurred on 19 August 2018, killing 13 people and damaging 1800 buildings.

Initially, the Indonesian National Board for Disaster Management refused international aid, claiming "earthquakes did not constitute a national emergency" and that locals were capable enough to respond without help. However, the infrastructure for disaster management and relief was not adequately in place in and around Lombok; therefore, the first responders to the disaster were stretched local government agencies such as police & military personnel, domestic and foreign volunteers and business owners in the parts of Lombok that were less affected by the quakes, including the Gili islands. Small scale international fundraising initiatives were organised through social networks and the web to help source basic resources such as food and clean water, and begin assisting with temporary and permanent shelter. This was vital in the early stages of the disaster, before larger scale government assistance arrived.

== Geography ==
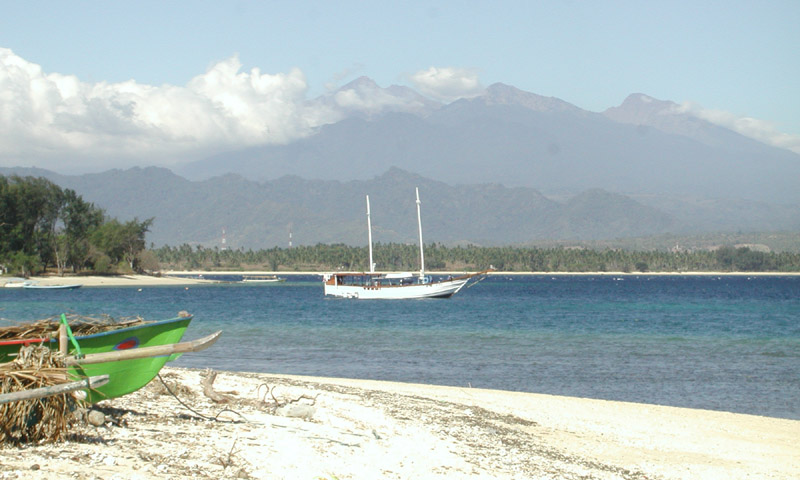
Mount Rinjani seen from Gili Air

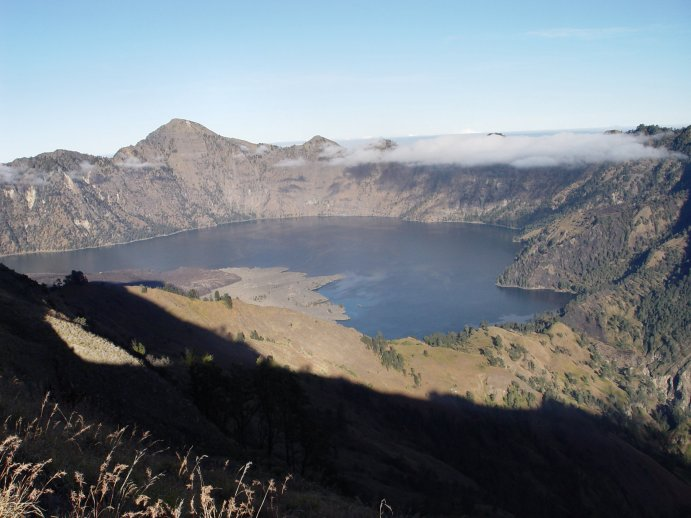
Lake Segara Anak on top of Mt. Rinjani

The island is to the immediate east of the Lombok Strait which marks the biogeographical division between the fauna of the Indomalayan realm and the distinctly different fauna of Australasia; this distinction, known as the "Wallace Line" (or "Wallace's Line") takes its name from Alfred Russel Wallace (1823–1913), who was the first person to comment on the division between the two regions, as well as on the abrupt boundary between the two biomes. Lombok is part of the Lesser Sundas deciduous forests ecoregion.

Song of the rare Rinjani scops owl

To the east of Lombok lies the Alas Strait, a narrow body of water separating the island of Lombok from the nearby island of Sumbawa.

The island's topography is dominated by the centrally located stratovolcano Mount Rinjani, the second-highest volcano in Indonesia, which rises to 3,726 metres (12,224 ft), making Lombok the 8th-highest island. The most recent eruption of Rinjani occurred in September 2016 at Gunung Barujari. In a 2010 eruption, ash was reported as rising 2 kilometres (1.2 miles) into the atmosphere from the Barujari cone in Rinjani's caldera lake of Segara Anak. Lava flowed into the caldera lake, raising its temperature, while ash fall damaged crops on the slopes of Rinjani. The volcano and its crater lake, Segara Anak (child of the sea), are protected by the Gunung Rinjani National Park established in 1997. Recent evidence indicates an ancient volcano, Mount Samalas, of which now only a caldera remains, was the source of the 1257 Samalas eruption, one of the largest volcanic eruptions in recorded history, which caused worldwide changes in weather.

The highlands of Lombok are forest-clad and mostly undeveloped. The lowlands are highly cultivated. Rice, soybeans, coffee, tobacco, cotton, cinnamon, cacao, cloves, cassava, corn, coconuts, copra, bananas and vanilla are the major crops grown in the fertile soils of the island. The southern part of the island is fertile but drier, especially toward the southern coastline.

=== List of islands ===
Lombok is surrounded by many islets, including:

- Northwest: colloquially the Gili Islands (North Lombok Regency)
  - Gili Trawangan
  - Gili Meno
  - Gili Air
- Northeast (East Lombok Regency)
  - Gili Lawang
  - Gili Sulat
  - Gili Petagan
  - Gili Bidara (Pasaran)
  - Gili Lampu
  - Gili Puyu
  - Gili Kondo
  - East Coast of Nusa Tenggara
  - Gili Puyuh
  - Gili Sulat
- Southeast (East Lombok Regency)
  - Gili Indah
  - Gili Merengke
  - Gili Belek
  - Gili Ular
- South Coast (West Lombok Regency)
  - Gili Solet
  - Gili Sarang Burung
  - Gili Kawu
  - Gili Puyuh
- Southwest (Sekotong Peninsula, West Lombok Regency)
  - Gili Nanggu
  - Gili Sudak
  - Gili Tangkong
  - Gili Kedis
  - Gili Poh
  - Gili Genting
  - Gili Lontar
  - Gili Layar
  - Gili Amben
  - Gili Gede
  - Gili Anyaran
  - Gili Layar
  - Gili Asahan

== Water problem ==
The water supply in Lombok is stressed and this places strain both upon the water supply of the provincial capital, Mataram, and upon that of the island in general. The southern and central areas are reported to be the most critically affected. West Nusa Tenggara province in general is threatened with a water crisis caused by increasing forest and water table damage and degradation, and increased human population demands. 16 km^{2} (4,000 acres) of a total of 196 km^{2} (48,000 acres) are thought to have been affected. The Head of Built Environment and Security Forest Service Forest West Nusa Tenggara Andi Pramari stated in Mataram on Wednesday, May 6, 2009, that, "If this situation is not addressed it can be expected that within five years it may be difficult for people to obtain water in this part of NTB (West Nusa Tenggara). Not only that, the productivity of agriculture in value added will fall, and the residents are experiencing water deficiency in their wells". High cases of timber theft in the region of NTB are contributing to this problem.

In September 2010 in Central Lombok, some villagers reportedly walked for several hours to fetch a single pail of water. Nieleando, a small coastal village about 50 kilometers from the provincial capital, Mataram, has seen dry wells for years. Occasionally this problem escalates sufficiently for disputes and fighting between villagers to occur. The problems have been reported to be most pronounced in the districts of Jonggat, Janapria, Praya Timur, Praya Barat, Praya Barat Daya and Pujut. In 2010 provincial authorities declared all six districts drought areas. Sumbawa, the other main island of the province, also experienced severe drought in 2010, making it a province-wide issue.

Areas in southern Lombok Island were classified as arid and prone to water shortages due to low rainfall and lack of water sources. In May 2011, groundbreaking began on Pandanduri dam construction, which will span about 430 hectares and cost an estimated Rp.800 billion ($92.8 million). When finished, the dam will accommodate about 25.7 million cubic meters of water and be able to irrigate 10,350 hectares of farmland. Project construction was expected to last five years.

== Demographics ==
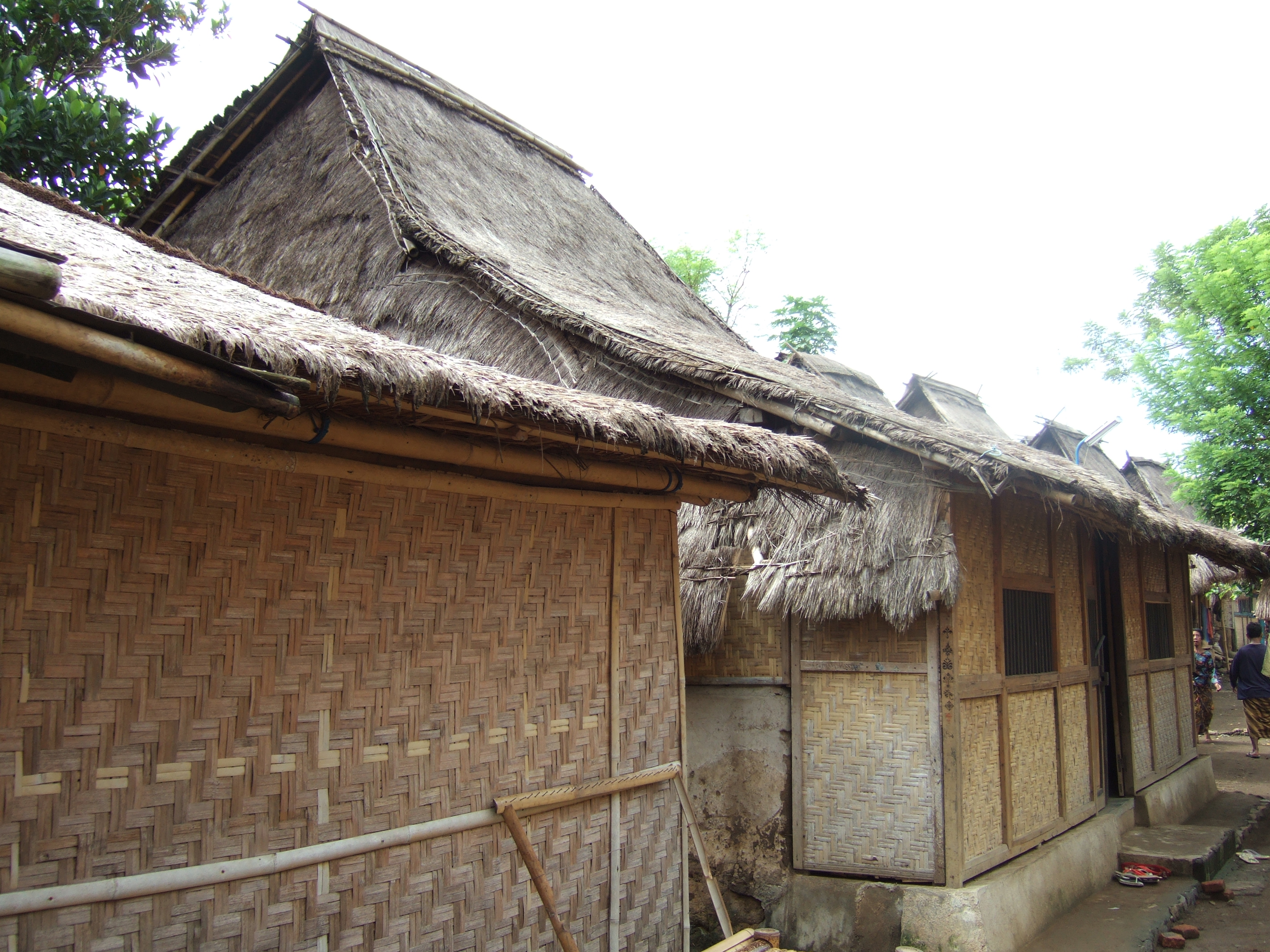
Traditional Sasak houses.

The island's inhabitants are 85% Sasak, whose ancestors are thought to have migrated from Java in the first millennium BC. Other residents include an estimated 10–15% Balinese, with the small remainder being Chinese-Peranakan Indonesians, Javanese, Sumbawa and Arab Indonesians.

The Sasak population are culturally and linguistically closely related to the Balinese, but unlike the Hindu Balinese, the majority are Muslim and the landscape is punctuated with mosques and minarets. Islamic traditions and holidays influence the Island's daily activities.

In 2008 the Island of Lombok had 866,838 households and an average of 3.635 persons per household. The 2020 census recorded a population of 5,320,092 people in the province of NTB; the official estimate as at mid 2022 was 5,590,359 of which over 70.9% reside on Lombok, giving it a population of 3,963,842 at that date, similar to New Zealand's North Island.

== Religion ==
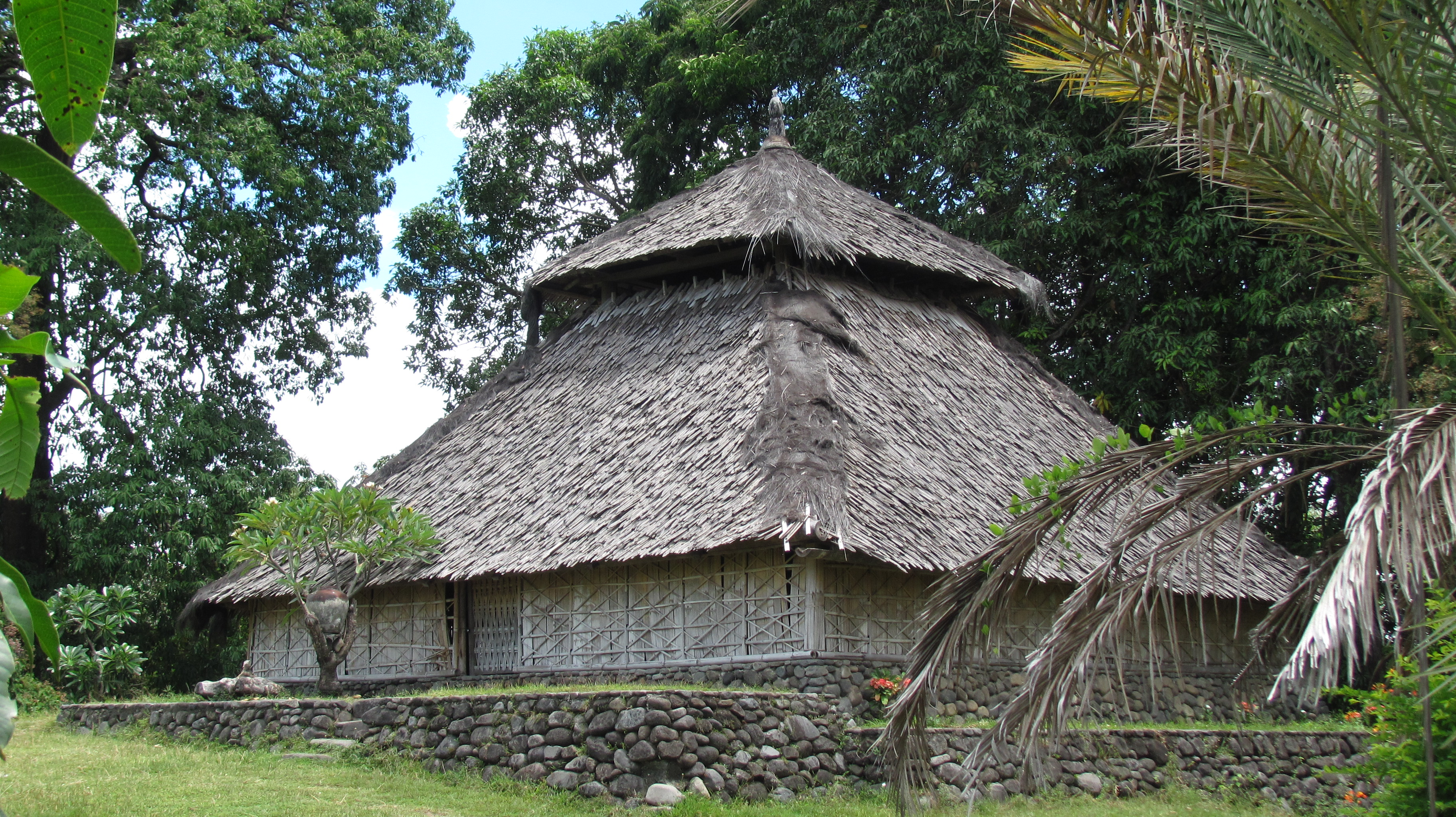
The oldest mosque dating from 1634 in Bayan.

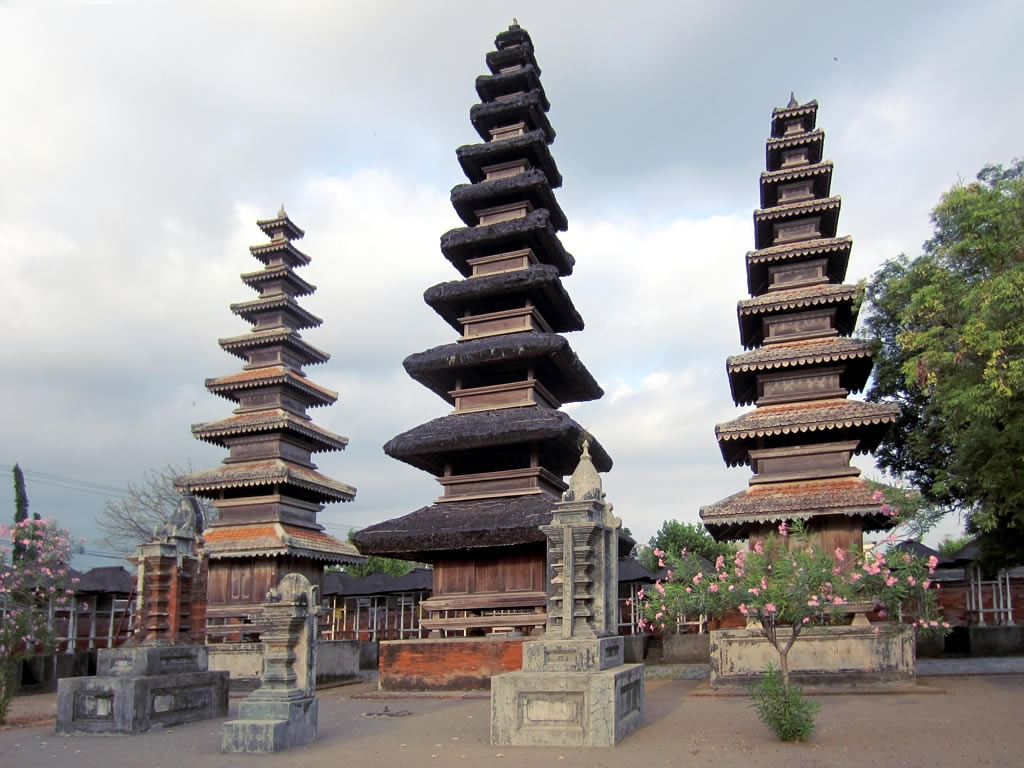
Pura Meru in Mataram, a Hindu temple built in 1720.

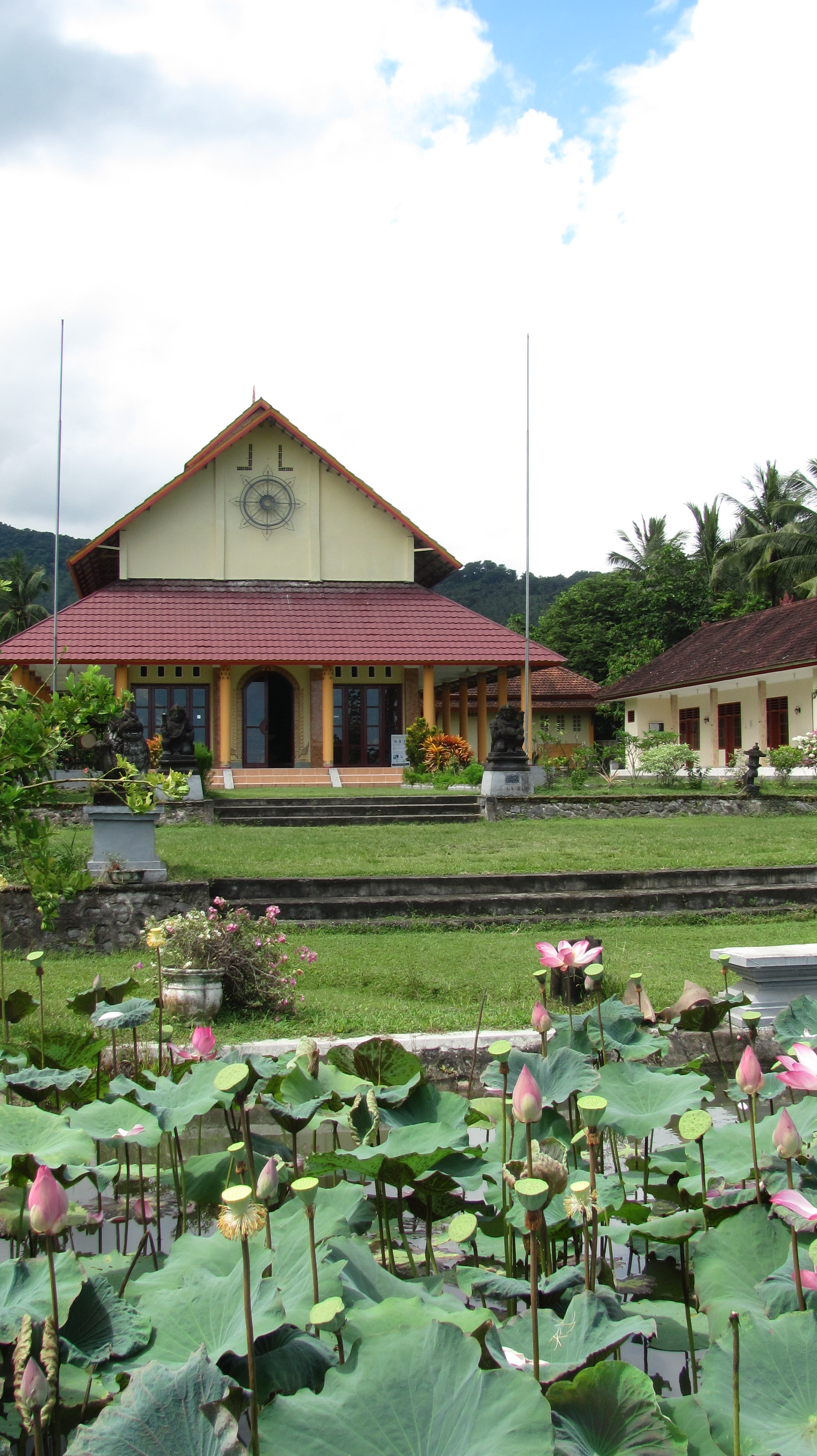
Buddhist Temple near Tanjung on the north coast.

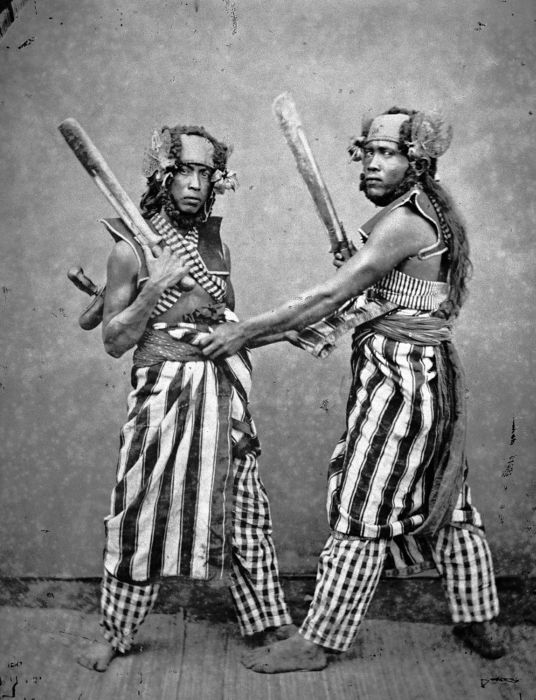
Indigenous Sasak dancers performing traditional Lombok wardance c. 1880

The island's indigenous Sasak people are predominantly Muslim. However, before the arrival of Islam Lombok experienced a long period of Hindu and Buddhist influence that reached the island through Java. A minority Balinese Hindu culture remains in Lombok. Islam may have first been brought to Lombok by traders arriving from Sumbawa in the 17th century who then established a following in eastern Lombok. Other accounts describe the first influences arriving in the first half of the sixteenth century. The palm leaf manuscript Babad Lombok which contains the history of Lombok describes how Sunan Prapen was sent by his father The Susuhunan Ratu of Giri on a military expedition to Lombok and Sumbawa in order to convert the population and propagate the new religion. A more orthodox version of Islam increased in popularity in the early twentieth century. The Indonesian government religionisation programs (acquiring of a religion) in Lombok during 1967 and 1968 led to a period of some considerable confusion in religious allegiances and practices. These religionization programs later led to the emergence of more conformity in religious practices in Lombok.

The Hindu minority religion is still practised in Lombok alongside the majority Muslim religion. Hinduism is followed by ethnic Balinese and by a minority of the indigenous Sasak. All the main Hindu religious ceremonies are celebrated in Lombok and there are many villages throughout Lombok that have a Hindu majority population. According to local legends two of the oldest villages on the island, Bayan, and Sembalun, were founded by a prince of Majapahit. According to the 2010 population census declared adherents of Hinduism numbered 101,000 people with the highest concentration in the Mataram Regency where they accounted for 14% of the population.

The Nagarakertagama, the 14th-century palm leaf poem that was found on Lombok places the island as one of the vassals of the Majapahit empire. This manuscript contained detailed descriptions of the Majapahit Kingdom and also affirmed the importance of Hindu-Buddhism in the Majapahit empire by describing temple, palaces and several ceremonial observances.

Christianity is practised by a small minority including some ethnic Chinese and immigrants from Bali and East Nusa Tenggara. There are Roman Catholic churches and parishes in Ampenan, Mataram, Praya and Tanjung. There is a Catholic hospital in Mataram as well. Two Buddhist temples can be visited in and around Tanjung where about 800 Buddhists live.

The history of a small Arab community in Lombok has history dating back to early settlement by traders from Yemen. The community is still evident mainly in Ampenan, the old Port of Mataram. Due to the siting of a UNHCR refugee centre in Lombok some refugees from middle eastern countries have intermarried with Lombok people.

A non-orthodox Islamic group found only on Lombok are the Wektu Telu ("Three Times"), who performed three obligatory daily prayers (Salah) instead of five observed by majority of Muslim elsewhere. (Note: The authority for the basic forms and number of the salah (daily prayer) is neither the hadiths nor the Quran, but rather the consensus of Muslims.) Waktu Telu beliefs are entwined with animism, and is influenced not only by Islam, but also Hinduism and pantheistic beliefs. There are also remnants of Boda who maintain native Sasak beliefs and could be representative of an original Sasak culture, undiluted by later Islamic influences.

Many influences of animist belief prevail within the Sasak people, most of whom believe in the existence of spirits or ghosts. They regard both food and prayer as indispensable whenever they seek to communicate with spirits, including the dead and ritualistic traditional practices endure. Traditional magic is practised to ward off evil and illness and to seek solutions to disputations and antipathy. Magic may be practised by an individual alone but normally a person experienced in such things is sought out to render a service. Normally money or gifts are made to this person and the most powerful practitioners are treated with considerable respect.

== Economy and politics ==
Many of the visitors to Lombok and much of the island's goods come across the Lombok Strait by sea or air links from Bali. Only 40 kilometres (25 mi) separate the two islands. Lombok is often marketed as "an unspoiled Bali" or "Bali's sister island". The vast majority of tourists to the island are from the Asia-Pacific region, particularly from nearby Australia. With support from the central government, Lombok and several other islands are being developed as Indonesia's second destination for international and domestic tourism. Lombok has retained a more natural, uncrowded and undeveloped environment, which attract travellers who come for its relaxed pace and the opportunity to explore the island's unspoiled natural environment. The more contemporary marketing campaigns for Lombok/Sumbawa seek to differentiate from Bali and promote the island of Lombok as a standalone destination. The opening of the Lombok International Airport on 1 October 2011 assisted in this endeavour.

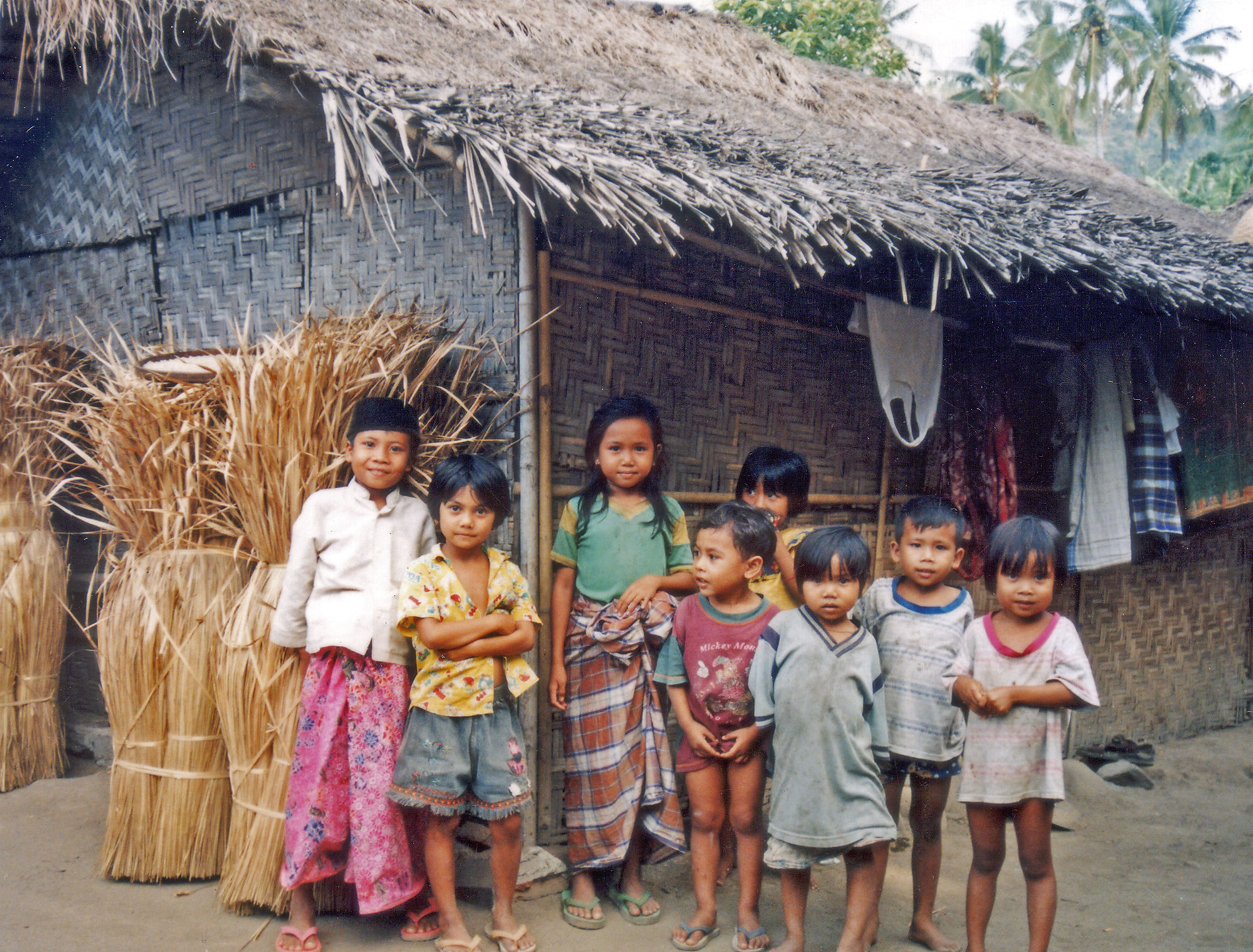
Local Sasak children (c. 1997)

Nusa Tenggara Barat and Lombok may be considered economically depressed by First World standards and a large majority of the population live in poverty. Still, the island is fertile, has sufficient rainfall in most areas for agriculture, and possesses a variety of climate zones. Consequently, food in abundant quantity and variety is available inexpensively at local farmer's markets, though locals still suffer from famine due to drought and subsistence farming. A family of four can eat rice, vegetables, and fruit for as little as US$0.50. Even though a family's income may be as small as US$1.00 per day from fishing or farming, many families are able to live a contented and productive life on a low income. However, the people of Lombok are coming under increasing pressure from rising food and fuel prices. Access to housing, education and health services remains difficult for many of the island's indigenous population although public education is free throughout the province and an attempt is made to provide elementary schools even in remote areas.

The percentage of the population living in poverty in urban areas of Nusa Tenggara Barat in 2008 was 29.47% and in 2009 it was 28.84%. For those living in rural areas in 2008 it was 19.73% and in 2009 it reduced marginally to 18.40%. For combined urban and village the figures were 23.81% and in 2009 it fell slightly to 22.78%.

In Mataram in 2008 the percentage of the population that was unmarried was 40.74%, married 52.01%, divorced 2.51% and widowed 4.75%.

Illegal cage bird trade has been observed in the city of Mataram and during five market visits in 2018 and 2019, 10,326 birds of 108 species were observed, with 18 of these species being nationally protected and many others harvested from the wild in violation of national harvest and trade quotas.

== Administration ==
Lombok is under the administration of the Governor of the province of West Nusa Tenggara (Nusa Tenggara Barat). The province is administered from the provincial capital of Mataram in West Lombok.

The island is administratively divided into four kabupaten (regencies) and one kota (city). They are as follows, with their administrative capitals, their areas, and their populations at the 2010 census and the 2020 census, together with the official estimates as at mid 2024.

Kode Wilayah	Name of City or Regency	Capital	Area in km^{2}	Pop'n 2010 census	Pop'n 2020 census	Pop'n mid 2024 estimate	HDI 2014 estimates
52.01	West Lombok Regency (Lombok Barat)	Gerung	922.91	599,986	721,481	763,757	0.635 (Medium)
52.02	Central Lombok Regency (Lombok Tengah)	Praya	1,168.13	860,209	1,034,859	1,128,716	0.618 (Medium)
52.03	East Lombok Regency (Lombok Timur)	Selong	1,605.55	1,105,582	1,325,240	1,457,591	0.620 (Medium)
52.08	North Lombok Regency (Lombok Utara)	Tanjung	809.53	200,072	247,400	261,557	0.601 (Medium)
52.71	Mataram City		60.42	402,843	429,651	445,000	0.759 (High)
	Total Lombok		4,566.54	3,168,692	3,758,631	4,056,621	

== Tourism ==
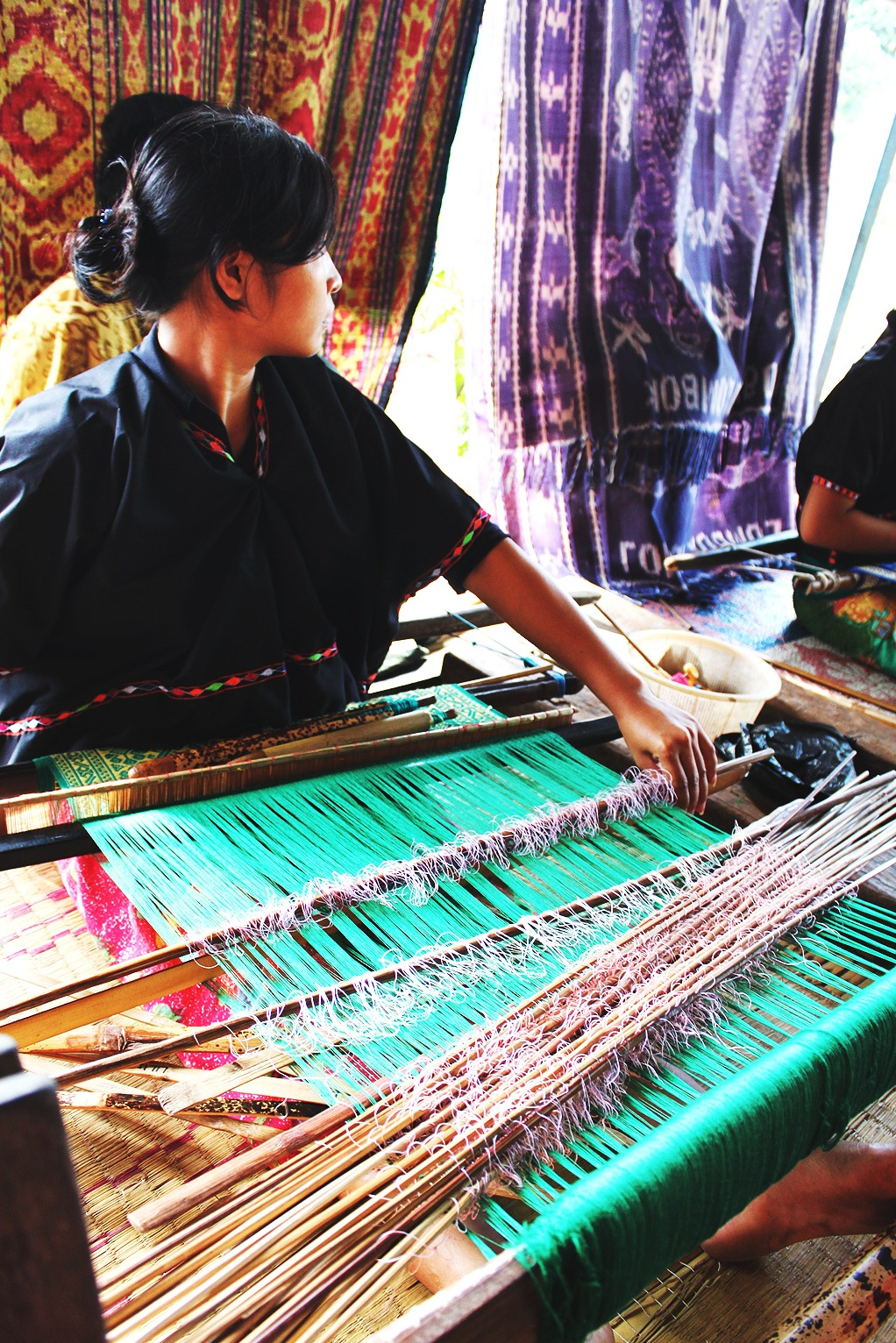
One of the unique traditional crafts from Lombok

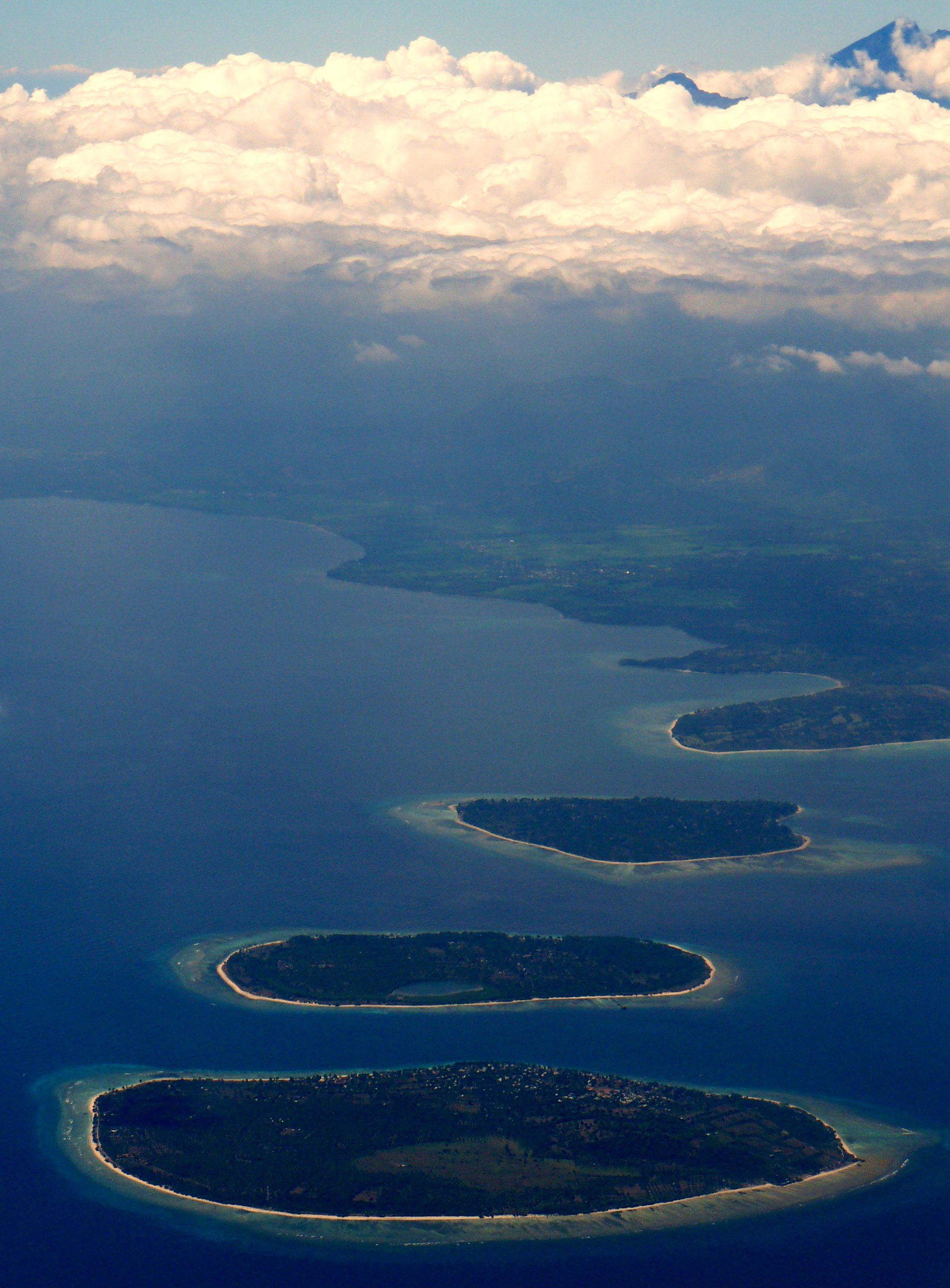
The Gili Islands

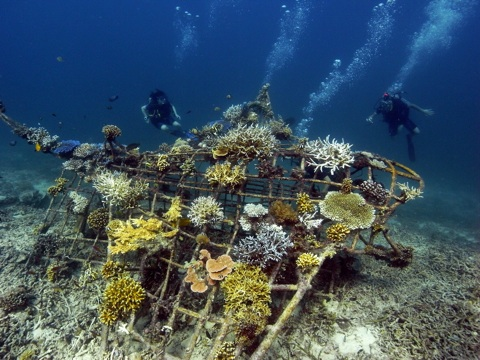
Manta ray Biorock reef in Gili Islands

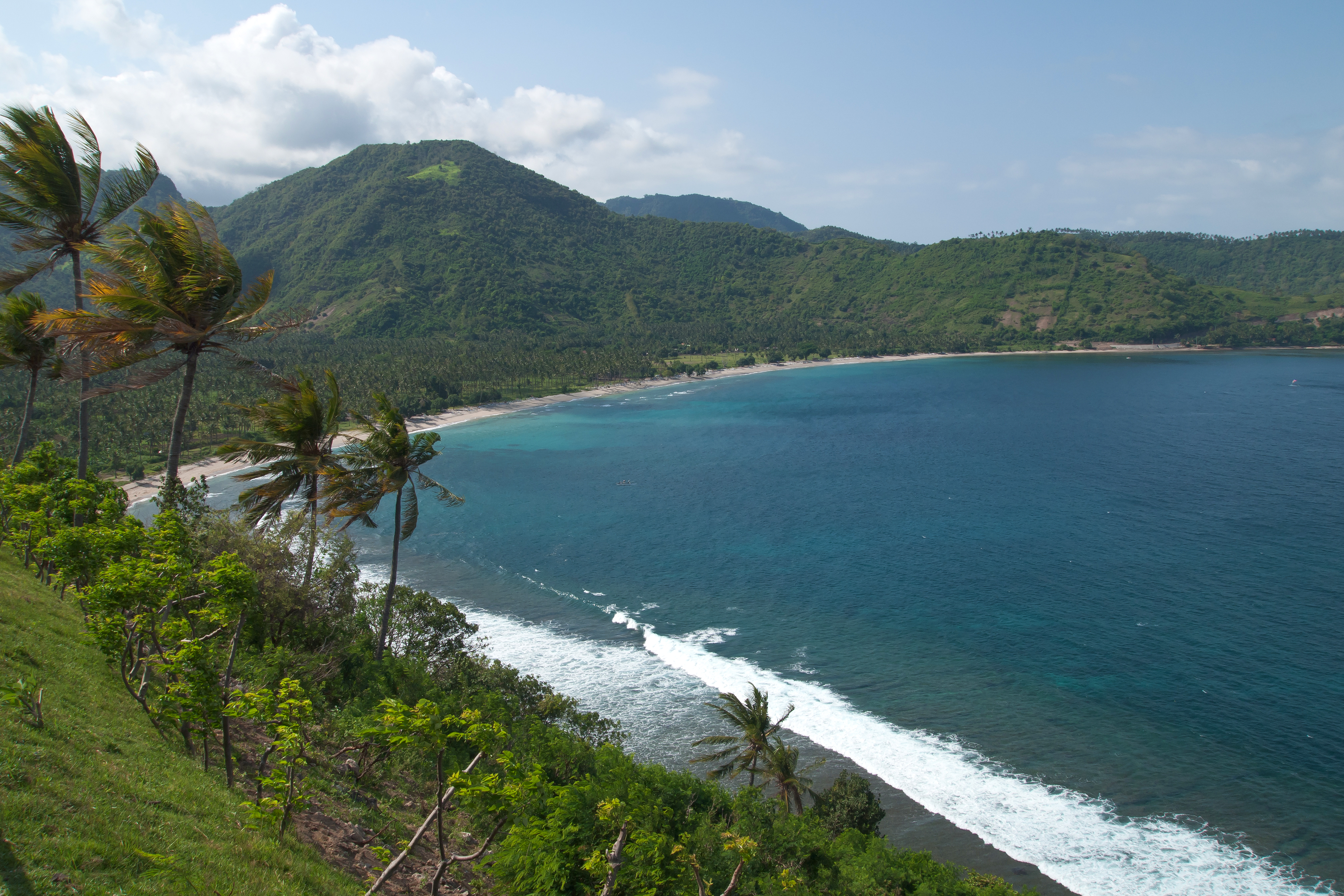
Pandanan Bay

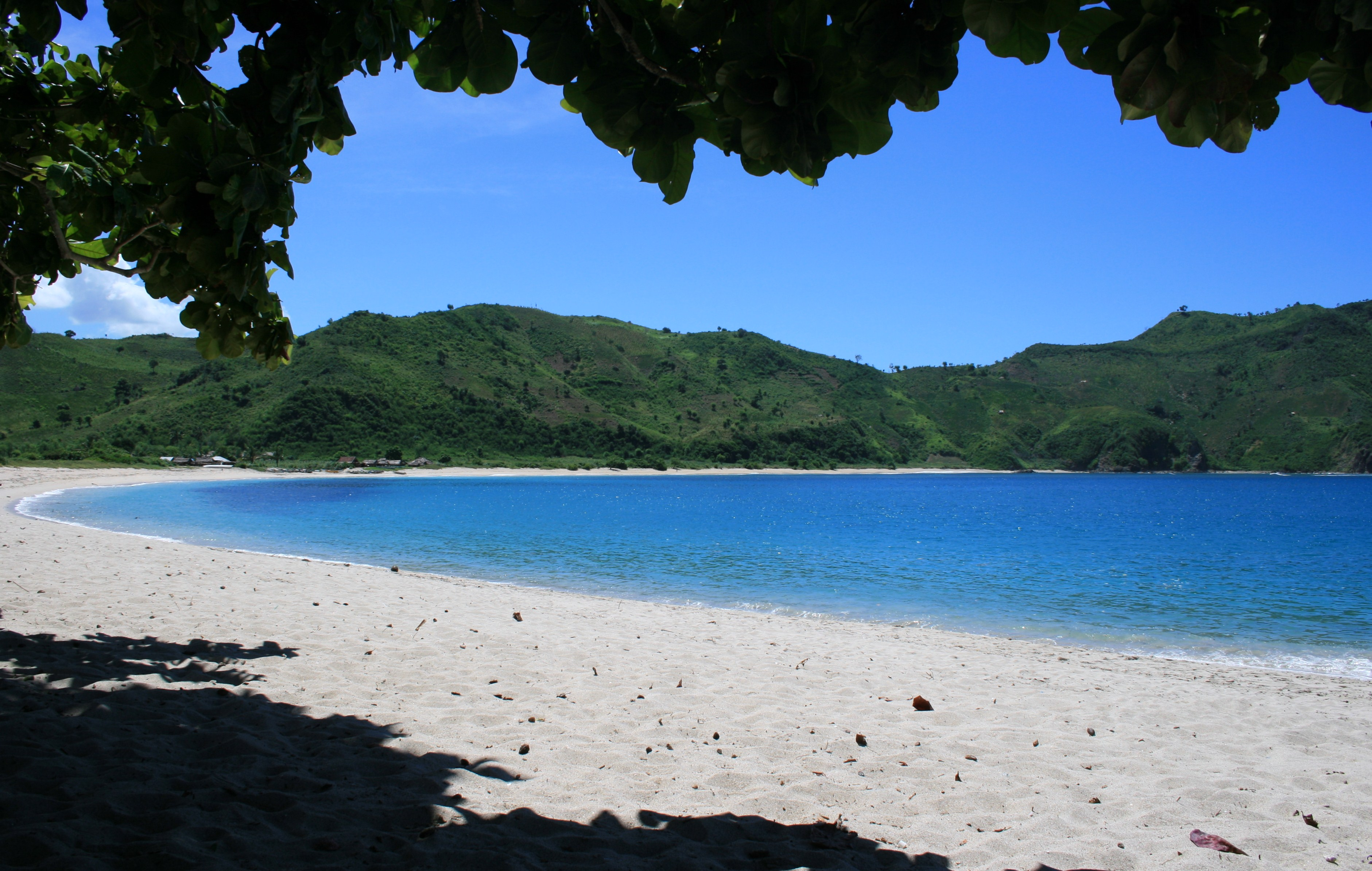
Mawun Beach

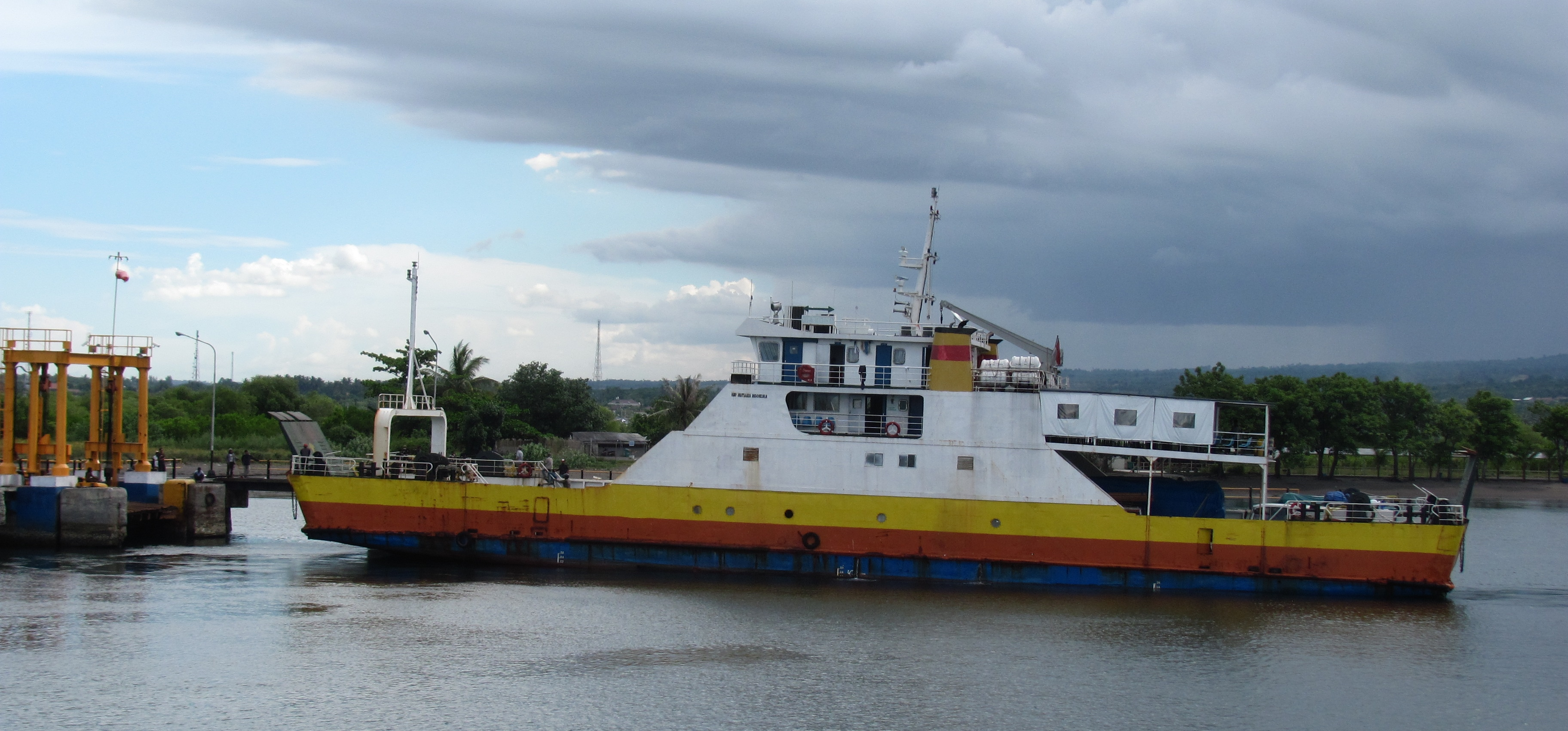
Harbour of Labuhan Lombok

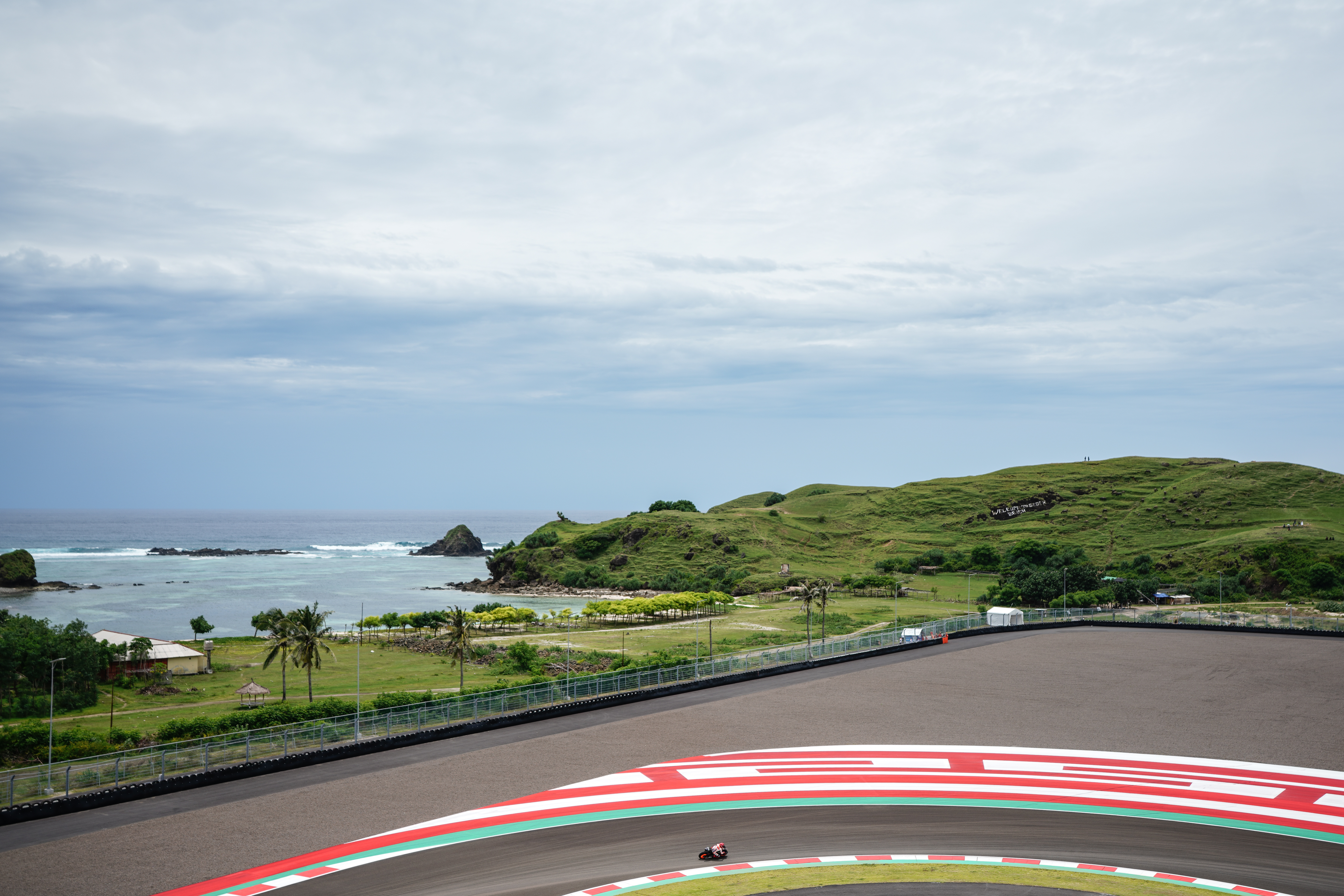
Seger Beach, overlooked by the Mandalika International Street Circuit

=== Pre-1997 ===
Tourist development started in the mid-1980s when Lombok attracted attention as an 'unspoiled' alternative to Bali. Initially, low budget bungalows proliferated at places like the Gili islands and Kuta, Lombok on the South Coast. These tourist accommodations were largely owned by and operated by local business entrepreneurs. Areas in proximity to the airport, places like Senggigi, experienced rampant land speculation for prime beachfront land by big businesses from outside Lombok.

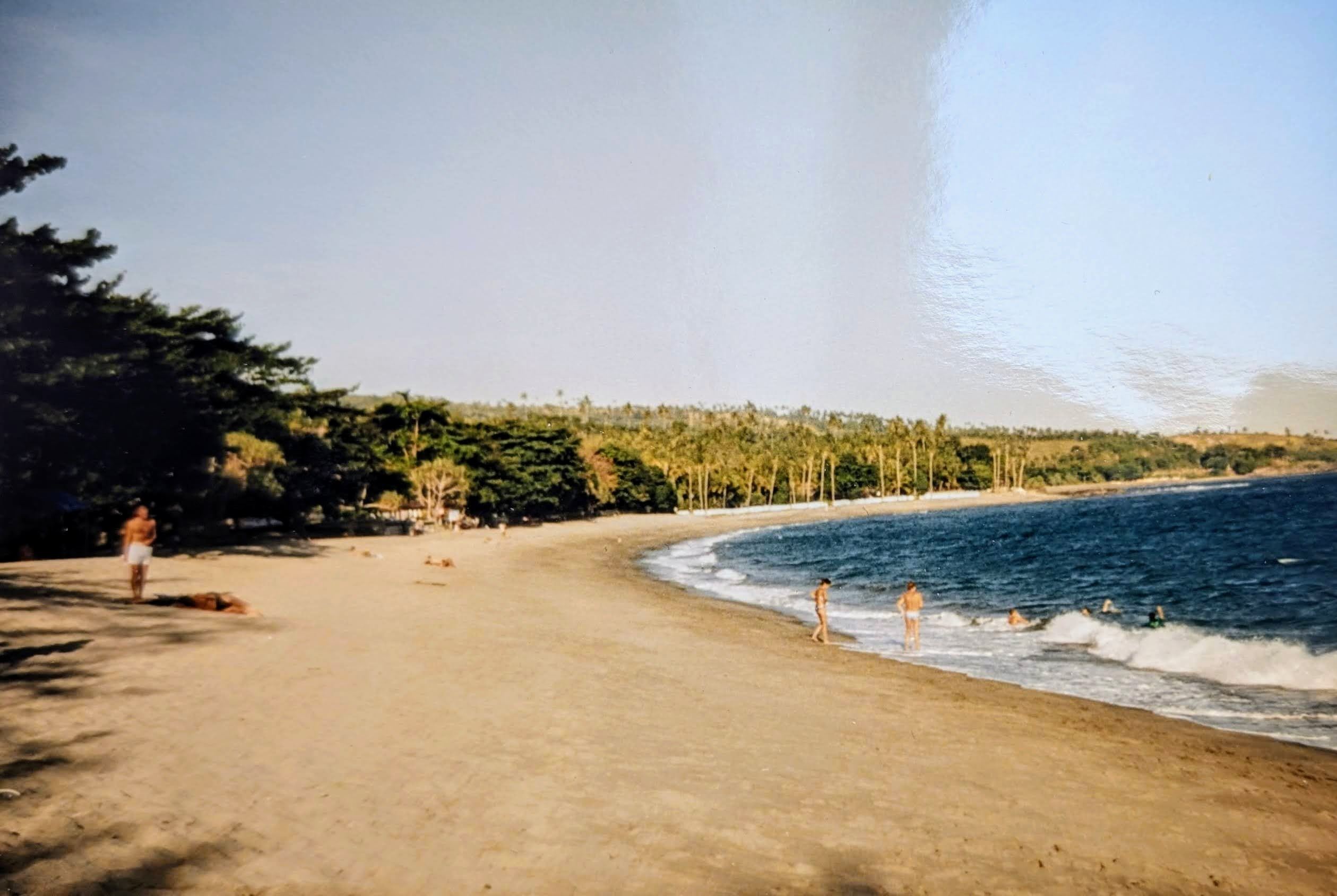
Senggigi Beach July 1995

In the 1990s the national government in Jakarta began to take an active role in planning for and promoting Lombok's tourism. Private organizations like the Bali Tourism Development Corporation (BTDC) and the Lombok Tourism Development Corporation (LTDC) were formed. LTDC prepared detailed land use plans with maps and areas zoned for tourist facilities. Large hotels provide primary employment for the local population. Ancillary business, ranging from restaurants to art shops have been started by local businessmen. These businesses provide secondary employment for local residents.

=== 1997 to 2007 ===
The 1997 Asian financial crisis and the fall of Suharto regime in 1998 marked the beginning a decade of setbacks for tourism. Spurred by rapid devaluation of the currency and the transition to true democracy caused all of Indonesia to experience a period of domestic unrest. Many of Indonesian Provinces struggled with elements of the population desiring autonomy or independence from the Republic of Indonesia. At the same time, fanatical Islamic terrorism in Indonesia further aggravated domestic unrest across the archipelago.

In January 2000, radical Islamic agitators from the newly formed Jemaah Islamiyah provoked religious and ethnic violence in the Ampenan area of Mataram and the southern area of Senggigi. Many foreign expatriates and tourists were temporarily evacuated to Bali. Numerous foreign embassies issued Travel Warnings advising of the potential danger of traveling to Indonesia.

Subsequently, the 2002 Bali bombings, the 2005 Bali bombings and the Progress of the SARS outbreak in Asia all dramatically impacted tourism activities in Lombok. Tourism was slow to return to Lombok, provoked in part by a worldwide reluctance to travel because of global tensions. Only since 2007–2008, when most developed countries lifted their Travel Warnings has tourism recovered to pre-2000 levels.

=== Present ===
The years leading up to 2010 saw a rapid revival and promotion of tourism recovery in the tourism industry. The number of visitors far surpassed pre-2000 levels. The vast majority of tourists come from the Asia-Pacific region, particularly from nearby Australia where it is a popular but quieter alternative to the more traditional tourist destination of Bali.

The Indonesian government has actively promoted both Lombok and neighboring Sumbawa as Indonesia's number two tourist destination after Bali. In 2009, then President of Indonesia, Susilo Bambang Yudhoyono, the Ministry of Cultural and Tourism and the regional Governor made public statements supporting the development of Lombok as a tourism destination and setting a goal of 1 million visitors annually by the year 2012 for the combined destination of Lombok and Sumbawa. This has seen infrastructure improvements to the island including road upgrades and the construction of a much delayed new International airport in the islands south. Bali Tourism Development Corporation (BTDC) has been empowered to develop Mandalika Resort Area at southern part of the island, extending from Kuta along 8 kilometres (5.0 mi) of sandy beach.

Tourism is an important source of income on Lombok. The most developed tourism area of the island is on the west coast of the island and is centered about the township of Senggigi. The immediate surrounds of the township contain the most developed tourism facilities. The west coast coastal tourism strip is spread along a 30 kilometres (19 miles) strip following the coastal road north from Mataram and the old airport at Ampenan. The principal tourism area extends to Tanjung in the northwest at the foot of Mount Rinjani and includes the Sire and Medana Peninsulas and the highly popular Gili Islands lying immediately offshore. These three small islands are most commonly accessed by boat from Bangsal near Pemenang, Teluk Nare a little to the south, or from further south at Senggigi and Mangsit beach. Many hotels and resorts offer accommodations ranging from budget to luxurious. Recently direct fast boat services have been running from Bali making a direct connection to the Gili islands. Although rapidly changing in character, the Gili islands still provide both a lay-back backpacker's retreat and a high-class resort destination.

Other tourist destinations include Mount Rinjani, Gili Bidara, Gili Lawang, Narmada Park and Mayura Park and Kuta (distinctly different from Kuta, Bali). Sekotong, in southwest Lombok, is popular for its numerous and diverse scuba diving locations.

The Kuta area has largely deserted, white sand beaches. The area is developing since the opening of the international airport in Praya. Surfers visit the area for its surf and what they describe as the slow and rustic feel of Lombok. South Lombok surfing is considered by some to be among the best in the world. Large polar lows push up through the Indian Ocean directing long range, high period swell from as far south as Heard Island from late March through to September or later. This coincides with the dry season and South-East trade winds. Lombok has a diversity of breaks, which includes Desert Point at Banko Banko in the southwest of the island.

The northern west coast near Tanjung has many new upmarket hotel and villa developments centered about the Sire and Medana peninsular nearby to the Gili islands and a new boating marina at Medana Bay. These new developments complement the already existing five-star resorts and a large golf course already established there.

The Mandalika International Street Circuit opened in 2021 and has hosted the Indonesian motorcycle Grand Prix (a round of Grand Prix motorcycle racing) Superbike World Championship and GT World Challenge Asia.

=== Halal tourism ===
In 2019, Lombok received a score of 70, the highest among the assessed top 10 halal tourist destinations in Indonesia in study conducted by the Tourism Ministry. The Indonesian Government was hoping to attract some of the anticipated 230 million Muslim travellers across the world in 2026, with potential spending of up to US$300 billion.

According to the Organisation of Islamic Cooperation, halal (or Islamic) tourism components are halal hotels (no alcohol, gambling, etc.; Quran, prayer mats and arrows indicating the direction of Mecca in every room), halal transport (cleanliness; non-alcoholic drinks; publications coherent with Islam), halal food premises, halal (Islamic-themed) tour packages and halal finance (the financial resources of the hotel, restaurant, travel agency and the airlines have to fit with Islamic principles).

== Transport ==
Lombok International Airport (Bandara Internasional Lombok) (IATA: LOP, ICAO: WADL) is south west of the small regional city of Praya in South central Lombok. It commenced operations on 1 October 2011. It replaced Selaparang airport near Ampenan. It is the only operational international airport within the province of West Nusa Tenggara (Nusa Tenggara Barat).

Selaparang Airport in Ampenan was closed for operations on the evening of 30 September 2011. It previously provided facilities for domestic services to Java, Bali, and Sumbawa and international services to Singapore to Kuala Lumpur via Surabaya and Jakarta. It was the island's original airport and is situated on Jalan Adi Sucipto on the north western outskirts of Mataram. The terminals and basic airport infrastructure remain intact but it is closed to all civil airline traffic.

Lembar Harbor seaport in the southwest has shipping facilities and a ferry for road vehicles and passenger services. In 2013, the gross tonnage is 4.3 million Gross Tonnages or increase by 72 percent from 2012 data means in Lombok and West Nusa Tenggara the economy progress significantly.

Labuhan Lombok ferry port on the east coast provides a ferry for road vehicles and passenger services to Poto Tano on Sumbawa.

=== Transport between Bali and Lombok ===
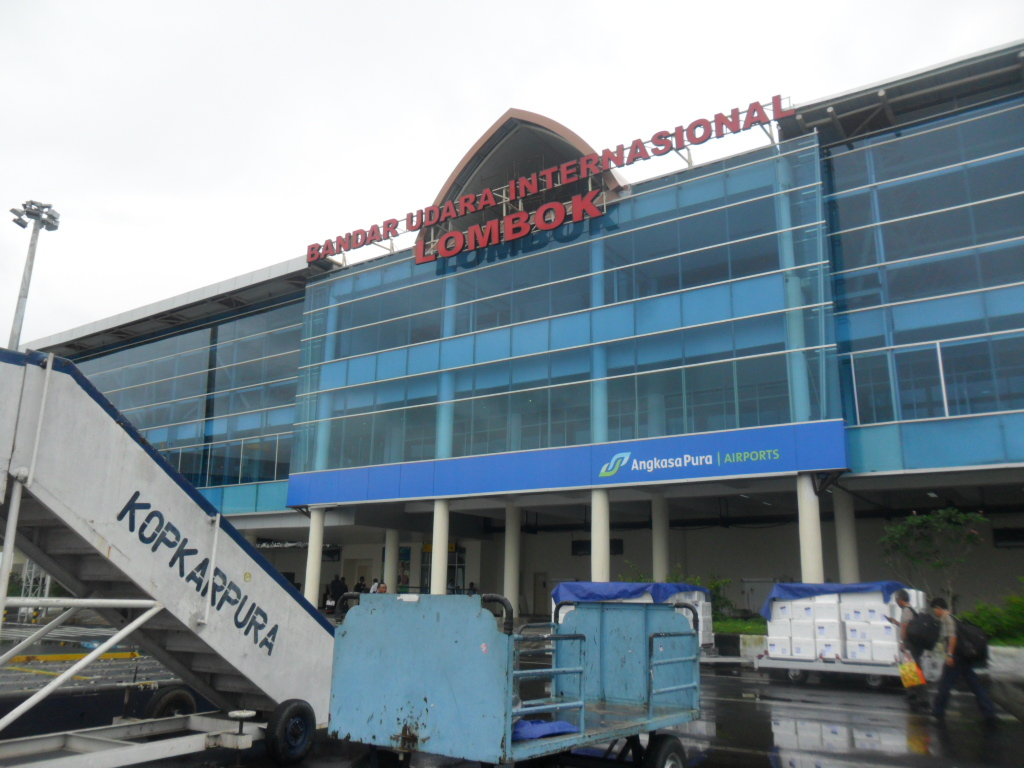
Lombok "Zainuddin Abdul Madjid International" Airport

Flights from Ngurah Rai International Airport (IATA: DPS) to Lombok "Zainuddin Abdul Madjid" International Airport (IATA: LOP) take about 40 minutes. Lombok International Airport is located in southwest Lombok, 1.5 hours drive to Senggigi main tourist areas in the west Lombok, 2 hours drive to the jetty of Teluk Nara before you cross to Gili Islands and about 30 minutes drive to Kuta south Lombok.

Public ferries depart from Padang Bai (Southeast Bali) and Lembar (Southwest Lombok) every hour, taking a minimum of 4–5 hours to make the crossing in either direction.

Fast boat services are available from various departure points on Bali and principally serve the Gili Islands, with some significant onward traffic to the Lombok mainland. Arrival points on Lombok are dependent upon the operator, at either Teluk Nare/Teluk Kodek, Bangsal harbour or the township of Senggigi, all on the northwest coast. Operating standards vary widely.

== Festivals ==
A traditional event called Bau Nyale (meaning "to catch the sea worms), is held between February and March. The event focuses on catching the spawning parts of Palola viridis, which are known as nyale or wawo. In local legend, nyale are believed to be the reincarnation of the beautiful Princess Mandalika, who had jumped into the sea to drown herself off Seger beach, after her father had set up a contest for potential suitors to fight one another to win her hand in marriage.
