= Najmul Akhyar =

Indonesian politician (born 1972)

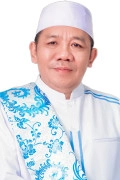
- 2024 ballot photo

Regent of North Lombok
- Incumbent
- Assumed office 20 February 2025
- Preceded by: Djohan Sjamsu
- In office 17 February 2016 – 17 February 2021
- Preceded by: Djohan Sjamsu
- Succeeded by: Djohan Sjamsu

Vice Regent of North Lombok
- In office 2010–2015
- Regent: Djohan Sjamsu
- Preceded by: Position created
- Succeeded by: Sarifudin

Personal details
- Born: 14 June 1972 (age 53) West Lombok, West Nusa Tenggara, Indonesia

Najmul Akhyar (born 14 June 1972) is an Indonesian politician of the Perindo Party and lawyer who is the regent of North Lombok Regency, serving since February 2025 after previously serving a term between 2016 and 2021. His first term saw the 2018 Lombok earthquakes devastate the regency. He had previously been vice-regent in 2010–2015, and before that a municipal legislator in West Lombok Regency in 1999–2009, during which he was part of a committee for North Lombok's secession.

== Early life ==
Najmul Akhyar was born on 14 June 1972 in the village of Menggala, in Pemenang district of West Lombok Regency (today in North Lombok). He was the third of six children between Fuad Muhtar and Asiah. Fuad was a local religious leader and a member of West Lombok's Regional House of Representatives (DPRD). Najmul completed elementary school at Menggala in 1985, before completing middle school and high school in East Lombok. He then studied law at the University of Mataram, graduating in 1997. He later also received a master's degree at Udayana University in 2004 and a doctorate from Brawijaya University in 2014.

== Career ==
Before his regency, Najmul practised law and was a lecturer at the University of Mataram, though he resigned in 2009 when a new regulation prohibited state university employees from running for political office before resigning.

In the 1999 legislative election, Najmul was elected as a member of West Lombok Regency's Regional House of Representatives. He was reelected for a second term in 2004, both terms as a United Development Party (PPP) member. West Lombok's regent Iskandar formed a committee in 2005 to assess the splitting off of the northern districts of the regency to form the North Lombok Regency, and Najmul became its vice-chair. The splitting was approved in 2008, and in 2010 Najmul ran in North Lombok's first regency election as the running mate of Djohan Sjamsu, who had chaired the committee. They were elected with 45.2 per cent of votes. During his time as vice-regent, he moved to the Prosperous Justice Party, and later to Demokrat.

=== Regent ===
In 2015, Najmul opted to run as regent against Djohan Sjamsu, receiving backing from the political parties PDI-P, Gerindra, PAN, PKB, and PBB. He defeated Djohan in the election with 68,335 votes (53.5%). He was sworn in as regent on 17 February 2016, with Sarifudin becoming his vice regent.

During his tenure, a series of earthquakes struck North Lombok, killing hundreds of people, and causing widespread damage with tens of thousand of houses damaged and over 100,000 people displaced. In statements to media, Najmul estimated that 80 per cent of the regency was damaged and requested heavy equipment support to rescue trapped survivors in collapsed mosques. During the following months, thousands of displaced residents of North Lombok protested over perceived slowness in reconstruction and the indirect aid mechanism passing through community groups. Speaking with protestors, Najmul stated that the community groups were a requirement by central government agencies distributing the funds. As his office was damaged by the earthquake, Najmul set up an office in a converted shipping container for a time after the earthquake. One year after the earthquake, Najmul stated that 40 per cent of classrooms were still damaged and 55 thousand out of 75 thousand damaged homes had not been repaired.

Najmul faced Djohan Sjamsu again in the 2020 regency election, and was defeated, with Djohan winning 83,659 votes (56.1%) to Najmul's 65,378 (43.9%). Najmul moved to the Perindo Party in 2022. He ran again in the 2024 regency election with Djohan Sjamsu's son Kusmalahadi Syamsuri as running mate, and the pair won the three-way election with 67,323 votes (45.2%). He was sworn in for his second term on 20 February 2025. In his second term, he began the process of splitting off the Gili Islands into their own district.

== Personal life ==
He is married to Rohani, who in the 2024 legislative election was elected as a Perindo member to the West Nusa Tenggara Regional House of Representatives.
