= 2024 North Lombok regency election =

Local election in Indonesia

- 27 November 2024
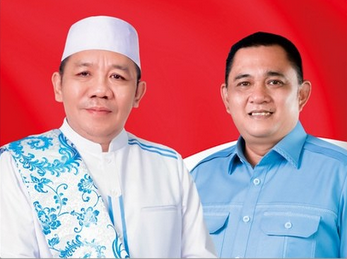

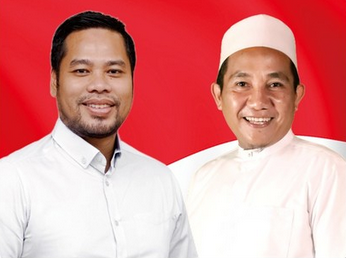

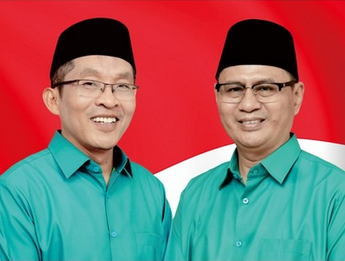
Candidate	Najmul Akhyar	Danny K. Febrianto	Lalu Muchsin Effendi
Party	Perindo	Independent	PKB
Running mate	Kusmalahadi Syamsuri	Zaki Abdillah	Junaidi Arif
Popular vote	67,323	49,621	32,071
Percentage	45.18%	33.30%	21.52%
Regent before election
Djohan Sjamsu
Gerindra
Elected Regent
Najmul Akhyar
Perindo

The 2024 North Lombok regency election was held on 27 November 2024 as part of nationwide local elections to elect the regent of North Lombok Regency, West Nusa Tenggara for a five-year term. With incumbent regent Djohan Sjamsu being ineligible to contest the election, 2016–2021 regent Najmul Akhyar managed to defeat incumbent vice regent Danny Karter Febrianto and PKB candidate Lalu Muchsin Effendi to secure a second term.

== Electoral system ==
The election, like other local elections in 2024, follow the first-past-the-post system where the candidate with the most votes wins the election, even if they do not win a majority. It is possible for a candidate to run uncontested, in which case the candidate is still required to win a majority of votes "against" an "empty box" option. Should the candidate fail to do so, the election will be repeated on a later date.

The North Lombok General Elections Commission announced on 19 September 2024 that there would be 185,460 voters eligible to vote in the election.

== Candidates ==
Incumbent regent Djohan Sjamsu had served two full terms as regent, and was ineligible to contest the election. To qualify for the election, candidates were required to secure support from a political party or a coalition of parties controlling 10% percent of the valid votes during the 2024 legislative election. Candidates may alternatively run without party backing by submitting proofs of support in form of copies of identity cards, but no such candidates registered in North Lombok.

=== Najmul-Syamsuri ===
Najmul Akhyar, a member of Perindo and part of its national central leadership who had served as North Lombok's regent in 2015–2020, received his party's endorsement in June 2024. As running mate, Akhyar had selected Kusmalahadi Syamsuri, son of Djohan Sjamsu. By July, the ticket had secured further endorsements from the Democratic Party and the United Development Party, and by August Gerindra and Golkar had also endorsed the pair. Djohan Sjamsu, previously in the National Awakening Party, moved to Gerindra due to his support for Najmul and Syamsuri.

=== Danny-Zaki ===
Incumbent vice regent Denny Karter Febrianto, initially chairman of North Lombok's Gerindra branch, initially received his party's support to run as regent. However, by August, the party's central leadership opted to back the Najmul-Syamsuri ticket. As Febrianto refused to cancel his bid, he was fired from his chairmanship of the party, although he remained a party member. He instead ran with the backing of the PDI-P, PKS, and Nasdem, with Zaki Abdillah as his running mate.

=== Muchsin-Junaidi ===
The National Awakening Party (PKB)'s national leadership in June 2024 appointed Lalu Muchsin Effendi, despite resistance from Djohan Sjamsu (incumbent PKB chairman) who supported his son's ticket with Najmul Akhyar. As his running mate was Junaidi Arif, chairman of the provincial branch of the Crescent Star Party. The pair also received endorsements from the National Mandate Party and the Nusantara Awakening Party.

== Campaign ==
Two rounds of public debates between the candidates were organized by KPU and were held on 30 October and 13 November 2024.

== Results ==
Candidate	Running mate	Candidate party	Votes	%
Najmul Akhyar	Kusmalahadi Syamsuri	Perindo	67,323	45.18
Danny K. Febrianto	Zaki Abdillah	Independent	49,621	33.30
Lalu Muchsin Effendi	Junaidi Arif	National Awakening Party	32,071	21.52
Total			149,015	100.00
Registered voters/turnout			185,460	–
