= Gili Islands =

Three small islands off Lombok, Indonesia

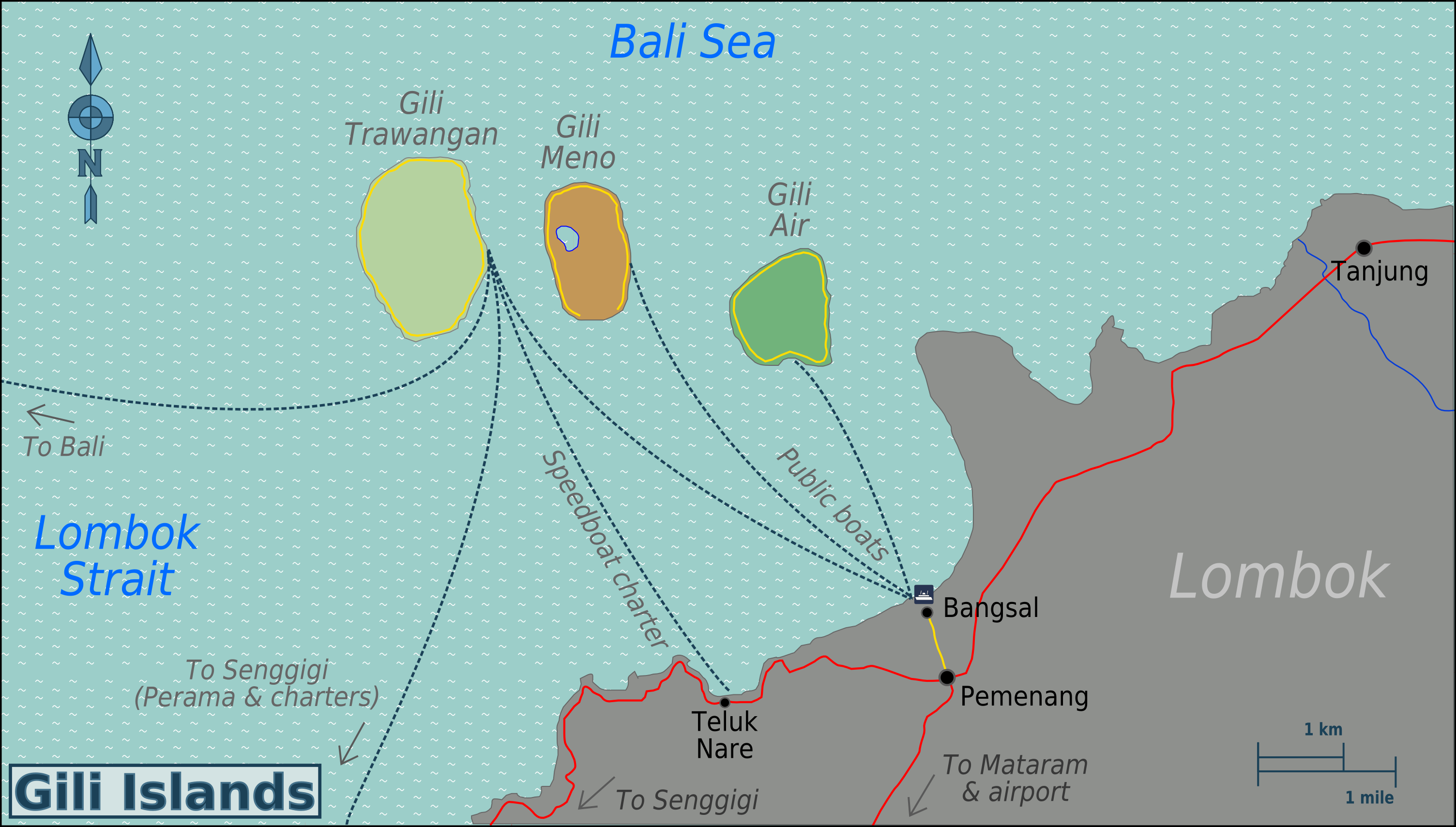
- The Gili Islands, northwest of Lombok

Geography
- Location: South East Asia
- Coordinates: 8.35°S 116.06°E
- Archipelago: Lesser Sunda Islands
- Total islands: 3
- Major islands: Trawangan, Meno, Air
- Area: 6.78 km^{2} (2.62 sq mi)
- Highest elevation: 60 m (200 ft)

Administration
- Indonesia
- Province: West Nusa Tenggara
- Province: North Lombok Regency

Demographics
- Population: 5,077 estimated permanent inhabitants (mid 2022 estimate)
- Pop. density: 748.8/km^{2} (1939.4/sq mi)
- Ethnic groups: Sasak, Balinese, Tionghoa-peranakan, Sumbawa people, Flores people, Arab Indonesian

The Gili Islands (Indonesian: Tiga Gili ('Three Gilis'), Kepulauan Gili ('Gili Islands') are an archipelago of three small islands or Gili island triplets — Gili Trawangan, Gili Meno and Gili Air — just off the northwest coast of Lombok, Indonesia. The local name of these three islands is Gili Indah which means "small beautiful islands". They were previously administered under West Lombok Regency along with Senggigi until 2010 when the Gili islands came under the jurisdiction of the new North Lombok Regency (Kabupaten Lombok Utara); together they form an administrative village (desa) within the Pemenang District (kecamatan) of North Lombok Regency.

The islands are a tourist destination. Each island has several resorts, usually consisting of a collection of huts for tourists, a small pool and restaurant. The largest Indonesian settlement is located on Gili Air, however due to the amount of western expatriates who live on Trawangan together with the locals, it has become the more densely populated island, concentrated in a township stretching along its east side (this is also where the majority of tourist development has taken place). Automobiles and motorized traffic are prohibited on the islands by local ordinance, so the preferred method of transportation is by foot and bicycle or the horse-drawn carriage called a cidomo. Scuba diving and free diving in and around the Gilis is also common due to the abundance of marine life and coral formations. Most famous diving spots are Shark point, Manta point and Simon's reef.

== Etymology ==
The name "Gili Islands" is somewhat tautological, because Gili simply means "small island" in Sasak. Most of the small islands around the coast of Lombok have Gili in their names, and to avoid confusion with the three islands of the Gili Islands, the other Gilis around the Lombok coast should be referred to in English by their full proper names.

The Indonesian word for water is Air ([aˈjɛr]) and Gili Air was so-named as it is the only island of the three to have subterranean fresh water. Since this fresh water is a finite resource on the island, some resorts and restaurants in the island ship in water from the mainland.

== Geography and climate ==
The Islands are located in the Lombok Strait, to the immediate northwest of Lombok. They extend outward from a tiny peninsula called Sire near to the village of Tanjung on Lombok. Bali lies about 35 km to the west of Gili Trawangan, the islands' most westerly member. Both Bali and Lombok are easily visible from the Gilis in clear weather. Mount Rinjani, Indonesia's second highest volcano, is close by on neighbouring Lombok, and dominates the views towards the east.

Due to their close proximity to the Equator, the Islands have a warm, tropical climate with a dry and wet season. With Mount Rinjani to the immediate east on Lombok, and Mount Agung to the west on Bali, the Gilis are somewhat sheltered and actually enjoy a slightly drier microclimate when compared to the surrounding archipelago. Dry Season usually lasts from May until October, with monsoon season starting in November and continuing through to April. Temperatures range between 22 °C to 34 °C, with an average annual temperature of around 28 °C.

== History ==
Due to their small size and population, and relatively recent settlement of the islands, published sources are limited. Where local knowledge has been used, those cited are elected local officials whose details are listed in the references section. For more detailed regional historical information, visit the Lombok article.

For a brief period during the Second World War, occupying Japanese forces used the islands as a lookout post and prisoner of war camp. Relics from this period include the remains of a bunker on the hill of Gili Trawangan, and the wreck of a patrol boat submerged at a depth of 45 m in the bay to the south of Gili Air (now a popular dive site). Permanent settlement only began in the 1970s, mainly due to the lack of fresh water sources before that time. Prior to human settlement, these islands remained pristine wildlife mangrove habitats.

Initially, Bugis fishermen used the islands as a stop off location for their voyages around the archipelago. In 1971 the governor of Lombok, Wasita Kusama, began to establish coconut plantations and gave land rights to private companies. Some 350 inmates from the overcrowded prison in Lombok's largest city Mataram, were sent to help with the first harvests between 1974 and 1979; many of the inmates remained on the islands as permanent settlers. Following various difficulties with coconut harvests, the private efforts to exploit the islands' plantations were abandoned. The local population grew beyond their allocated bounds (100 hectares) and began to erect homes and businesses on the private, abandoned land. This led to a land dispute that continues to the present.

In the 1980s, the islands started to be discovered by backpacker tourists. This was influenced by the exponential rise of tourism in neighbouring Bali. At first, Gili Air (having the most infrastructure at the time) began to transform to cater to this new economy. However, Gili Trawangan soon surpassed it, due mostly to its proximity to better dive locations.

As the prospects for tourism on the islands began to rise in the late 1980s and early ‘90s, the government and investors whose abandoned land had been settled on by an expanding population, began to regain interest in the potential for development. This resulted in a series of evictions and demolishing of local homes and businesses, followed each time by inaction on the part of the developers and the rebuilding of destroyed homes by residents who opposed the eviction.

The first tourist accommodation on Gili Trawangan was a small homestay called Pak Majid, built in 1982, by Pak ("polite Mr") Majid. This was eventually taken over in 2007 and transformed into Pesona Resort and Restaurant (the first Indian restaurant on the Gilis). Most of the locally owned businesses from the 1980s have been acquired by westerners. The longest standing locally owned and operated business is "Goodheart" resort, originally built in 1987 and rebuilt three times following demolition relating to the ongoing land dispute.

Gili Trawangan gained a reputation from the late 1980s to the late 1990s as a party island. Drugs were freely available on the island and its low population and remoteness required no police presence at the time.

During the 1990s, the diving industry grew swiftly and the islands began to develop into a world class diving instruction location. This fed local tourism and in the new millennium a wider spectrum of accommodation and entertainment began to be developed that catered to a broader range of visitors.

In 2000, a non-profit organisation by the name of Gili Eco Trust was established to help protect the coral reefs surrounding the islands and improve environmental education. It originated as a co-operative venture between influential members of the local community (Satgas) and the dive shops on Gili Trawangan; and was initiated by the owners of Manta Dive. Many projects have since been organised to protect and restore coral reefs, improve waste management, struggle against erosion, treat animals, raise awareness and educate. This was needed as damage had occurred due to a particularly warm El Niño and unsustainable local fishing methods.

In 2005, fast boat operations began from neighbouring Bali. Since then, many other fast boat services have come and gone, from various points around Bali and Nusa Lembongan, to the islands.

As of 2012, the islands continue to experience rapid growth and development related to the tourism industry. Efforts are being made to preserve marine habitats and remain culturally distinct from neighbouring Bali in this process. The aforementioned land dispute remains unresolved.

== Gili Trawangan ==
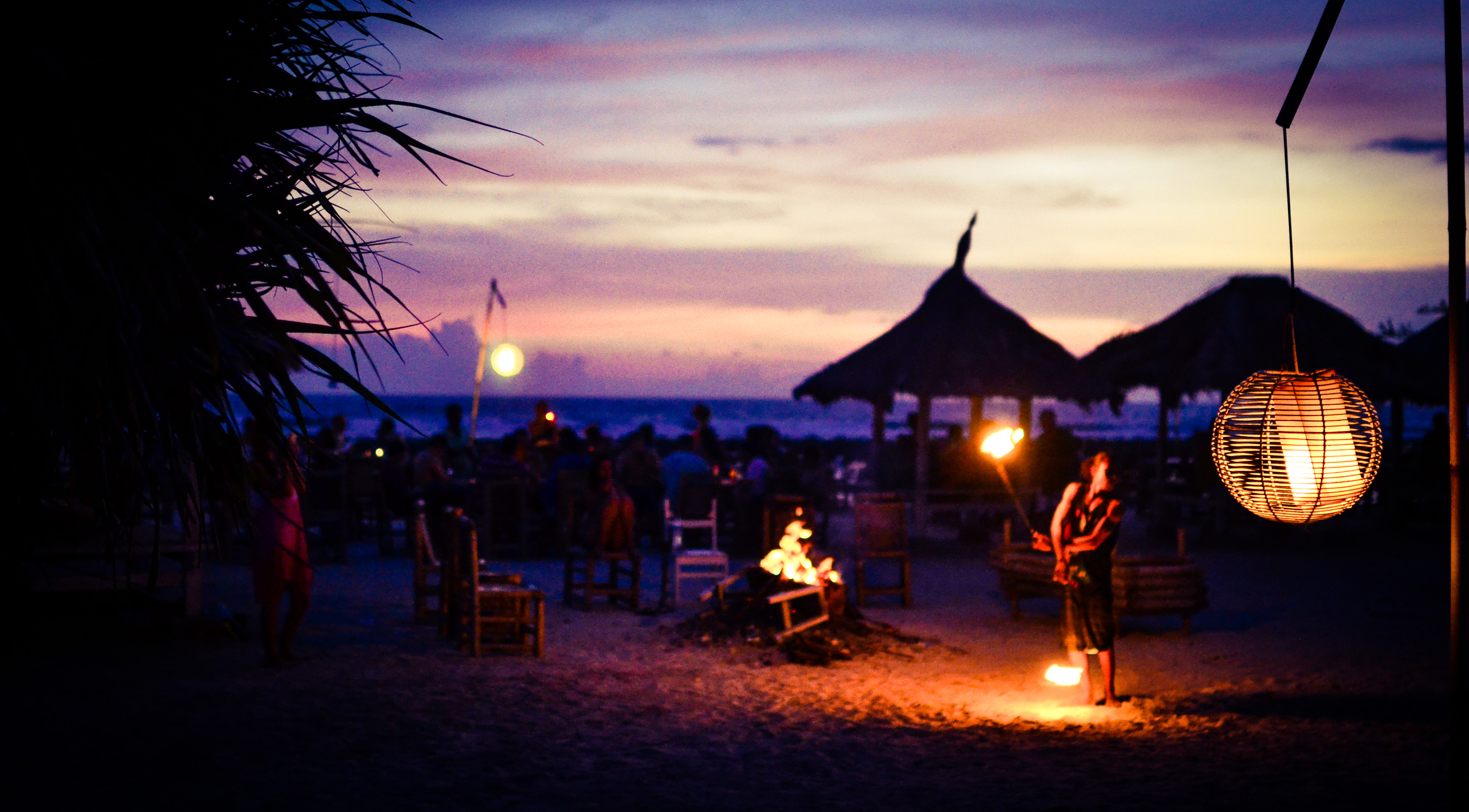
Sunset, Gili Trawangan

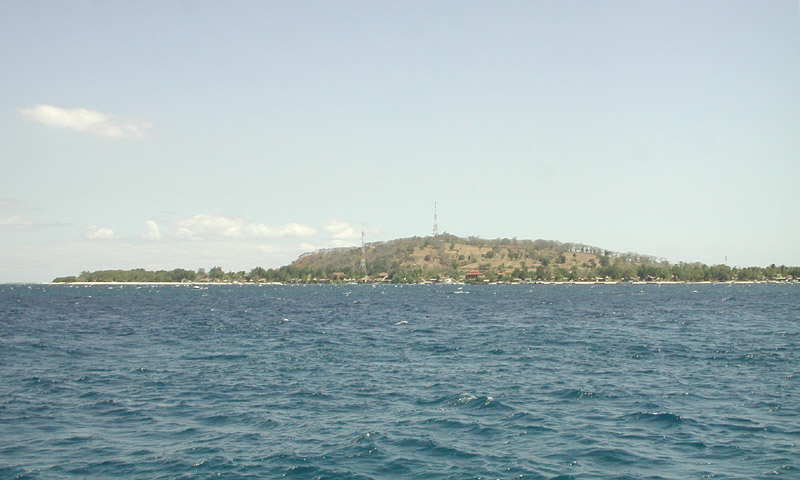
Gili Trawangan as seen from Gili Meno

Gili Trawangan, or colloquially Gili T, is the largest of Lombok's Gili Islands and the only one to rise significantly (30 m) above sea level. Measuring 3 km long and 2 km wide, it has a population of around 1500 (see demography). The name Trawangan originates from the Indonesian word terowongan ("tunnel") due to the presence of a cave tunnel built there during Japanese occupation in World War 2. Japanese presence during the second world war was on elevated topography in the South of the island, where anti-aircraft guns were housed. Only the base of the AA guns remains at the end of the tunnel.

Of the Gilis, Trawangan is the most developed and geared towards tourism. The main concentration of settlement, recreation, accommodation and diving business is situated on the eastern side of the island. A local pub, Tír na Nóg claims that Trawangan is the smallest island in the world with an Irish pub.

On Gili Trawangan (as well as the other two Gilis), there are no motorised vehicles. The main means of transportation are bicycles (rented by locals to tourists) and cidomo (a small horse-drawn carriage). For travelling to and from each of the Gilis, locals usually use motorised boats and speedboats.

Some of the first inhabitants of Gili Trawangan were fishermen and farmers from Sulawesi.

The economy of Gili Trawangan centres on tourism, as the island is too small to support any broad scale agriculture, and too remote to allow economically viable industry or commerce. There is a mosque and a lighthouse on the island.

On 26 March 2014, Will Goodman set a depth record on a closed circuit mixed gas rebreather with 290 m (950 ft). During the dive all his computers froze. His actual – but unrecorded – depth is estimated to be a shade over 300 m (980 ft). The dive in total took nine hours and 57 minutes.

=== Drug tourism ===
Gili Trawangan has had a reputation since the 1980s as a location where drugs are freely available. Psilocybin mushrooms are openly advertised on the island, and a range of harder drugs have been known to be in circulation. Though police presence is low, Indonesian drug laws are extremely harsh and thus strictly speaking drug possession and use is prohibited and carries potentially grave risk (up to and including the death penalty). Although the 'drug tourism' (and tourism in general) began on Gili Trawangan, in the last 10 years finding drugs on Gili Air and Gili Meno has become very open and easy as well. Especially on Gili Air which has more intense psychedelics being sold openly to tourists for beach parties.

Gili Trawangan is also the only island out of the 3 Gili Islands that has any active law enforcement. This makes it much more difficult for harder drugs (such as cocaine or ecstasy) to be sold, and deters drug dealers from staying there. Gili Meno and Gili Air have no police and any issues need to be dealt with at the police station in Lombok.

=== Overtourism ===
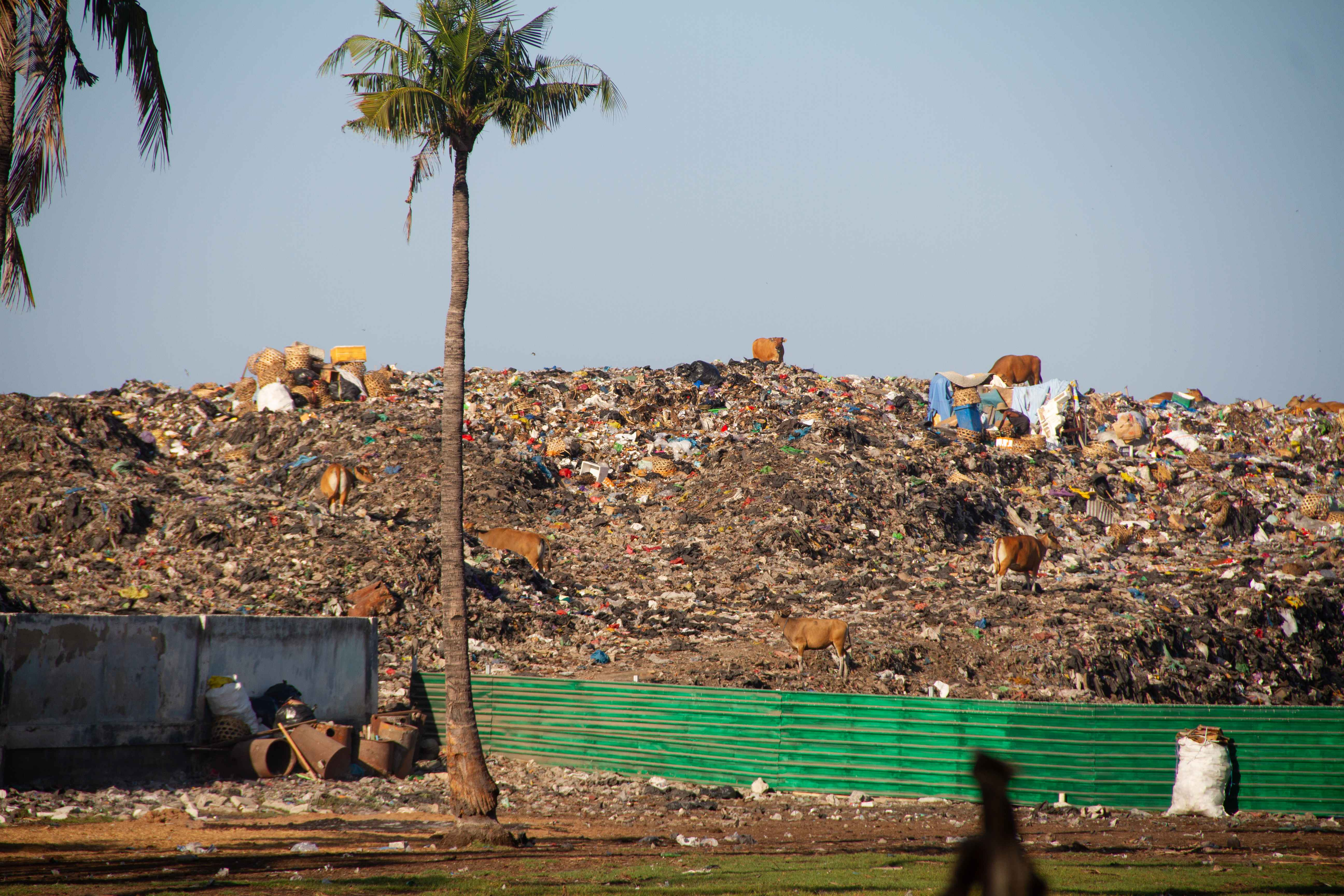
Landfill located in the middle of Gili Trawangan, with bulls on top of it.

Since 2009, the number of tourists visiting Gili Trawangan has doubled each year, from 35,000 to over one million in 2015, overwhelming infrastructure and contributing to the destruction of surrounding coral reefs.

The increase in tourism has also led to an increase in migrant workers, causing issues with waste management. According to Thomas Egli – a photographer who travelled to Gili Trawangan in 2015 to document the overtourism problem – there is a huge rubbish tip in the centre of the island that is kept out of sight of visiting tourists. He also describes overwhelmed septic tanks leading to unfiltered waste entering the sea, unregulated building, and culture clashes between the predominantly-Muslim local population and (mostly) Western tourists.

== Gili Meno ==
Gili Meno is the middle of Lombok's three northwest coast Gilis. Gili Meno has a population of about 500, mainly concentrated on the centre of the island (see section on demography). The main income comes from tourism, coconut plantation and fishing. On the west side of the island there is a small shallow lake that produces salt in the dry season. Until a few years ago, there was also a small production of seaweed on the reef at the north end of the island. Gili Meno has swimming beaches all around the island, and a turtle sanctuary.

Since early 2017, fresh water was installed on the island and is supplied by underwater pipes from Lombok. Electricity is supplied by underwater cables from Lombok.

Gili Meno is the quietest of the three Gili islands. The island features beaches, clear water, and snorkelling locations, including an underwater attraction with a circular arrangement of 48 human statues.

== Gili Air ==
Gili Air is the closest of the islands to Lombok and has a population of about 1,800. It has excellent snorkelling sites and turtles can be seen along the coral reef off its east coast. Water sports such as scuba diving, paddleboarding and kitesurfing are available, along with other activities such as yoga, cooking classes and watching movies at outdoor cinemas on the beach.

The island provides a range of amenities, including various accommodation options, shops, restaurants, beach bars, clinics and ATM's. People get around by walking, using bicycles, or riding the small horse-drawn carriages known as cidomos.

Gili Air is popular with travellers seeking a balance between the party-focused atmosphere of Gili Trawangan and the quiet serenity of Gili Meno.

== Transport ==
There is no motorised transport on the Islands apart from electric scooters. The short distances on land are traversed on foot, by bicycle or Cidomo. The Islands can only be reached by sea, and are frequented by a variety of fast boats operating various routes from Bali and Lombok.

- There are direct boat services from Bali and Lombok to the Gili Islands.
- Flights from Ngurah Rai International Airport (IATA: DPS) to Lombok International Airport (IATA: LOP) take about 40 minutes followed by a 2 h taxi ride to Bangsal harbour in Northwest Lombok and a Local boat to the Gili Islands for a further 20-30mins.
- Public Ferries depart from Padang Bai (Southeast Bali) every hour, taking a minimum of 4–5 hours to reach Lembar (Southwest Lombok), after which a taxi can be taken for a 2 h drive to Bangsal harbour where local boats to the Gili Islands await during daylight hours.
- Fast boats depart daily from Padang Bai (Southeast Bali), Serangan (South Bali) and Amed (North East Bali) with an average crossing time between 1.5 and 2.5 hours.

== Earthquake disaster ==
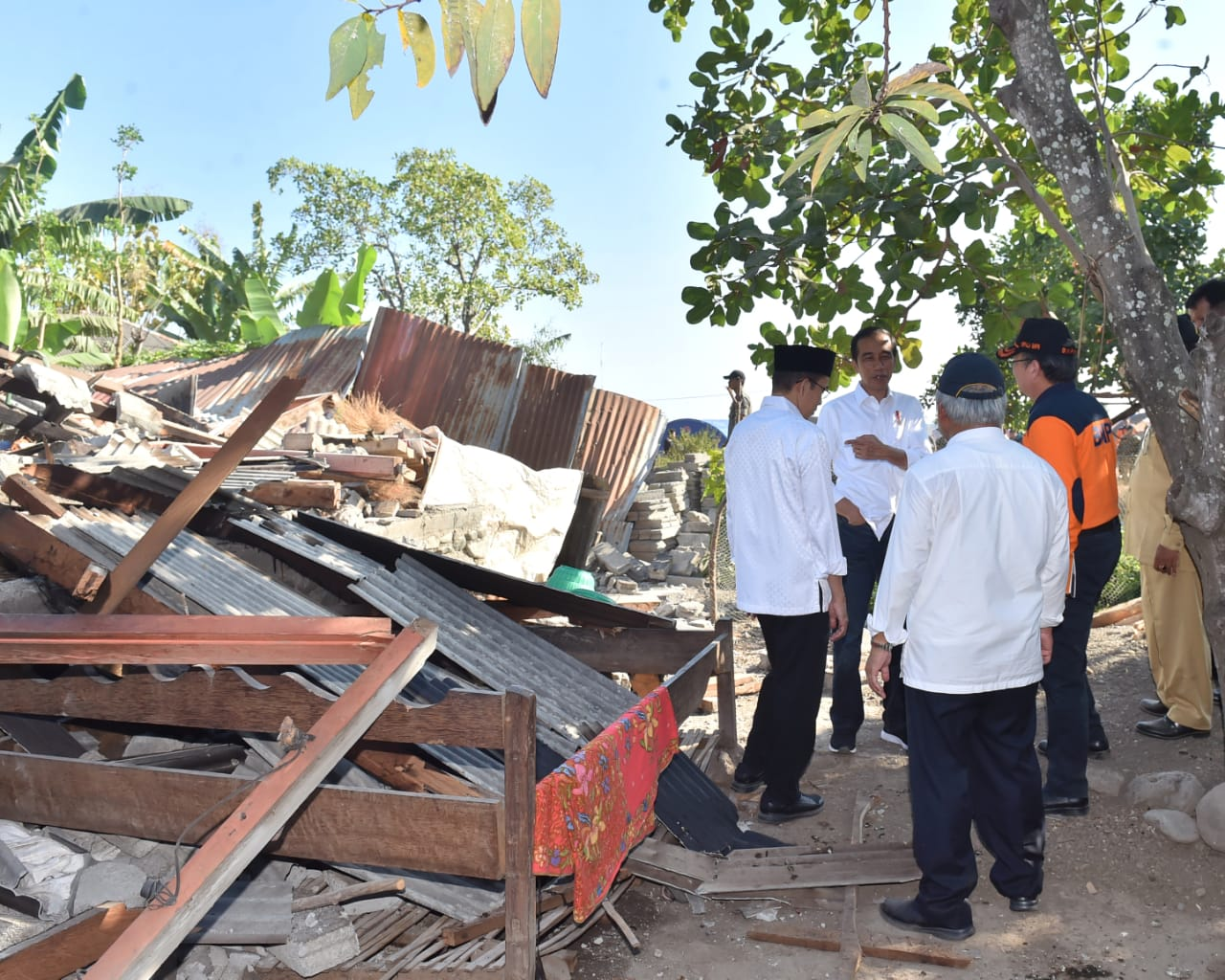
Joko Widodo examining the earthquake damage.

The August 2018 Lombok earthquake killed 20 people and injured hundreds more, the earthquake caused significant damage to Lombok island and was the foreshock of a larger earthquake that followed 8 days later. The August 2018 Lombok earthquake occurred on August 5, 2018, and had a moment magnitude of 6.9 and caused catastrophic damage to North Lombok and also caused damage to nearby Bali, The earthquake caused up to 563 deaths and injured hundreds more.

The Gili Islands escaped the worst of the damage, which was mostly concentrated in the North of Lombok, however there was significant structural damage to property on the islands causing debris and wounding many. Many of the tourism businesses on the Gili Islands had commuting employees, living in Lombok, who were severely affected, losing family members, homes and more. Once the dust had settled, it took a while for the Indonesian Government to prepare and send aid. The Indonesian National Board for Disaster Management refused international aid, claiming "earthquakes did not constitute a national emergency" and that they were capable enough to respond without help. However, the infrastructure for disaster management and relief was not adequately in place in and around Lombok, resulting in acute delays during the aftermath. Therefore, the first responders to the disaster were stretched local government agencies such as police & military personnel, domestic volunteers and business owners in the Gili islands and the parts of Lombok that were less affected by the quakes. These organised small scale international fundraising initiatives through social networks and the web to help source & acquire much needed basic resources such as food & clean water, and shortly thereafter begin assisting with temporary and permanent shelter. This was vital in the early stages of the disaster, before larger scale government assistance arrived.

== Gallery ==
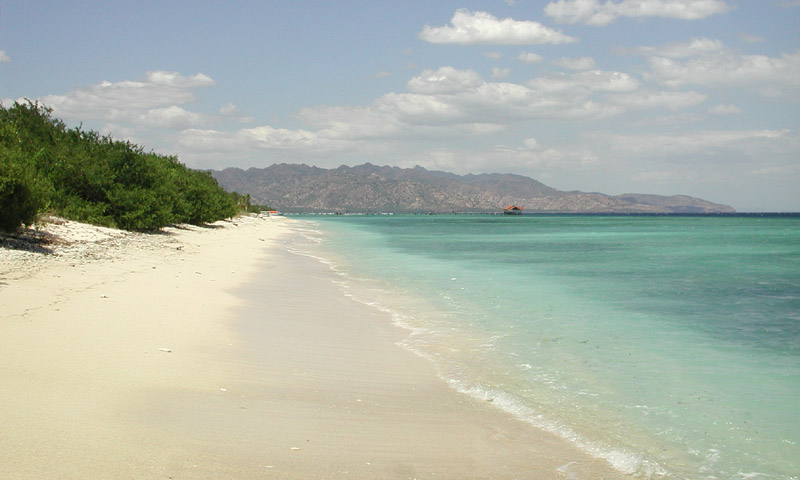
View of the west coast of Gili Meno looking south — Lombok is in the distance

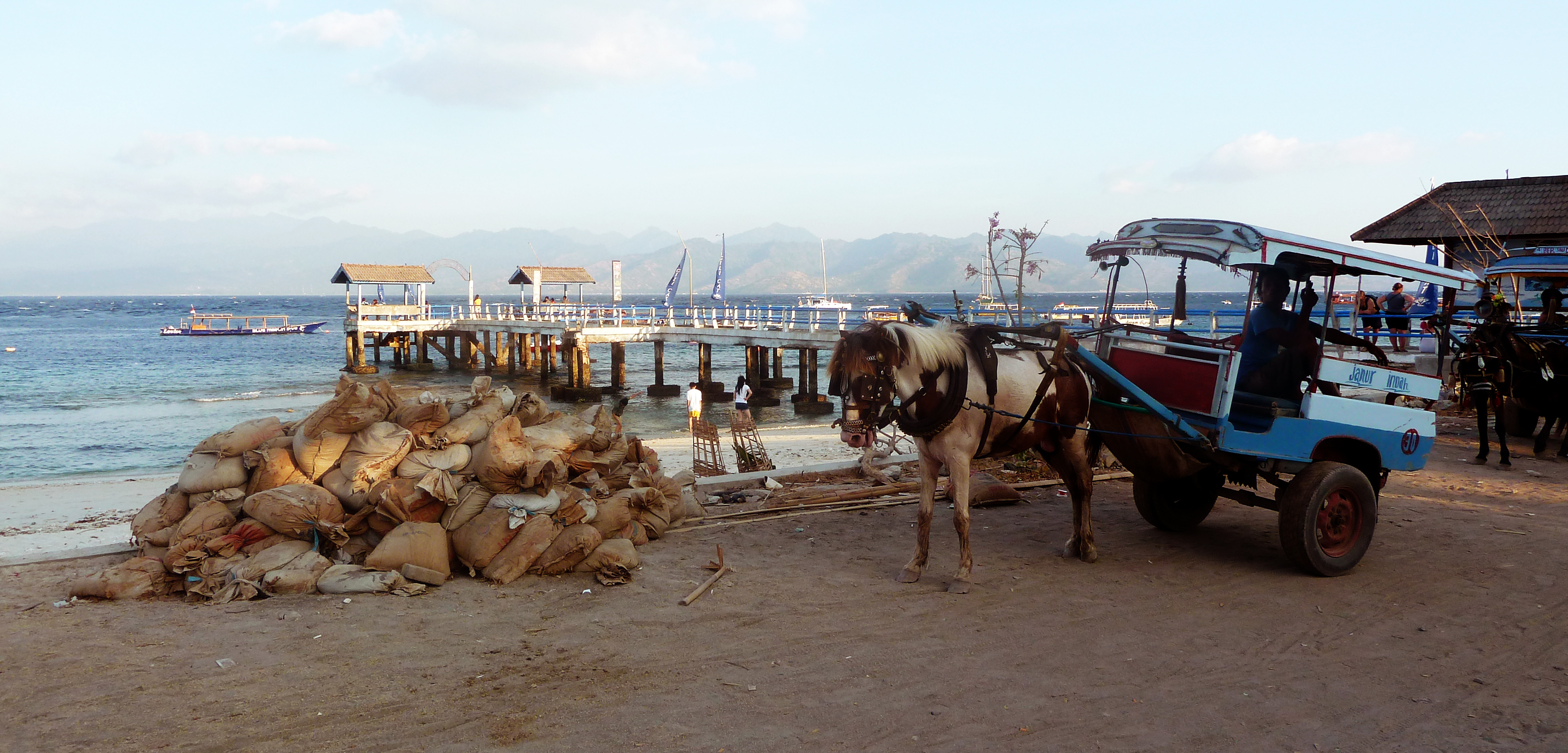
View of Trawangan Pier and a Cidomo, local transport

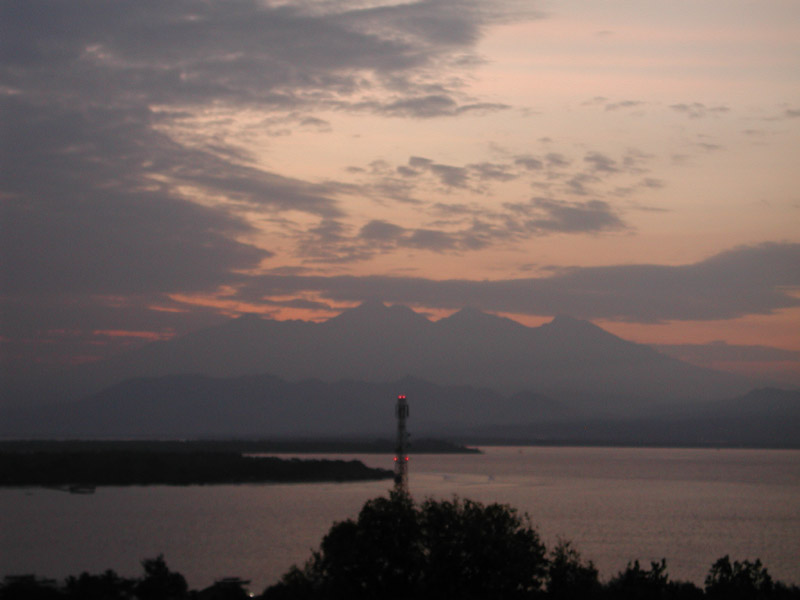
View from the top of the hill on Gili Trawangan just after dawn; foreground is Gili Trawangan, Gili Meno is next and then Gili Air — Gunung Rinjani is backlit by the approaching dawn

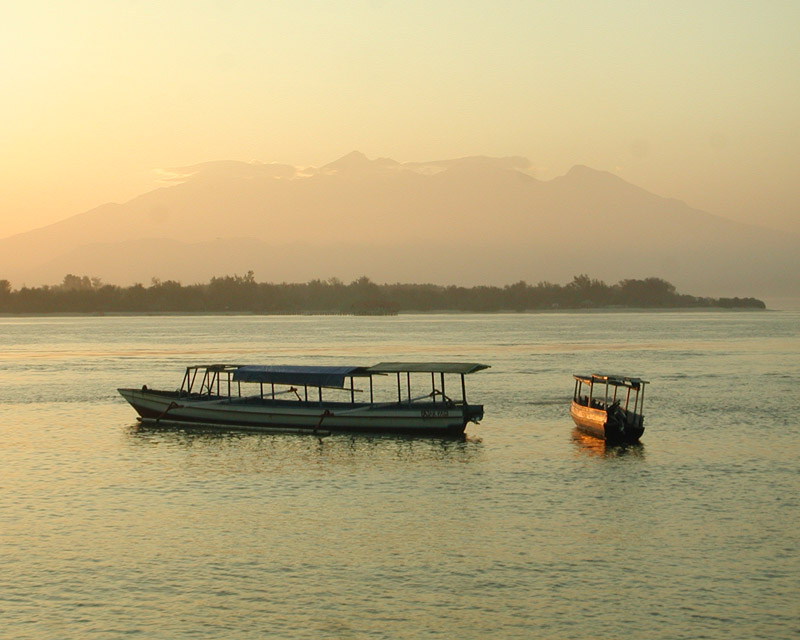
View from Gili Trawangan; in the foreground are island hopper boats anchored off Gili Trawangan, Gili Meno is the next island — Ginung Rinjani is in the distance

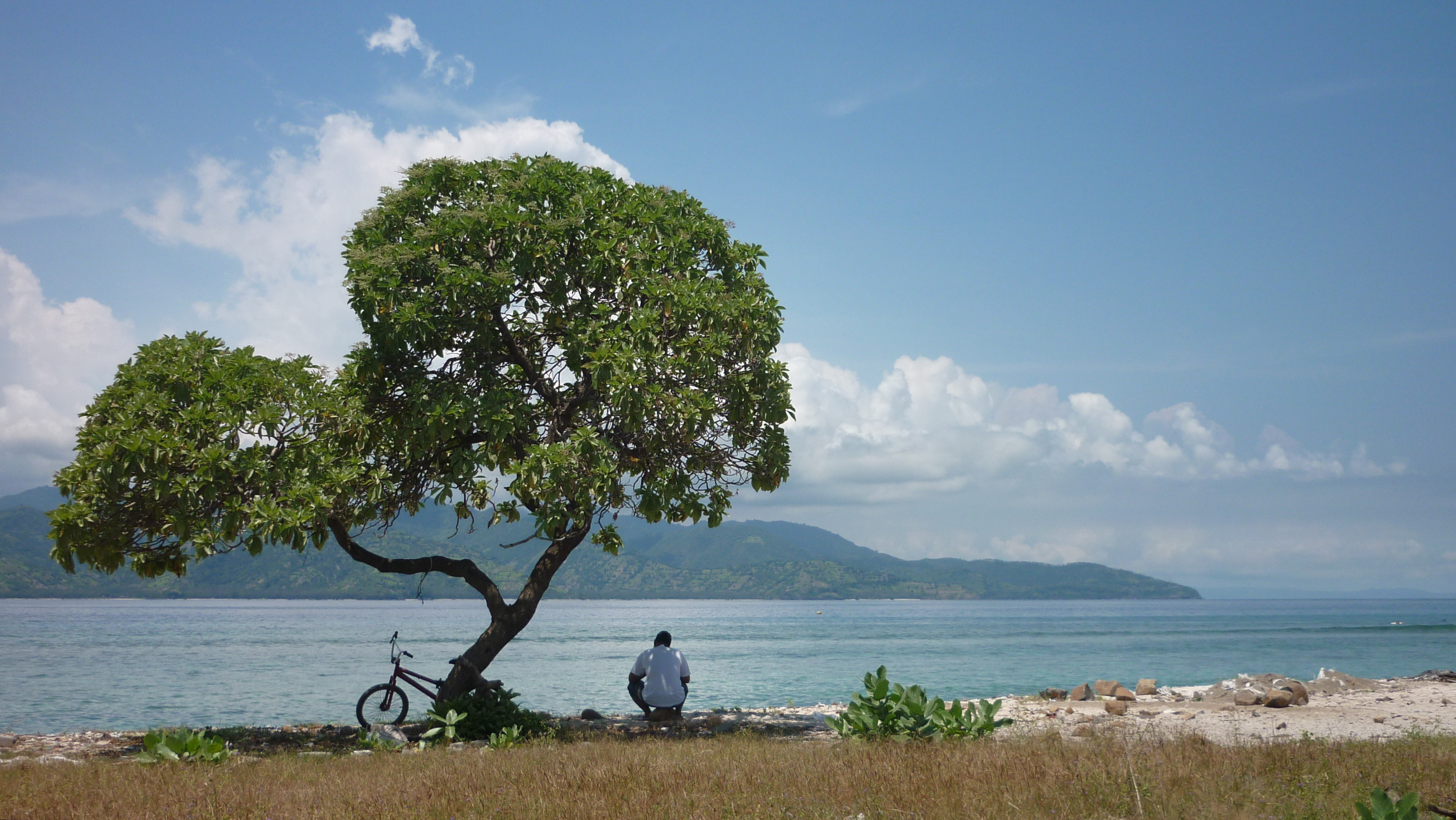
Gili Trawangan

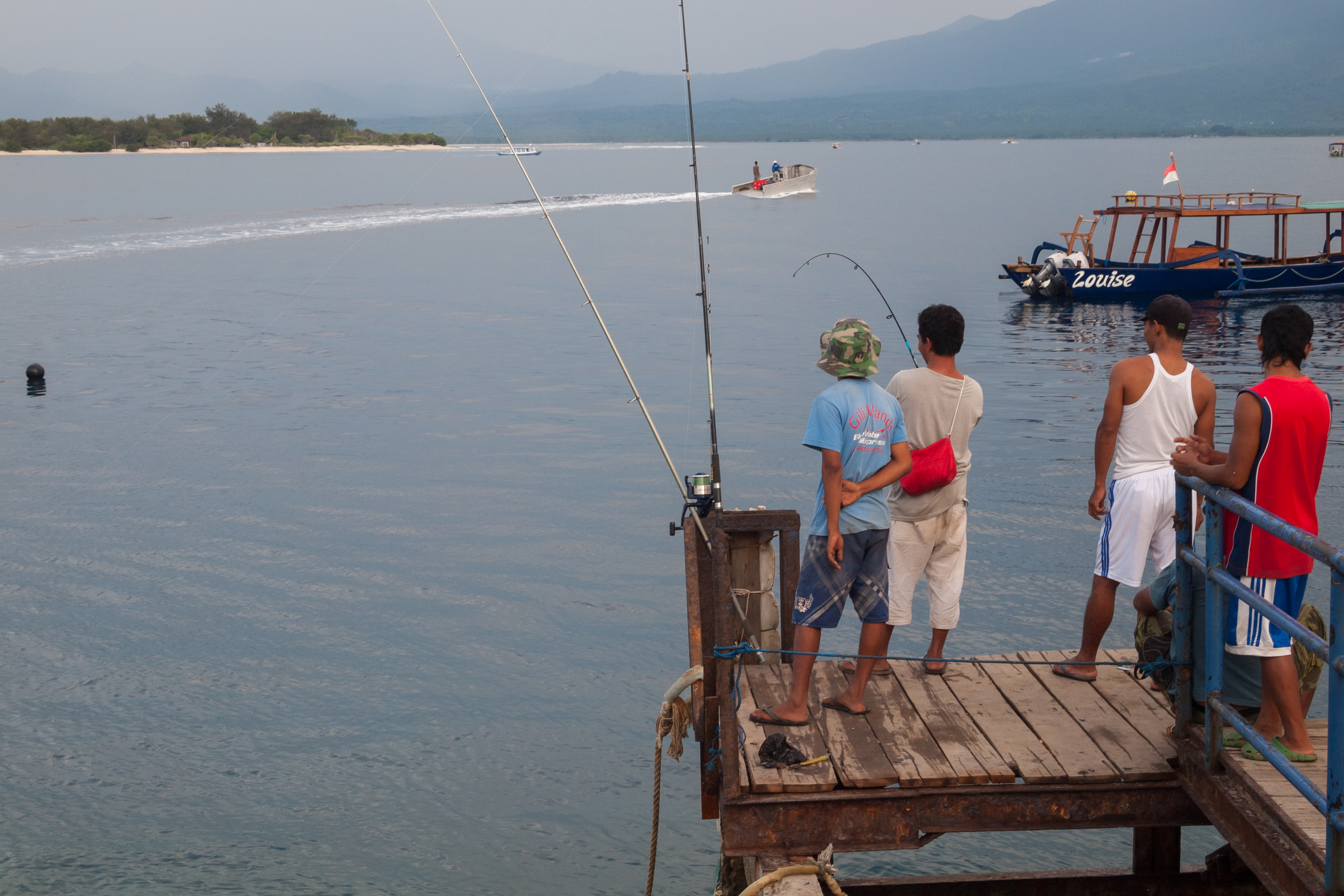
Fishing in Gili Trawangan

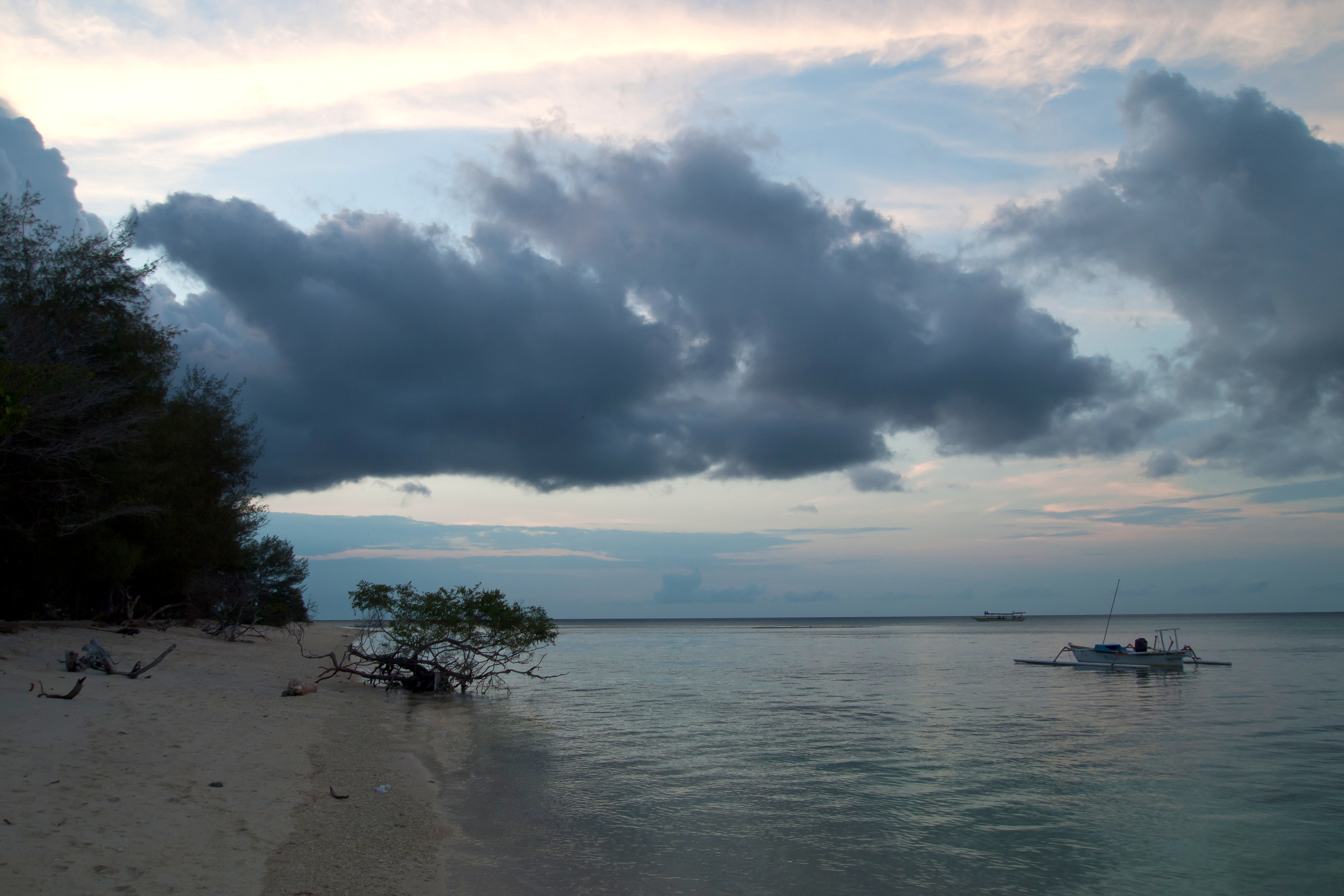
Gili Meno after dusk

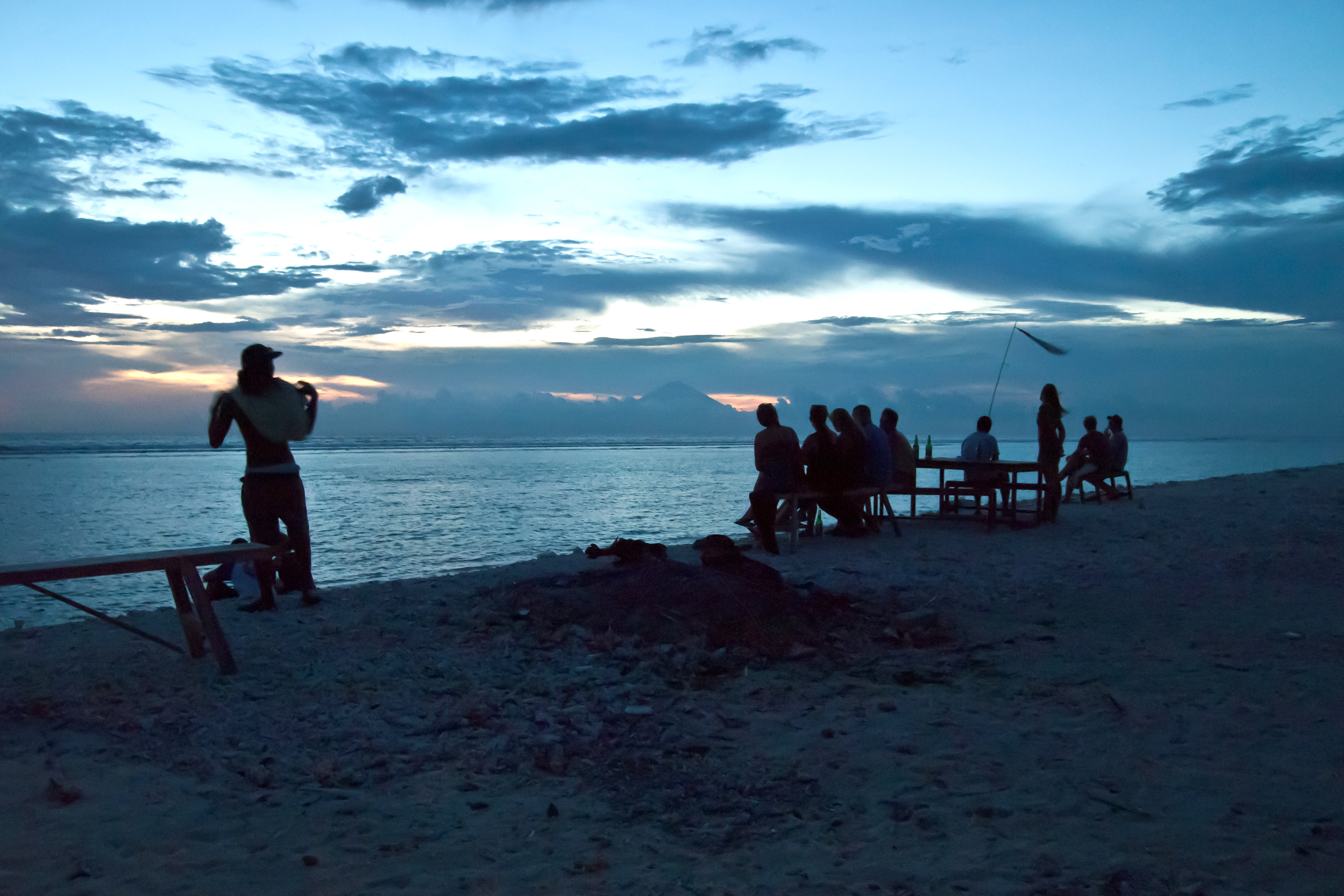
Gili Trawangan after dusk
