= North Lombok Regency =

Regency in West Nusa Tenggara, Indonesia

North Lombok Regency Kabupaten Lombok Utara
- Regency
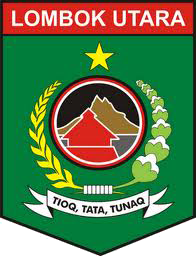
- Coat of arms
- Motto(s): Tioq, Tata, Tunaq (Grow, Nurture, Take care)
- Location within West Nusa Tenggara

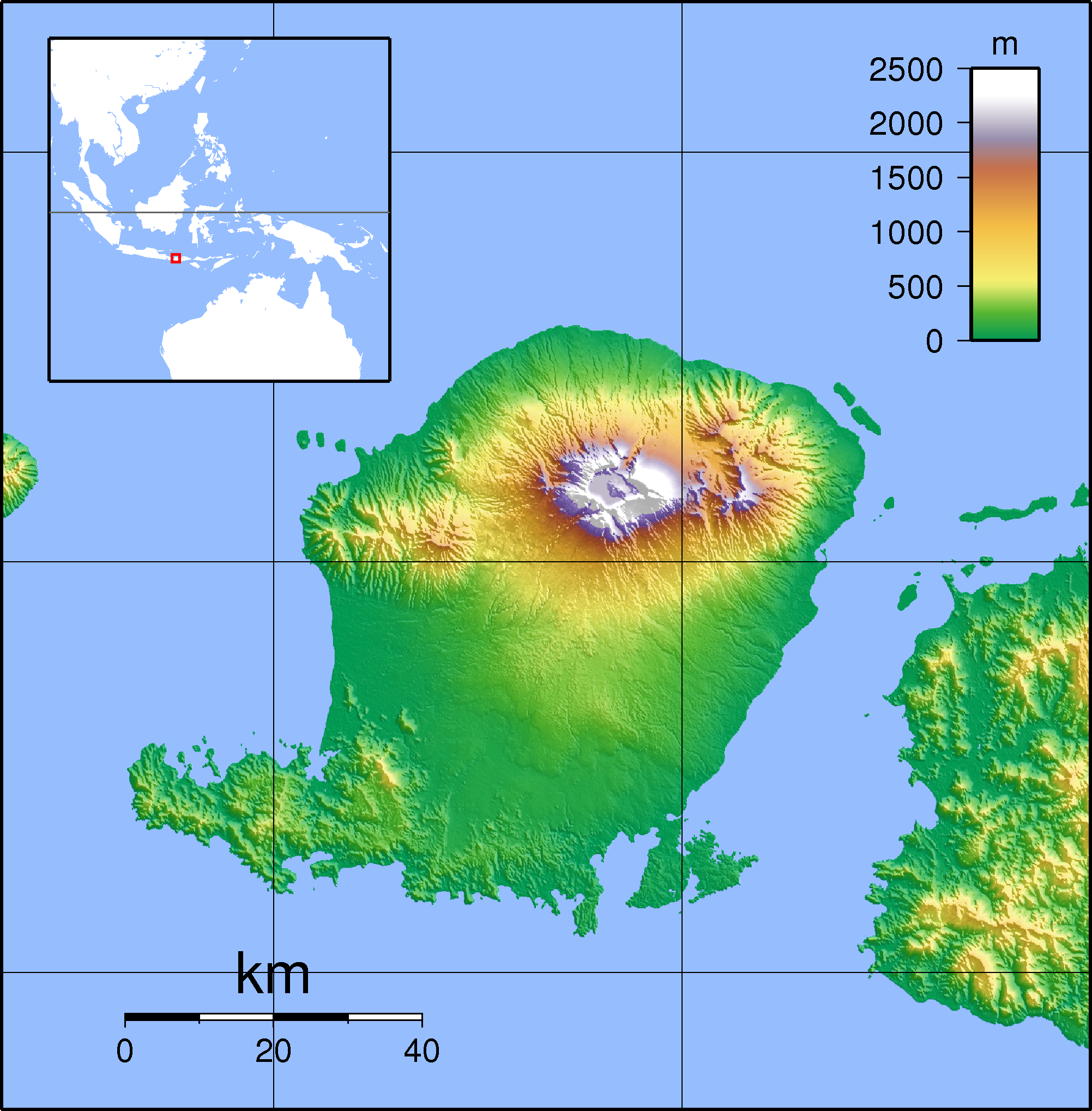
- Location in Lombok, Lesser Sunda Islands and Indonesia North Lombok Regency (Lesser Sunda Islands) North Lombok Regency (Indonesia)
- Coordinates: 8°21′S 116°9′E
- Country: Indonesia
- Province: West Nusa Tenggara
- Established: 2008 (from West Lombok)
- Capital: Tanjung

Government
  - Regent: Najmul Akhyar
  - Vice Regent: Kusmalahadi Syamsuri

Area
  - Land: 809.53 km^{2} (312.56 sq mi)
- Highest elevation: 3,726 m (12,224 ft)

Population (mid 2025 estimate)
  - Total: 265,176
  - Density: 323.1/km^{2} (837/sq mi)

Demographics
  - Ethnic groups: Sasak, Balinese, Javanese, Sumbawa people, Flores people
  - Religion: Muslim, Hindu, Christian, Buddhist
  - Languages: Indonesian (official), Sasak, Balinese (Lombok Balinese)
- Time zone: UTC+8 (ICST)
- Area code: (+62) 370
- Website: lombokutarakab.go.id

North Lombok Regency (Indonesian: Kabupaten Lombok Utara) is a regency of the Indonesian Province of West Nusa Tenggara. It is located in the northwest of the island of Lombok and includes the offshore Gili Islands. The capital is Tanjung situated on the northwest coast of the island. The regency covers an area of 809.53 km^{2} and had a population of 200,072 at the 2010 Census and 247,400 at the 2020 Census; the official estimate as at mid 2025 was 265,176 (comprising 133,045 males and 132,131 females).

The symbolism behind the Lambang of Kabupaten Lombok Utara (the regency's symbolic logo) is to describe the society of North Lombok as a faithful and obedient people, unified under the Republic of Indonesia in a community having a tradition of integrity, religious strength and awareness of the cosmos. These principles providing a strong base for the people of North Lombok to work together in a disciplined and responsible society building a prosperous and ordered community. The motto of the regency is "Tioq Tata Tunaq".

== Location ==
North Lombok Regency is bounded by the Java Sea to the north, Central Lombok Regency and West Lombok Regency to the south, East Lombok Regency to the east and the Lombok Strait to the west. Central to the regency is Mount Rinjani, which at 3,726 metres (12,224 ft) is the third highest mountain and the second largest volcano in the country; it is an active volcano. The oldest recorded historical eruption was in 1847 and last eruption was in May 2010

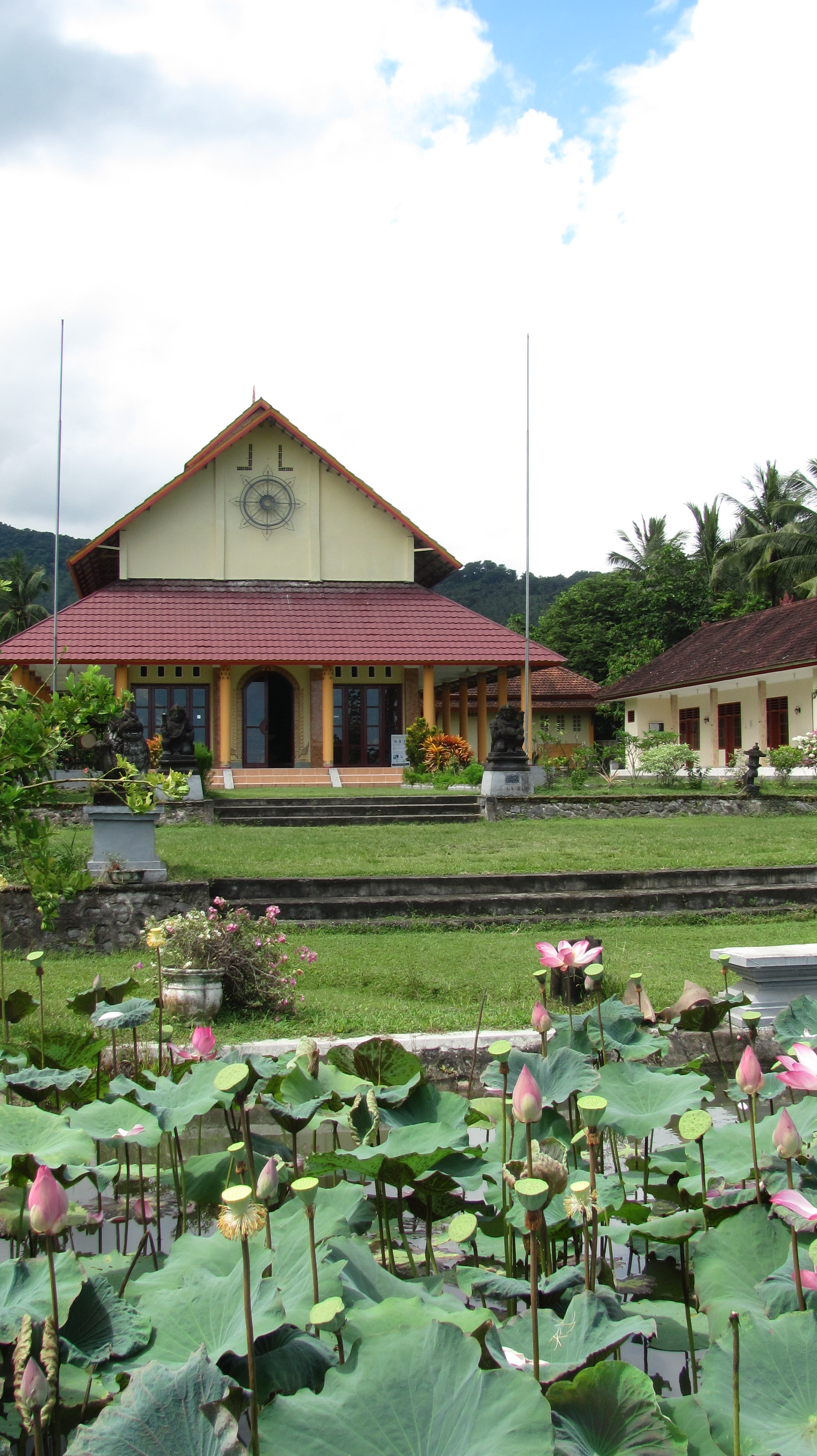
Buddhist temple Sutta Dhamma Lenek near Tanjung

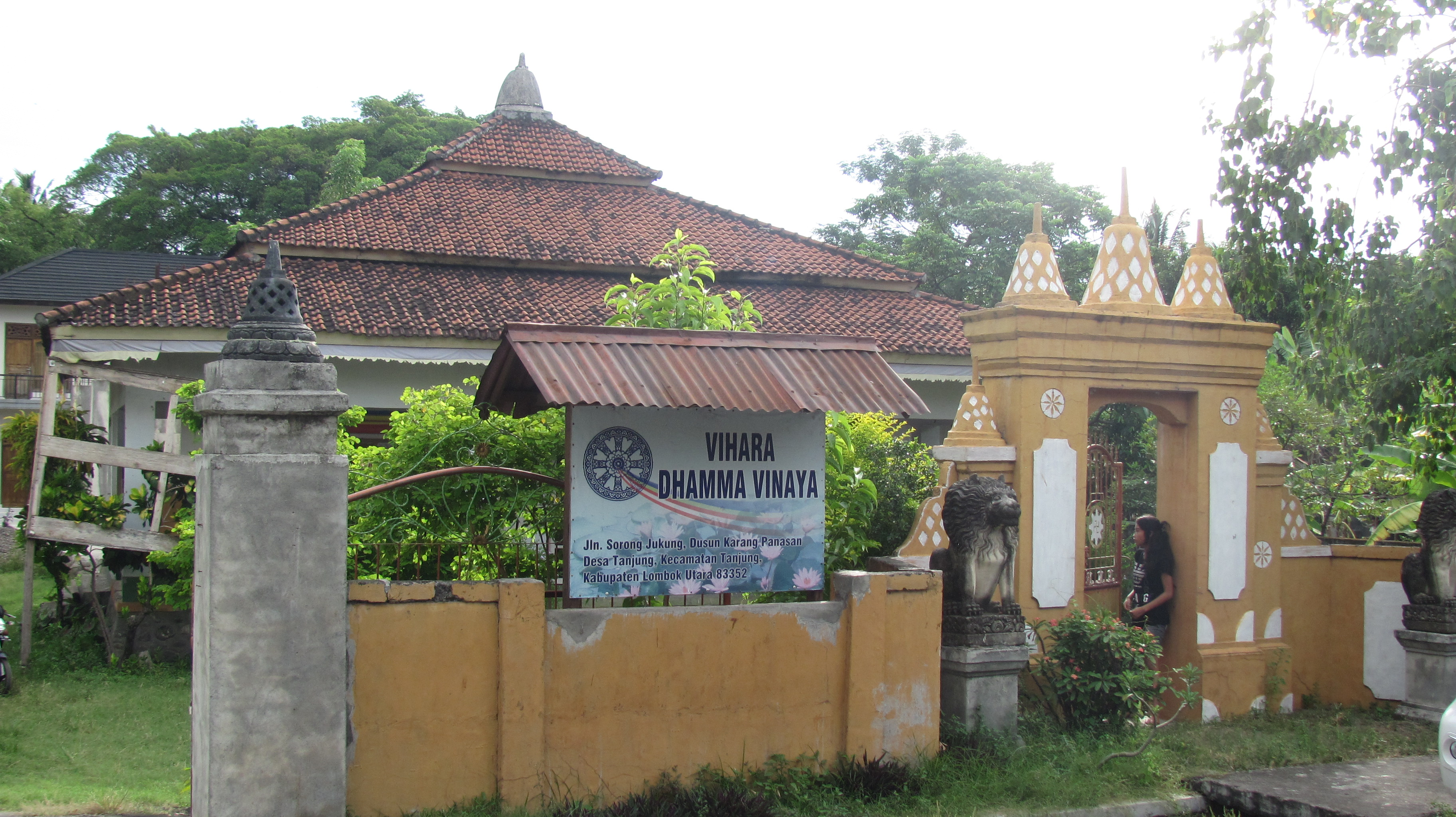
Buddhist temple Vihara Dhamma in Tanjung

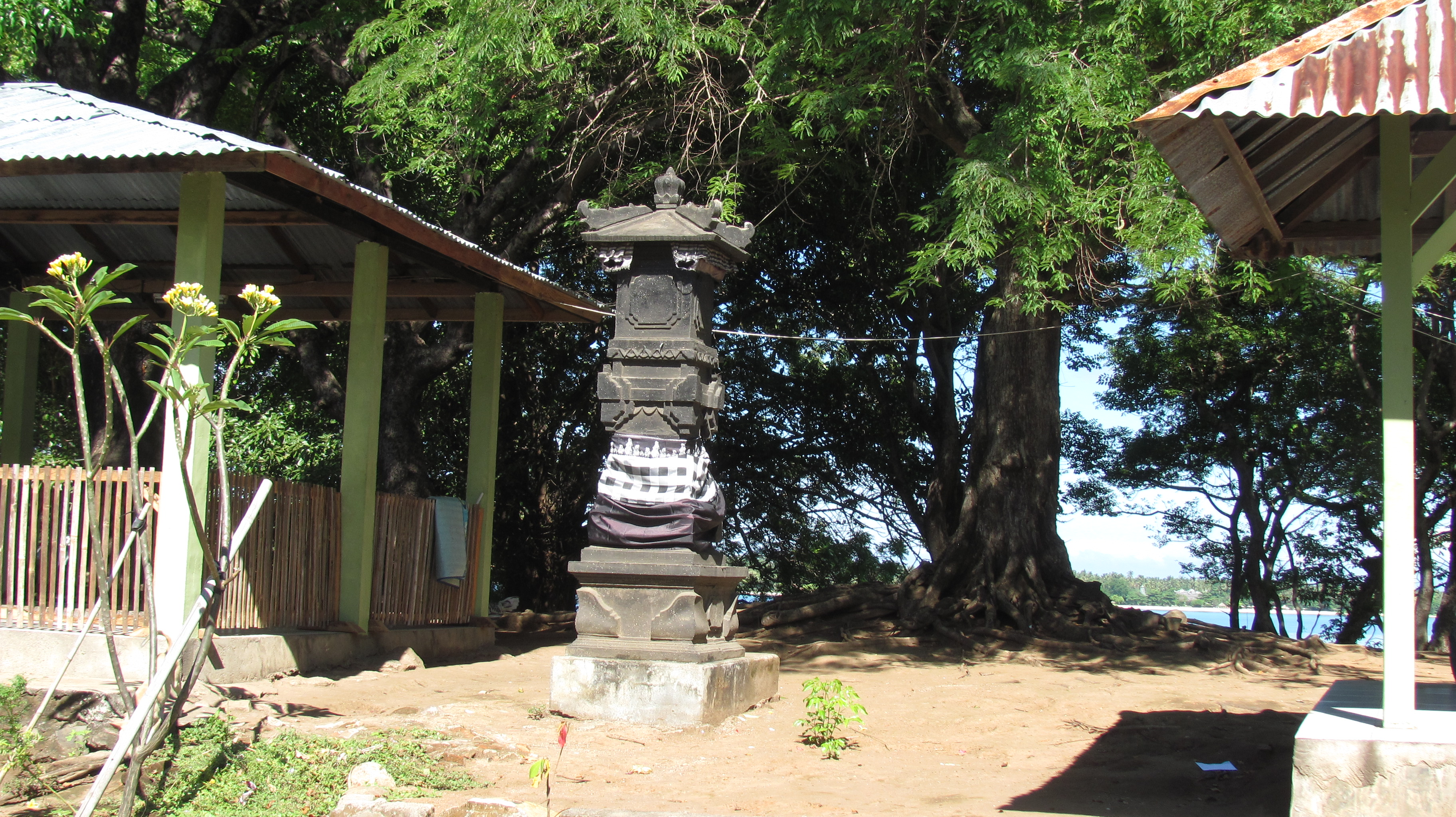
Pura Medana, a Hindu temple in the west of Tanjung

== History ==
The Regency of West Lombok was established in 1958 and then included the northwestern section of Lombok, comprising the five West Coast districts north of Ampenan and Sengigi - Pemenang, Tanjung, Gangga, Kayangan and Bayan.

In 1993 the West Lombok Regency was separated into two separate Regencies. As a consequence of the formation of the Government of Mataram city in year 2000, the capital of West Lombok Regency was moved from Mataram, West Lombok to Gerung in the south of the Regency. This move resulted the five districts in the northwestern end of the island being too far away from the services of the West Lombok Regency at Gerung. Subsequently, and with the full support of the local government of West Lombok Regency, North Lombok established its own regional government situated at Tanjung and now functions autonomously from the West Lombok Regency. The Regency was ratified by Law Number 26 Year 2008, creating the North Lombok Regency from within the existing boundaries of the West Lombok Regency.

Central to the regency is Mount Rinjani (Gunung Rinjani) which at 3,726 m is the third highest mountain and the second largest volcano in the country. It is an active volcano; the oldest recorded historical eruption was in 1847 and last eruption was in May 2010. Gunung Rinjani Observation Post Rinjani Sembalun is located in the village of Lawang, Sub Sembalun 12.5 km (4000 feet) northeast of Gunung Rinjani. Observers at this post monitor both Gunung Rinjani and Gunung Barujari

=== Rinjani eruptive history ===
Rinjani erupted three times on 22 May 2010 with activity continuing until early on 23 May. According to the volcano's official monitoring agency, ash from Mount Barujari was reported as rising up to two km into the atmosphere and damaged crops. The volcano did not threaten villagers at that time. Lava flowed into the caldera lake, pushing its temperature up from 21 °C to 35 °C, while smoke spread 12 km. In February 2010 observers at the Gunung Rinjani Observation Post located 12.5 km (4000 feet) NE of Rinjani saw one whitish-colored plume that rose 100 metres (328 ft) from the volcano. Dense whitish plumes (and possibly brown) rose 500 metres (1,640 ft) - 900 metres (2,953 ft) in March 2010 on 26 occasions and as high as 1,500 metres (4,921 ft) in April 2010 on 41 occasions. Plumes seen on 1 and 2 May 2010 were "chocolate" in color and rose a maximum height of 1,600 metres (5,249 ft). From February 2010 through April 2010 seismicity decreased, although the maximum amplitude of earthquakes increased. CVGHM (Center of Volcanology and Geological Hazard Mitigation) also noted that ash eruptions and ejected incandescent material fell within Rinjani caldera, but some ash was blown out of the caldera.

=== Earthquake in 2018 ===
On 5 August 2018, at 6.46 pm local time a 7.0-magnitude earthquake rocked the island of Lombok and parts of nearby Bali causing particularly severe damage in North Lombok. A total of 105 people were reported to have been killed, over 70 of whom died in North Lombok. A foreshock occurred on July 29, 2018, with a moment magnitude of 6.4 which also caused significant damage and claimed the lives of 20 people and injured hundreds more. Local authorities were active after the earthquake, aiming to provide food supplies and other forms of relief to the affected areas. Following the quake, the Indonesian National Disaster Mitigation Agency (BNPB, or Badan Nasional Penanggulanan Bencana) issued regular reports in Indonesian providing information about likely risks and about relief efforts.

Later tallies raised the death toll in the regency to over 300, with the BNPB estimating that 198,846 people were displaced by the earthquake - over 90% of the regency's population.

== Administration ==

Kabupaten Lombok Utara (North Lombok Regency) is one of Lombok's four regencies or administrative regions.

- TGH M Zainul Majdi, MA., Governor of NTB (West Nusa Tenggara) (Mataram is the provincial capital of West Nusa Tenggara.)
- H. Djohan Sjamsu, SH. Regent (Bupati) of Kabupaten Lombok Utara (North Lombok Regency). Inaugurated on 2 August 2010, Tanjung, North Lombok.
- SH dan H. Najmul Akhyar, SH, MH. Vice Regent (Wakil Bupati) inaugurated 2 August 2010, Tanjung, North Lombok.

=== Administrative boundaries ===
Boundary	District	Regency
North		Java Sea
South	Batu Layar; Praya	West Lombok Regency; Central Lombok Regency
West		Lombok Strait
East	Praya	East Lombok Regency

In late September 2010, a border dispute emerged over the new regional boundaries. Central to the dispute was the new border dividing the North Lombok Regency from West Lombok Regency at a point where it traversed the village of Lembah Sari situated west of Pemenang. Villagers from the 14 hamlets that form Lembah Sari felled a large tree on the side of the main inland road connecting the northern region to that of West Lombok Regency and the City of Mataram so that it formed a roadblock and then manned the roadblock in protest to the boundary alignment. Residents decided to move an apparent border between the two districts that followed the line of division between West Pemenang and Lembah Sari. A police detachment later re-opened the road to allow workers from West Lombok Regency to commence work to clear the road. Limited thru traffic was restored after 7 hours of blockade. The North Lombok Regency made public statements to clarify that district authorities would abide by whatever decision was made by the provincial government regarding regional boundaries. 34 villages that were formerly part of West Lombok are now part of North Lombok.

== Regency boundaries ==
North Lombok Regency is bounded by:

- The Java Sea to the north
- The West Lombok Regency to the southwest
- The Central Lombok Regency to the south
- The East Lombok Regency to the east
- The Lombok Strait to the west

== Administrative districts ==
North Lombok Regency consists of five administrative districts (kecamatan), tabulated below with their areas and their populations at the 2010 Census and the 2020 Census, together with the official estimates as at mid 2025. The table also includes the locations of the district administrative centres, the number of administrative villages in each district (all classed as rural desa), and its postal codes.

Kode Wilayah	Name of District (kecamatan)	Area in km^{2}	Pop'n Census 2010	Pop'n Census 2020	Pop'n Estimate mid 2025	Admin centre	No. of villages	Post codes
52.08.05	Pemenang ^{(a)}	81.09	32,546	39,864	42,728	Pemenang Timur	4	83352
52.08.01	Tanjung	115.64	44,606	54,242	58,140	Tanjung	7	83350
52.08.02	Gangga	157.35	40,836	51,396	55,089	Gondang	5	83353
52.08.03	Kayangan	126.35	37,413	47,766	51,198	Kayangan	8	83356
52.08.04	Bayan	329.10	44,671	54,132	58,021	Anyar	9	83354
	Totals	809.53	200,072	247,400	265,176	Tanjung	33	

Note: (a) including the offshore Gili Islands - Gili Trawangan, Gili Meno and Gili Air.

== Population ==
The majority of the population are Sasak people. At the 2010 Census, North Lombok Regency recorded a total of 200,072 inhabitants, which rose to 247,400 at the 2020 Census and reached an estimated 265,176 in mid 2025.

== Ethnicity ==
The Sasak people are the indigenous people of Lombok and form the majority of north Lombok's residents. north Lombok is also home to people of Balinese, Chinese, Tionghoa-peranakan people of mixed Indonesian and Chinese descent and small number of Arab Indonesian people, mainly of Yemeni descent who originally settled in the early port city of Ampenan.

== Religion ==
Islam is the religion of the majority population of north Lombok. Other religions practised in east Lombok are Christianity, Catholicism, Hinduism, Buddhism, and Confucianism.

The northern part of Lombok is home to the Wektu Telu ("Three times"), who as the name suggests pray only three times daily, instead of the five times stipulated in the Quran. Many of the Waktu Telu beliefs are entwined with animism. Waktu Telu has influences not only of Islam, but also Hinduism and pantheistic beliefs. There are also remnants of Boda (people without a religion) who maintain Pagan Sasak beliefs. There is some considerable uncertainty about this though as others believe that the term Buda was simply a pejorative term used by the Islamized Sasak to indicate those groups that refused to convert to Islam. If this hypothesis is true, the remnants of the Boda religion can be seen as representing a kind of original Sasak culture, undiluted by later Islamic innovations. Many influences of animist belief still prevail within the Sasak people and most Sasak people believe strongly in the existence of spirits or ghosts. These original Sask belief systems appear to be much stronger in the Northern areas of Lombok than elsewhere on the island The sasak people regard both food and prayer as indispensable whenever they seek to communicate with spirits, including the dead and many ritualistic traditional Sasak practices still endure despite the influences of both modernity and orthodox Islam. This is discussed in more detail in the Lombok article.

There are around 800 Buddhists living in and around Tanjung. The town is known for its two Buddhist temples. Pura Modena is a famous Hindu temple in the west of Tanjung.

== Language ==
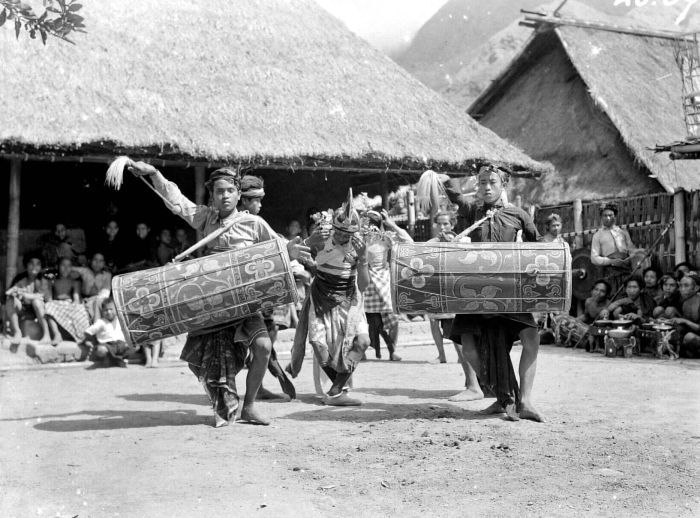
Traditional male dancers with drums, Lombok

Most people in North Lombok normally the Sasak language. Bahasa Sasak is the native language of the indigenous people of Lombok. Bahasa Indonesian is the language most widely used in everyday interactions at places such as the larger hotels and in the government offices. When at home or a place of recreation North Lombok residents tend to use local northern Lombok dialects of the Sasak language.

== Land use ==
Plantation sector

In August 2010 the Deputy Governor of West Nusa Teggara (NTB), Ir H Badrul Munir, MM, announced in Tanjung, North Lombok Regency, that the subdistrict of North Lombok has the potential to be developed as a plantation area, and as a national center for cocoa development in NTB, this region is rich with agricultural commodities such as cocoa, coffee, vanilla, and cloves.

== Transportation ==
Small public ferries provide passenger access between Bangsal harbour and the Gili Islands. These are operated by the Sea Transportation Maritime Co-operative (Koperasi Angkutan Laut Karya Bahari). The Koperasi is in principle a community co-operative and they operate three boat services; the Public Boat, the Shuttle boat, the Island Hopping boat and also offer (official) Charter boats. The craft are principally of local design and wooden construction powered by petrol fuelled outboard engines. Prices are set by Kebupaten decree, the pricing of current operations is defined by Pengumuman Dinas Perhubungan Lombok Barat no.:551/662/V/dishub tanggal 26 Mei 2008. Informal private charter services also serve the Bangsal-Gili islands routes and inter-island traffic.

Small high speed passenger craft such as speedboats connect the Gili Islands to Teluk Nare on the Lombok mainland immediately to the east of the Gili islands and Senggigi a little further south along the coast. Speedboat services are also available for local in-shore charters from Teluk Nare a little south of Bangsal and at Gili islands. The majority of the speedboat services are owned and operated by the local hotels and dive shops.

Fast boat services are small high speed craft operating multiple daily scheduled high speed boat services across the Lombok Strait westward to Bali. The craft are of light duty construction having either fibreglass or aluminium hulls and are powered by petrol fuelled outboards. Significant operational and safety issues plague these vessels and the operators.

In August 2010 the Deputy Governor of West Nusa Teggara (NTB), Ir H Badrul Munir, MM, announced plans for the government to assist development in the tourism sector in North Lombok. These plans, including improvements to land and sea transportation infrastructure are intended to assist with the tourist traffic going to the three Gili islands. Improvements are to include safety, convenience and transit time for operations of the public ferry co-operative providing the services crossing between Bangsal and Gili Trawangan.

Passenger and vehicle ferries:

- Lombok Strait: Tanjung Lembar Lombok - Padang Bai, Bali, with 12 ferries providing crossings once every hour.
- Alat Strait: Labuhan Lombok - Pototano, Sumbawa with 8 ferries providing 18 crossings per day.

These drive on, drive off ferries provide the principal facilities for road transport movements in and out of Lombok. Disruptions on these routes can significantly affect trade and the provision of supplies to the island as the shipping operators on these routes will often suspend services due to breakdown or heavy seas.

Tanjung Lembar seaport in the southwest of the island provides facilities for small freighters and fishing boats.

Public buses and Bemo run both along the west coast from the south and through Pusuk pass to connect to Mataram and Cakranegara. Limited services are available on the east coast to connect to Praya and south toward Kuta.

North Lombok is served by the Lombok International Airport (Bandara Internasional Lombok) (IATA: LOP, ICAO: WADL).

Lombok International Airport in Central Lombok commenced operations on 1 October 2011 replacing the previous international and domestic facilities at Selaparang Airport near Ampenan in West Lombok Regency which formally closed for operations on the evening of 30 September 2011. All services previously operated at the Selaparang airport were moved across to the new airport at that time.

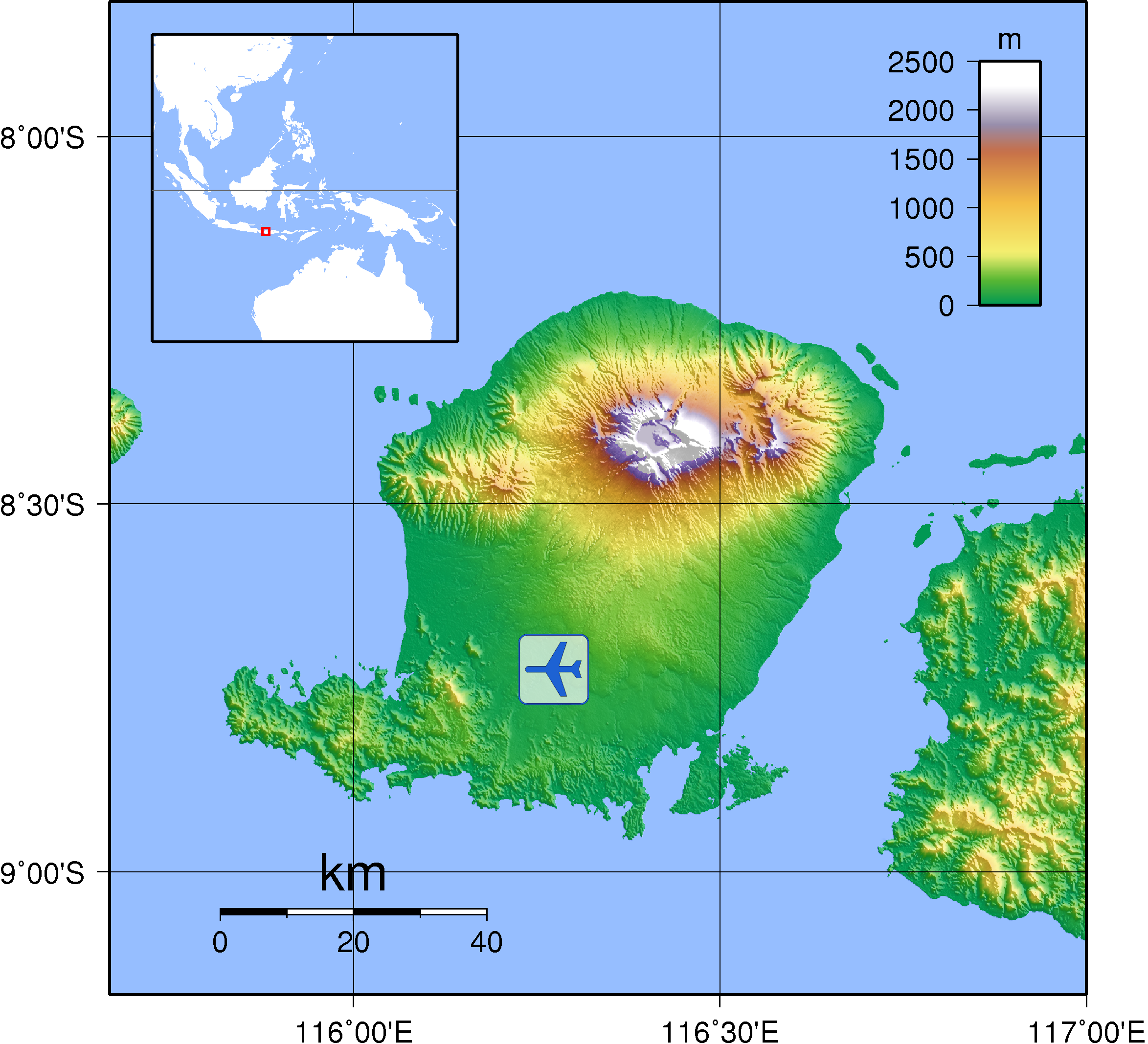

Limited helicopter charter is available from Bali and light fixed wing charter is available from both Lombok and Bali.

== Tourism and sights ==
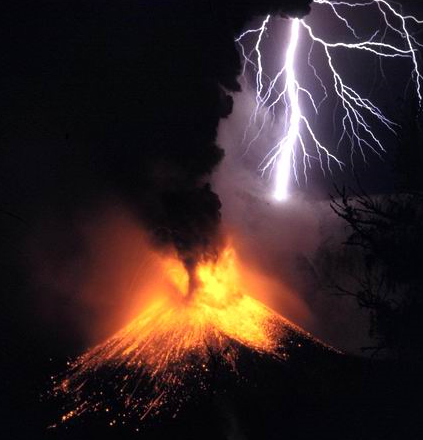
Rinjani erupting in 1994

The northern region of Lombok holds two of the island's most significant tourism attractions, Mount Rinjani (including Segara Anakan Lake) and the Gili Islands.

On the west coast this touristic region starts just north of the township of Senggigi at Klui beach and runs northward toward the northern townships of Pemenang and Tanjung.

Bangsal and Tanjunk Teluk near Pemenang provide services connecting across the short distance of water to the Gili islands off the Sire Peninsular just south of Tanjung. A little further to the north are Bayan and Senaru which offer the main gateways to access Mount Rinjani.

Gunung Rinjani National Park (Taman Nasional Gunung Rinjani) is popular for mountain climbs and trekking and represents an important nature reserve and water catchment area. The park is officially 41,330 hectares within the park boundaries and a further 66,000 hectares of protected forest outside. The mountain and its satellites form the Mount Rinjani National Park (Taman Nasional Gunung Rinjani) - officially 41,000 hectares within the park boundaries and includes a further 66,000 hectares of protected forest outside. In 2008, the Indonesian government proposed to UNESCO that Mount Rinjani be one of the world's official geoparks. If this was approved by UNESCO, Mount Rinjani would become the first such geological park in Indonesia.

- See the article on Mount Rinjani for more information.

Kosaido Golf Club is an international 18 holes championship course located on the Sire Peninsula in Tanjung. The course has views of Mt. Rinjani to the north east and the Gili Islands across the bay to the west. The course was designed by Peter Thompson, Michael Wolveridge & Perrett and pays respect to the natural onsite contours of the land. The 18 holes championship course offers a basic clubhouse facility.

In 2011, the regency serviced 337,646 domestic and foreign tourists. Mainly foreigners came from the West European countries.

Tanjung is known for its market and for its two Buddhist temples. Sutta Dhamma Lenek is a comparatively new temple near Tanjung. Vihara Dhamma in the centre of Tanjung was severely damaged by an earthquake in 2006. The temple is being reconstructed at present. Pura Modena is a famous Hindu temple in the west of Tanjung.

== Marina facilities ==
The newly established Medana Bay Marina at Medana Bay near Tanjung has twenty five mooring buoys in more than 5m of water for 35 ft to 45 ft vessels and anchorage space for another twenty vessels. The marina facilities were established in 2009 and hosted over 90 yacht during the Sail Indonesia event in September 2009.

=== Medana Bay Marina ===
- Medana Bay Marina is at: 8° 21.83'S 116° 07.75'E (traditional system: 8°21'50'S 116°07'45'E") and is situated at Medana Bay, Tanjung, North Lombok.
- The mooring basin is centred on 08°21.833’S and 116°07.750’E with an approach transit point almost due north at 08°20.432’S and 116°07.685’E.
- A current Sea Chart and sea approach tracks are available on the marina's website. Medana Bay is sometimes called Teluk Dalam, meaning Deep Bay.

In late July 2010 participants of Sail Indonesia – Sail Banda 2010 set sail from Darwin Sailing Club in northern Australia. After congregating in Labuhan Bajo on the western tip of Flores in early September 2010 they moved on to Medana Bay on the north-western coast of Lombok prior to moving on to Bali and Kalimantan. Medana Bay was an official stop-over on the itinerary. A repeat of the event is anticipated in 2011, departing Darwin on 23 July 2011, however a stop in Lombok is not on the itinerary.

== Sister city ==
- PRC, Haikou
