= Tanjung, Lombok =

Tanjung
- Town
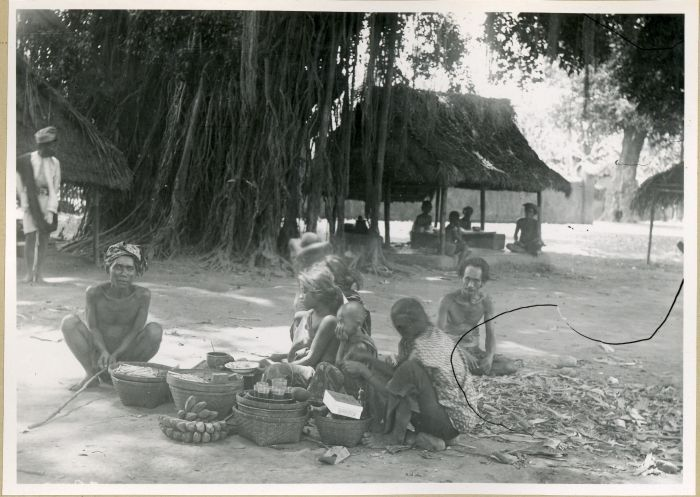
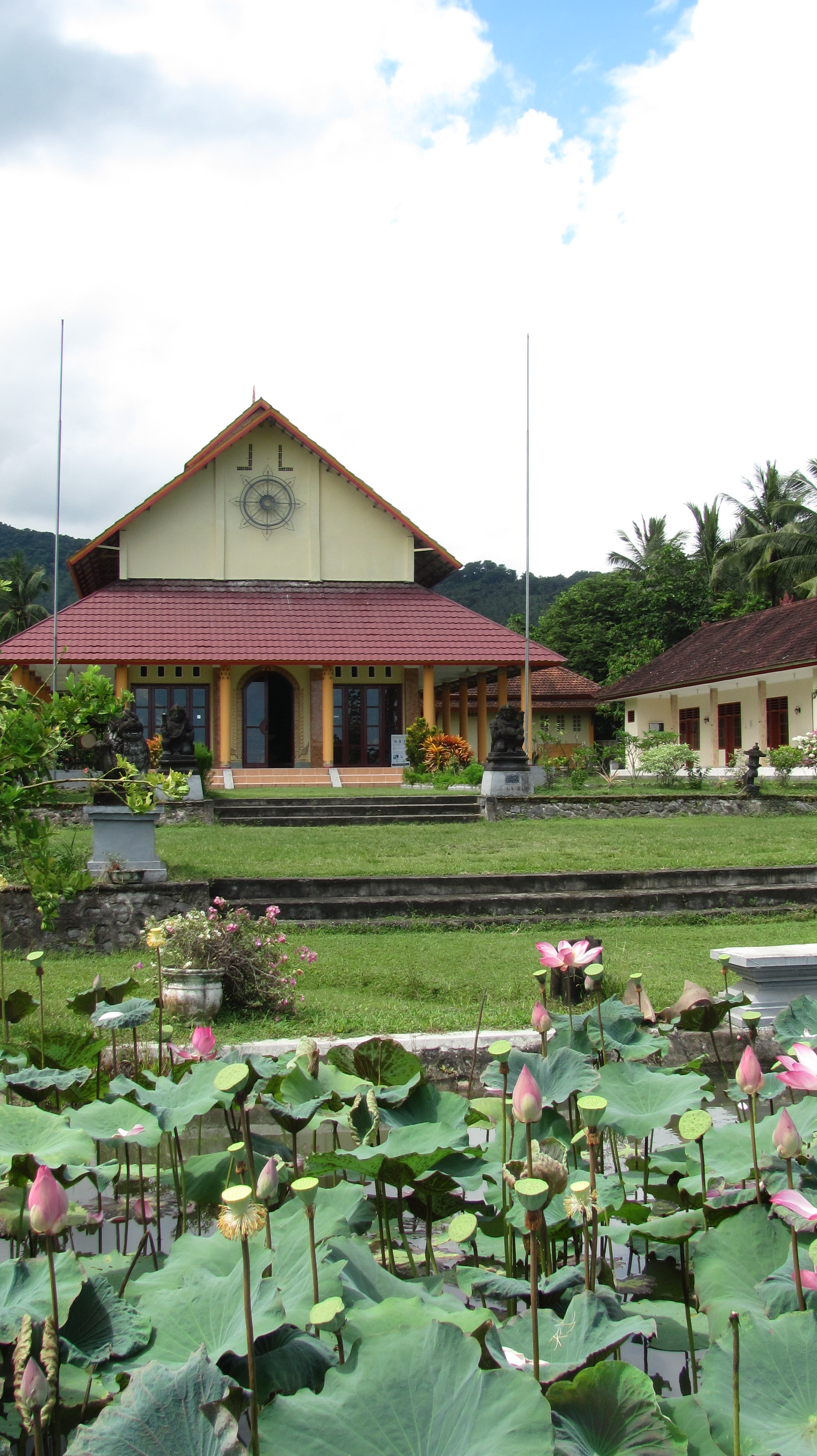
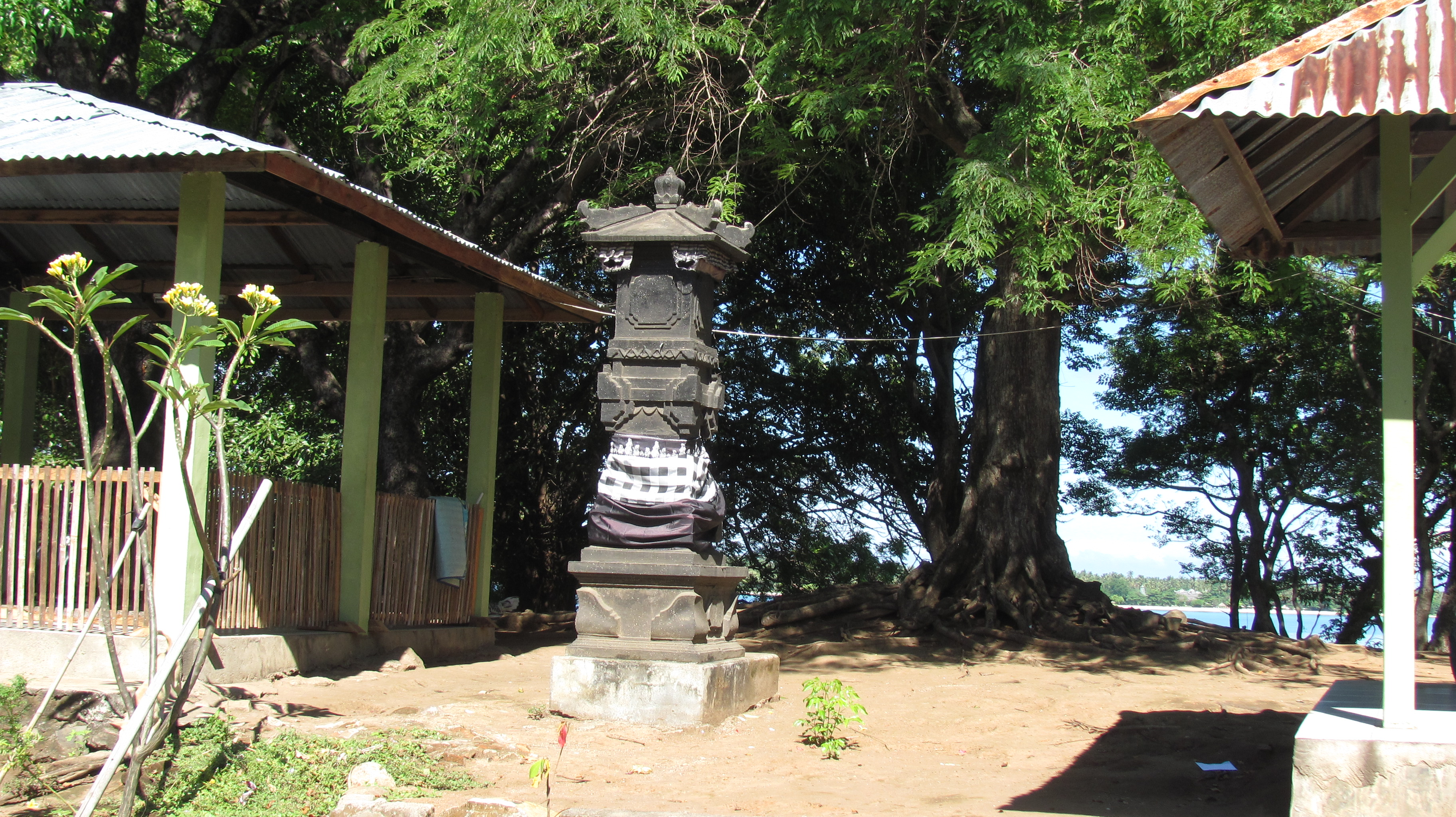
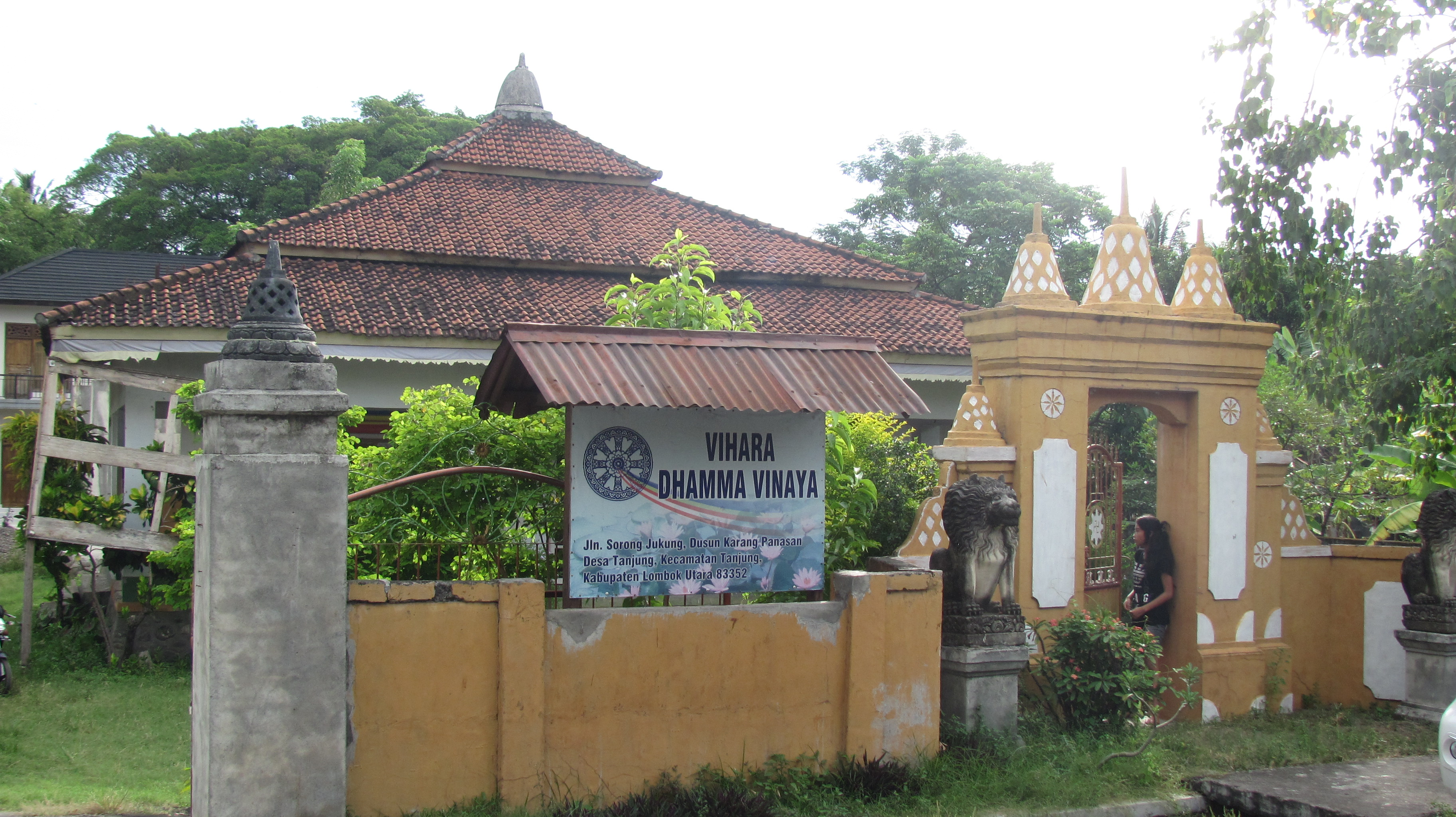
- From top, bottom to right: Market in Tanjung, Buddhist Temple Sutta Dhamma Lenek, Pura Medana a Hindu Temple in the west of Tanjung and Buddhist Temple Vihara Dhamma

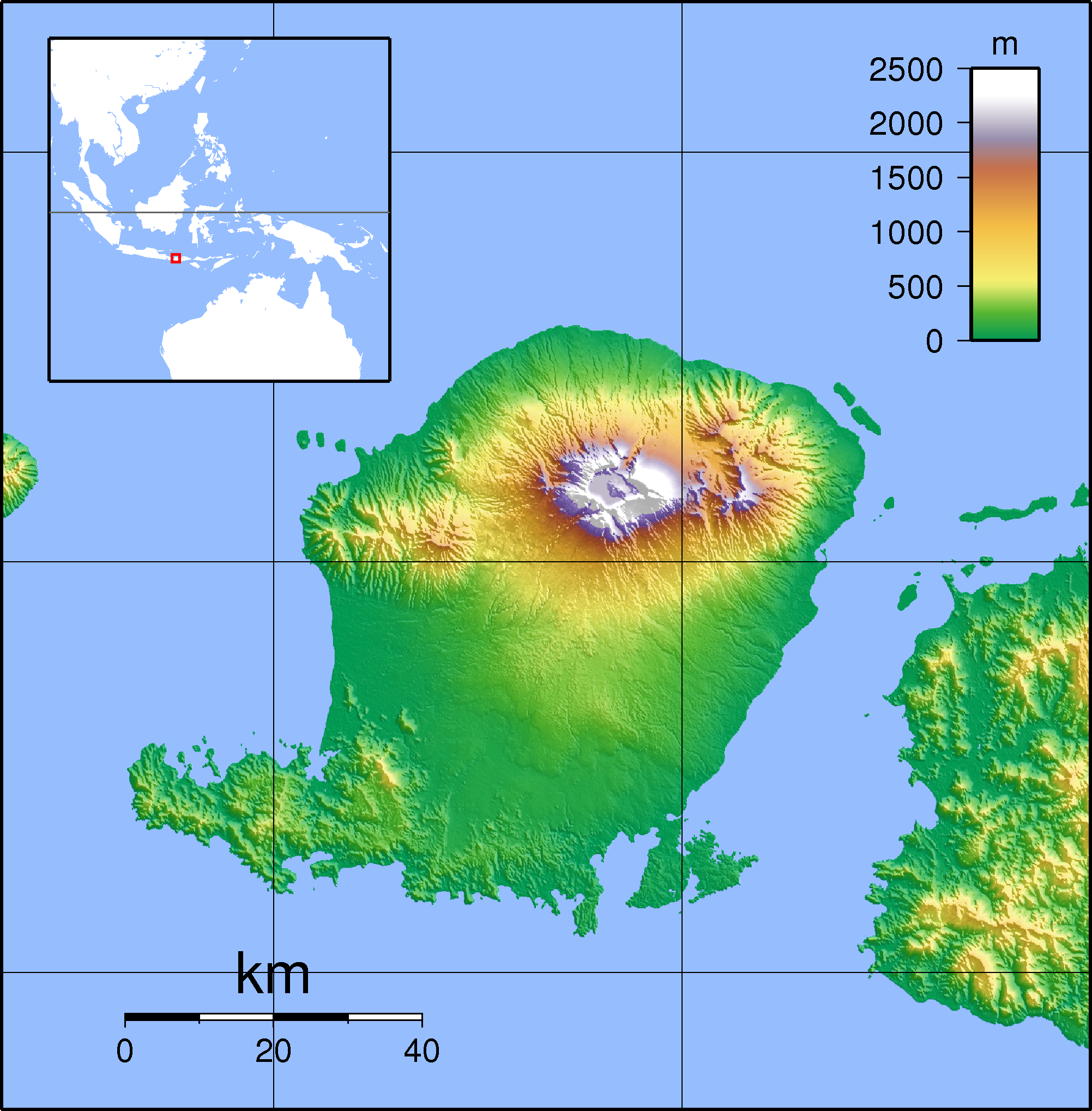
- Location in Lombok, Lesser Sunda Islands and Indonesia Tanjung (Lesser Sunda Islands) Tanjung (Indonesia)
- Coordinates: 8°21′S 116°9′E
- Country: Indonesia
- Region: Lesser Sunda Islands
- Province: West Nusa Tenggara
- Regency: North Lombok Regency

Area
  - Total: 115.64 km^{2} (44.65 sq mi)

Population mid 2024 estimate
  - Total: 57,346
  - Density: 495.90/km^{2} (1,284.4/sq mi)
- Time zone: UTC+8 (ICST)
- Area code: (+62) 370
- Villages: 7

Tanjung is a town and administrative district (kecamatan) on the island of Lombok. It is the local capital of the North Lombok Regency in the Indonesian province of West Nusa Tenggara. "Tanjung" means "cape" in Indonesian.

Tanjung is known for its market and its temples. There is a new Buddhist temple (Sutta Dhamma Lenek) near Tanjung. Another Buddhist Temple, Vihara Dhamma, can be visited in the centre of Tanjung. About 800 Buddhists live in and around Tanjung. Pura Medana is a significant Hindu temple to the west of Tanjung on the small Sira peninsula. Every Sunday a special cattle market is held in Tanjung.

There are various waterfalls to the east of Tanjung such as Air Terjung Gangga (Gangga waterfall) and Air Terjun Tiu (Tiu waterfall) with a height of 30 metres.

== Administrative villages ==
Tanjung consists of 7 villages (kelurahan or desa) namely:

- Jenggal
- Medana
- Sigar Penjalin
- Sokong
- Tanjung
- Tegal Maja
- Teniga
