= Senggigi =

- Place
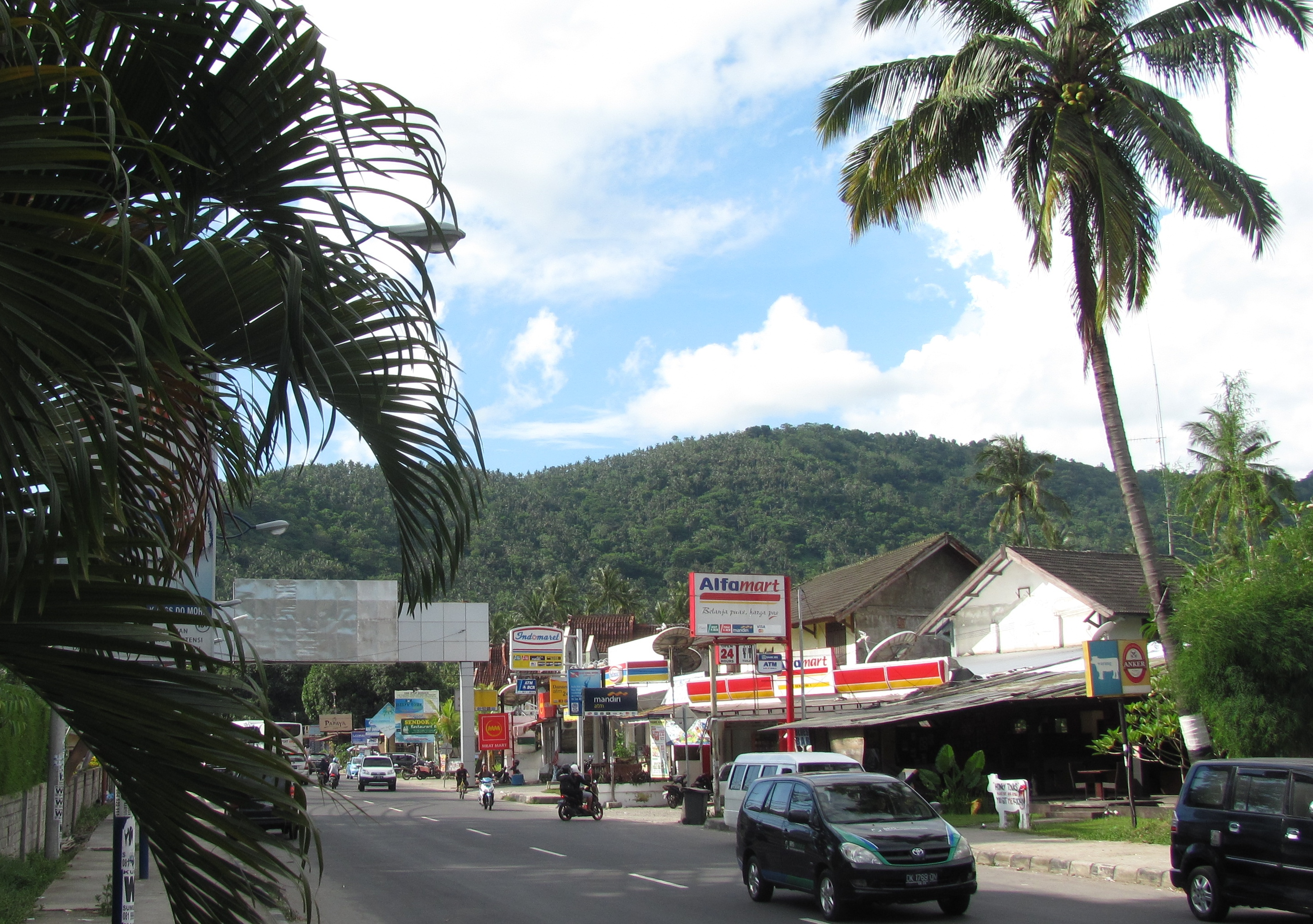
- High Street of Senggigi, northern part

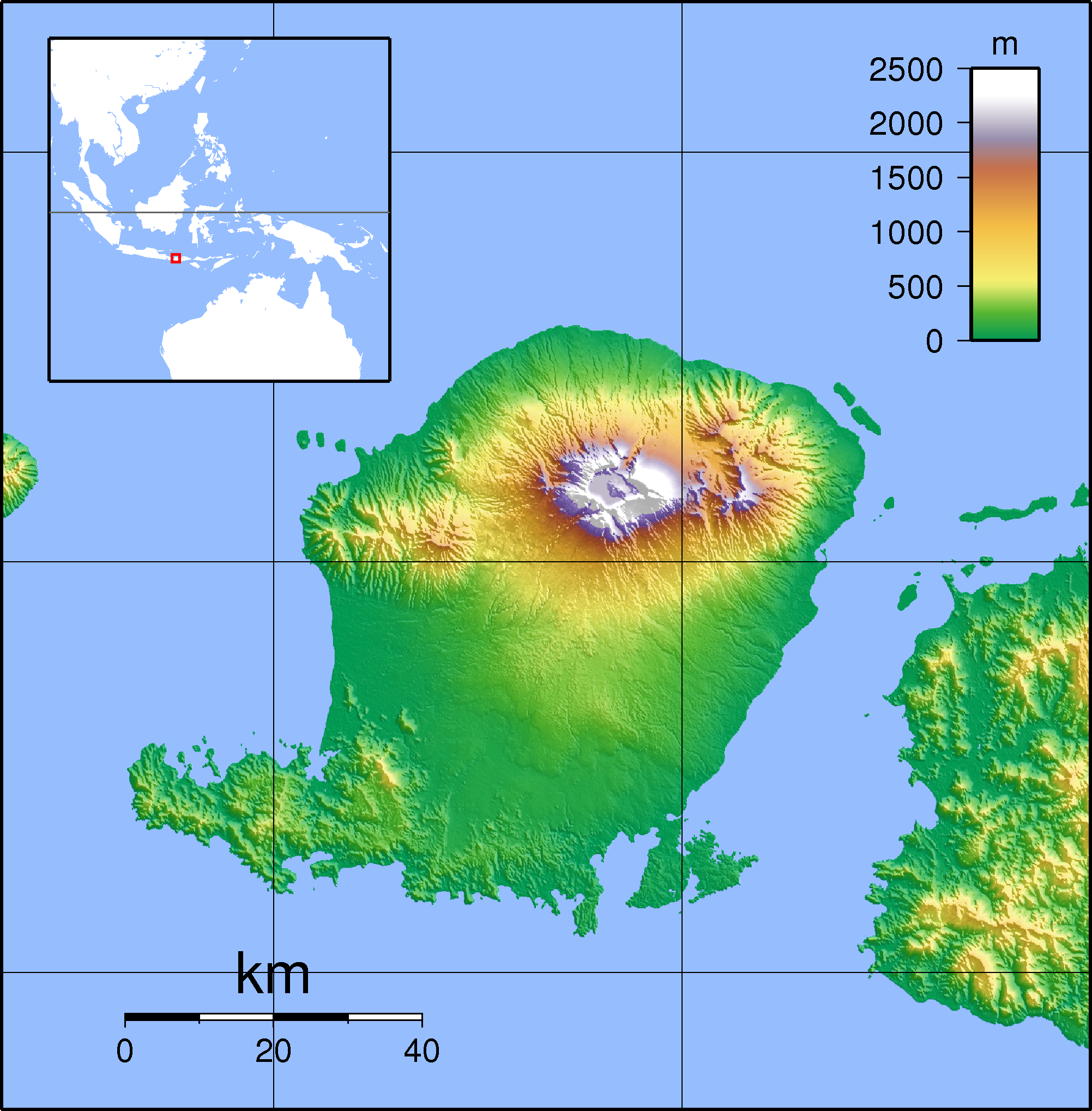
- Location in Indonesia Senggigi (Indonesia)
- Coordinates: 8°29′59″S 116°2′51″E
- Country: Indonesia
- Region: Lesser Sunda Islands
- Province: West Nusa Tenggara
- Regency: West Lombok
- Time zone: UTC+08

Senggigi used to be the main tourist strip of the Indonesian island of Lombok, stretched out along several kilometers of the beachfront just to the north of the capital, Mataram. The site of a building frenzy in the late 1990s when Lombok was hyped to be the next Bali, the communal violence of 2000 and the 2002 Bali bombing dealt Senggigi a severe blow, with tourist numbers declining precipitously and many construction projects halted. Senggigi has now fallen behind Kuta Lombok in the south of the island and the North Western Gili islands in terms of popularity and development.

== Sights ==
Pura Batu Bolong is a Hindu temple with 14 altars on a rock on the beach which is visited by many worshippers. The name means "Rock with a hole". In the south of Senggigi is the grave of Batu Layar (Makam Batu Layar), a Muslim saint. The salty waterfall at the end of Nambung Beach can be reached on foot or by boat.

== Gallery ==
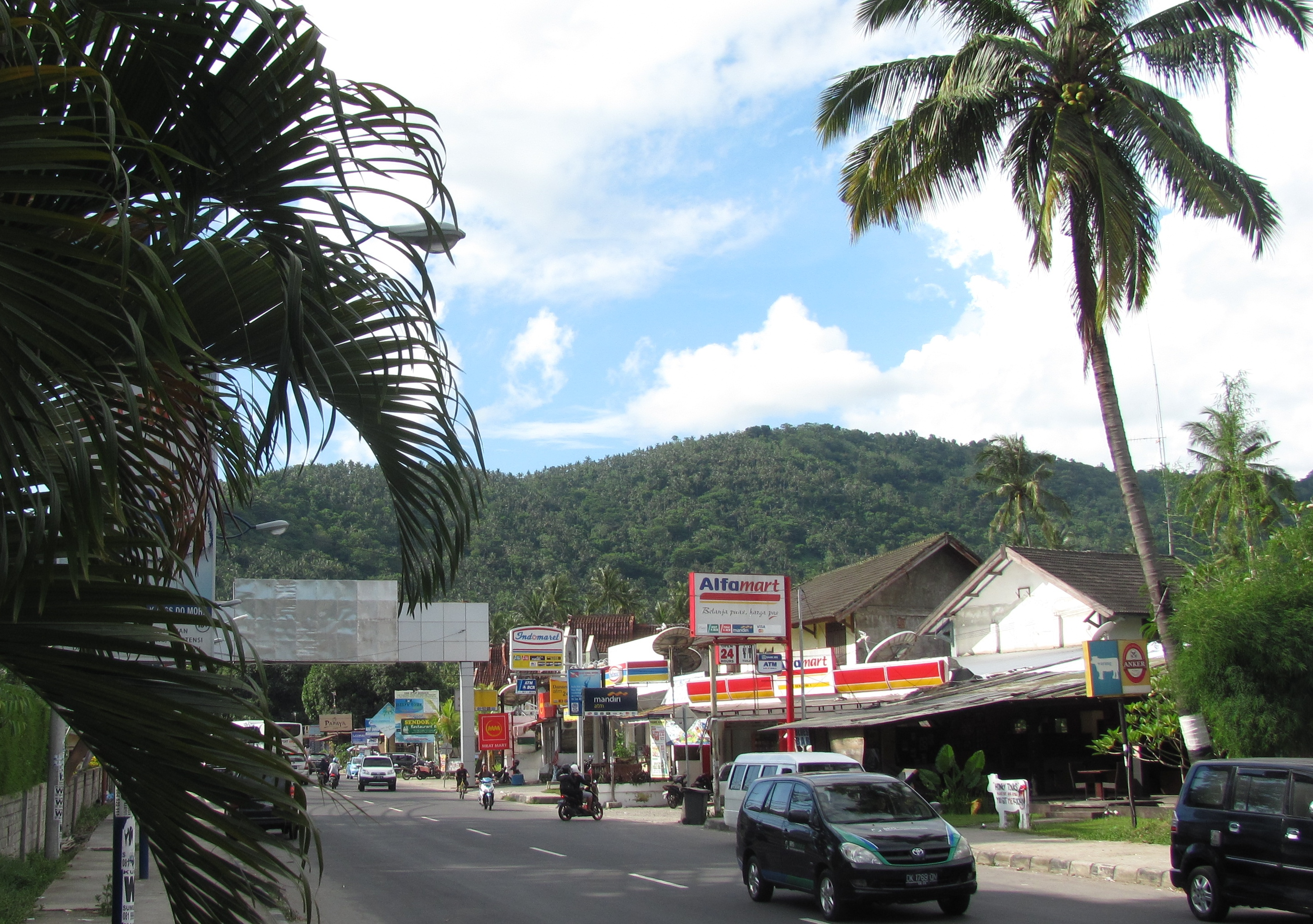
High Street of Senggigi, northern part

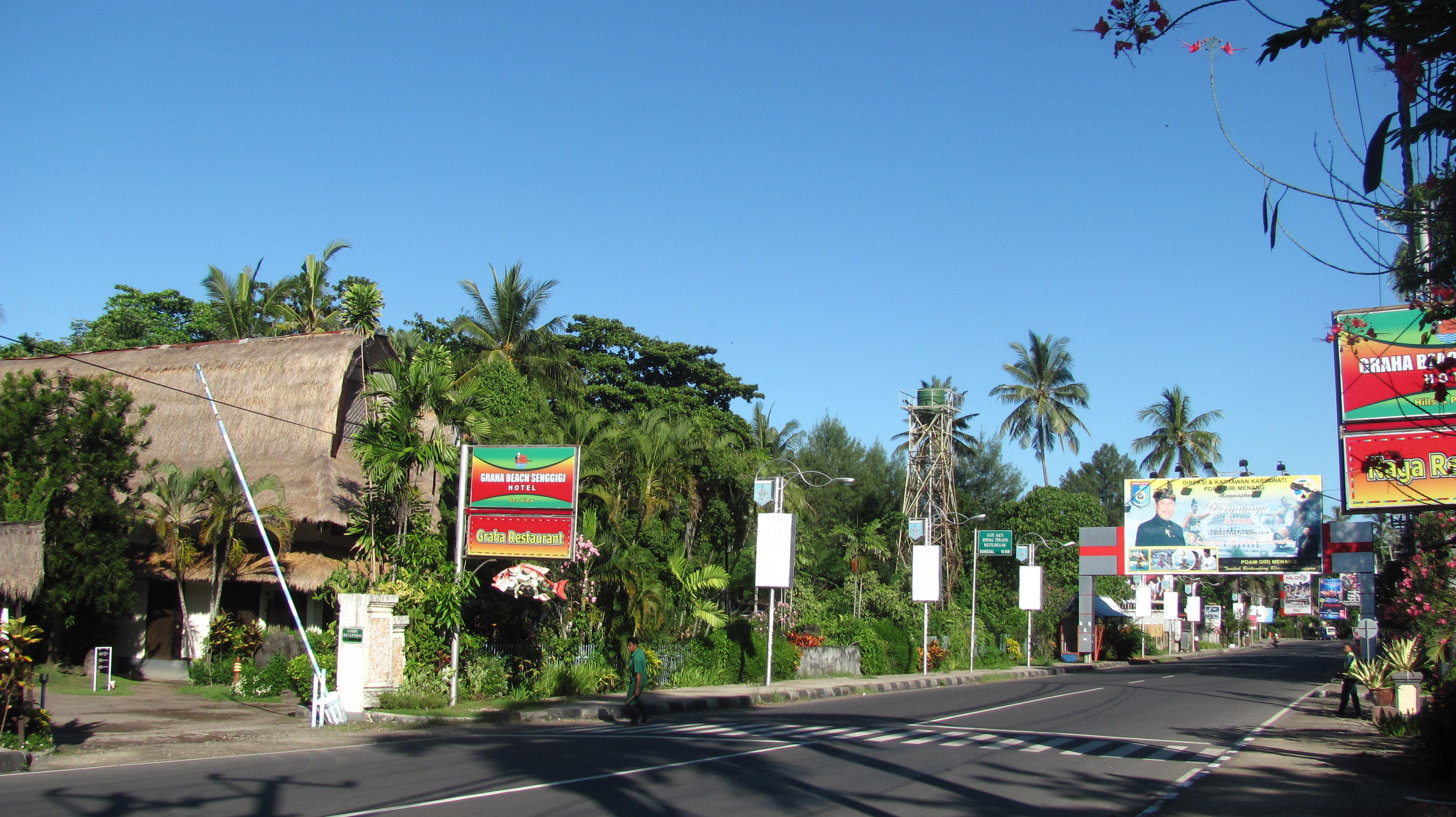
High Street, Senggigi, Lombok, Indonesia

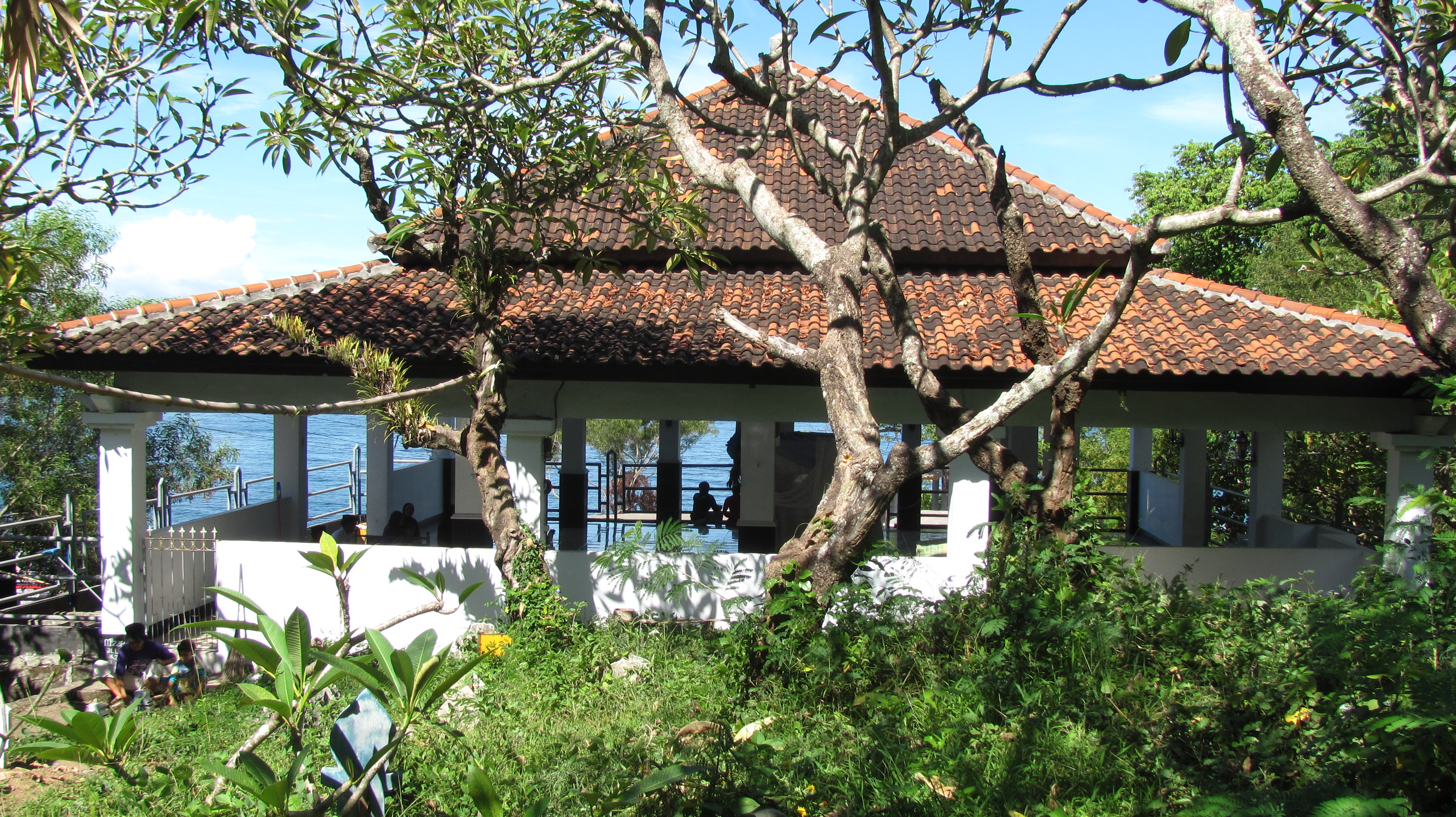
Grave of Batu Layar near Senggigi

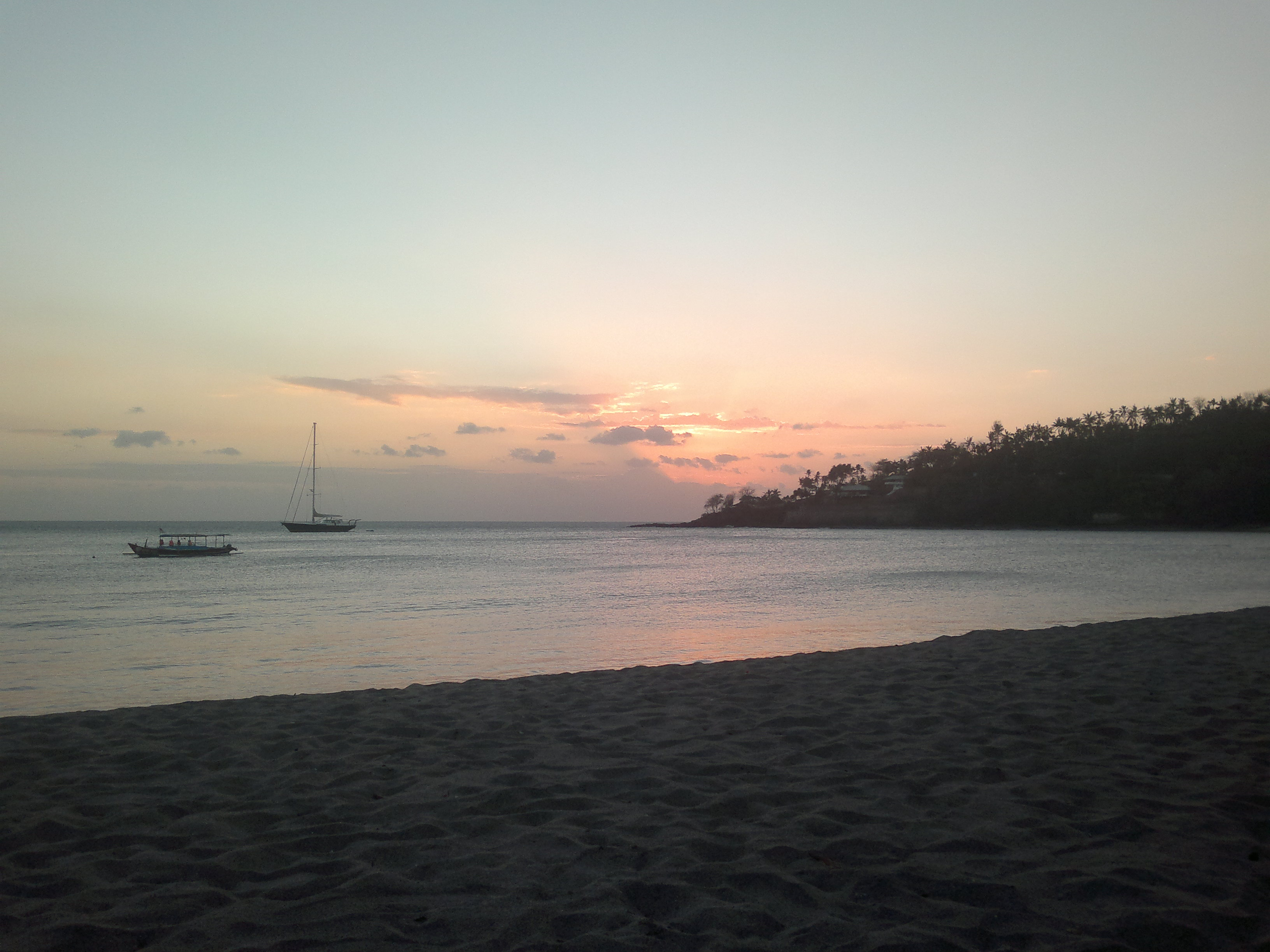
Senggigi Beach

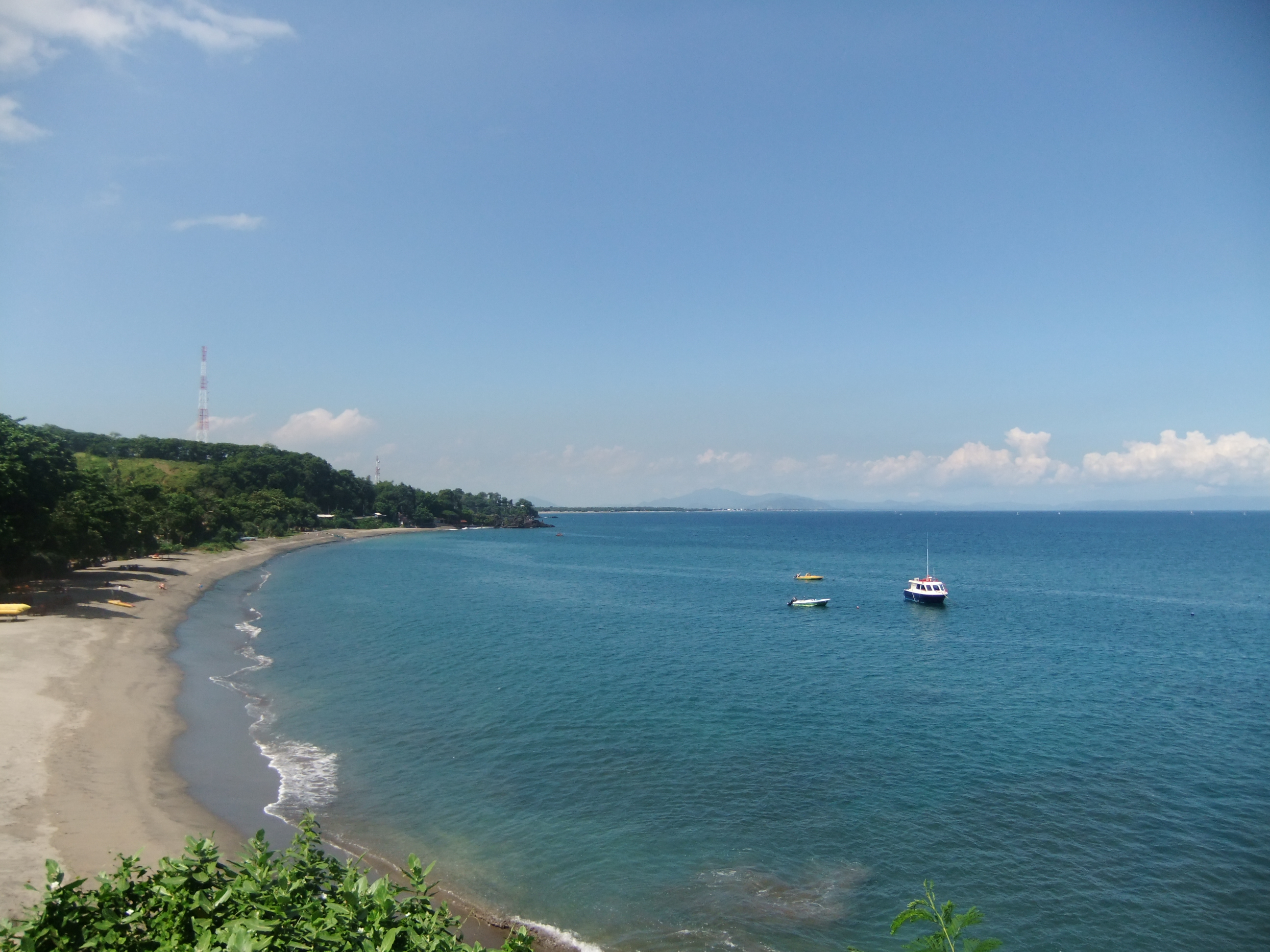
Senggigi Beach view from Jalan Raya Sengigi
