= Mayor of Mataram =

- Wali Kota Mataram
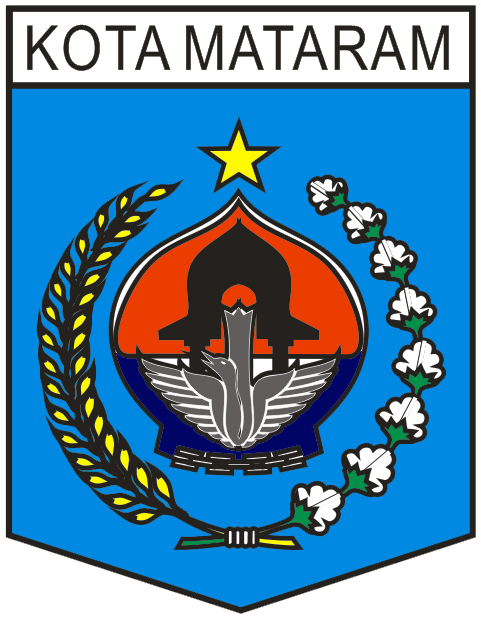
- Coat of arms of Mataram

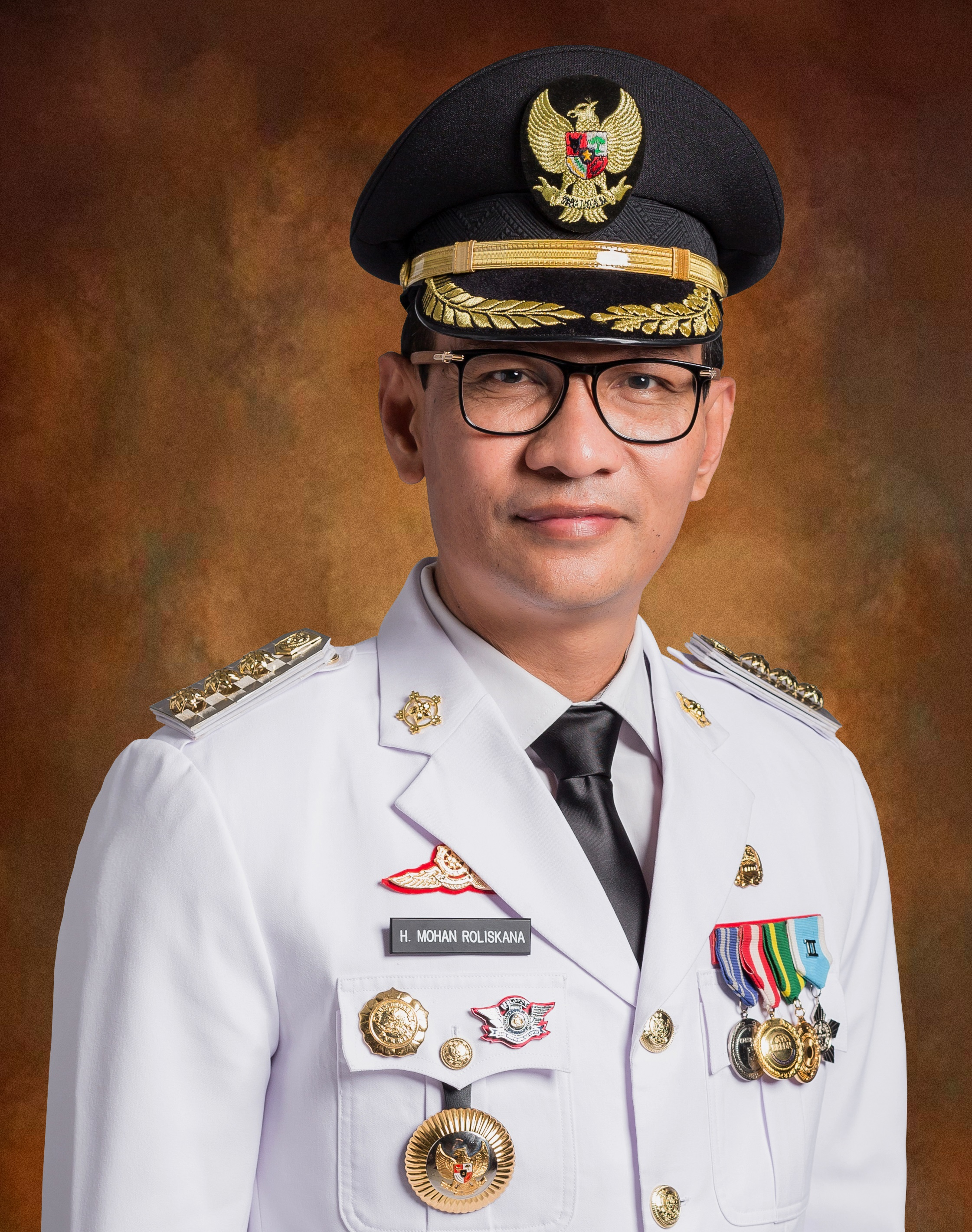
- Incumbent; Mohan Roliskana since 26 February 2021
- Term length: 5 years
- Inaugural holder: Lalu Mudjitahid
- Formation: 1978
- Website: Official website

Mayor of Mataram is the head of the second-level region who holds the government in Mataram together with the Vice Mayor and 40 members of the Mataram City Regional House of Representatives. The mayor and vice mayor of Mataram are elected through general elections held every 5 years. The first mayor of Mataram was Lalu Mudjitahid, who governed the city period from 1978 to 1989.

Before becoming an autonomous city, Mataram was an administrative city and was part of West Lombok Regency.

== List ==
The following is a list of the names of the Mayors of Mataram from time to time.

Administrative Mayor of Mataram
Num.	Portrait	Mayor	Beginning of office	End of Term	Political Party / Faction	Period	Note.	Vice mayor
1		Lalu Mudjitahid	1978	1989	Independent	1		N/A
2		Lalu Mas'ud	1989	1993	Independent	2		N/A
Mayor of Mataram
Num.	Portrait	Mayor	Beginning of office	End of Term	Political Party / Faction	Period	Note.	Vice mayor
(2)		Lalu Mas'ud	1993	1999	Independent	3		N/A
3		Mohammad Ruslan	1999	2004	Golkar	4		N/A
3		Mohammad Ruslan	2005	2010	Golkar	5 (2005)	(Note: The first Mayor of Mataram to be directly elected by the people of Mataram City.)	Ahyar Abduh
4		Ahyar Abduh	10 August 2010	10 August 2015	Golkar	6 (2010)		Mohan Roliskana
4		Ahyar Abduh	17 February 2016	17 February 2021	Golkar	7 (2015)		Mohan Roliskana
5		Mohan Roliskana	26 February 2021	20 February 2025	Golkar	8 (2020)		Mujiburrahman
5		Mohan Roliskana	20 February 2025	Incumbent	Golkar	9 (2024)		Mujiburrahman

== Temporary replacement ==
In the government stack, a regional head who submits himself to leave or temporarily resigns from his position to the central government, then the Minister of Home Affairs prepares a replacement who is a bureaucrat in the regional government or even a vice mayor, including when the mayor's position is in a transition period.

Portrait	Mayor	Party	Beginning	End	Duration	Period	Definitive	Ref.
	Putu Selly Andayani (Acting)	Independent	10 August 2015	17 February 2016	191 days	—	Transition (2015–2016)	
	Mohan Roliskana (Acting Officer)	Golkar	15 February 2018	23 June 2018	128 days	7 (2015)	Ahyar Abduh	(Note: Mayor Ahyar Abduh took campaign leave for the 2018 West Nusa Tenggara gubernatorial election from 15 February 2018 to 23 June 2018, the position of mayor was temporarily held by Acting Officer Mayor Mohan Roliskana.)
	Effendi Eko Saswito (Daily executive)	Independent	17 February 2021	26 February 2021	9 days	—	Transition (2021)	
	Tri Budiprayitno (Temporary Acting)	Independent	25 September 2024	23 November 2024	59 days	8 (2020)	Mohan Roliskana	(Note: Incumbent Mayor Mohan Roliskana and Vice Mayor Mujiburrahman is on campaign leave for the 2024 Mataram mayoral election from 25 September 2024 to 23 November 2024, the position of interim mayor is held by Temporary Acting Mayor Tri Budiprayitno.)

== See also ==
- Mataram
- List of incumbent regional heads and deputy regional heads in West Nusa Tenggara
