= Mohammad Ruslan =

Indonesian bureaucrat and politician (1948 – 2012)

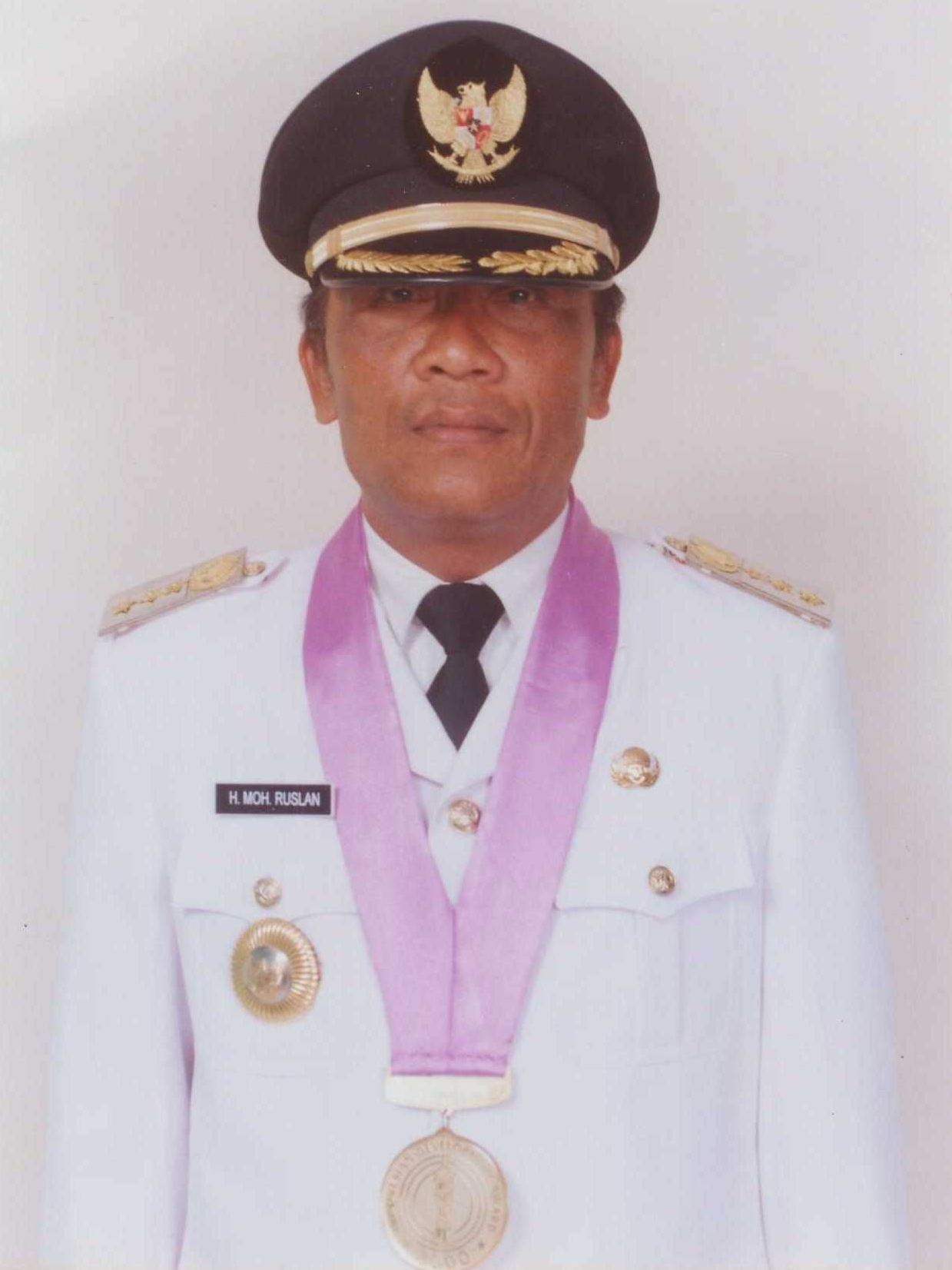

Mayor of Mataram
- In office 8 August 2005 – 10 August 2010
- Preceded by: Lalu Rifa'i (acting)
- Succeeded by: Ahyar Abduh
- In office 13 Desember 1999 – 13 Desember 2004
- Preceded by: Lalu Mas'ud
- Succeeded by: Lalu Rifa'i (acting)

Personal details
- Born: April 14, 1948 Mataram City, State of East Indonesia
- Died: February 26, 2012 (aged 63) Jakarta, Indonesia
- Education: University of Mataram

Mohammad Ruslan (14 April 1948 – 26 February 2012) was an Indonesian bureaucrat and politician from the Golkar party. He served as the mayor of Mataram, West Nusa Tenggara, from 1999 to 2004 and from 2005 to 2010. His first term saw a major riot in the city, and much of his tenure was focused on restoring public security in its aftermath.

== Early life ==
Mohammad Ruslan was born in West Lombok, a subdistrict of Mataram, on 14 April 1948. He was the son of Salsah Ramli and Mislah. Ruslan completed his elementary school at his birthplace in 1960, followed by middle school in 1963 and an economic senior high school in 1967. During his childhood, Ruslan was a popular volleyball player and joined provincial and national volleyball teams.

== Career ==
Against his parents' wishes, who wanted him to become a da'i or a religious scholar (tuan guru), Ruslan joined the provincial government as an employee on 1 September 1971. He became a civil servant on 1 February 1975 and was appointed as aide to the Governor of West Nusa Tenggara, Wasita Kusumah, on 23 May that year. He served for three years until 9 September 1978, shortly after Wasita Kusumah ended his gubernatorial tenure. He was then appointed as the chief of political affairs in the province's directorate of social political affairs on 14 November 1978. Since then, he held positions in a number of provincial government offices, including a stint as the head of the Mataram subdistrict. During his bureaucratic career, Ruslan studied law at the University of Mataram, and graduated in 1989. Ruslan was also active in Golkar, the government's party, and became the chair of the party in Mataram. For his role in Golkar, he was elected as the deputy speaker of the Mataram city council.

On 13 December 1999, Ruslan was installed as mayor of Mataram after winning an internal election by the city council. Early into his first term, riots occurred in Mataram, with churches being ransacked by mobs and shops being looted. The riots caused a halt on economic activity and transportation in the city. Ruslan then coordinated community-based security efforts in order to encourage shops in the city to reopen. After the unrests calmed down, a minor conflict broke out between the Taliwang village and the Sindu area in April 2000 in the city, which was mediated by Ruslan through a community meeting.

During his tenure, Ruslan implemented several controversial policies, including banning the performance of dangdut singer Inul Daratista as "a preventive act to defend the city from immorality" and prohibiting the spread of Shi'ism in 2003. Ruslan's mayoralship saw strong support from the local legislature, with the Indonesian Democratic Party of Struggle and the United Development Party supporting him in addition to Golkar, which allowed him to pass his controversial policies. Due to the riots in 2000, much of his first term was focused on restoring security against a backdrop of socio-ethnic tensions. To this end, Ruslan supported the formation of community security groups known as pamswakarsa. Education was also a major focus, with 40 percent of the municipal budget being spent on education in 2002. This spending was criticized, as much went to the construction of new "luxurious" school buildings instead of renovating existing schools.

Around 2003, driven by political motives to secure backing from Islamist parties, Ruslan backed a draft bill that sought to regulate morality by restricting alcohol sales, limiting women's mobility, and prohibiting fraternization between sexes. The draft bill faced sustained resistance from women’s rights groups and NGOs, who argued that the bill harms Lombok’s economy, especially its tourism sector, by promoting a restrictive social environment.

After declaring his candidacy for the 2005 mayoral elections, Ruslan shelved the bill for fear of alienating voters by aggressively pushing the legislation. With Mataram city council speaker Ahyar Abduh as his running mate, the pair won the election with 90,434 votes, or 53% of the total votes. Shortly after being installed for his second term on 8 August 2005, he resumed his support for the bill to repay his political debt to Islamist factions that had supported his campaign. At the end of his second term, in 2010 Ruslan initiated the construction of a central hospital for Mataram. Ahyar then succeeded him as mayor on 10 August 2010.

== Personal life ==
Ruslan was married to Baiq Sumarni from Central Lombok on 20 February 1972. The couple has three children. His oldest child, Mohan Roliskana, followed his footsteps and was elected as mayor in 2021 and 2024.

Ruslan died at the Harapan Kita heart hospital in Jakarta on 26 February 2012. His body was interred at Karang Bedil in Mataram. Mataram's central hospital was named after him in 2025.
