= List of incumbent regional heads and deputy regional heads in West Nusa Tenggara =

The following is an article about the list of Regional Heads and Deputy Regional Heads in 10 regencies/cities in West Nusa Tenggara who are currently still serving.

== List ==
Regency/ City	Photo of the Regent/ Mayor	Regent/ Mayor	Photo of Deputy Regent/ Mayor	Deputy Regent/ Mayor	Taking Office	End of Office (Planned)	Ref.
Bima; Regency List of Regents/Deputy Regents	pus	Ady Mahyudi	pus	Irfan	20 February 2025	20 February 2030	
Dompu; Regency List of Regents/Deputy Regents	pus	Bambang Firdaus	pus	Syirajuddin	20 February 2025	20 February 2030	
West Lombok; Regency List of Regents/Deputy Regents	pus	Lalu Ahmad Zaini	pus	Nurul Adha	20 February 2025	20 February 2030	
Central Lombok; Regency List of Regents/Deputy Regents	pus	Lalu Pathul Bahri	pus	Nursiah	20 February 2025	20 February 2030	
East Lombok; Regency List of Regents/Deputy Regents	pus	Haerul Warisin	pus	Edwin Hadiwijaya	20 February 2025	20 February 2030	
North Lombok; Regency List of Regents/Deputy Regents	pus	Najmul Akhyar	pus	Kusmalahadi Syamsuri	20 February 2025	20 February 2030	
Sumbawa; Regency List of Regents/Deputy Regents	pus	Syarafuddin Jarot	pus	Mohamad Ansori	20 February 2025	20 February 2030	
West Sumbawa; Regency List of Regents/Deputy Regents	pus	Amar Nurmansyah	pus	Hanipah Musyafirin	20 February 2025	20 February 2030	
Bima; City List of Mayors/Deputy mayors	pus	A. Rahman H. Abidin	pus	Feri Sofiyan	20 February 2025	20 February 2030	
Mataram; City List of Mayors/Deputy mayors	pus	Mohan Roliskana	pus	Mujiburrahman	20 February 2025	20 February 2030	

Notes

- "Commencement of office" is the inauguration date at the beginning or during the current term of office. For acting regents/mayors, it is the date of appointment or extension as acting regent/mayor.
- Based on the Constitutional Court decision Number 27/PUU-XXII/2024, the Governor and Deputy Governor, Regent and Deputy Regent, and Mayor and Deputy Mayor elected in 2020 shall serve until the inauguration of the Governor and Deputy Governor, Regent and Deputy Regent, and Mayor and Deputy Mayor elected in the 2024 national simultaneous elections as long as the term of office does not exceed 5 (five) years.

== See also ==
- West Nusa Tenggara
