= 2024 Mataram mayoral election =

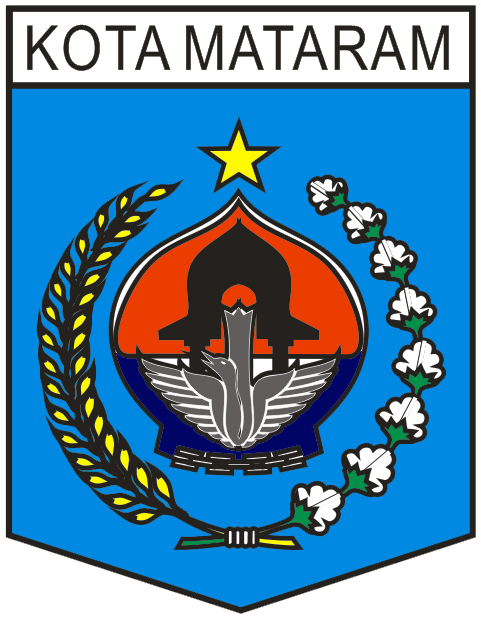
- 27 November 2024
- Turnout: 64.37%
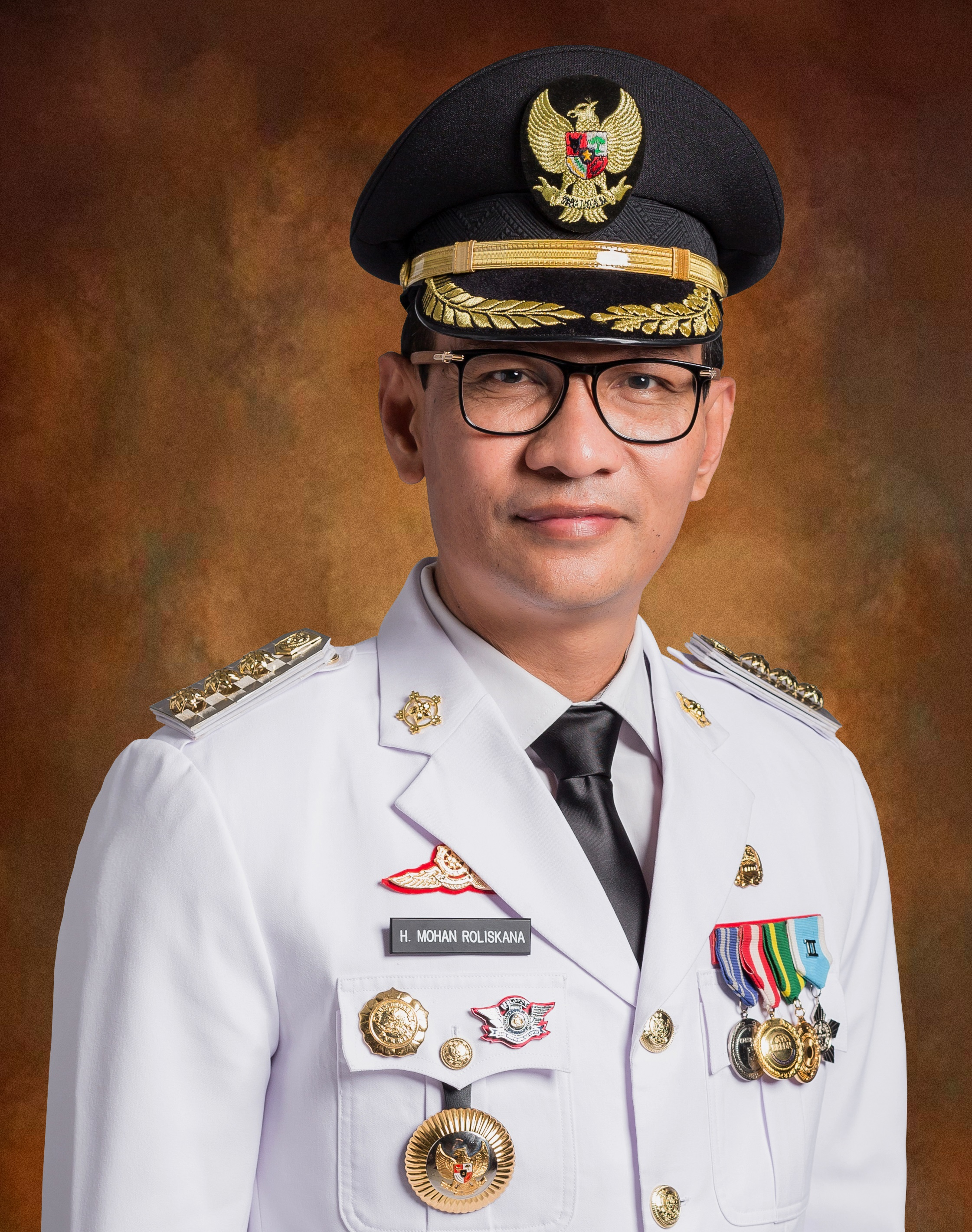

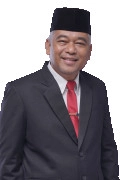
Candidate	Mohan Roliskana	Lalu Aria Dharma
Party	Golkar	PKS
Running mate	Mujiburrahman	Weis Arqurnain
Popular vote	112,946	86,432
Percentage	56.65%	43.35%
- Results by subdistrict
Mayor before election
Mohan Roliskana
Golkar
Elected mayor
Mohan Roliskana
Golkar

The 2024 Mataram mayoral election was held on 27 November 2024 as part of nationwide local elections to elect the mayor and vice mayor of Mataram, West Nusa Tenggara for a five-year term. The previous election was held in 2020. Incumbent mayor Mohan Roliskana from Golkar and his incumbent deputy Mujiburrahman defeated the Prosperous Justice Party-backed challenger Lalu Aria Dharma, securing a second term.

== Electoral system ==
The election, like other local elections in 2024, follow the first-past-the-post system where the candidate with the most votes wins the election, even if they do not win a majority. It is possible for a candidate to run uncontested, in which case the candidate is still required to win a majority of votes "against" an "empty box" option. Should the candidate fail to do so, the election will be repeated on a later date.

The Mataram City General Elections Commission (KPU) announced in September 2024 that the election would have 320,604 eligible voters. The cost of the election, combined with that of the concurrent gubernatorial election for the city, is budgeted at Rp 25 billion (~USD 1.6 million).

== Candidates ==
=== Mohan–Mujiburrahman ===
Incumbent mayor Mohan Roliskana, who is also chairman of Golkar's provincial branch in West Nusa Tenggara, had by July 2024 secured the endorsements from Golkar, PDI-P, Nasdem, Hanura, and PKB for his reelection and that of his vice-mayor Mujiburrahman. By the time of official candidate registration on 29 August, they had secured further endorsements from Gerindra, Demokrat, and seven further political parties without representation in the city council.

=== Aria–Weis ===
Contesting Roliskana's reelection was Lalu Aria Dharma, a civil servant who was secretary to Mataram's city council. In order to run in the election, he resigned from his civil servant position and joined the Prosperous Justice Party. His running mate, Weis Arqurnain, is the son of local United Development Party politician Muzihir. The ticket secured the endorsement of both parties, in addition to the National Mandate Party.

== Campaign ==
Two rounds of public debates were held between the candidates. KPU claimed that the first round, held on 16 October 2024, was watched by around 100 thousand people through KPU's social media, TVRI and RRI broadcasts, and other channels. The second round was held on 18 November 2024.

During the election campaign, the General Election Supervisory Agency received a report of one of the mayoral candidates distributing envelopes containing money in a campaign event. The investigation was later dropped, citing a lack of explicit requests to vote for the associated candidate.

== Results ==
Candidate	Running mate	Party	Votes	%
Mohan Roliskana	Mujiburrahman	Golkar	112,946	56.65
Lalu Aria Dharma	Weis Arqurnain	Prosperous Justice Party	86,432	43.35
Total			199,378	100.00
Valid votes			199,378	96.61
Invalid/blank votes			6,998	3.39
Total votes			206,376	100.00
Registered voters/turnout			320,604	64.37

The Mohan–Mujiburrahman ticket won more votes in five out of six administrative districts within Mataram.
