= Lalu Muhamad Iqbal =

Indonesian politician and diplomat

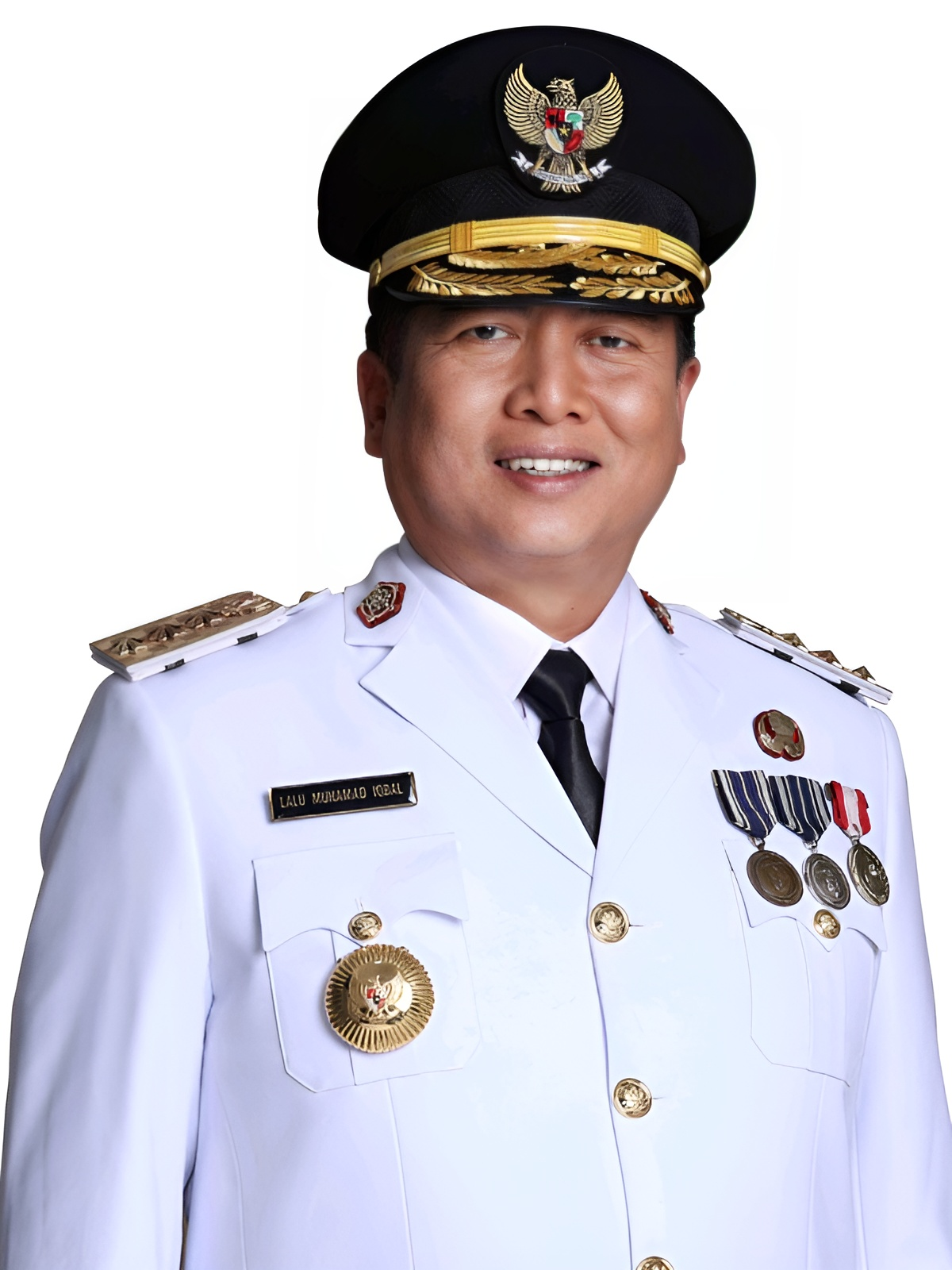
- Official portrait, 2025

9th Governor of West Nusa Tenggara
- Incumbent
- Assumed office 20 February 2025
- Vice Governor: Indah Dhamayanti Putri
- Preceded by: Zulkieflimansyah

17th Ambassador of Indonesia to Turkey
- In office 7 January 2019 – 26 June 2023
- President: Joko Widodo
- Preceded by: Wardana
- Succeeded by: Achmad Rizal Purnama

Personal details
- Born: 10 July 1972 (age 54) Praya, Central Lombok, West Nusa Tenggara, Indonesia
- Party: Gerindra (since 2024)
- Other political affiliations: KIM Plus (2024–present)
- Spouse: Sinta Agathia Soedjoko
- Children: 2
- Parents: Haji Lalu Maruf Misbach (father); Hajah Alimah (mother)
- Education: Muhammadiyah University of Yogyakarta (S.IP.); Gadjah Mada University (S.S.); Universitas Indonesia (M.I.P.); University of Bucharest (PhD)
- Occupation: Politician; diplomat

Lalu Muhamad Iqbal (born 10 July 1972) is an Indonesian politician and former diplomat who has served as the Governor of West Nusa Tenggara since 20 February 2025. Prior to his governorship, he was a career diplomat, notably serving as Indonesia's Ambassador to Turkey from 2019 to 2023 and as spokesperson for the Ministry of Foreign Affairs.

== Early life and education ==
Lalu Muhamad Iqbal was born on 10 July 1972 in Praya, Central Lombok, West Nusa Tenggara, Indonesia, to Lalu Maruf Misbach and Alimah. He completed his early education in Praya before attending Pondok Pesantren Modern Assalam in Solo, Central Java. Iqbal pursued higher education in International Relations at Muhammadiyah University of Yogyakarta and History at Universitas Gadjah Mada, followed by a master's degree in international relations from Universitas Indonesia in 2002, and a Ph.D. in politics from the University of Bucharest in 2005.

== Career ==
Iqbal began his career in 1998 as a diplomat with the Indonesian Ministry of Foreign Affairs. His postings include Secretary at the Indonesian Embassy in Bucharest (2001–2005), Counsellor at the Embassy in Vienna (2008–2012), and Ambassador to Turkey (2019–unknown). He also served as the Ministry's spokesperson, handling significant diplomatic incidents such as the release of Indonesian citizens kidnapped in the Philippines.

== Political career ==
In 2024, Iqbal entered politics, running for Governor of West Nusa Tenggara with the support of the Gerindra Party and a coalition of parties. Paired with Indah Damayanti Putri as his running mate, he won the election held on 27 November 2024 and was inaugurated on 20 February 2025, succeeding Zulkieflimansyah.

== Personal life ==
Iqbal is married and has two children.
