= Tanjung Ringgit =

Headland in Indonesia

Coordinates: 8°51′30″S 116°33′11″E

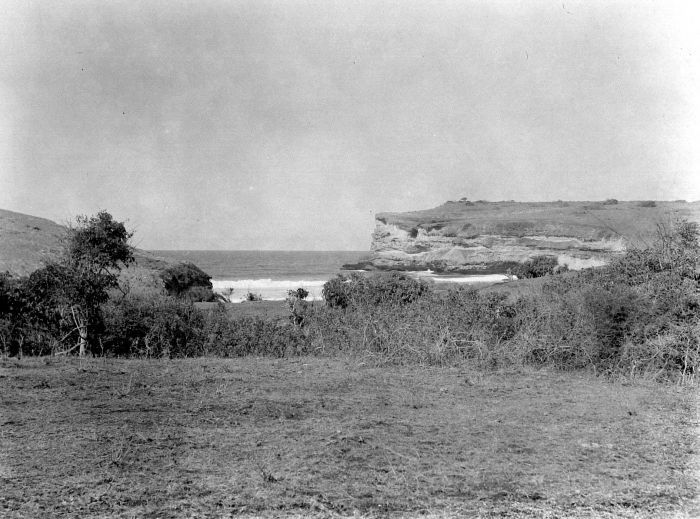
View of Tanjung Ringgit (1934–1938)

Tanjung Ringgit is a cape located on the eastern coast line of Lombok Island, Indonesia.

The area is surrounded by conserved forest owned by the Ministry of Forestry. Its inhabitants are mainly farmers.

== Tourism ==
Tanjung Ringgit has white sand beaches and a long white rock cliff where one can find old cave used by Japanese soldiers during World War II.

Tanjung Ringgit is a 2 1/2 hour drive from Mataram, Lombok's main city.
