= The Lombok Times =

- Type: Monthly newspaper
- Format: Tabloid
- Owner: PT Cikamedia publications
- Publisher: Ni Wayan Novriyanti
- Editor: Ferre Horvath
- Founded: 2003
- Headquarters: Mataram, Indonesia
- Website: www.lomboktimes.com

The Lombok Times is an English-language newspaper which was founded in 2003 as an information medium for the growing English language speaking community, which consists of both visiting tourists and foreign expatriates in the Indonesian provinces of West Nusa Tenggara and Bali.

With the support of the Nusa Tenggara Barat Government and various local business associations, the paper has become a prime, independent and non-political source for local news.

Although the name of the paper suggests the paper covers only the island of Lombok, in reality, the publication covers both provinces, both in news coverage and readership.

The Lombok Times began publication in November 2003 from a small office in the capital of Lombok, Mataram, with an initial circulation of 1,500 copies.

Since its first publication, The Lombok Times has been the largest English language newspaper in both Bali and West Nusa Tenggara. In 2005, its circulation reached five thousand copies, to grow into a fifteen thousand copies in 2008. With distribution on various airlines, hotels and touristic areas, readership reaches an estimated fifty thousand per issue.

The newspaper is a combination of both regional news and paid advertisements promoting local tourist attractions. The Lombok Times is distributed at no charge.

From 1 January 2009, The Lombok Times is published by Cikamedia Publications.
