= Mesir Suryadi =

Indonesian politician (1943–2023)

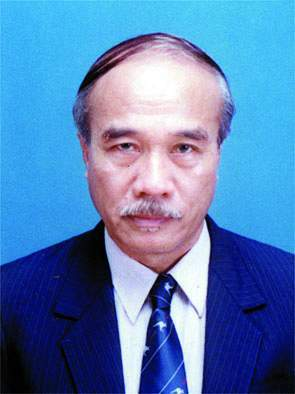

Member of the People's Representative Council
- In office 1 October 2004 – 1 October 2009
- Constituency: West Nusa Tenggara

Member of the People's Consultative Assembly
- In office 1 October 1999 – 1 October 2009
- Parliamentary group: Regional Delegates (until 2004); Golkar (from 2004)
- Constituency: West Nusa Tenggara
- In office 1 October 1987 – 1 February 1991
- Parliamentary group: Regional Delegates
- Constituency: West Nusa Tenggara

Speaker of the West Nusa Tenggara Regional People's Representative Council
- In office 1987 – April 1990

Personal details
- Born: 17 February 1943 East Lombok, Japanese-occupied Dutch East Indies
- Died: 26 January 2023 (aged 79) Banten, Indonesia
- Party: Golkar
- Spouse: Endang Herawati
- Children: 4
- Education: University of Mataram (S.H.)

Mesir Suryadi (17 February 1943 – 26 January 2023) was an Indonesian politician from West Nusa Tenggara. He was a member of the People's Representative Council from 2004 until 2009. Before being elected to the People's Representative Council, Mesir was a student activist from the Muslim Students' Association and was heavily involved in local politics in West Nusa Tenggara, with his highest office being the province's parliament speaker from 1987 until 1990.

== Early life and education ==
Mesir was born on 17 February 1943 in East Lombok, during the Japanese occupation of the Dutch East Indies. His father, Abdul Muin, worked as a village head, and his mother, Darwati, was a housewife. He studied at a junior high school in East Lombok from 1956 until 1959 and moved to Mataram to continue his education at a high school from 1959 until 1962.

Upon finishing his secondary education, Mesir attended a teachers' school. After graduating, he began studying law at the University of Mataram in 1964. He was involved in the creation of the West Nusa Tenggara branch of the Muslim Students' Association (HMI), which at that time was established to counter the influence of communist student organisations.

At that time, West Nusa Tenggara experienced a severe food crisis due to the mishandling of droughts by the government. As a leading member of the HMI, Mesir helped organize social services by HMI to provide food to the starving populace and organizing rallies against the incumbent governor, Ruslan Tjakraningrat. Ruslan was dismissed from his position in 1966 for failing to handle the starvation and Mesir became HMI's chairman in West Nusa Tenggara the following year.

Mesir was also involved in various student organizations inside the university. He was the commander of the university's student regiment from 1967 until 1971 and a leading member in the province's National Committee of Indonesian Youth and the university's student senate. He graduated from the university with a law degree in 1979.

== Career ==
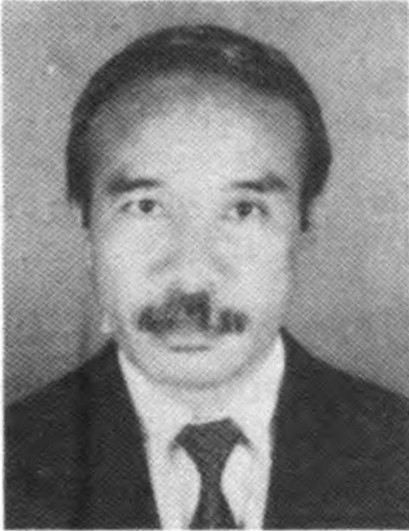
Suryadi as Speaker of the West Nusa Tenggara Regional Council, 1987

Mesir began his career as a teacher during his studies at the University of Mataram. After finishing his law education, Mesir worked at various private companies. He joined Golkar around the same time as his graduation from the university and became a member of the party's multimedia bureau. In the 1982 elections, he was nominated by the party for a seat in the province's regional representative council. He successfully secured a seat and became the deputy speaker. Two years later, he was appointed the deputy chairman of Golkar in West Nusa Tenggara.

Mesir was re-elected for a second term in the West Nusa Tenggara Regional People's Representative Council. He became the council's speaker in his second term and also became an ex officio member of the People's Consultative Assembly. However, in early 1990 Mesir was stripped of his membership in the regional people's representative council by Golkar due to alleged "violation of organizational discipline". Mesir was initially given an option of voluntary resignation, but he refused, stating that he would always feel guilty if he did so. Several months later, in 1991 he was dismissed from his ex officio membership in the People's Consultative Assembly. Mesir's reprimand was protested by various organizations in West Nusa Tenggara, including HMI.

Mesir returned to politics following the fall of Suharto's regime in 1998. He returned to his old post of the deputy chairman of Golkar in West Nusa Tenggara and became the chairman of Golkar in West Nusa Tenggara the next year. Mesir was elected as a member of the West Nusa Tenggara Regional People's Representative Council for the third time in the 1999 elections and served briefly before being sent to Jakarta as a regional delegate for West Nusa Tenggara in the People's Consultative Assembly.

In 2003, Mesir was nominated as a candidate for the Governor of West Nusa Tenggara, facing incumbent governor Harun Al-Rasyid and regional parliament speaker Lalu Serinata, with both coming from Golkar. Mesir was defeated by a significant margin by Lalu Serinata. The next year, Mesir was replaced as chairman of Golkar in West Nusa Tenggara by Lalu Serinata. Mesir was viewed by Lalu Serinata's supporters as his political enemy. When Lalu Serinata was arrested for corruption in late 2008, his supporters accused Mesir of orchestrating the arrest and stormed his personal residence.

After losing his position within the party's West Nusa Tenggara branch, Mesir was nominated as a member of the People's Representative Council by Golkar in the 2004 elections. He obtained 42,665 votes and obtained a seat in the council. Mesir was seated in the eighth commission of the People's Representative Council, which handles religious and social affairs. He also became a member of the budgeting committee from 2004 until 2007 and the household committee from 2007 until 2009. Mesir was involved in the formulation of various laws, such as the law on state ministries and advisory councils and the law on social welfare.

Mesir retired from politics after his term in the People's Representative Council ended in 2009. In 2011, he became the chairman of West Nusa Tenggara's Indonesian Red Cross Society and served in the position until 2016. He died on 26 January 2023 at the Soekarno–Hatta International Airport during a return trip to West Nusa Tenggara. He was buried the following day.
