= 2018 West Nusa Tenggara gubernatorial election =

Local election in Indonesia

- 27 June 2018
- Turnout: 73.8%
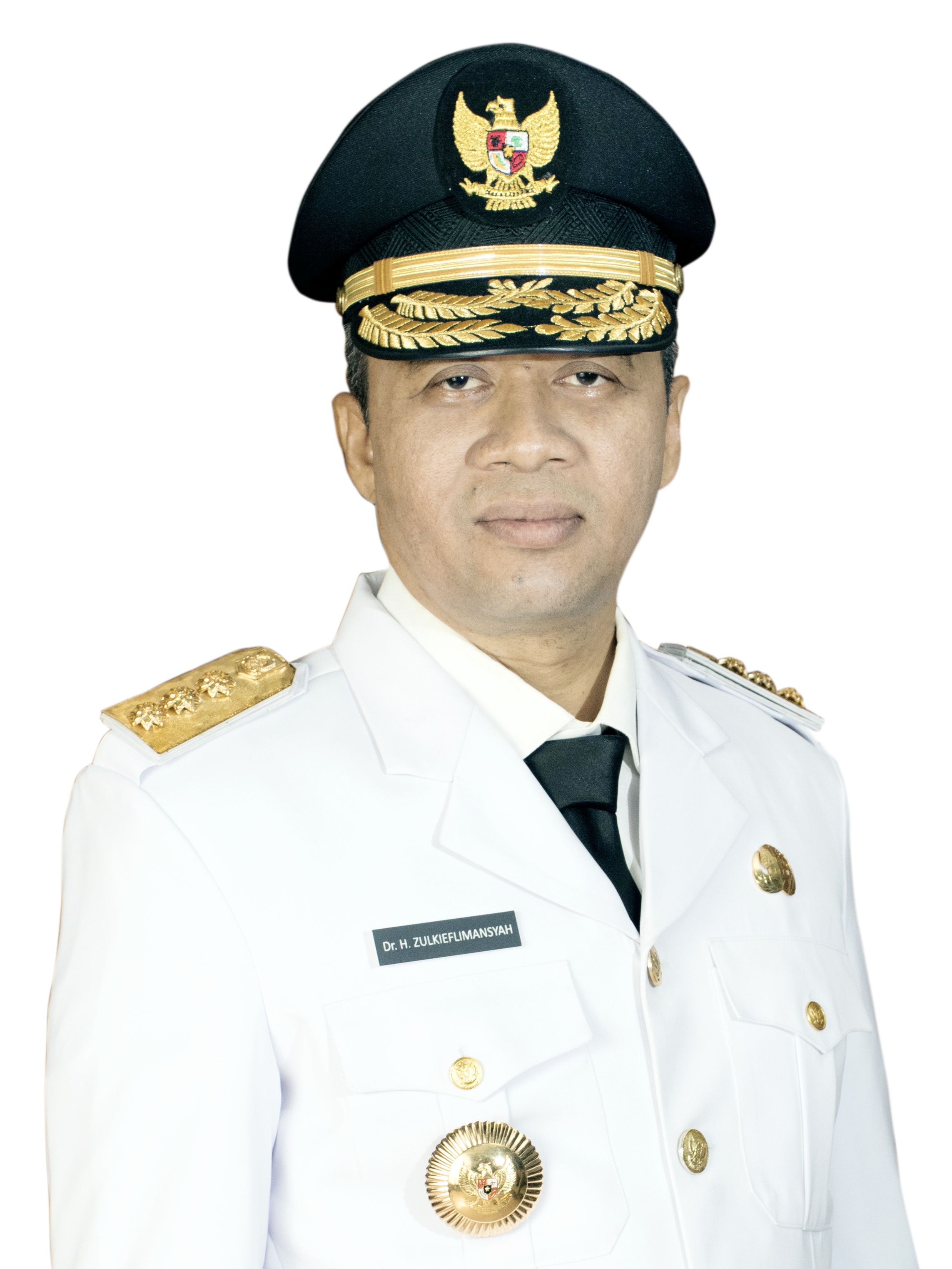

Nominee	Zulkieflimansyah	M. Suhaili F.T.
Party	PKS	Golkar
Running mate	Sitti Rohmi Djalilah	Muhammad Amin
Popular vote	811,945	674,602
Percentage	31.80%	26.42%
Nominee	Ahyar Abduh	Ali Bin Dahlan
Party	Gerindra	Independent
Running mate	Mori Hanafi	Lalu Gede Sakti A.M.
Popular vote	637,048	430,007
Percentage	24.95%	16.84

The 2018 West Nusa Tenggara gubernatorial election took place on 27 June 2018 as part of the simultaneous local elections. It was held to elect the governor of West Nusa Tenggara alongside their deputy, whilst members of the provincial council (Dewan Perwakilan Rakyat Daerah) will be re-elected in 2019.

With incumbent Muhammad Zainul Majdi meeting his term limits, People's Representative Council member Zulkieflimansyah came ahead in the four-candidate race, defeating regents of Central Lombok and East Lombok Mohammad Suhaili Fadhil Thahir and Ali Bin Dahlan, alongside Mataram mayor Ahyar Abduh, winning 31.8 percent of votes.

== Timeline ==
Registration for party-backed candidates were opened between 8 and 10 January 2018, while independent candidates were required to register between 22 and 26 November 2017. The numerical order of the candidates were determined on 13 February through a lottery. The campaigning period commenced between 15 February and 24 June, with a three-day election silence before voting on 27 June.

== Candidates ==
#	Candidate	Positions	Parties
1	M. Suhaili FT	Regent of Central Lombok	Golkar; Nasdem; PKB
1	Muhammad Amin	Incumbent Vice Governor	Golkar; Nasdem; PKB
2	Ahyar Abduh	Mayor of Mataram	Gerindra; PAN; PPP; PDI-P; PBB; Hanura
2	Mori Hanafi	Deputy Speaker of DPRD NTB	Gerindra; PAN; PPP; PDI-P; PBB; Hanura
3	Zulkieflimansyah	Member of DPR	Demokrat; PKS
3	Siti Rohmi Jalilah		Demokrat; PKS
4	Ali bin Dahlan	Regent of East Lombok	Independent
4	Gede Wirasakti AM		Independent

== Results ==
No	Candidate	Votes	%
1	Suhaili/Amin	674,602	26.42
2	Ahyar/Hanafi	637,048	24,95
3	Zul/Sitti	811,945	31.80
4	Dachlan/Murni	430,007	16.84
Total votes		2,553,602	
Invalid votes		84,361	
Turnout		2,637,963	73.81
Source: KPU
