= 2024 West Nusa Tenggara gubernatorial election =

- 27 November 2024
- Turnout: 74.23% (▲1.05pp)
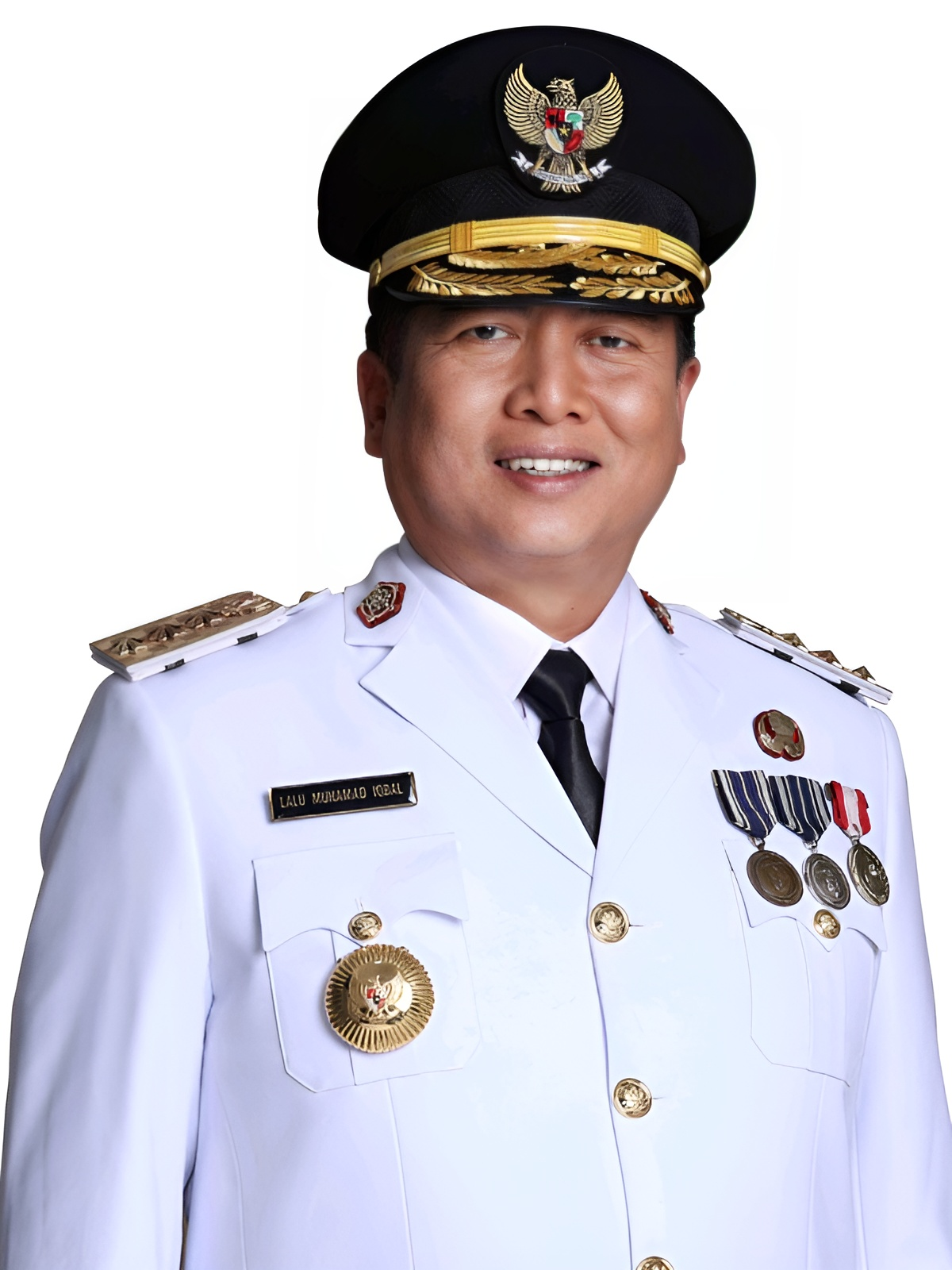

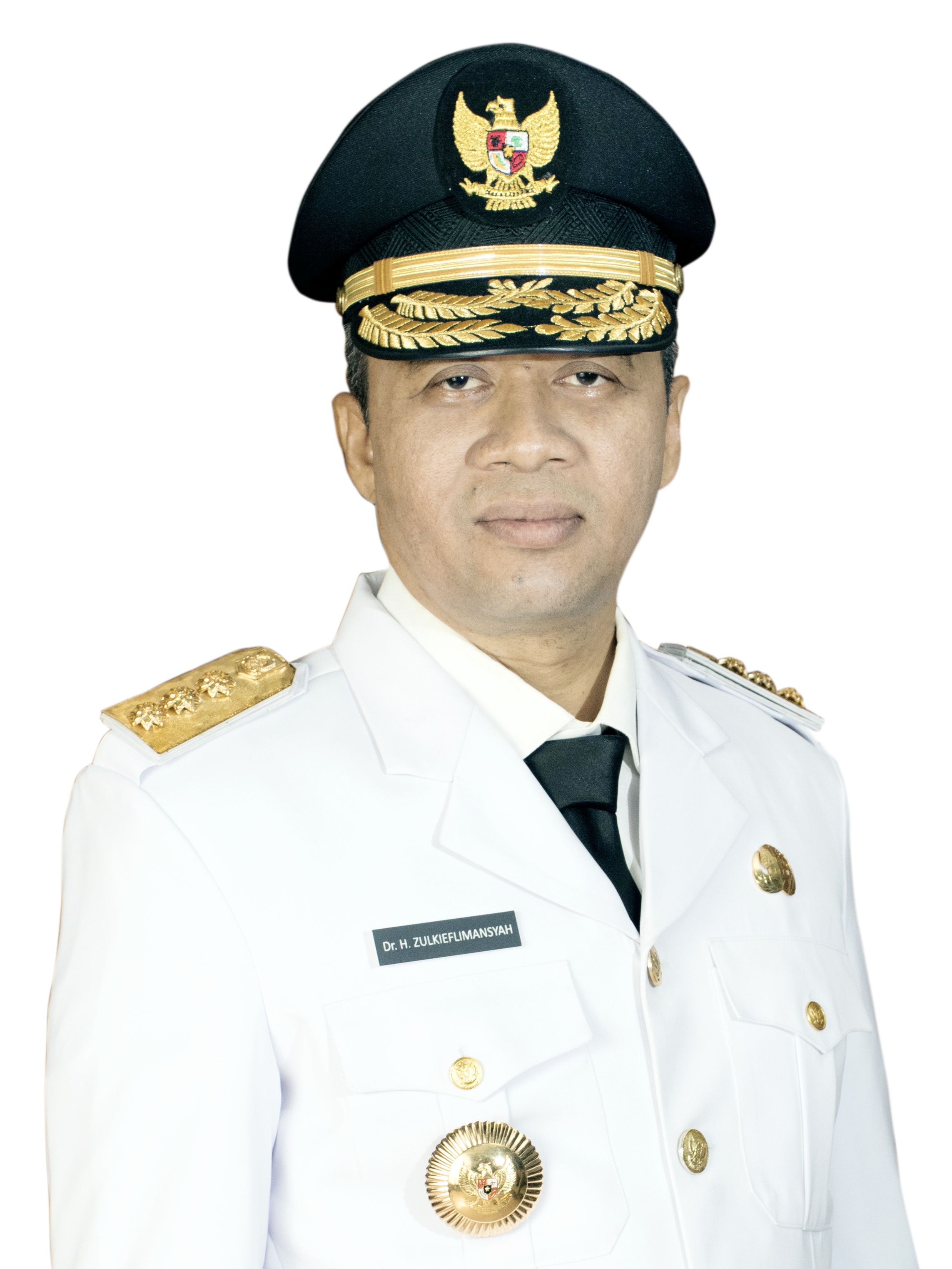

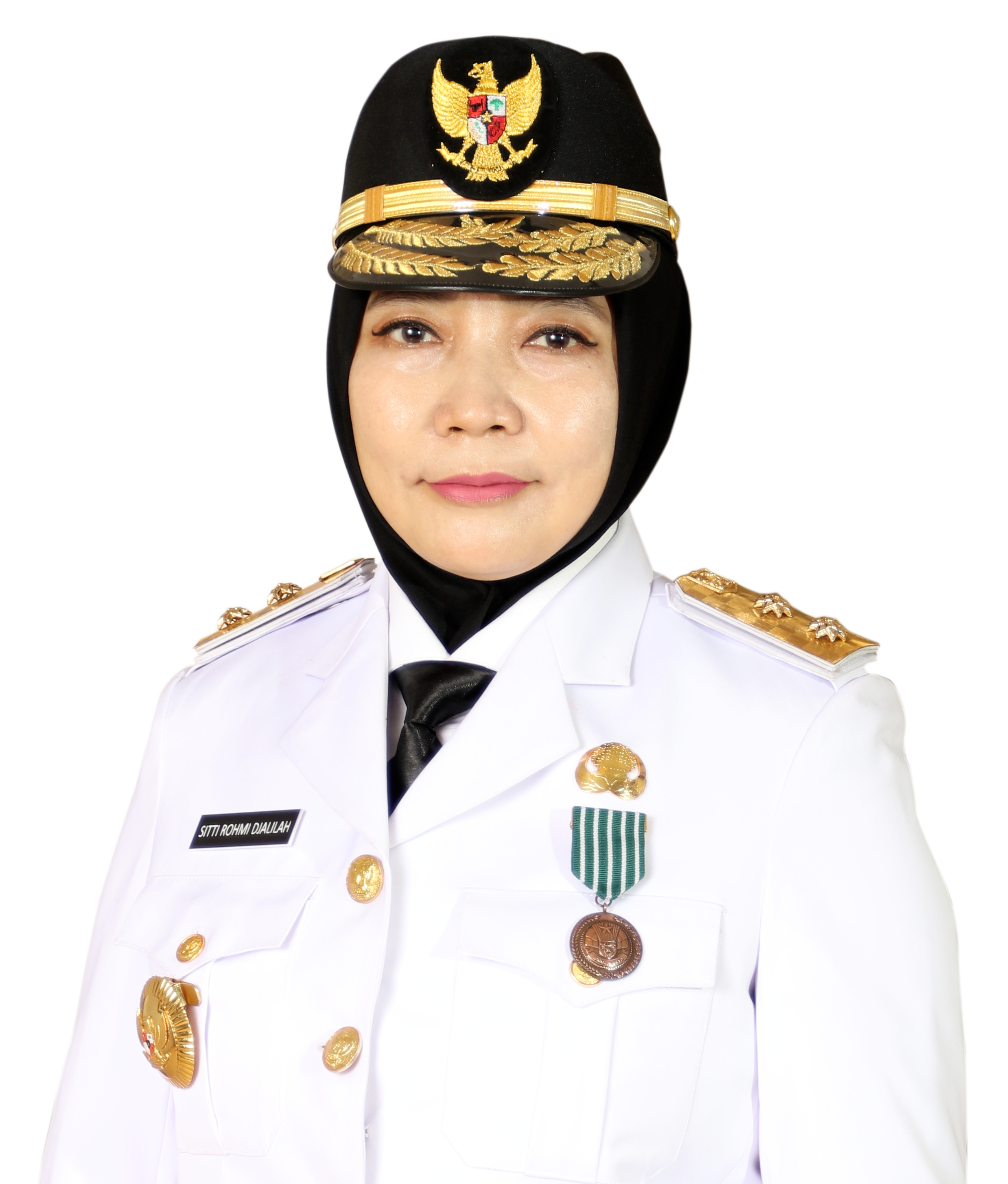
Candidate	Lalu Muhamad Iqbal	Zulkieflimansyah	Sitti Rohmi Djalilah
Party	Gerindra	PKS	Perindo
Alliance	KIM Plus	–	–
Running mate	Indah Dhamayanti Putri	Suhaili Fadhil Thohir	W. Musyafirin
Popular vote	1,163,194	887,791	775,937
Percentage	41.15%	31.40%	27.45%
- Results map by district
Governor before election
Lalu Gita Ariadi (acting)
Independent
Elected Governor
Lalu Muhamad Iqbal
Gerindra

The 2024 West Nusa Tenggara gubernatorial election was held on 27 November 2024 as part of nationwide local elections to elect the governor and vice governor of West Nusa Tenggara for a five-year term. The previous election was held in 2018. Lalu Muhamad Iqbal, a former ambassador to Turkey, won the election with 41% of the vote. Former Governor Zulkieflimansyah of the Prosperous Justice Party (PKS) placed second with 31%, and former Vice Governor Sitti Rohmi Djalilah of the Perindo Party received 27%.

== Electoral system ==
The election, like other local elections in 2024, follow the first-past-the-post system where the candidate with the most votes wins the election, even if they do not win a majority. It is possible for a candidate to run uncontested, in which case the candidate is still required to win a majority of votes "against" an "empty box" option. Should the candidate fail to do so, the election will be repeated on a later date.

== Candidates ==
According to electoral regulations, in order to qualify for the election, candidates were required to secure support from a political party or a coalition of parties controlling 13 seats (20 percent of all seats) in the West Nusa Tenggara Regional House of Representatives (DPRD). As no parties won 13 or more seats in the 2024 legislative election, coalitions between political parties are required in order to nominate a candidate. Candidates may alternatively demonstrate support to run as an independent in form of photocopies of identity cards, which in West Nusa Tenggara's case corresponds to 333,055 copies. No independent candidates registered with the General Elections Commission (KPU) prior to the set deadline.

=== Declared ===
These are candidates who have been allegedly delegated by political parties endorsing for gubernatorial election:

Candidate from PKS and Golkar
Zulkieflimansyah	Suhaili Fadhil Thohir
for Governor	for Vice Governor
Governor of West Nusa Tenggara (2018–2023)	Regent of Central Lombok (2010–2021)
Parties
18 / 65 (28%) PKS (8 seats); Demokrat (6 seats); Nasdem (4 seats)

Candidate from Perindo and PDI-P
Sitti Rohmi Djalilah	W. Musyafirin
for Governor	for Vice Governor
Vice Governor of West Nusa Tenggara (2018–2023)	Regent of West Sumbawa (2016–present)
Parties
13 / 65 (20%) PKB (6 seats); PDI-P (4 seats); Perindo (3 seats)

Candidate from Gerindra and Golkar
Lalu Muhamad Iqbal	Indah Dhamayanti Putri
for Governor	for Vice Governor
Special Staff for Diplomatic Infrastructure Strengthening (2023–present)	Regent of Bima (2016–present)
Parties
34 / 65 (52%) Golkar (10 seats); Gerindra (10 seats); PPP (7 seats); PAN (4 seats); PBB (2 seats); Hanura (1 seat)

=== Potential ===
The following are individuals who have either been publicly mentioned as a potential candidate by a political party in the DPRD, publicly declared their candidacy with press coverage, or considered as a potential candidate by media outlets:

- Zulkieflimansyah (PKS), previous governor.
- Sitti Rohmi Djalilah (PDI-P), previous vice governor (as either the gubernatorial or vice gubernatorial candidate).

- W. Musyafirin (PDI-P), regent of West Sumbawa (as Rohmi's running mate).

- Lalu Gita Ariadi, incumbent acting governor and provincial secretary.
- Suhaili Fadhil Thohir (Golkar), former two-term regent of Central Lombok.
- M. Sukiman Azmy, former two-term regent of East Lombok.
- Lalu Muhammad Iqbal, former Ambassador of Indonesia to Turkey.

== Political map ==
Following the 2024 Indonesian legislative election, twelve political parties are represented in the West Nusa Tenggara DPRD:

Political parties	Seat count
Party of Functional Groups (Golkar)	10 / 65
Great Indonesia Movement Party (Gerindra)	10 / 65
Prosperous Justice Party (PKS)	8 / 65
United Development Party (PPP)	7 / 65
Democratic Party (Demokrat)	6 / 65
National Awakening Party (PKB)	6 / 65
Indonesian Democratic Party of Struggle (PDI-P)	4 / 65
NasDem Party	4 / 65
National Mandate Party (PAN)	4 / 65
Perindo Party	3 / 65
Crescent Star Party (PBB)	2 / 65
People's Conscience Party (Hanura)	1 / 65

== Results ==
Candidate	Running mate	Party	Votes	%
Lalu Muhamad Iqbal	Indah Dhamayanti Putri	Gerindra Party	1,163,194	41.15
Zulkieflimansyah	Suhaili Fadhil Thohir	Prosperous Justice Party	887,791	31.40
Sitti Rohmi Djalilah	W. Musyafirin	Perindo Party	775,937	27.45
Total			2,826,922	100.00
Valid votes			2,826,922	96.06
Invalid/blank votes			115,920	3.94
Total votes			2,942,842	100.00
Registered voters/turnout			3,964,325	74.23
Source: KPU

Candidate vote share by district
Rohmi–Firin

Zulkiefli–Suhaili

Iqbal–Dinda
