= University of Mataram =

Public university in Indonesia

- Universitas Mataram
- Type: Public
- Established: October 1, 1962
- Accreditation: Baik Sekali (Excellent) Ministry of Education, Culture, Research, and Technology
- Affiliations: ASAIHL
- Rector: Prof. Ir. Bambang Hari Kusumo, M.Agr.St., Ph.D
- Location: Jl. Majapahit No. 62 Mataram, Nusa Tenggara Barat Indonesia, Mataram, West Nusa Tenggara, 83125, Indonesia
- Colors
- Nickname: UNRAM
- Website: www.unram.ac.id
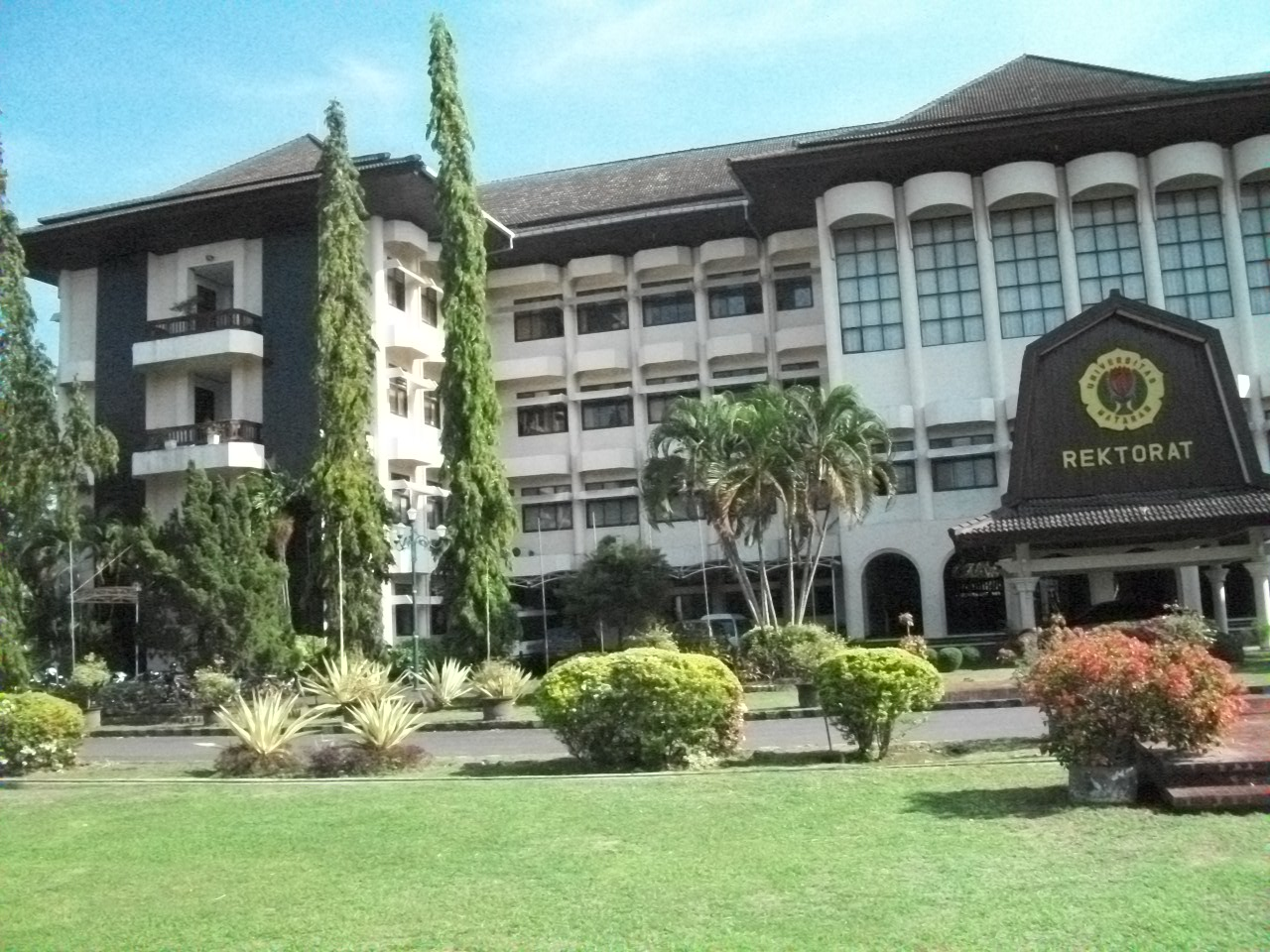

The University of Mataram (Indonesian: Universitas Mataram) (Unram) is a public university in Mataram, West Nusa Tenggara, Indonesia. It was established on October 1, 1962. Its current rector is Prof. Ir. Bambang Hari Kusumo, M.Agr.St., PhD.

The university faculty has 1,339 members, including 86 professors. The university serves an approximate student body of 26,000 and more. The University offers a comprehensive range of academic programs, spanning vocational, diploma, undergraduate, postgraduate, and professional levels. As a research-intensive university with international competitiveness, the University of Mataram also provides various international programs. It houses 72 study programs, 13 international classes, and is organized into 10 faculties.

== History ==
The University of Mataram (UNRAM) is organized under the Ministry of Education, domiciled in Mataram City, West Nusa Tenggara Province. The establishment process of forming the Preparatory Committee for State Universities in Mataram is chaired by the Head of Level I NTB Region governor, R. Ar. Moh. Ruslan Tjakraningrat. The two proposals from this Preparatory Body are the establishment of the Faculty of Economics, the Faculty of Animal Husbandry, and the Faculty which produces agronomists. Then, it came up with an alternative university name, Sangkarengan University or Mataram University. Based on the proposal of the Preparatory Board, the Universitas Mataram was established on November 3, 1962. However, one year after the decision, there were no activities that marked the functioning of the university, so at the request of the Governor, on November 17, 1963, the Sangkareang Education Foundation opened the Faculty of Economics, which was expected to become one of the faculties at the State University in Mataram. Then, on December 7, 1963, the Preparatory Board for the Establishment of Mataram University was disbanded because its task was declared complete. On December 19, 1963, the Sangkareang Education Foundation handed over the Faculty of Economics and 41 students to the Governor for further inauguration by the Minister of PTIP. At this time, the State University in Mataram officially started its activities. On this basis, in the early days, the Universitas Mataram commemorated the Dies Natalis on December 19. However, after a series of establishment processes were re-examined, it was determined that the Dies Natalis falls on October 1.

In 1967, Universitas Mataram established three faculties at once, namely the Faculty of Agriculture (1967), the Faculty of Animal Husbandry (1967) and the Faculty of Law (1967). In its development, Universitas Mataram had nine faculties until the 2011/2012 academic year. The four faculties formed after the Faculty of Law were the Faculty of Teacher Training and Education (FKIP) on April 25, 1981. Then, the Faculty of Engineering was established based on the change in the Mataram Technical College (STTM) status to the Civil Engineering Study Program on November 8, 1991. On October 21, 1993, the Faculty of Engineering was officially established at the Universitas Mataram. The last three faculties established were the Faculty of Mathematics and Natural Sciences (FMIPA) and the Faculty of Medicine, on August 25, 2007 and August 25, 2007, respectively, and the Faculty of Food Technology and Agroindustry on February 4, 2012.

== Logo and Philosophy ==
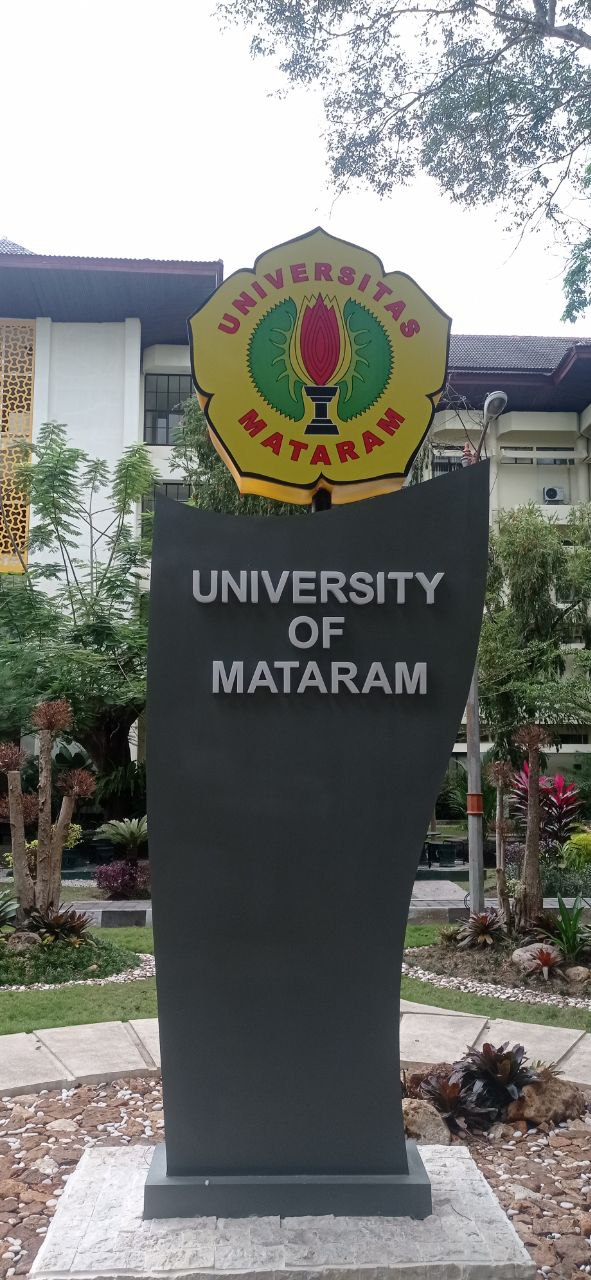
The Logo of UNRAM at the Garden

The UNRAM emblem is composed of a golden lotus blossom with five petals (Pantone #FFD700), encircled by a black outline. The words 'UNIVERSITAS' and 'MATARAM' are inscribed in red within the flower. Two dark green lotus leaves, each with 31 serrated edges and five light green veins, are positioned below the flower. A pink lotus bud, bordered in black, rests on a two-tiered black pedestal along with the leaves.

Logo Symbolism:

- Five-petaled lotus: Represents Pancasila, the philosophical foundation of Indonesian education.
- Red inscription 'UNIVERSITAS MATARAM': Symbolizes the university's resolute commitment to higher education.
- Two dark green leaves with 31 serrations each: Alludes to the university's founding year.
- Ten light green veins: Symbolizes the month of the university's re-establishment.
- Pink lotus bud: Represents the cultivation of spirituality and knowledge within the university.
- Two-tiered black pedestal: Signifies UNRAM as a source of life and knowledge.
- Black color: Symbolizes the nature of knowledge itself.
- Two tiers: Represent the unification of Lombok and Sumbawa islands, forming West Nusa Tenggara.
- Black outline around the bud: Symbolizes the enduring purity of knowledge.
- Golden color: Represents prosperity.

== Facilities ==
=== Library ===
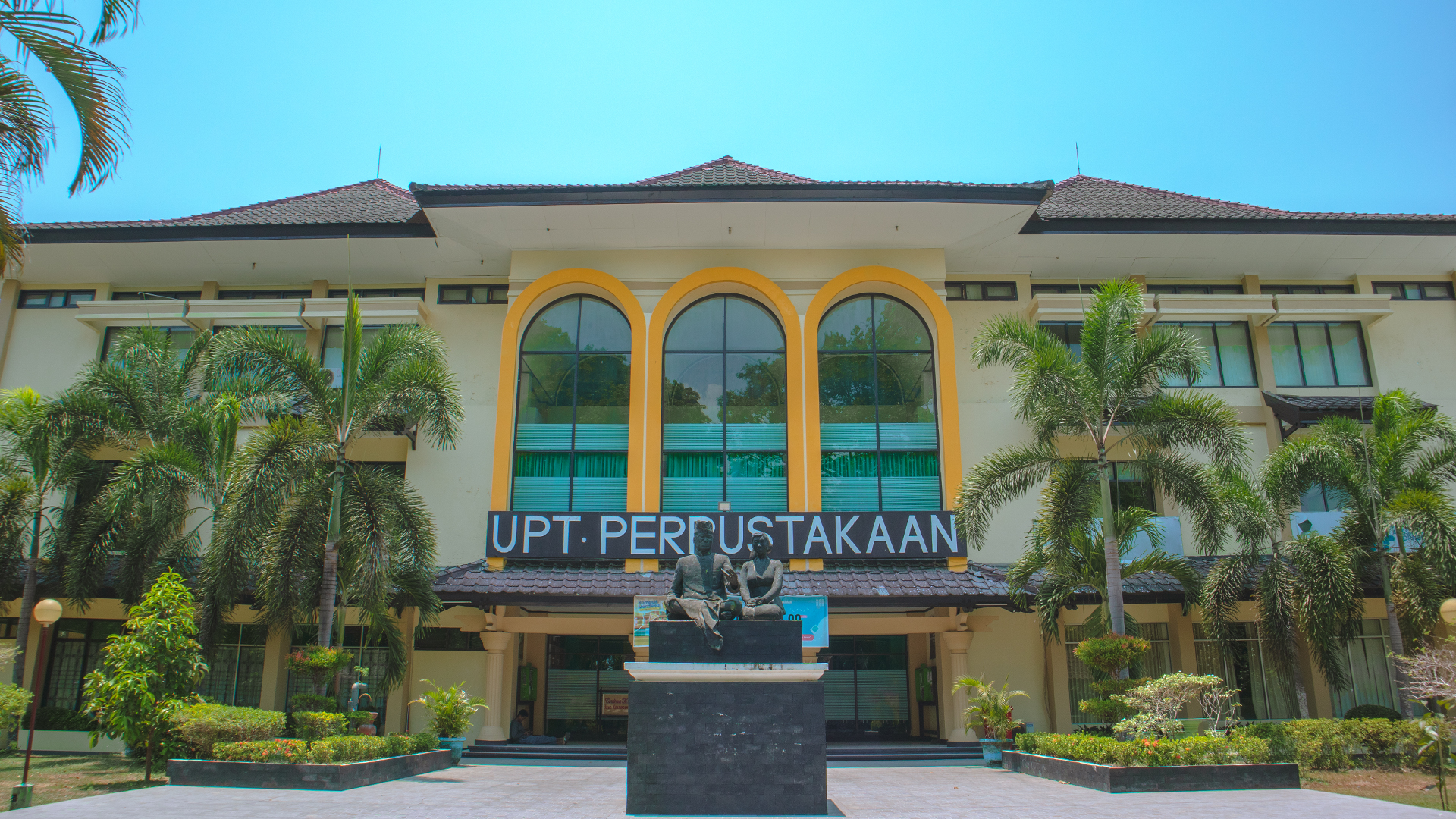
Front view of University of Mataram Library

The University of Mataram Library has continuously strived to improve its services to the academic community. It is fully aware that the existence of the university library is solely to provide scientific information services to all academic members and to serve as one of the pillars supporting the strong educational and academic system of the University of Mataram.Therefore, in 2014, a new chapter in the arrangement and development of the library began. Almost all aspects received proportionate attention, starting from:

- the redesign of the lobby interior
- the circulation service area
- the arrangement of the multimedia room
- the launch of an internet cafe for students
- the creation of study corners
- the arrangement of the front garden of the library with two gazebos as an effort to create a comfortable space for users to stay in the library.

=== Masjid Baabul Hikmah ===
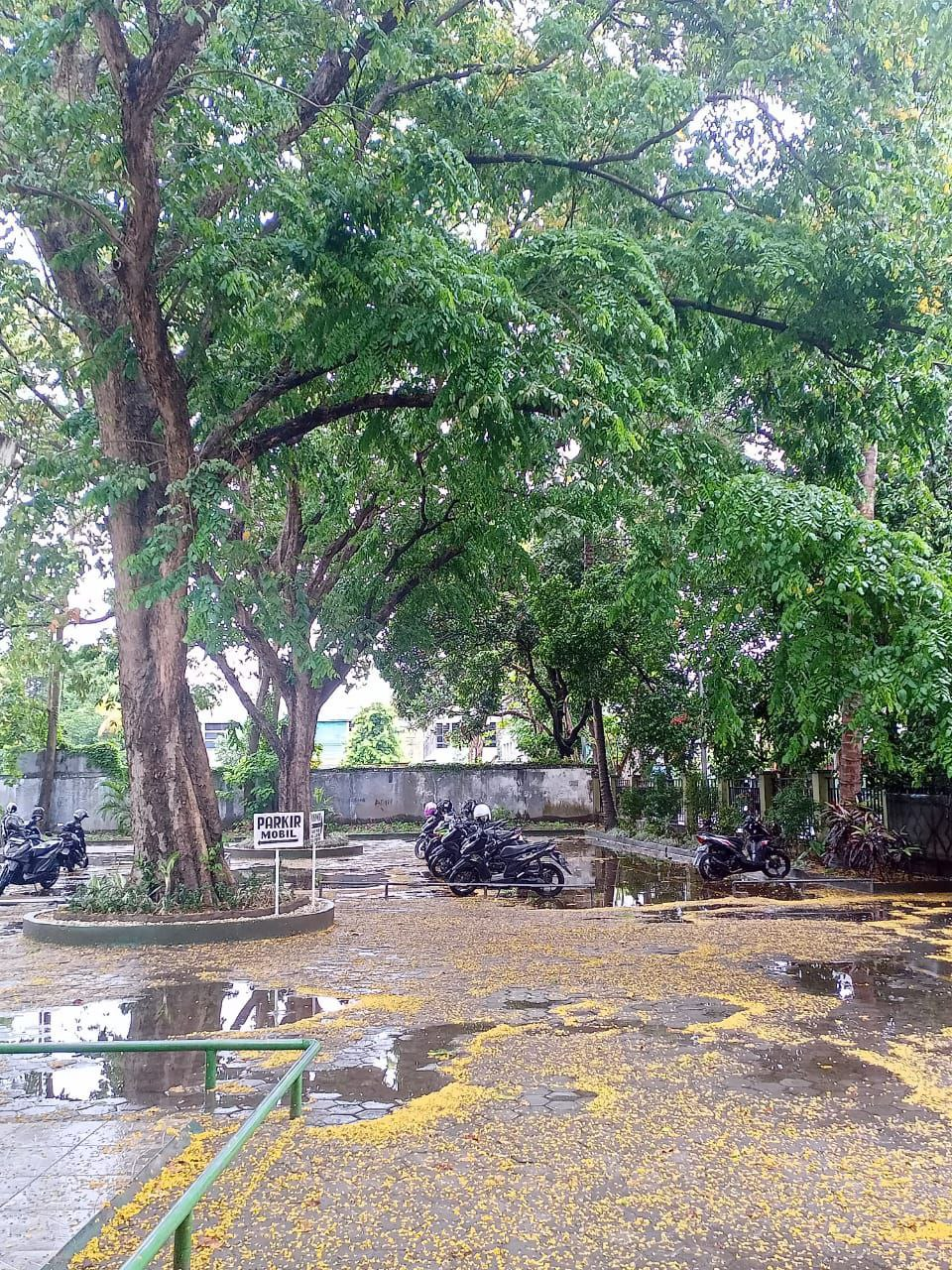
Baabul at Spring

Situated in Mataram City, the Masjid Babul Hikmah UNRAM is a prominent place of worship for the local Muslim community. The mosque provides a space for daily congregational prayers, including Fajr (dawn), Dhuhr (noon), Asr (afternoon), Maghrib (sunset), and Isha (night). Additionally, it serves as a gathering place for special religious observances, such as Ramadan, where community members come together for communal iftar (breaking of the fast) and Tarawih prayers. The mosque also plays a vital role in the community by facilitating the collection and distribution of donations, alms, sacrificial meat, and zakat from Mataram City residents.

=== Stadium ===
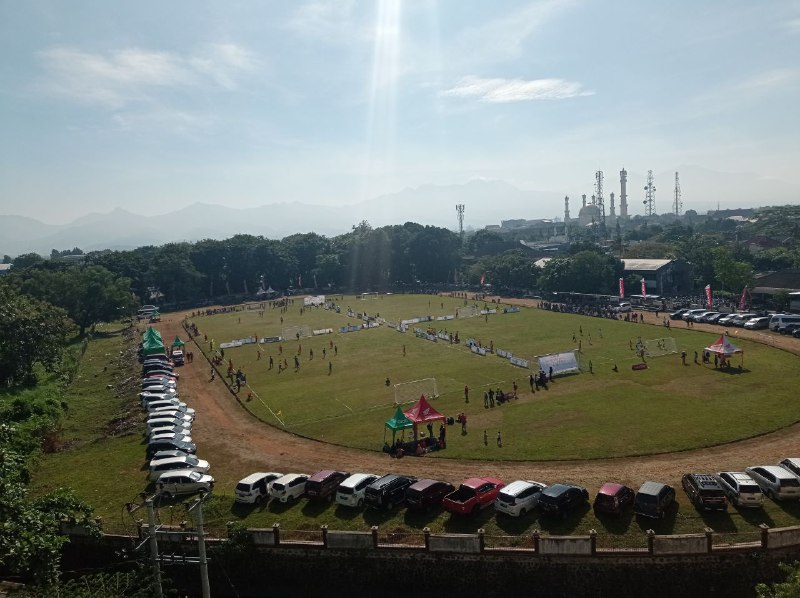
Stadium of UNRAM from above

Stadium of UNRAM located next to Masjid Baabul UNRAM.

== Academics ==
There are 10 faculties and 73 study programs, also 13 international classes program in University of Mataram.

== Notable alumni ==
- Mesir Suryadi, former member of the People's Representative Council
- Ahmad Junaidi, Ph.D., lecturer and social activist
- Diajeng Sekartaji, Putri Indonesia NTB 2023
