= Muhammad Zainul Majdi =

Indonesian politician (born 1972)

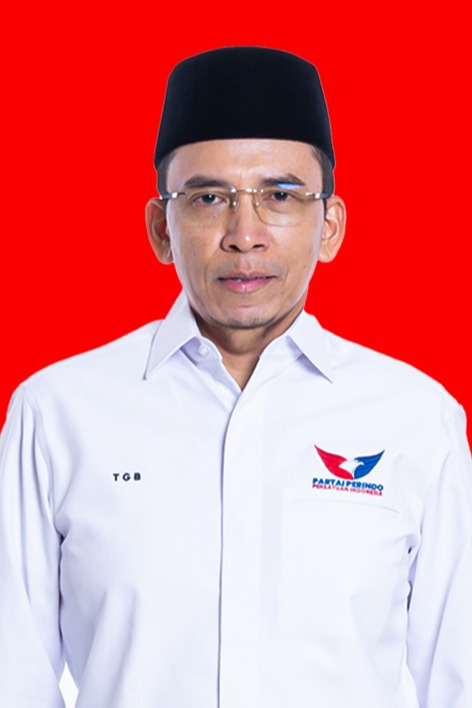

7th Governor of West Nusa Tenggara
- In office 17 September 2008 – 17 September 2018
- Deputy: Badrul Munir (2008–13); H. Muhammad Amin (2013–18)
- Preceded by: Lalu Serinata
- Succeeded by: Zulkieflimansyah

National Daily Head of Indonesian Unity Party
- Incumbent
- Assumed office 2015
- Preceded by: Office established

Personal details
- Born: 31 May 1972 (age 53) Selong, West Nusa Tenggara, Indonesia
- Party: Perindo
- Other political affiliations: Golkar (2018–2022); Democratic Party (2013–2018); Crescent Star Party (2004–2013)
- Spouses: Robiatul Adawiyah (m. 1997–2013) Erica Lucyfara Panjaitan (m. 2013)
- Children: 6

Muhammad Zainul Majdi (born 31 May 1972) is an Indonesian Islamic politician who served as Governor of West Nusa Tenggara between 2008 and 2018. He is also known as Tuan Guru Bajang. He was sworn in by Minister of Home Affairs Mardiyanto on 17 September 2008.

He was the best-performing Perindo Legislative candidate of the 2024 Indonesian general election, both in his home province of West Nusa Tenggara and also nationally, with 182,024 votes. However, the party failed to win any seats in the House of Representatives of Indonesia, particularly because it did not reach the electoral threshold of 4% of votes, only winning 1.29% of the vote.

Political offices
Preceded by Lalu Serinata	Governor of West Nusa Tenggara; 2008–2018	Succeeded by Zulkieflimansyah
