= Mohan Roliskana =

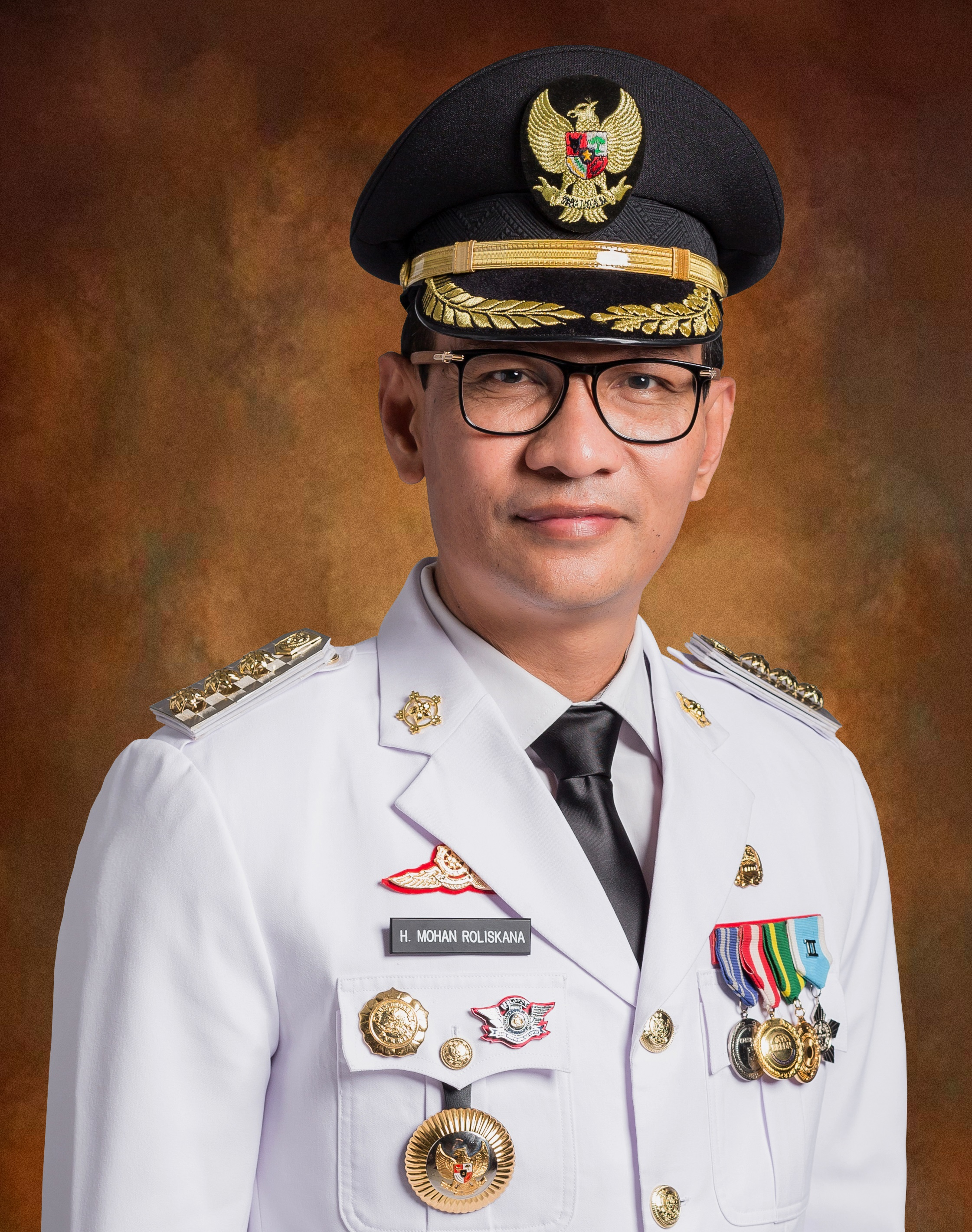
- 2021 portrait

Mayor of Mataram
- Incumbent
- Assumed office 26 February 2021
- Preceded by: Ahyar Abduh

Vice Mayor of Mataram
- In office 17 February 2016 – 17 February 2021
- In office 10 August 2010 – 10 August 2015
- Mayor: Ahyar Abduh
- Preceded by: Ahyar Abduh
- Succeeded by: Mujiburrahman

Personal details
- Born: 16 November 1972 (age 53) Mataram, West Nusa Tenggara, Indonesia
- Party: Golkar

Mohan Roliskana (born 16 November 1972) is an Indonesian politician of the Golkar party and former civil servant who has been the mayor of Mataram, West Nusa Tenggara since 2021. He had previously served as the city's vice-mayor between 2010 and 2020, and had worked for the city's government between 1999 and 2010 during his father's terms as mayor.

== Early life ==
Mohan Roliskana was born in the city of Mataram on 16 November 1972. His father, Mohammad Ruslan, was a politician of the Golkar party who had served as mayor of the city for two terms, between 1999–2004 and 2005–2010. Roliskana studied in Mataram's public schools until completing high school in 1991, before moving to Yogyakarta where he studied for a communications degree at Atma Jaya University. He graduated in 1998. He later received a master's (2007) and a doctorate (2024) in law from the University of Mataram.

== Career ==
After graduating from Atma Jaya, Roliskana briefly worked as an account executive in Surabaya before returning to Mataram in 1999 to work as a municipal employee under his father's mayoralship. Between 2005 and 2010, he was working in the city's parks department in billboard-related work. By 2010, upon the expiry of his father's second term, Roliskana ran as the running mate of Ahyar Abduh in the city's 2010 election and was elected, being sworn in on 10 August 2010. They were reelected for a second term in 2015, and was sworn in for a second term on 17 February 2016.

=== Mayor of Mataram ===
In 2020, as Abduh reached the end of his second term, Roliskana ran for mayor in the 2020 mayoral election with Mujiburrahman as running mate. The pair received the backing of Golkar, Nasdem, PPP, and PBB, and won the four-way mayoral race with 78,407 votes (38.4%). Roliskana and Mujiburrahman would be reelected for a second term as mayor following the 2024 mayoral election in which they won 112,946 votes (56.65%). Since 2021, he would also serve as chairman of Golkar's provincial branch in West Nusa Tenggara, being reelected to serve until 2030 in 2025.

During his campaigns for the 2020 election, Roliskana promised to improve access to capital of the city's small and medium enterprises. However, by 2022, there had been limited implementation, resulting in criticism from city legislators. Roliskana also announced that the city will maintain and expand its urban green space to reach 20 percent of the city's area of 61.3 square kilometres (23.7 sq mi), including through restricting the issuance of new construction permits in designated park areas. In July 2025, large-scale flooding struck Mataram, and Roliskana's mayoral office hosted an aid kitchen to feed displaced residents.

In 2025, Roliskana issued a ban on the use of cellphones in all elementary and middle schools in Mataram, covering both public and private schools.

== Family ==
He married Noviani Danar Kinnastri, a former university lecturer, in 2000, and the couple had four children.
