= Zulkieflimansyah =

Indonesian politician

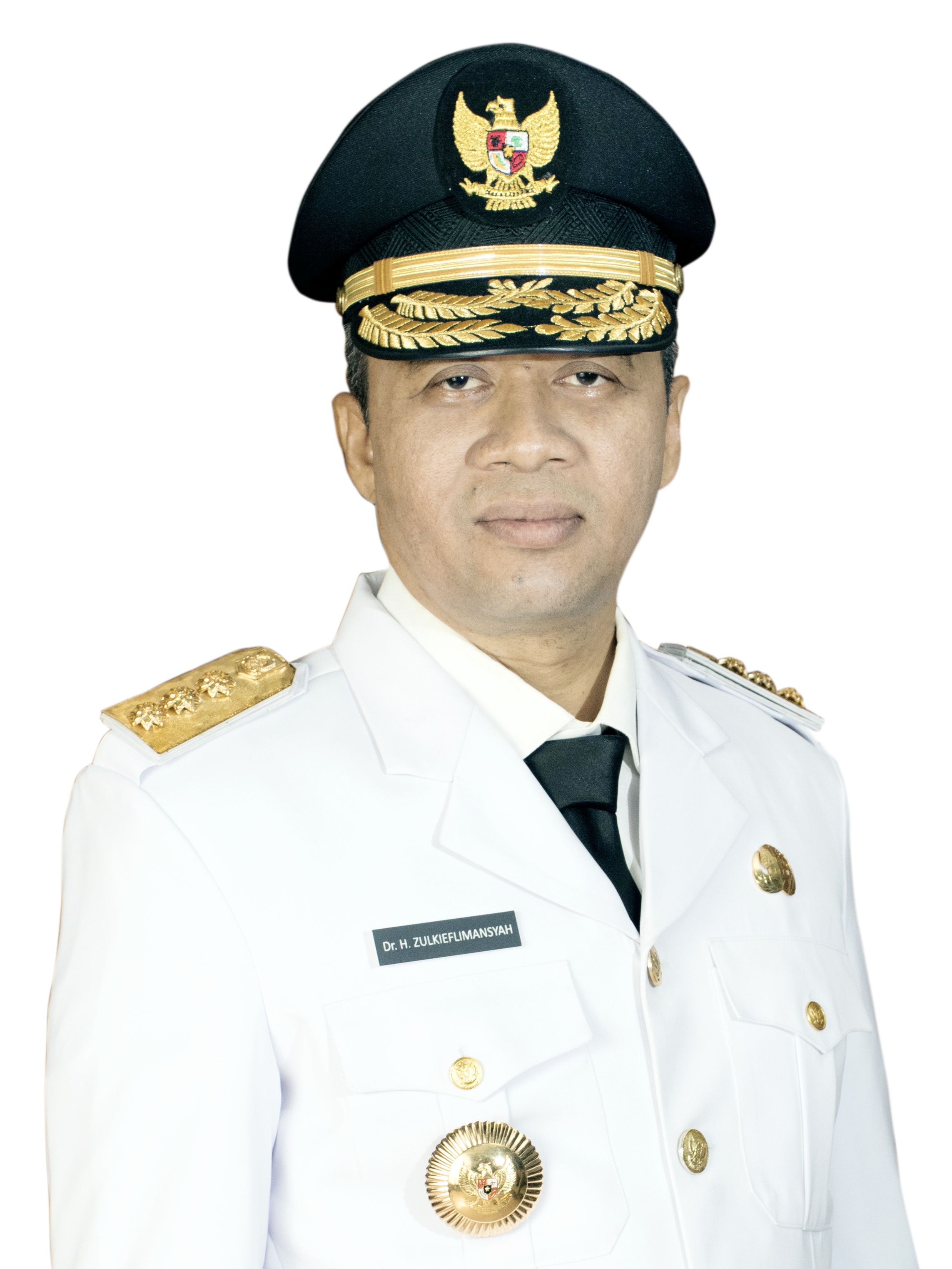

Governor of West Nusa Tenggara
- In office 19 September 2018 – 19 September 2023
- Deputy: Sitti Rohmi Djalilah
- Preceded by: Muhammad Zainul Majdi
- Succeeded by: Lalu Gita Ariadi (acting)

Member of People's Representative Council
- In office 1 October 2004 – 2 February 2018
- Succeeded by: Ei Nurul Khotimah
- Constituency: Banten II

Personal details
- Born: 18 May 1972 (age 54) Sumbawa Besar, West Nusa Tenggara, Indonesia
- Party: PKS
- Education: University of Indonesia; University of Strathclyde

Zulkieflimansyah (born 18 May 1972), sometimes colloquially called Bang Zul, is an Indonesian politician and academic who is the latest Governor proper of West Nusa Tenggara, serving for the term 2018–2023. Before being elected as governor, he had been elected to the People's Representative Council thrice.

A graduate of the University of Strathclyde and the University of Indonesia, he served as a representative of Banten for over 13 years before being elected governor of his origin province.

== Background ==
Zulkieflimansyah was born in the town of Sumbawa Besar on 18 May 1972. During his studies, he participated in a student exchange program and studied briefly in Australia. After he returned home, he studied at the University of Indonesia, graduating from the Faculty of Economics in 1995. He then continued his studies at the University of Strathclyde, gaining a Masters in Marketing by 1998 and another Masters in Industrialization, Trade and Economic Policy. He later earned a doctorate in Strathclyde in 2001.

== Career ==
=== Parliament ===
He was elected to the People's Representative Council following the 2004 legislative election, winning a seat from Banten's 2nd district. According to Hidayat Nur Wahid, Zulkieflimansyah's lobbying was instrumental in Hidayat becoming a parliamentary speaker by securing the votes of the Regional Representative Council members. In 2006, he ran as a gubernatorial candidate in Banten's gubernatorial election, but lost to Ratu Atut Chosiyah, placing second with 33.15 percent of the votes. He secured reelection in 2009, and was appointed deputy chairman of the ninth commission in 2011.

In the 2014 legislative election, he secured a third term after winning 38,966 votes. He resigned to run in the 2018 West Nusa Tenggara gubernatorial election, with his resignation being accepted on 2 February 2018.

=== Governor ===
Running with Sitti Rohmi Djalilah, Zulkieflimansyah won after securing 31.8 percent of votes in a four-candidate race. He was sworn in by Joko Widodo on 19 September 2018.
