= Mataram (city) =

Capital and largest city of West Nusa Tenggara, Indonesia

- City
- City of Mataram; Kota Mataram
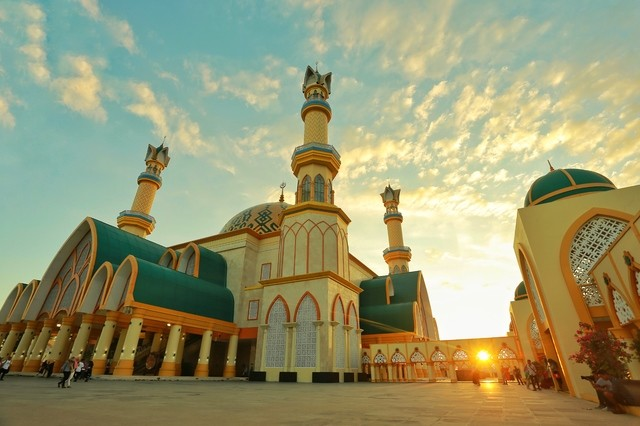
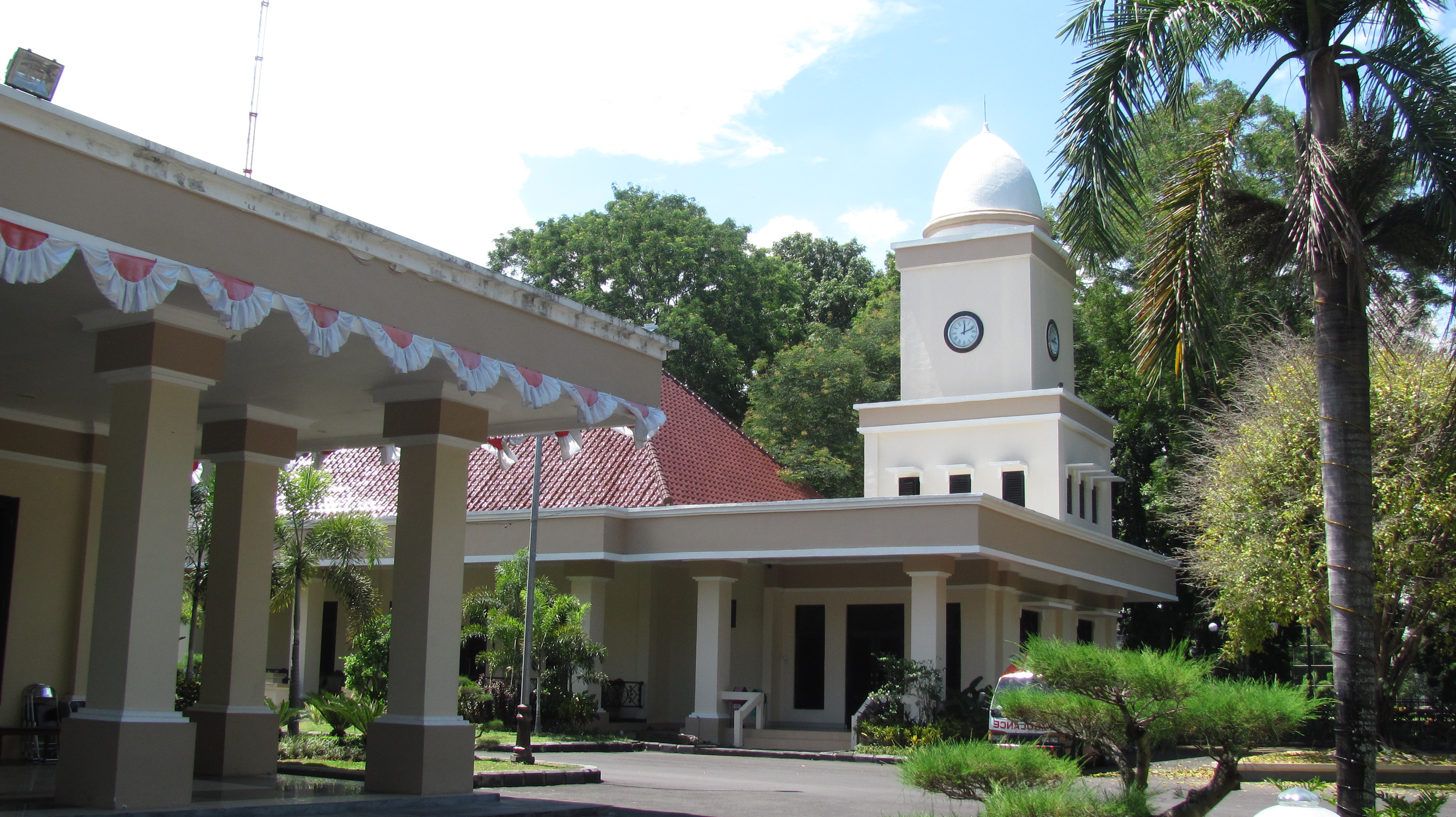
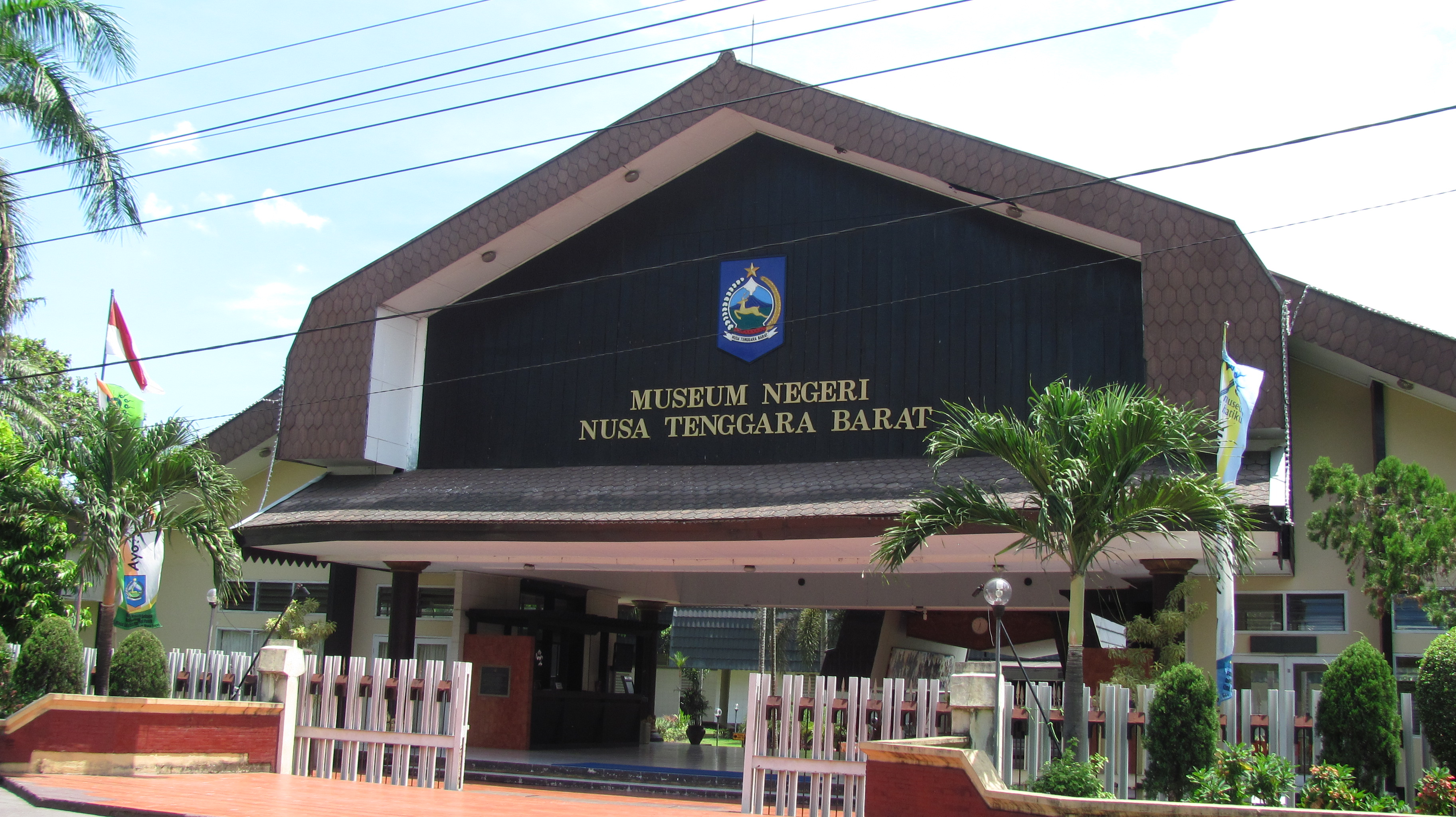
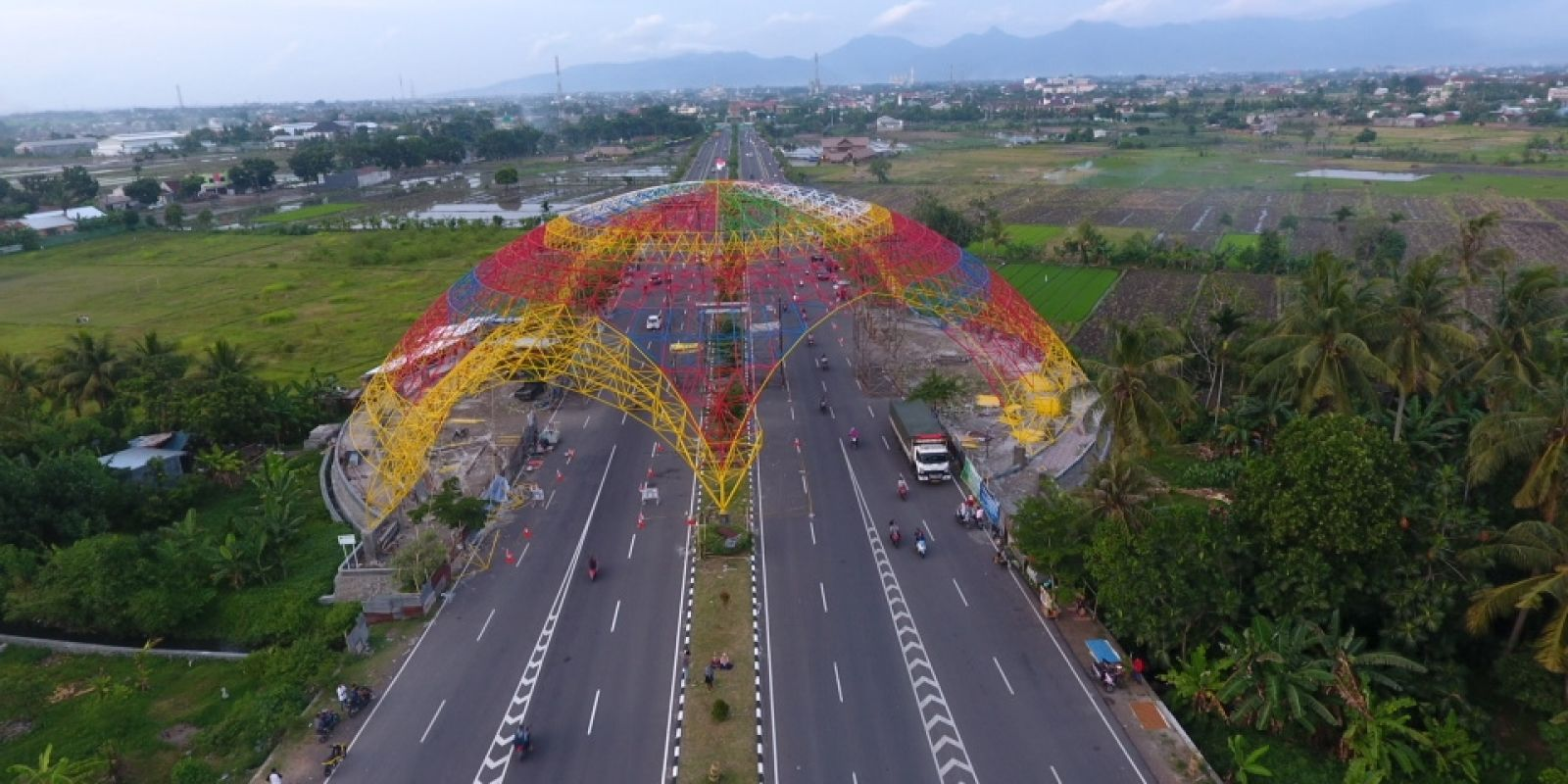
- Clockwise, from top; Hubbul Wathan Islamic center, Mataram City Hall, West Nusa Tenggara museum and Tembolaq Gate

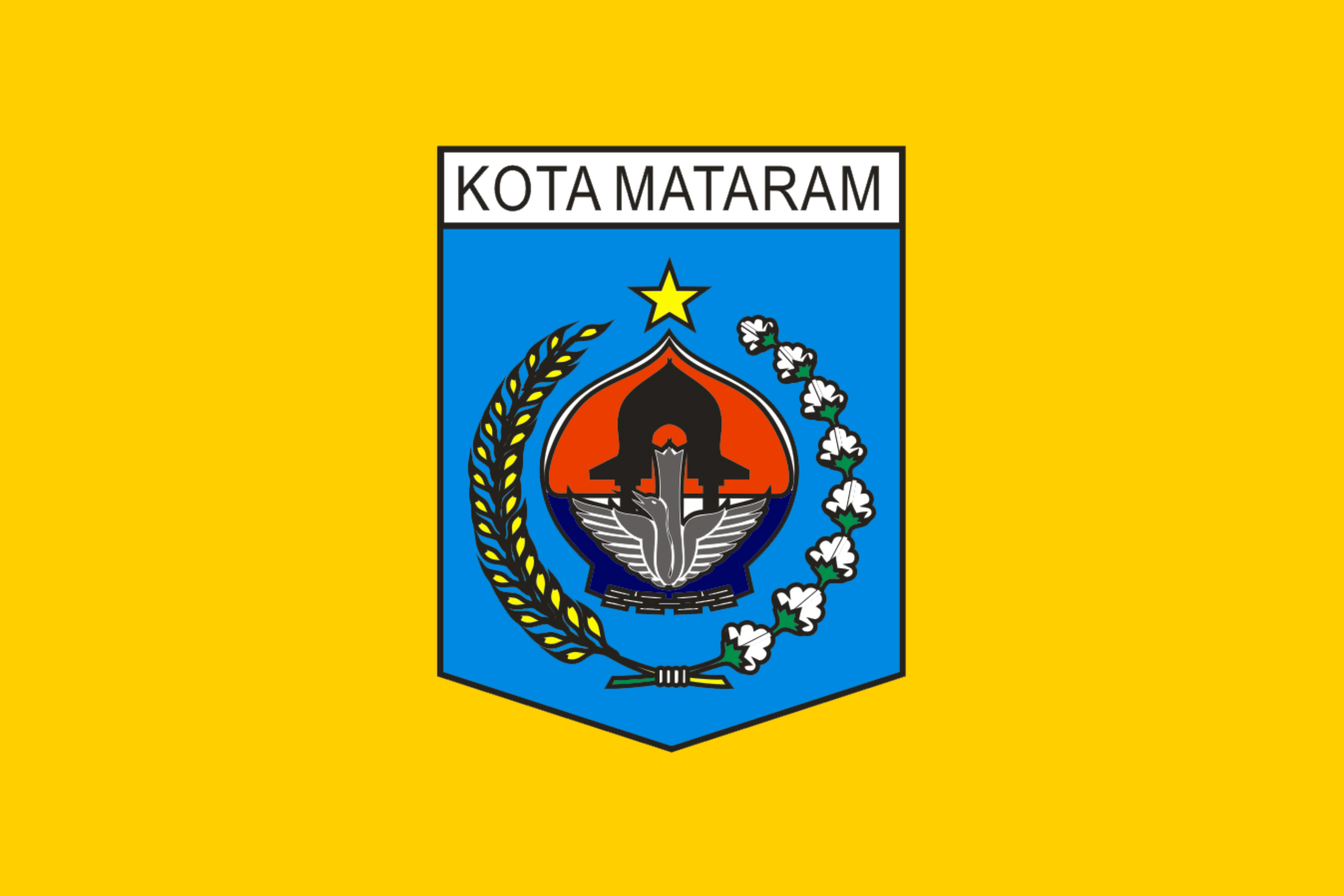
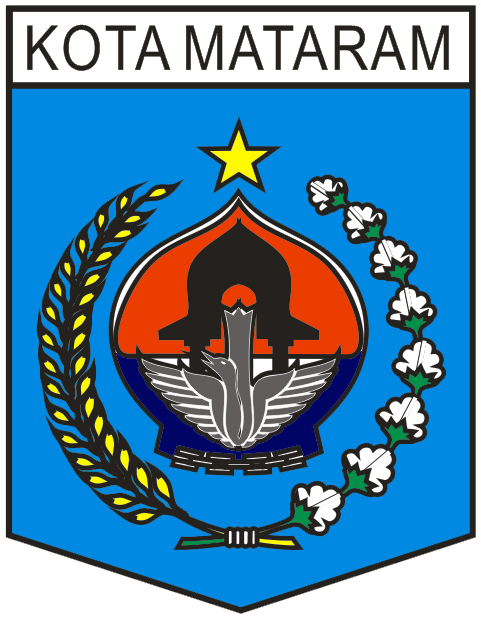
- Flag Coat of arms

- Location within West Nusa Tenggara

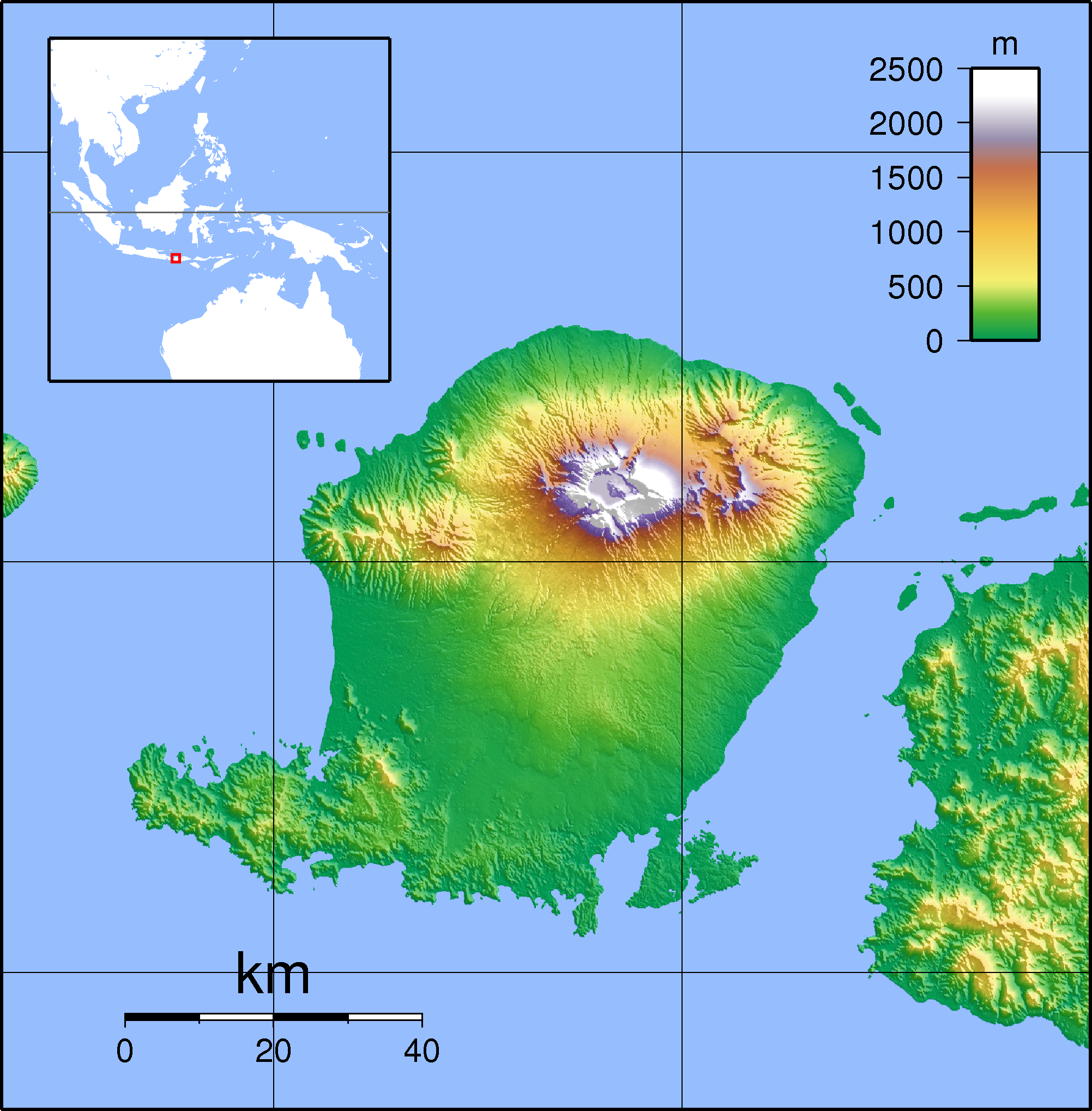
- Location in Lombok, Lesser Sunda Islands and Indonesia Mataram (Lesser Sunda Islands) Mataram (Indonesia)
- Coordinates: 8°35′S 116°7′E
- Country: Indonesia
- Province: West Nusa Tenggara

Government
  - Mayor: Mohan Roliskana (Golkar)
  - Vice Mayor: Mujiburrahman
  - Legislature: Mataram City Regional House of Representatives (DPRD)

Area
  - Total: 60.13 km^{2} (23.22 sq mi)
- Elevation: 26 m (85 ft)

Population (mid 2025 estimate)
  - Total: 448,780
  - Density: 7,463/km^{2} (19,330/sq mi)
- Time zone: UTC+8 (Indonesia Central Time)
- Area code: (+62) 370
- HDI (2023): ▲0.795 (High)
- Website: mataramkota.go.id

Mataram (Indonesian: Kota Mataram; pronounced [ˌkot̪a maˈt̪aram]) is a capital city of the Indonesian province of West Nusa Tenggara. The city is surrounded on all the landward sides by (but is not administratively part of) West Lombok Regency and lies on the western side of the island of Lombok, Indonesia. It is also the largest city of the province, and had a population of 402,843 at the 2010 Census and 429,651 at the 2020 Census; the official estimate as of mid 2025 was 448,780 (comprising 223,420 males and 225,360 females). The city is an economic, cultural, and education center of the province. It hosts all public universities in the province, the main airport, and also main government offices. Greater Mataram Area (Indonesian: Mataram Raya) or sometimes also called Gumi Rinjani Metropolitan Area is a metropolitan area surrounding the city with a total population of around 3 million people as of 2015, making it one of the largest metropolitan areas in the Lesser Sunda Islands along with the Denpasar metropolitan area in Bali.

== History ==
A small city called Selaparang in East Lombok was the centre of Sasak power in Lombok from the 16th to the 17th century AD. At this time West Lombok was under the control of Balinese rajas, based on their states of Mataram and Cakranegara, until the island was invaded and occupied by the Dutch in 1894.

== Geography ==
The modern city is characterized by urban sprawl in the middle of West Lombok, composed of three contiguous towns which were formerly separate but now share a single administration. From west to east, the old port town of Ampenan in the west merges into the administrative centre of Mataram and this in turn merges into the commercial town of Cakranegara. Further east still lies the district of Sweta, the location of Lombok's biggest market as well as Lombok's bus terminal. The towns are linked by a wide, 8km-long one-way street which begins as Jalan Langko in Apenan, becomes Jalan Pejanggik in Mataram and finishes as Jalan Selaparang in Cakranegara; it then continues east as the principal cross-island highway to Labuhan Lombok and then Kayangan, site of the Lombok-Sumbawa ferry.

== Governance ==
=== Administrative division ===
The city consists of six districts (kecamatan), tabulated below with their areas and their populations at the 2010 Census and the 2020 Census, together with the official estimates as of mid 2025. The table also includes the number of administrative villages (all classed as urban kelurahan, also called "kampungs") in each district, and its postal codes.

Kode Wilayah	Name of District (kecamatan)	Area in km^{2}	Pop'n Census 2010	Pop'n Census 2020	Pop'n Estimate mid 2025	No. of villages	Post codes
52.71.01	Ampenan	9.13	78,779	88,022	92,178	10	83118 ^{(a)}
52.71.04	Sekarbela	11.24	53,112	58,786	61,520	5	83115 & 83116
52.71.02	Mataram	9.63	73,107	77,465	80,811	9	83127 ^{(b)}
52.71.05	Selaparang	9.45	72,665	68,657	71,325	9	83126
52.71.03	Cakranegara	8.97	64,087	67,826	70,749	10	83238 - 63239
52.71.06	Sandubaya	11.71	61,093	68,895	72,197	7	83232 - 63237
	Totals	60.13	402,843	429,651	448,780	50	

Notes: (a) except the kampungs of Ampenan Tengah (postcode 83112), Pejeruk (postcode 83113), Ampenan Selatan (postcode 83114) and Ampenan Utara (postcode 83511). (b) except the kampung of Pagutan (postcode 83117).

== Demographics ==
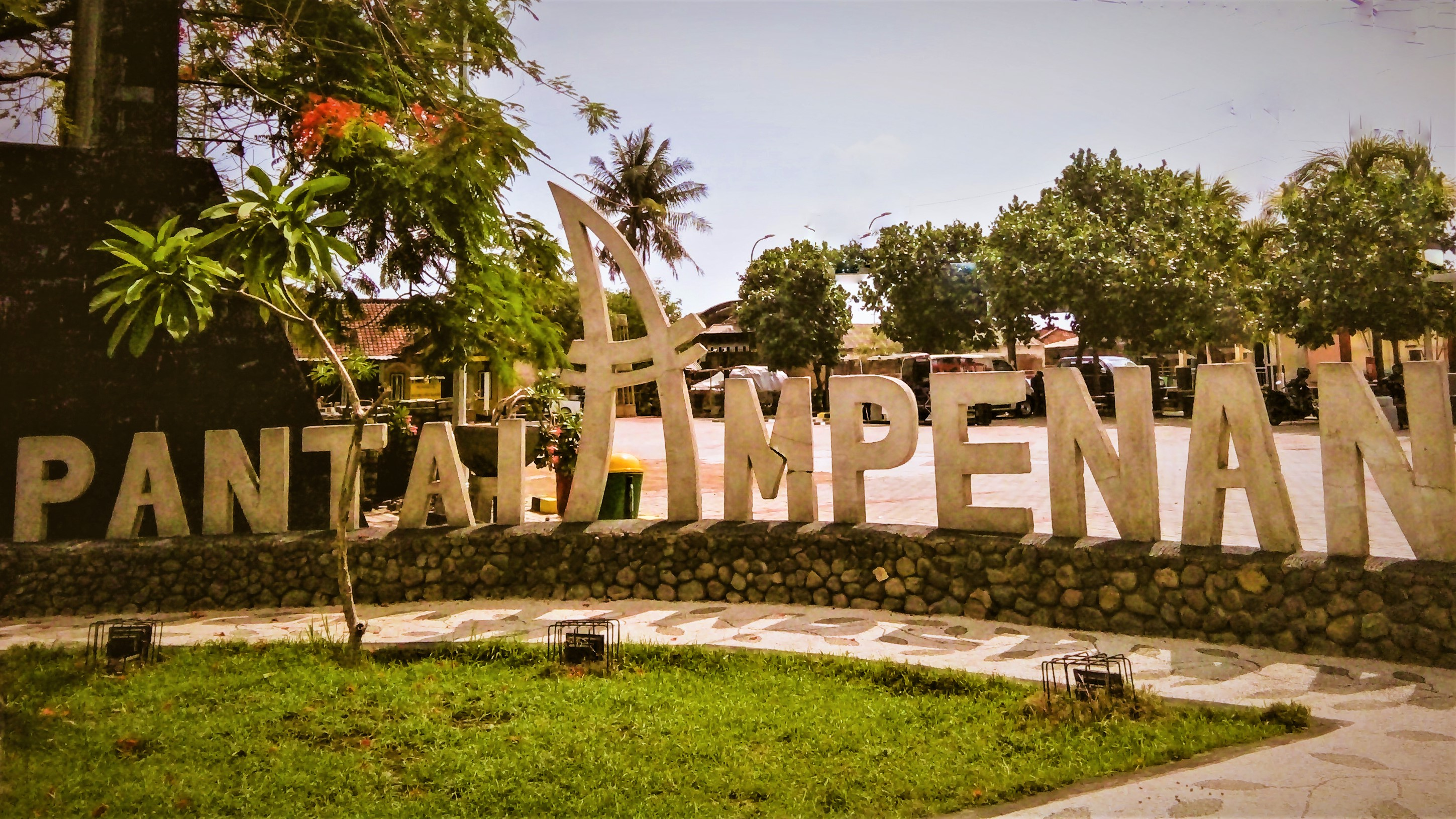
Ampenan Beach

=== Ethnicity ===
The Sasak people are the indigenous people of Lombok and form the majority of Mataram's residents. Mataram is also home to Balinese, Javanese, Buginese, Bimanese, Tionghoa-Peranakan people of mixed Indonesian and Chinese descent and a small number of Arab Indonesian people, mainly of Yemeni descent who arrived when the town was known as "Ampenan". Despite being urban dwellers, the Sasak people of Mataram still identify strongly with their origins and the Sasak culture.

There is also an ethnic Malay settlement in the Ampenan district, known as Kampung Melayu, where the residents are ethnic Malays (Ampenan Malays) and speak Malay language (Ampenan Malay). The people of Mataram had known the Malay language since the mid-19th century, or also before that. As mentioned by Wallace in his book The Malay Archipelago (1869), the people of Lombok dialogued with Fernandes about divinity. Also by Charles Kordhoff, a US sailor, who mentioned the use of Malay in Lombok.

=== Language ===
Mataram society normally speaks the Sasak language, which is the native language of the indigenous people of Lombok. Indonesian is the language most widely used in formal business, education and government contexts. When at home or a place of recreation, Mataram residents tend to use the Mataram Sasak dialect. There is also a large community of Balinese speakers in the city, as in the past Mataram was a colony and center of government for the Karangasem kingdom of Bali. In addition, Ampenan Malay is also used in the old town of Ampenan as an regional language and the main spoken language there.

== Sister City ==
- Pengzhou, China

== Climate ==
Mataram has a tropical monsoon climate (Köppen Am) with heavy rainfall from October to March and moderate to little rainfall from April to September.

Climate data for Mataram
Month	Jan	Feb	Mar	Apr	May	Jun	Jul	Aug	Sep	Oct	Nov	Dec	Year
Mean daily maximum °C (°F)	30.5 (86.9)	30.6 (87.1)	30.7 (87.3)	31.3 (88.3)	31.0 (87.8)	30.3 (86.5)	29.7 (85.5)	30.2 (86.4)	30.9 (87.6)	31.2 (88.2)	31.2 (88.2)	31.0 (87.8)	30.7 (87.3)
Daily mean °C (°F)	26.6 (79.9)	26.8 (80.2)	26.5 (79.7)	26.5 (79.7)	26.0 (78.8)	25.1 (77.2)	24.5 (76.1)	25.0 (77.0)	25.9 (78.6)	26.4 (79.5)	26.9 (80.4)	26.9 (80.4)	26.1 (79.0)
Mean daily minimum °C (°F)	22.2 (72.0)	23.0 (73.4)	22.4 (72.3)	21.7 (71.1)	21.1 (70.0)	20.0 (68.0)	19.4 (66.9)	19.8 (67.6)	20.9 (69.6)	21.7 (71.1)	22.6 (72.7)	22.8 (73.0)	21.5 (70.6)
Average rainfall mm (inches)	290 (11.4)	237 (9.3)	170 (6.7)	114 (4.5)	108 (4.3)	72 (2.8)	77 (3.0)	54 (2.1)	62 (2.4)	126 (5.0)	190 (7.5)	282 (11.1)	1,782 (70.1)
