= 2019 Lombok earthquake =

Earthquake in Indonesia

March 2019 Lombok earthquake
- Location within Indonesia
- UTC time: 2019-03-17 07:07:25
- ISC event: 615350041
- USGS-ANSS: ComCat
- Local date: 2019-03-17
- Local time: 15:07:25 WITA
- Magnitude: 5.6 M_{w}
- Depth: 10 km (6 mi)
- Epicenter: 8.418°S 116.521°E
- Max. intensity: MMI VI (Strong)
- Landslides: Yes
- Casualties: 6 dead, 182 injured

On 17 March 2019, an earthquake measuring M_{w} 5.6 struck the island of Lombok in West Nusa Tenggara, Indonesia. The earthquake triggered a landslide, killing six and injuring nearly 200 others.

== Earthquake ==
The earthquake has its epicenter in East Lombok Regency, with a reported magnitude and depth of M_{w} 5.6 and 10 kilometres (6.2 mi) according to the United States Geological Survey (USGS), while the Indonesian Meteorology, Climatology, and Geophysical Agency (BMKG) reported a magnitude of M_{w} 5.4 and a depth of 11 kilometres (6.8 mi). BMKG attributed the earthquake to a local fault in the vicinity of Mount Rinjani. Aftershocks exceeding M_{w} 5.0 were recorded.

== Casualties ==
The earthquake caused a landslide and several rockfalls that struck a group of around forty tourists visiting a waterfall in East Lombok, killing six of them. Among the six deaths were two Malaysian tourists and a 14-year-old boy. 26 other Malaysian tourists were also injured. Four people were injured when a house collapsed. In total the Indonesian National Board for Disaster Management reported 182 injuries in East and North Lombok regencies.

== Damage ==
According to Indonesian Social Minister Agus Gumiwang Kartasasmita, 83,000 homes were damaged; including 4,400 homes heavily damaged.

== Reactions ==
Malaysian Prime Minister Mahathir Mohamad extended his condolences to the families of the two Malaysians who were killed in the quake-triggered landslide.

== See also ==
- List of earthquakes in 2019
- List of earthquakes in Indonesia
- 5 August 2018 Lombok earthquake
- 19 August 2018 Lombok earthquake
- July 2018 Lombok earthquake
