= 2018 Indonesia earthquake =

The 2018 Indonesian earthquake may refer to:

- 2018 West Java earthquake – 23 January – 5.9
- 2018 Lombok earthquake – July–August cluster – 6.4 foreshock, 6.9 mainshock, 5.9 aftershock, 6.4 aftershock
- 19 August 2018 Lombok earthquake – 6.9
- 2018 Sulawesi earthquake and tsunami – 28 September – 6.1 foreshock, 7.5 mainshock
- 2018 East Java earthquake – 11 October – 6.0
