= 2018 East Java earthquake =

Earthquake affecting Indonesia

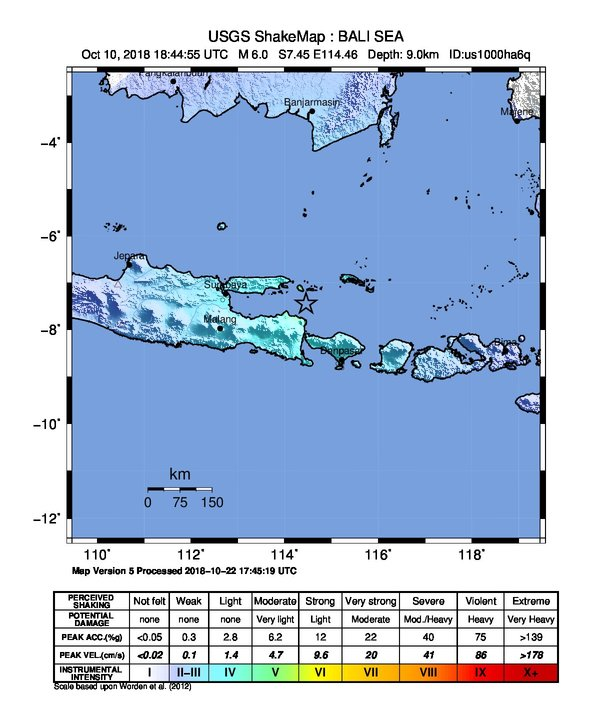
- Shakemap of the earthquake

- Location within Java Location within Indonesia
- UTC time: 2018-10-11 18:44:55
- ISC event: 613407851
- USGS-ANSS: ComCat
- Local date: 11 October 2018
- Local time: 01:44:55 WIB
- Magnitude: 6.0 M_{w}
- Depth: 9 km (6 mi)
- Epicentre: 7.453°S 114.456°E
- Max. intensity: MMI V (Moderate)
- Aftershocks: 14
- Casualties: 4 dead 26 injured

On 11 October 2018, an earthquake struck off the coast of East Java, Indonesia, with the epicentre located off the coast of Situbondo Regency. The earthquake, which struck at dawn, killed four people in addition to destroying or damaging hundreds of houses, mostly on the small island of Sapudi.

== Earthquake ==
The earthquake occurred at 18:44:55 UTC (01:44:55 WIB), with a magnitude of M_{w} 6.0, at 9 km depth and epicenter location of 7.453°S 114.456°E (USGS) or M_{w} 6.3, 12 km depth and epicenter at 7.46°S 114.44°E (BMKG). The epicenter was located underwater, around 60 km northeast of the town of Situbondo. Indonesian Meteorology, Climatology, and Geophysical Agency reported 12 aftershocks, the strongest one occurring at 02:22 local time with a M_{w} of 3.5. BMKG attributed the earthquake to an unmapped thrust fault, adding that the region historically saw relatively low seismicity and that the earthquake was not caused by the larger and more destructive earthquakes in Sulawesi and Lombok.

According to Indonesian National Board for Disaster Management (BNPB) spokesman Sutopo Purwo Nugroho, the earthquake was felt in 22 regencies and cities in East Java province, including the provincial capital and Indonesia's second-largest city Surabaya. No tsunami warnings were issued, and none occurred. Attendees of the 2018 International Monetary Fund Summit in Denpasar reported feeling the earthquake, but no damage occurred and the summit continued without significant disruption.

== Casualties ==
The earthquake killed four people, and injured at least 26. As the earthquake struck around 2 am, many of the victims were asleep during the shaking and could not escape. Three of the deaths occurred in Prambanan village of Sapudi Island and were caused by falling roof shrapnel, while the fourth fatality was in Jember, where a 47-year-old man died after he slipped and hit his head when running out of his house during the earthquake.

== Aftermath ==
Nearly 500 houses were reported to be damaged by the day following the earthquake in Sapudi Island alone, with lesser damage in other regencies. Cleanup operations, assisted by soldiers from Kodam V/Brawijaya, began soon after the earthquake. Social minister Agus Gumiwang visited Sapudi later in the day of the earthquake. Governor of East Java Soekarwo also visited the island, and promised that the provincial government would incur the costs of repairing damaged houses, with the provincial administration allocating Rp 23.7 billion (US$1.6 million) for the purpose. The central government also provided benefits of Rp 15 million (~USD 1,000) for the relatives of the fatalities, in addition to smaller benefits from the local governments.

== See also ==
- List of earthquakes in 2018
- List of earthquakes in Indonesia
