= Masbate (disambiguation) =

Masbate is a province in the Philippines.

Masbate may also refer to:

- Masbate City, capital city of Masbate province
- Masbate Island, one of the three major islands that comprises the Masbate province
- Masbate Airport

== See also ==
- Masbate language (disambiguation)
- Masbateño (disambiguation)
- Masbagik
