= Śakra =

Śakra or Sakra may refer to:

- an epithet of the Hindu deity Indra
- Śakra (Buddhism), a deity in Buddhism
- Sakra (film), 2023 wuxia film directed by Donnie Yen
- Sakra Assembly constituency, an assembly constituency reserved for scheduled castes in Bihar, India
- Sakra, Mainpuri, village in Uttar Pradesh state, India
- Sakra, a district in West Nusa Tenggara, Indonesia

== See also ==
- Sakrah, a village in Syria
- Sakka (disambiguation)
- Sukra (disambiguation)
- Sakura, the Cherry blossom flower
