= Kota Raja =

Kota Raja Kota Raja
- Village
- Location in Indonesia
- Coordinates: 8°35′33.48″S 116°25′12″E
- Country: Indonesia
- Province: West Nusa Tenggara
- Regency: East Lombok
- District: Sikur
- Time zone: UTC+07.00 (WIB)

Kota Raja (Indonesian pronunciation: [ˌkot̪a ˈrad͡ʒa]) is a village in Sikur district, West Nusa Tenggara Province, Indonesia.
