= Surabaya (disambiguation) =

Surabaya is a capital and largest city in East Java, Indonesia.

Surabaya may also refer to:

- Surabaya Metropolitan Area, consisting of the city of Surabaya and parts of surrounding regencies
- Surabaya, an urban village in Sungai Serut, Bengkulu City, Bengkulu, Indonesia
- Surabaya, a village in East Sakra, East Lombok Regency, West Nusa Tenggara, Indonesia
- Surabaya, a village in Balubur Limbangan, Garut Regency, West Java, Indonesia
- Persebaya Surabaya, a soccer club in Surabaya, East Java, Indonesia

== See also ==
- Surabaya International Airport
- HNLMS De Zeven Provinciën (1909), a Royal Netherlands Navy coastal defence ship renamed Soerabaja
