= Sakka =

Sakka may refer to:

== Places ==
- Sakka, Rif Dimashq Governorate, a village near Damascus, Syria
- Limmu Sakka, one of the woredas in the Oromia Region of Ethiopia
- Ras ben Sakka, the northernmost point of the African continent

== Other ==
- Sakka (surname)
- Śakra (Buddhism), a deity, the ruler of Tāvatiṃsa heaven according to Buddhist cosmology
- Sakka (publisher), a Belgian publisher

== See also ==
- Śakra (disambiguation)
