= Al-Thabitiyah =

Al-Thabitiyah الثابتية Thabetiya
- Village
- Location in Syria
- Coordinates: 34°41′50″N 36°51′15″E
- Country: Syria
- Governorate: Homs
- District: Homs
- Subdistrict: Homs

Population (2004)
  - Total: 1,946
- Time zone: UTC+2 (EET)
  - Summer (DST): UTC+3 (EEST)

Al-Thabitiyah (Arabic: الثابتية) is a village in the Homs Governorate in central Syria, just east of Homs. Nearby localities include Fairouzeh to the west, Sakrah to the north, al-Rayyan to the south and Tell Zubaydah to the southwest. According to the Central Bureau of Statistics (CBS), al-Thabitiyah had a population of 1,946 in 2004. Its inhabitants are predominantly Shia Muslims.
