= Kota Raja (disambiguation) =

Kota Raja may refer to:

- Kota Raja, village in Sikur, Indonesia
- Banda Aceh, the capital of the Indonesian province of Aceh
- Kota Raja (federal constituency), represented in the Dewan Rakyat
- Kota Raja (Perlis state constituency), formerly represented in the Perlis State Legislative Assembly (1986–95)
- Kota Raja (Selangor state constituency), formerly represented in the Selangor State Legislative Assembly (1995–2004)
