= 2018 Lombok earthquake =

Map of 2018 Lombok earthquakes

2018 Lombok earthquake may refer to the following five thrust type earthquakes, with epicentres north of Rinjani volcano, that caused significant damage and deaths:

- July 2018 Lombok earthquake (M_{w} and M_{L}: 6.4, a foreshock)
- 5 August 2018 Lombok earthquake (M_{w}: 6.9, M_{L}: 7.0, the mainshock)
- 9 August 2018 (M_{L}: 5.9 aftershock, 6 deaths)
- 18 August 2018 23:10pm local time Lombok earthquakes (M_{w}: 6.4 aftershock, 2 dead)
- 19 August 2018 Lombok earthquake (M_{w} 6.9 new earthquake, different fault.)

== See also ==
- 2018 Indonesia earthquakes
- List of earthquakes in Indonesia, including Lombok
- List of earthquakes in 2018
