= Sukra =

Shukra may refer to:

- Shukra, an ancient lineage of sages who counselled Asuras in Vedic history
- Sukra, alternate spelling of Shukra, the Sanskrit name for Venus
- Sukra, a Montserratian spirit or ghost

== See also ==
- Śakra (disambiguation)
