= July 2018 Lombok earthquake =

Earthquake that occurred in July 2018 in Indonesia

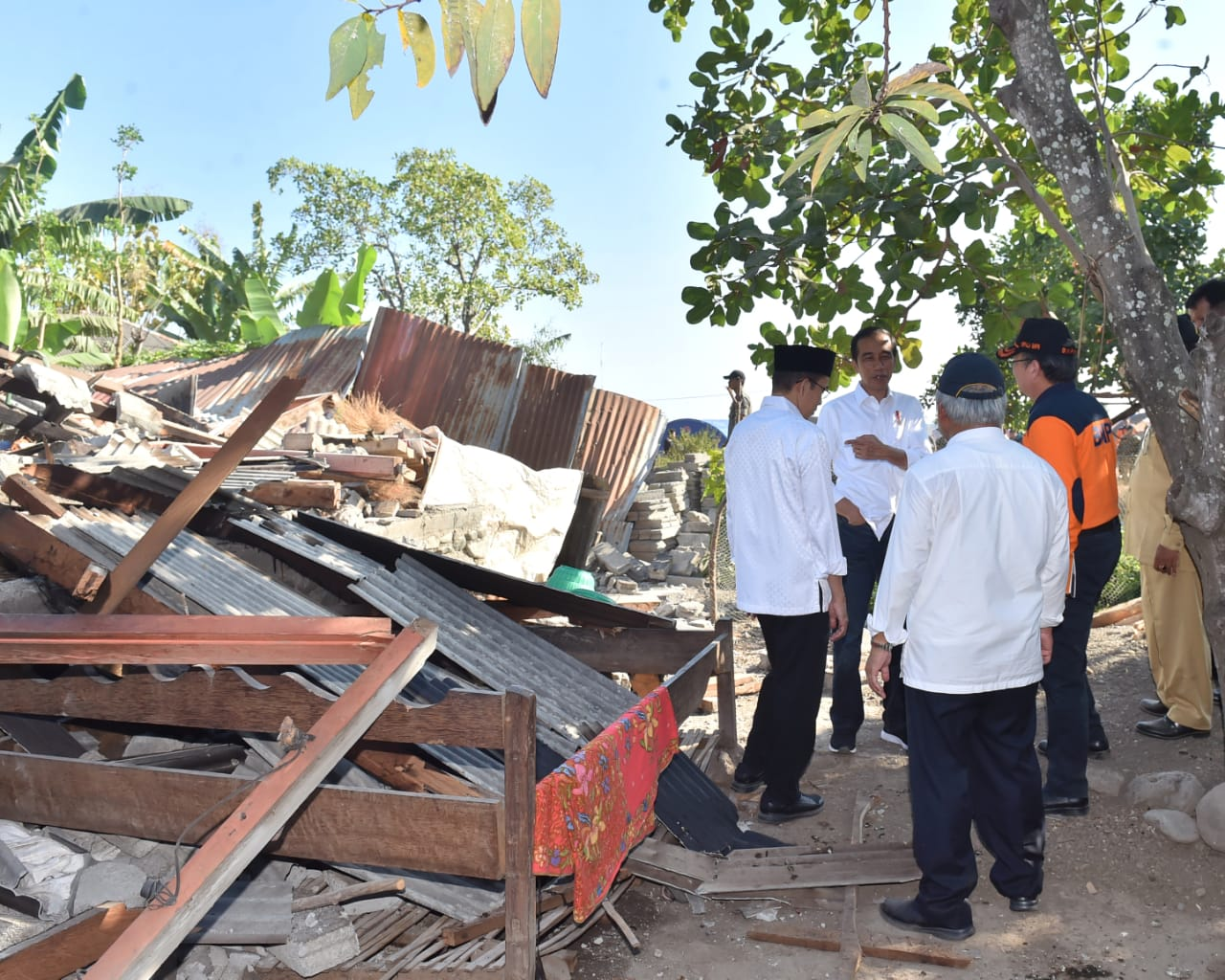
- President Joko Widodo inspected the damage in the worst-hit area after an earthquake struck Lombok

- Location within Indonesia
- UTC time: 2018-07-28 22:47:37
- ISC event: 615000905
- USGS-ANSS: ComCat
- Local date: 29 July 2018
- Local time: 06:47:37 WITA
- Duration: 10–20 seconds
- Magnitude: 6.4 M_{w}
- Depth: 14.0 km (8.7 mi)
- Epicenter: 8.240°S 116.508°E
- Fault: Flores back-arc thrust fault
- Type: Dip-slip (reverse)
- Areas affected: West Nusa Tenggara, Indonesia
- Max. intensity: MMI VII (Very strong)
- Landslides: Yes
- Aftershocks: 564
- Casualties: 20 fatalities 401 injured 10,062 displaced

Map of 2018 Lombok earthquakes

A M_{w} 6.4 earthquake struck the island of Lombok on the morning of 29 July 2018 at a shallow depth of 14 km (8.7 mi). Widespread damage was reported in the area, and authorities confirmed that 20 people were killed in the earthquake while hundreds were injured.

The epicentre was located in Sembalun Subdistrict, East Lombok Regency. The earthquake was a foreshock to the larger M_{w} 6.9 earthquake which struck the island a week later.

== Tectonic setting ==
Lombok lies on the destructive plate boundary between the Australian plate and the Sunda plate. To the east of Bali the plate boundary starts to involve a collision between the leading edge of the Australian continent and the eastern part of the Sunda Arc and the western end of the Banda Arc. In response to this collision, the arc itself has begun to be pushed over the back-arc Bali Basin along a major thrust fault, the 500 km (310 mi) long Flores Thrust. The Lombok earthquake has been attributed to movement along the Flores Thrust.

== Earthquake ==
The earthquake struck on Sunday, at 06:47 local time, at a shallow depth of 6.4 km (4.0 mi). Residents reported severe shaking near the epicentre, with multiple structures reportedly collapsing. Dozens of houses were destroyed and widespread damage was reported. The shaking lasted 10–20 seconds. Local residents have said it was the strongest quake to have ever hit Lombok. The earthquake was felt as far away as Denpasar, Bali. In Karangasem Regency, Bali, a temple collapsed and a local court was damaged.

Landslides struck the north portion of Mount Rinjani, where routes popular with hiking tourists are located. Authorities confirmed that 826 hikers were trapped on the mountain and waited to be rescued.

In Selong, the capital of East Lombok Regency, dozens of patients were evacuated from dr. Soedjono regional hospital while in Sembalun a Community Health Centre was significantly damaged.

Authorities confirmed that 276 moderate aftershocks from 5.0 to 5.5 Mw} were recorded by the Indonesian Agency for Meteorology, Climatology and Geophysics (BMKG). The largest aftershock at a magnitude 5.7 Mw} recorded at 10:16 local time. On 3 August, officials confirmed that more than 500 aftershocks had been recorded.

== Casualties ==
Authorities confirmed that a Malaysian tourist was killed by a falling wall. The Indonesian National Board for Disaster Management (BNPB) confirmed that 10 people were killed and 40 people were injured. The government confirmed that 18 Malaysians were affected by the earthquake.

On the evening of 29 July, officials announced that the number of people who had been killed by the earthquake had risen to 16. Later the number rose to 17, then 20 on 5 August.

== Aftermath ==
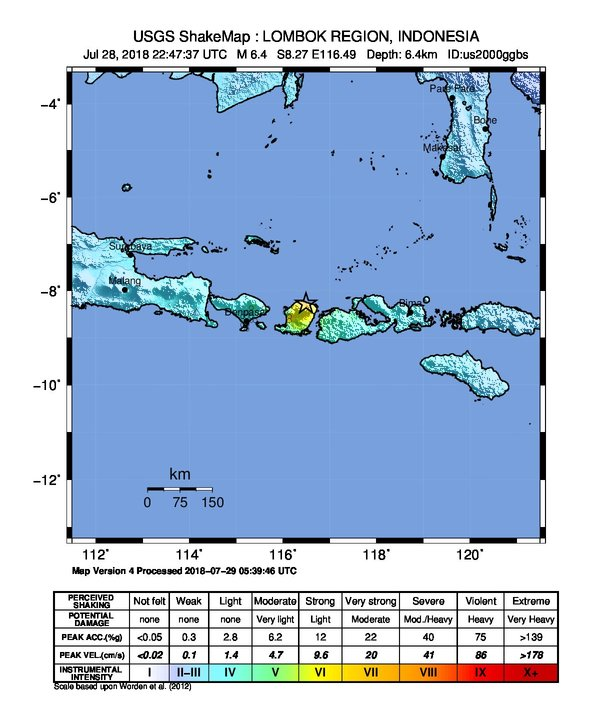
Shakemap for the July 2018 Lombok earthquake.

In the aftermath of the earthquake, blackouts occurred throughout Lombok and telecommunications went down. The National Electricity Company (PLN) stated that they would temporarily cut the electricity in East Lombok Regency for examination. They later announced that normal operation would resume within hours.

The government immediately closed the Mount Rinjani National Park. Hiking and other activities were banned in the area due to fear of landslides. Indonesian President Joko Widodo, who had planned to visit West Nusa Tenggara prior to the earthquake, ordered Muhammad Zainul Majdi, the Governor of West Nusa Tenggara to immediately deploy search and rescue personnel to the affected areas.

Authorities stated on 29 July 2018, that East Lombok Regency had suffered the most damage. Sembalun District and Sambelia District were regarded as the worst affected areas in the regency. Hundreds of tents were set up while dozens of search and rescue personnel, including members from the Indonesian Armed Forces, police and other government institutions, were deployed onto the declared disaster zone. On 29 July 2018, Bali Red Cross announced that they would send medical experts and volunteers to Lombok. Indonesian Social Minister Idrus Marham confirmed that the government would send multiple aids to the victims.

On 30 July, Joko Widodo, the Indonesian President, Muhammad Zainul Majdi the Governor of West Nusa Tenggara, and Idrus Marham, the Social Minister visited survivors and victims of the earthquake and sent condolences to the affected families. Majdi declared a state emergency for three days. They distributed books and other supplies to survivors and later examined the damage. Joko Widodo later announced that the government would help the victims rebuild their houses and infrastructures in Lombok. On 31 July he stated that the government would immediately provide compensation of at least 50 million rupiah for each damaged or destroyed building. The renovation of the damaged buildings would be assisted by the Indonesian National Armed Forces.

Spokesman of the BNPB, Sutopo Purwo Nugroho, stated that more than 1,000 structures across Lombok were either damaged or destroyed. BMKG advised people not to enter their homes as more aftershocks are expected in the following days.

The Malaysian government through their Prime Minister Mahathir Mohamad have announced that aid would be sent to the Indonesian people who were affected by the earthquake, with Mercy Malaysia also began to distribute essential relief items for the victims. The Malaysian Global Peace Mission (GPM) deployed a team to identify the urgent needs of victims, with an initial RM10,000 aid, and an additional RM50,000 brought the following week by a second aid team.

On 5 August 2018 a Mw 6.9 or 7.0 earthquake struck Lombok, prompting tsunami warnings.

=== Search and rescue ===
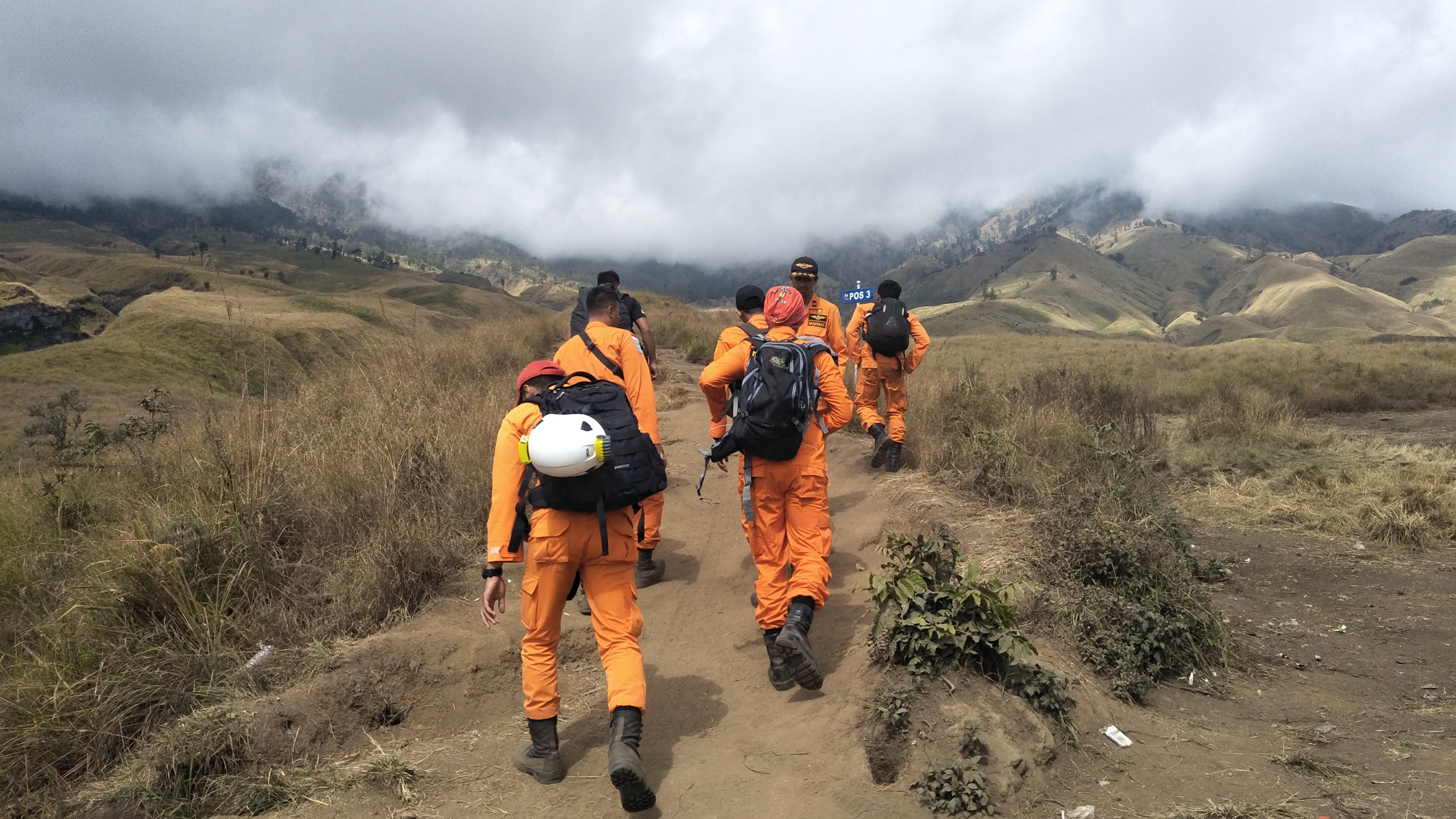
A SAR team at Mount Rinjani

The Indonesian National Search and Rescue Agency (SAR) announced that there were two main locations where trapped hikers were located. The first one was in Segara Anak Lake while the second one was at the basecamp. As of 30 July more than 700 hikers were on the mountain, of whom 100 were from Thailand, the United States, and other countries. SAR stated that they had prepared two helicopters for the evacuation process and that at least 500 hikers had been evacuated from the mountain.

There were confusions among officials on the number of hikers on the mountain, as it was reported that most hikers were not registered by their tour guides. Several media stated that around 600 hikers were on the mountain, while another stated that there were around 500 people. Officials later finalized the total number to more than 1,200 hikers of whom around 700 of them were foreigners from 26 countries, the majority are Thais. Government officials stated that around 300 Thais were on the mountain during the disaster.

On 1 August, all 1,226 hikers had been rescued from the mountain.
