= Suela =

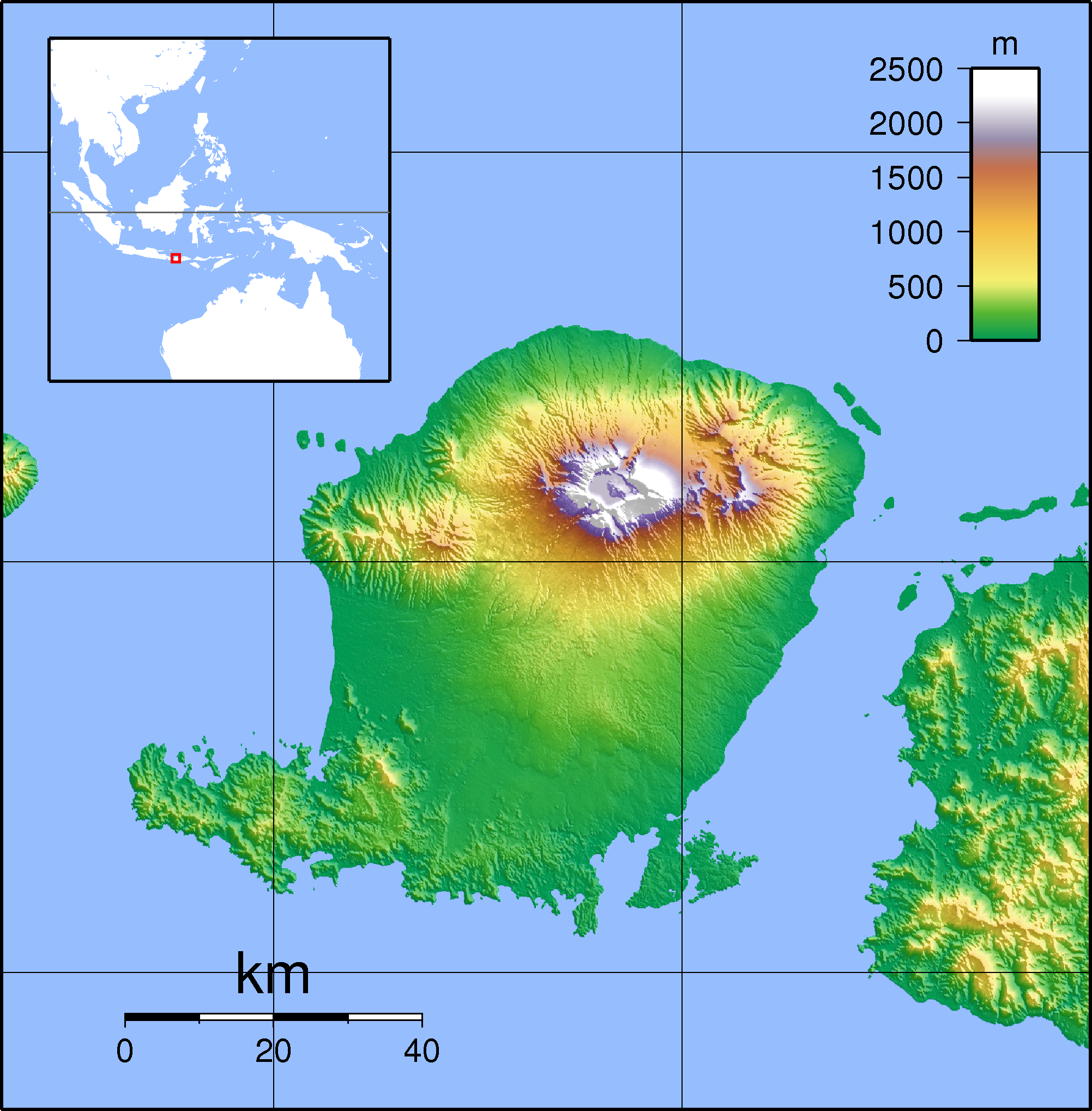
- Location on Lombok Island, Indonesia
- Coordinates: 8.5234885306°S 116.5738483889°E
- Country: Indonesia
- Province: West Nusa Tenggara
- Regency: East Lombok

Area
  - Total: 115.01 km^{2} (44.41 sq mi)

Population (mid 2025 estimate)
  - Total: 49,820
  - Density: 433.2/km^{2} (1,122/sq mi)
- Time zone: UTC+8 (WITA)
- Postal Code: 83655
- Vehicle registration: DR

Suela is an administrative district (kecamatan) in East Lombok Regency of West Nusa Tenggara Province of Indonesia. As of 2025, it had the population of 49,820.
