= Masbateño =

Masbateño may refer to:

- Masbateño people, from the Masbate island in the Philippines
- Masbateño language, their Austronesian language

== See also ==
- Masbate (disambiguation)
