= 5 August 2018 Lombok earthquake =

Earthquake in Indonesia

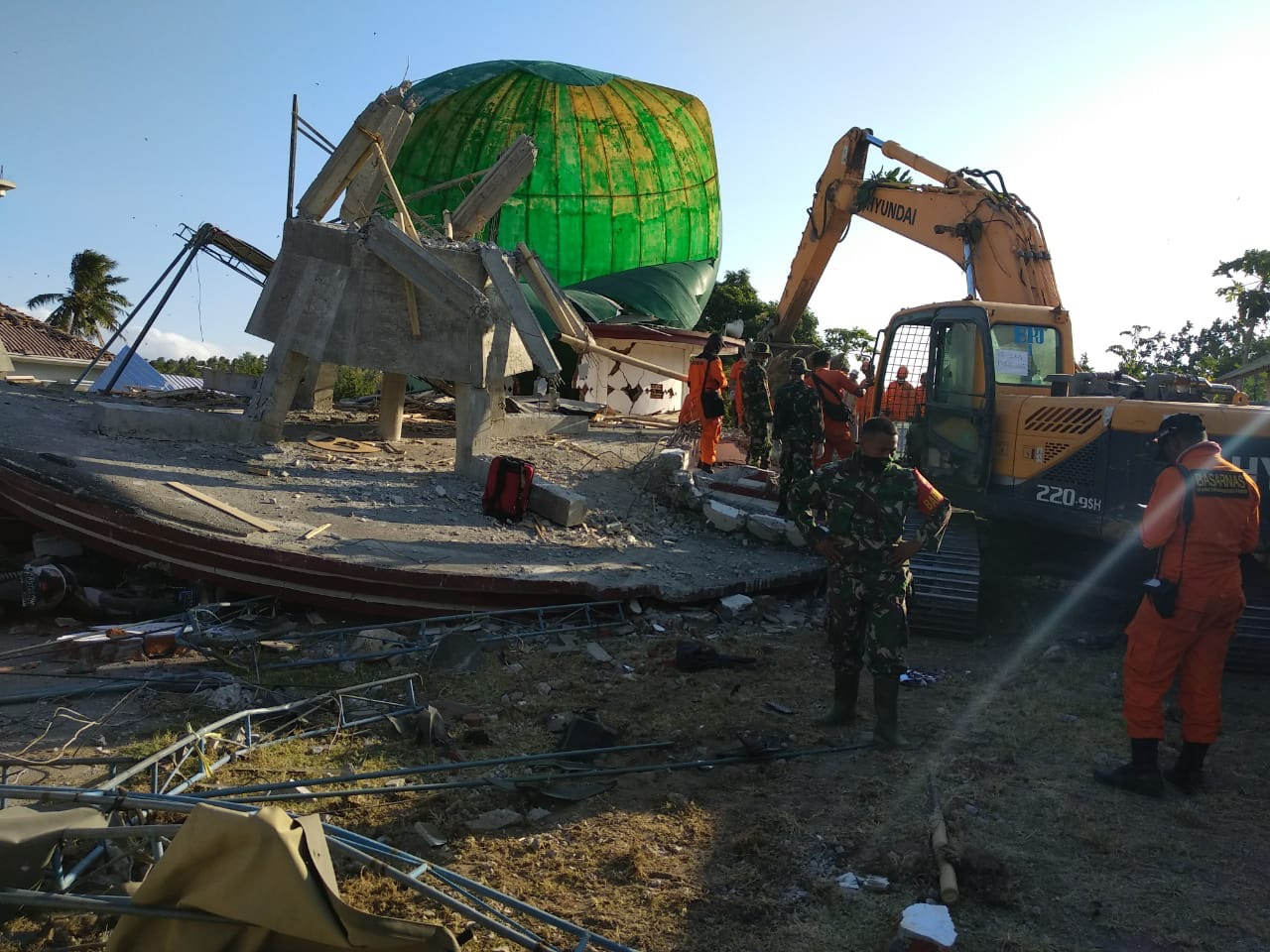
- A collapsed mosque in North Lombok

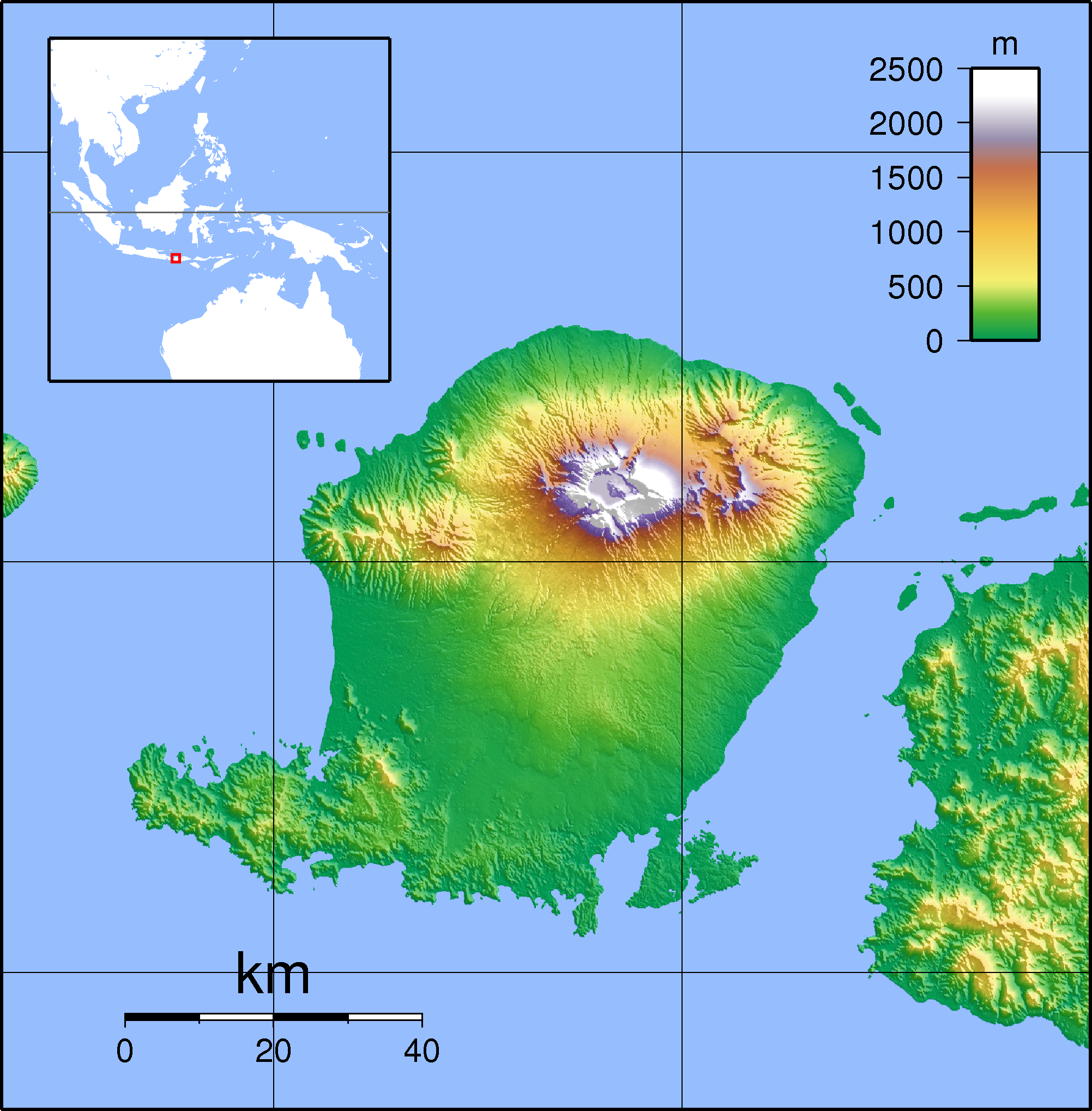
- Location within Lombok Location within Lesser Sunda Islands Location within Indonesia
- UTC time: 2018-08-05 11:46:38
- ISC event: 612456510
- USGS-ANSS: ComCat
- Local date: 5 August 2018
- Local time: 19:46:38 (WITA)
- Magnitude: 6.9 M_{w} 7.0 M_{L}
- Depth: 34.0 km (21.1 mi)
- Epicenter: 8.287°S 116.452°E
- Fault: Flores back-arc thrust fault
- Type: Thrust
- Areas affected: Bali and West Nusa Tenggara, Indonesia
- Total damage: 8.8 trilion rupiah (US$607 million)
- Max. intensity: MMI VIII (Severe)
- Tsunami: 2 m (6.6 ft)
- Landslides: Yes
- Foreshocks: 6.4 M_{w} 28 July 2018 22:47:37 (UTC); 29 July 2018 06:47:37 (WITA)
- Aftershocks: 6.3 M_{w} 19 August 2018 04:10:22 (UTC); 663 total aftershocks
- Casualties: 563 dead, +1,000 injured (includes casualties from all of the earthquakes that affected Lombok in August)

On 5 August 2018, a destructive and shallow earthquake measuring M_{w} 6.9 (M_{L} 7.0 according to BMKG) struck the island of Lombok, Indonesia. It was the main shock following its foreshock, a nearby M_{w} 6.4 earthquake on 29 July. It was followed by a nearby 6.9 earthquake on 19 August 2018.

The epicentre was located inland, near Loloan Village in North Lombok Regency. The fault rupture spread to the north and reached the sea, creating tsunamis. Severe shaking was reported throughout the island, while strong shaking was reported on the neighboring islands of Bali and Sumbawa.

Widespread damage was reported in Lombok and Bali. Officials stated that at least 80% of the structures in North Lombok were damaged or destroyed. In the aftermath of the sequence of earthquakes in August, a total of 563 people were confirmed killed while more than 1,000 were confirmed injured. More than 417,000 people were displaced.

This earthquake is the largest and the strongest earthquake to have hit Lombok in recorded history. With more than 560 deaths, it is also the deadliest earthquake in the Lesser Sunda Islands since the 1992 Flores earthquake and tsunami. The earthquake later caused chains of earthquakes in West Nusa Tenggara with significant magnitude, which was deemed by officials as a rare event.

== Tectonic setting ==
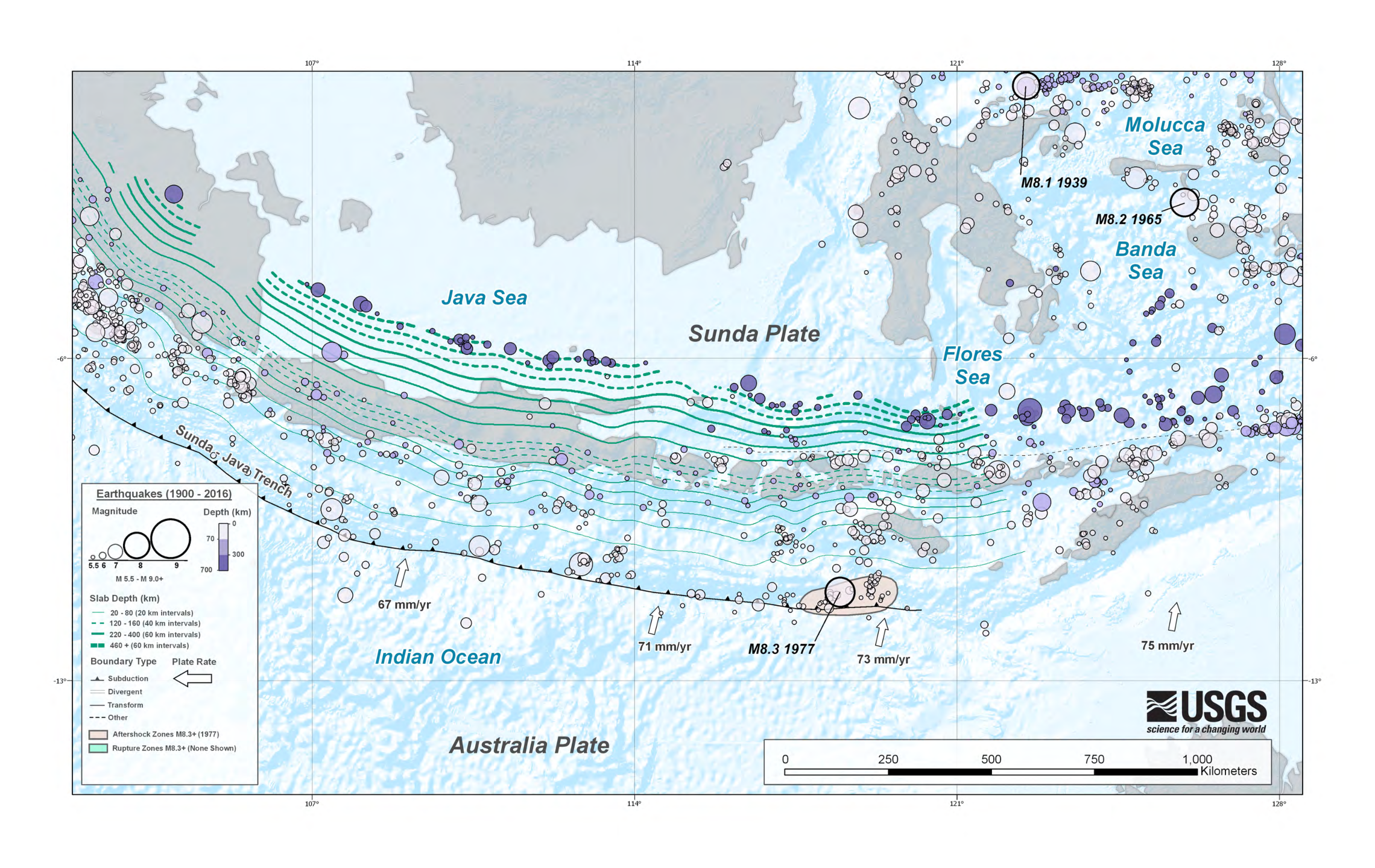
Tectonic setting of the region.

Indonesia lies on the Pacific Ring of Fire, an area of significant volcanic and tectonic activity. In particular, the archipelago is located between the Eurasian, Pacific and Australian tectonic plates. The Australian plate subducts beneath the Sunda plate at 50–75 mm (1.97–2.95 in) a year, forming the Sunda Trench. This activity caused the M_{w} 9.2 2004 Indian Ocean earthquake and tsunami, one of the strongest and most deadly earthquakes in recorded history.

Lombok in particular lies on the destructive plate boundary between the Australian plate and the Sunda plate. To the east of Bali, the plate boundary starts to involve a collision between the leading edge of the Australian continent and the eastern part of the Sunda Arc and the western end of the Banda Arc, also known as the Flores Back Arc Thrust Zone. The Sunda Arc has produced a large number of powerful and devastating earthquakes in the past, including the 1977 Sumba earthquake, 1994 Java earthquake and the 2006 Pangandaran earthquake and tsunami. In addition, the island also lies between two major geomagnetic anomalies of opposite signs. The Flores Back Arc Thrust system had in the past century produced at least 4 earthquakes stronger than M_{w} 6.5 in the region: a M_{w} 6.5 event in Bali to the west in 1976, alongside three events (M_{w} 6.5, 6.5, 6.6 in 2007 and 2009) in Sumbawa to the east.

The North Lombok area, where the earthquake occurred, has a track record of earthquakes in the past. One M_{w} 6.4 earthquake in 1979 killed 37 people, with a more recent M_{w} 5.7 event in 2013 causing extensive damage but no deaths. Simulations by scientists from the University of Mataram suggested that an earthquake stronger than M_{w} 6.0 could cause a small tsunami which would be 13–20 cm (5–8 in) in height, reaching Mataram within 18–20 minutes after the earthquake.

Geologically, the rocks close to the epicenter are primarily Tertiary to Quaternary volcanic sediments, with pre-Tertiary to Tertiary sedimentary and metamorphic rock. These soft rocks are thought to have caused an increase in the intensity of the earthquake.

== Earthquake ==
Map of 2018 Lombok earthquakes

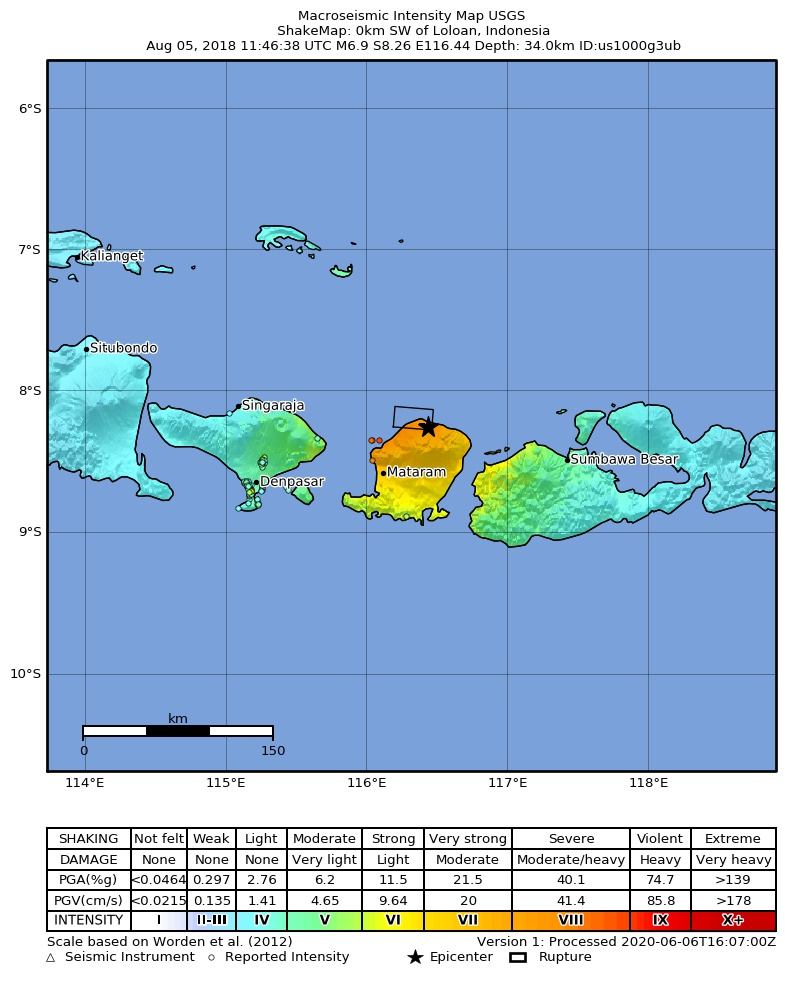
USGS Shakemap for the August 2018 Lombok earthquake.

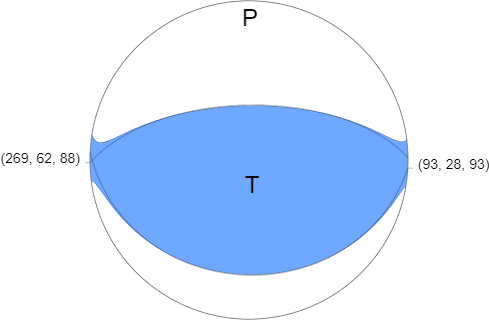
Focal mechanism of the earthquake by the USGS.

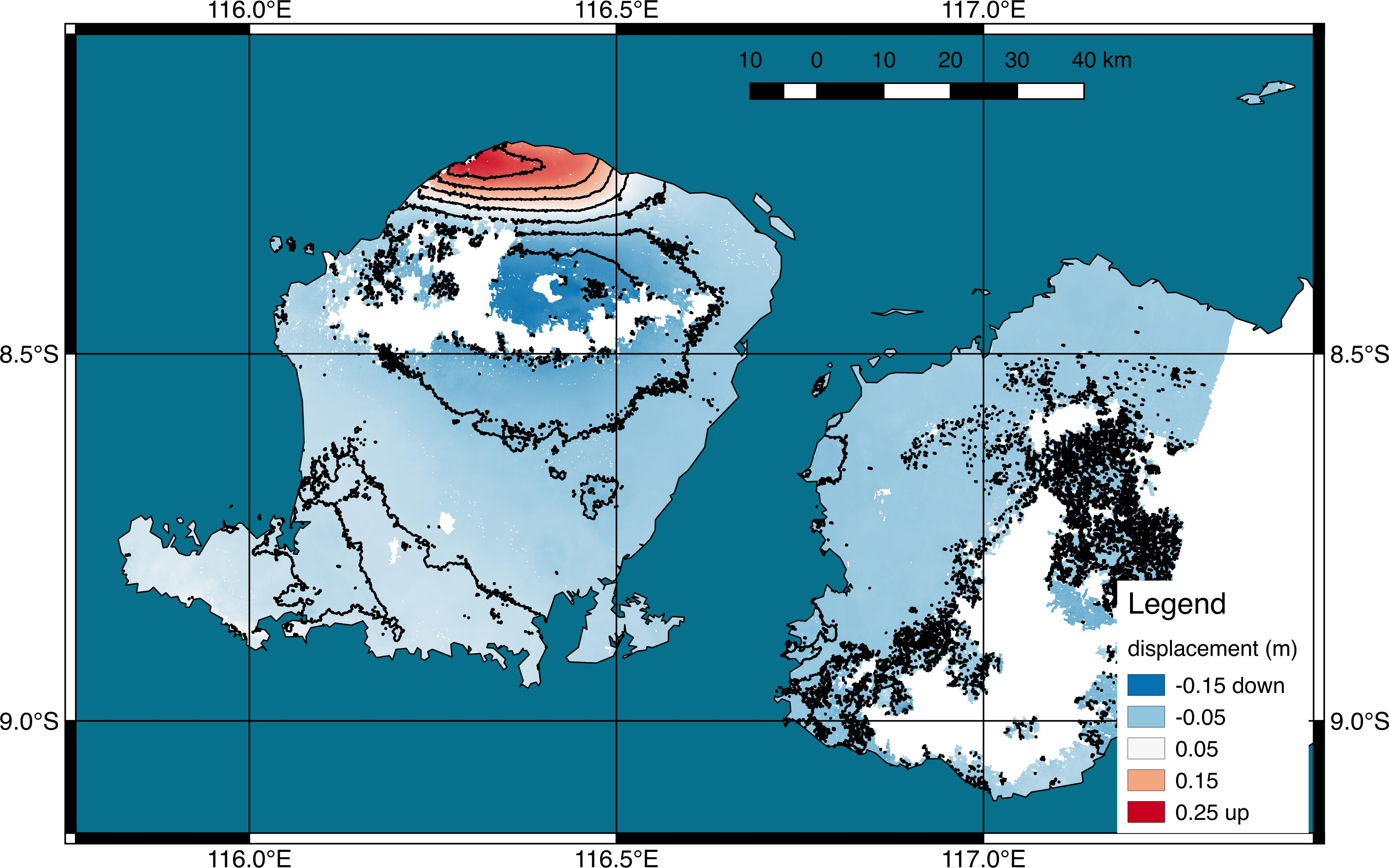
Ground shift due to the earthquake.

The earthquake occurred on 19:46 local time, at a depth of 34.0 km (21.1 mi) (USGS) or 15.0 km (9.3 mi) (BMKG). Shaking was felt as far away as Sumbawa in the east and Trenggalek Regency in the west. Shaking was also felt in Pacitan Regency, East Java. The Indonesian Agency for Meteorology, Climatology and Geophysics (BMKG) stated that the epicentre of the earthquake was located inland, on the northeastern slopes of Mount Rinjani at 8.37°S 116.48°E. It initially measured the earthquake's magnitude at M_{w} 6.8, before revising it to 7.0. The United States Geological Survey initially measured the earthquake at M_{w} 7.0, before revising it down to 6.9. It placed the epicenter at 8.287°S 116.451°E, somewhat north of the BMKG estimate.

Caused by a shallow thrust fault on or near the Flores Back Arc Thrust, at which the Australian and Sunda plates underthrusts the Indonesian volcanic island arcs, the earthquake struck just a week after the magnitude 6.4 earthquake which had killed 20. According to BMKG, this earthquake was a foreshock to the M_{w} 6.9 earthquake. Despite the earthquake, no increase in activity was recorded for the nearby volcanoes of Rinjani and Agung. At certain areas in the northwestern parts of the island, the earthquake caused the ground to rise by as much as 25 centimetres (9.8 in).

The earthquake interrupted a ministerial security council held in Mataram, which was attended by Indonesian ministers Yasonna Laoly and Wiranto, Australian minister Peter Dutton, New Zealand minister Andrew Little, and Singaporean minister K. Shanmugam. Immediately following the earthquake, many residents evacuated to local mosques in fear of aftershocks.

Days following the earthquake, scientists from NASA and California Institute of Technology published a satellite image of the ground shift in Lombok. The image showed that the area in the earthquake's rupture had been lifted by 25 cm. Several portions of North Lombok were raised by 5–10 cm. The area which was located on the south of the rupture however had a decrease on its height, including Mount Rinjani which had lost 15 cm due to the earthquake.

=== Impact ===
Modified Mercalli intensities in selected locations
MMI VIII (Severe)	Mataram	1.14 million
MMI VII (Very strong)	Labuhan Lombok	936,000
MMI VI (Strong)	Bima	1.45 million
MMI V (Moderate)	Negara	4.12 million
MMI IV (Light)	Situbondo	18.7 million

As the earthquake occurred at a relatively shallow depth and a 7 magnitude, the earthquake caused severe shaking in the island of Lombok and strong shaking in the neighboring islands. Indonesian officials released maps of the perceived shaking. The largest city in Lombok and the provincial capital, Mataram, recorded a maximum intensity of VIII (Severe). The strongest shaking felt in the island of Bali was in Karangasem Regency with an intensity of VI (strong) while, on the island of Sumbawa, the strongest shaking was felt in Bima with a recorded maximum intensity of VI (strong).

=== Tsunami ===
Following the earthquake, a tsunami warning was issued by BMKG for the North coast of Lombok. With a maximum expected height of just 50 cm (20 in), the tsunami struck at three locations, the maximum of which was at 13.5 cm (5.3 in) in Carik, North Lombok, and the warning was removed later. However, the warning had caused panic as the residents attempted to evacuate to higher ground. In Gili Trawangan, residents and tourists were evacuated to the hills in expectation of a tsunami. In Gili Air and Gili Meno there are no hills, so locals waited in expectation of a tsunami in the small islands' open fields. A tsunami somewhat larger than what BKMG expected hit Kayangan, with a height of 2 m (6 ft).

=== Aftershocks ===
By 18 August, the BMKG had reported as many as 664 aftershocks, most of which were below M_{w} 5.9 magnitude.

There were two major aftershocks. The first one occurred on 9 August at 13:25 local time. It struck the island of Lombok at a depth of 12 km and measured at M_{w} 5.9 (USGS) or M_{L} 6.2 (BMKG), and was felt as far away as East Java. Shaking was felt in the neighboring islands of Bali and Sumbawa and lasted for at least 10 seconds. Officials stated that the intensity of the shaking in Lombok was V-VI MMI (medium-strong). Panicked residents ran out to the streets. Dozens of buildings which had been badly damaged by the mainshock reportedly collapsed. Widespread damage was also reported in West Nusa Tenggara's provincial capital Mataram. There were also reports of landslides which buried at least 4 people in Gangga-Kayangan area, Rescue efforts were abruptly stopped due to the earthquake. Authorities confirmed that 24 people were injured and 6 were killed, including two volunteers from the Indonesian Red Cross, by the 9 August aftershock.

The second one occurred on 18 August at 23:10 local time. The earthquake was measured at M_{w} 6.3 (USGS) or M_{L} 6.5 (BMKG). It struck at a depth of 7.9 km. 4 minutes earlier, a 5.4 magnitude earthquake had just struck Lombok. There were reports of landslides in Mount Rinjani. There were 2 deaths.

== Casualties ==
As of 25 August 563 people had been confirmed killed by the 5 August and subsequent events. Most victims were killed by falling debris due to collapsed buildings. Deaths occurred in all regencies and cities on the island – with most of the deaths being in North Lombok Regency. Of the 563 deaths in Lombok, 471 were in North Lombok, 45 in West Lombok (including 7 in the Gili Islands), 12 in Mataram, 26 in East Lombok and 2 in Central Lombok Regency. Officials confirmed that 2 people had been killed in Bali, both were in Denpasar while 58 people in Bali were injured. All killed by the earthquake were Indonesian citizens.

Hundreds of people were injured, overloading the capacity of medical sites and forcing them to be treated outside. Many injuries were also reported in Karangasem Regency, the easternmost part of neighboring Bali.

On 6 August at 07:45 local time, the regent of North Lombok Regency, Najmul Akhyar, confirmed on live television that the death toll had risen to more than 100, as reports from his districts revealed that at least 5 people had been killed in each district. At 10:00 a.m local time, the Head of Data, Information and Public Relations Center of BNPB, Sutopo Purwo Nugroho, said in a press conference that at least 91 people had been killed, all Indonesians, while 209 people were seriously wounded in the earthquake.

Later that afternoon, Sutopo revised the death toll to 98 people as another 7 bodies were recovered from the West Lombok Regency while the number of injured was raised to 236. He added that the current death toll is not final and more information will come from the villages that are cut off by the earthquake.

There were many reports of collapsed mosques in Lombok. As the earthquake struck during isha prayer, many people were trapped after the mosques they were in collapsed onto them. In Lading-Lading village, North Lombok Regency, more than 50 people were trapped inside the Jabal Nur Mosque, while some local residents stated that there were hundreds. Dozens of people were also reportedly trapped inside the Jamiul Jamaah Mosque in Karangtangsor Village. On 7 August, officials announced that they had rescued one worshipper from the rubble, who was found alive by the rescuers. Three bodies were also recovered during the search and rescue operation.

On 8 August, the death toll was raised by the Indonesian National Disaster Management Board to 131 as more bodies were retrieved by rescue workers. Data assessment conducted by authorities revealed that more than 1,470 people had been seriously wounded and more than 165,000 people had been displaced by the earthquake. He added that there were still some areas that couldn't be reached by rescuers.

On 18 August 469 people were confirmed dead. Authorities, however, warned that the death toll may rise. On 25 August, the Indonesian Ministry of Social Affairs confirmed that 565 people had been killed by all of the August tremors.

== Damage ==
Widespread damage was reported in Lombok Island. Officials stated that structures in North Lombok Regency, in which the epicentre of the earthquake was located, reportedly suffered the greatest damage. Telecommunications went down and blackouts were reported throughout Lombok. Thousands of houses were damaged, many of which had already been struck by the foreshock. A lack of construction regulations and technical knowledge of builders regarding earthquake resistance, coupled with low economic ability, exacerbated the damage. At least three bridges reportedly had collapsed in Lombok.

Immediately after the earthquake, most of Mataram lost electrical power. Although some parts of Lombok still received electricity, the load was only 50 MW compared to the normal 220 MW. Streets were jammed across Lombok as traffic lights were unusable and roads were blocked by debris. The Indonesian National Electricity Company (PLN) stated that electricity had been restored in major parts of Lombok hours after the quake, even though around 25% of the area in Lombok hadn't been restored.

In Gili Trawangan, severe damage was reported to the island's cafes and resorts. As multiple convenience stores were abandoned by their owners, cases of looting were widely reported across the island.

Significant damage was widely reported in Bali. In Kuta, wall collapses were reported in two department stores. Several temples were also damaged by the quake. The ceiling of Ngurah Rai International Airport was damaged although the airport remained operational. Terminal facilities of the Lombok International Airport were also slightly damaged, but the runway, taxiway and apron were undamaged and remained operational. Bali – Lombok ferry services, however, were temporarily terminated. Ferry services returned to normal operation on 6 August. On 6 August, during a press conference, Sutopo stated that a preliminary report suggests that more than 50% of structures in North Lombok Regency had been devastated by the earthquake. West Nusa Tenggara Governor Muhammad Zainul Majdi later stated that more than 80% of structures in North Lombok Regency had either been damaged or destroyed.

Preliminary analysis conducted by the Indonesian National Board for Disaster Management showed that the earthquake managed to inflict more than 5 trillion rupiah (US$342 million) in damage. This total damage was also added by the damage that had been inflicted by the foreshock. Damage was revised to 8.8 trillion rupiah (US$607 million) by late August. On 8 August, it was announced that 42,239 houses and 458 schools had been either damaged or destroyed by the earthquake.

== Aftermath ==
=== Refugees ===
Following the earthquake, some local residents, especially in North Lombok, set up makeshift camps to accommodate those displaced by the damage. The refugees reported a lack of blankets, tents and foodstuffs. Non-perishable food items such as instant noodles and bread were reportedly out of stock as residents stockpiled food. In order to supply the refugees with clean water, the Indonesian government drilled wells for groundwater. BNPB estimated that over 165,000 people had been displaced due to the earthquake, out of the island's population of around 3 million. By 11 August, the total figure has been raised to over 387,000. The provincial capital Mataram recorded 20,343 displaced people, with the West and East Lombok regencies recording 91,372 and 76,506 refugees respectively. The hardest-hit part of North Lombok reported 198,846 people in refugee camps – from a population of about 215,000.

=== Response ===
Indonesian President Joko Widodo immediately phoned the Governor of West Nusa Tenggara, Muhammad Zainul Majdi, and ordered him to observe the situation in Lombok. He later extended his condolences to the affected. During a press conference in East Jakarta, he ordered airliners and officials to add flights and assistance for tourists who were leaving from Lombok due to the earthquake. In response to this, Lombok International Airport operated for 24 hours until 9 August. Director of Angkasa Pura I Faik Fahmi stated that extra flights will be added in Lombok.

The Governor of West Nusa Tenggara, Muhammad Zainul Majdi, who had just attended a ministerial meeting in Lombok, immediately visited the survivors of the quake in Lombok and decided to extend the state of emergency and to dismiss staff and students from every school in Lombok. As more casualties were brought in, he urged Indonesians to donate blood as there were fears on decreasing bloodstock.

Multiple regional governments sent logistics and aid to the impacted areas. The regional government of West Sumatra sent 1 ton of rendang to the affected families. The Acehnese government held a fundraising for the victims, later stated that a total of 300 million rupiah had been collected, while the government of West Java sent a total fund of 3.5 billion rupiah to the affected families. The regional government of Jambi held a solidarity act and a fundraising for the victims. The regional government of South Sulawesi sent medical team and volunteers to Lombok. They also stated that they would send logistics and approximately 100 blankets to Lombok. Government of Central Java sent logistics and aid worth of 150 million rupiah and 25 personnel from Central Java's Disaster Mitigation Agency. Government of East Java also sent 18 personnel, including medics and members of the government's social department, and also logistics and medicines to Lombok.

The Minister of Religious Affairs Lukman Hakim Saifuddin asked Indonesians, including those who were attending the Hajj, to pray for the affected families. Deputy speaker of the People's Representative Council Fahri Hamzah, who was elected from West Nusa Tenggara and had just sent aid for the foreshock earlier the same day, called for donations and aid to be sent to the impacted areas, and for the earthquake to be declared a national disaster. The Indonesian Minister of Agriculture Andi Amran Sulaiman sent 10 billion rupiah to the victims of the quake, collected from the ministry and including a year of his own salary. Indonesian Minister of Education and Culture Muhadjir Effendy sent tents and school supplies to the survivors, added that he had dispatched his staff to assess the total number of schools that had been damaged or destroyed by the earthquake, and that the ministry had coordinated with trauma healing team to treat traumatized survivors. He announced that more temporary schools would be opened in Lombok in response to the calls from the Indonesian Child Protection Commission. Minister of Social Affairs Idrus Marham sent 3,000 units of sembako and urged every regents and mayors in Lombok to declare a state of emergency in order to receive food protection and to prevent food shortage in the island. BNPB spokesman Sutopo stated that the government's resources were "adequate" for earthquake relief up to recovery, though he added that any international aid would be welcomed.

Head of the Indonesian Prosperous Justice Party Sohibul Iman sent his condolences to the victims and urged the party's cadres to assist the victims in Lombok. The Central Java branch of the party later deployed a total of 1,166 volunteers, including medics, to the impacted areas. Indonesian NasDem Party also sent 66 medics to Lombok. Secretary General of the Indonesian Democratic Party of Struggle Hasto Kristiyanto stated that his party had sent approximately 1,000 volunteers. The head of the National Awakening Party Muhaimin Iskandar immediately ordered the party's cadres to help the victims in Lombok. The party also started a fundraising for the affected. According to the party's Vice Secretary General Luluk Nur Hamidah, approximately a total of 228 million rupiah had been collected in 24 hours. The United Development Party sent donations, volunteers and logistics to the survivors of the earthquake. The West Java branch of the nation's third largest party Golkar created a fundraising program for the survivors and sent cadres to Lombok. Head of the Golkar's West Java's Regional Representative Council Dedi Mulyadi stated that a total of 500 million rupiah had been collected. The party also sent 2,000 units of sembako and medicines to Lombok.

Facebook activated its safety check in response to the earthquake.

Solidarity acts, including benefit concerts, charity runs and fundraising, were held across the country. In the aftermath of the disaster, students and people from various organisation across the country went to the street and asked for donations from motorists. A group of singers, including Krisdayanti, Ruth Sahanaya, Dorce Gamalama, Paramitha Rusady, Iis Sugianto, Harvey Malaiholo, Ita Purnamasari, Nia Daniati, Roni Sianturi, and other senior artists, held a benefit concert on 10 August in Bekasi. A hundred million rupiah was reportedly collected from the concert. The Elek Yo group band, which is a band consisting of Indonesian ministers such as Indonesian Minister of Finance Sri Mulyani, Minister of Foreign Affairs Retno Marsudi, Minister of Transportation Budi Karya Sumadi, Minister of Public Works and Public Housing Basuki Hadimuljono, and Minister of Manpower Hanif Dhakiri, also held a benefit concert in Jakarta. A total of 2.2 billion rupiah had been collected from the concert. Transportation Minister Budi Karya Sumadi later sold his guitar for 200 million rupiah, which would be used for the victims of the quake. The Indonesian National Armed Forces – Mandalika International Marathon held a 7K charity run in Jakarta on 12 August.

During the opening ceremony of the 2018 Asian Games, a moment of silence was held for the victims of the earthquake.

On 6 August, the Indonesian National Armed Forces deployed KRI Dr. Soeharso, a hospital ship, multiple aircraft carrying medical supplies, aid and troops to the impacted areas. Medical units of the Indonesian Marine Corps and Kostrad were also dispatched to the impacted areas, in addition to civilian medical personnel under the Ministry of Social Affairs.

The Indonesian National Lines (Pelni) on 6 August announced provision of free ferry services for humanitarian purposes. Logistics and aid was also to be provided by the state-owned company. Indonesia Red Cross dispatched its medical personnel and around 26 tonnes of aid to the impacted areas, consisting of 2,000 tarpaulins, 2,000 blankets and 2,000 mattresses. Pertamina sent LPG and gasoline to Lombok and announced that the stock for gasoline and LPG are "enough". They added that they had also sent 1,5 liters of mineral water. Indonesian state-owned postal service Pos Indonesia announced that any kind of logistic or aids will be fee-free until 31 August.

=== Search and rescue ===
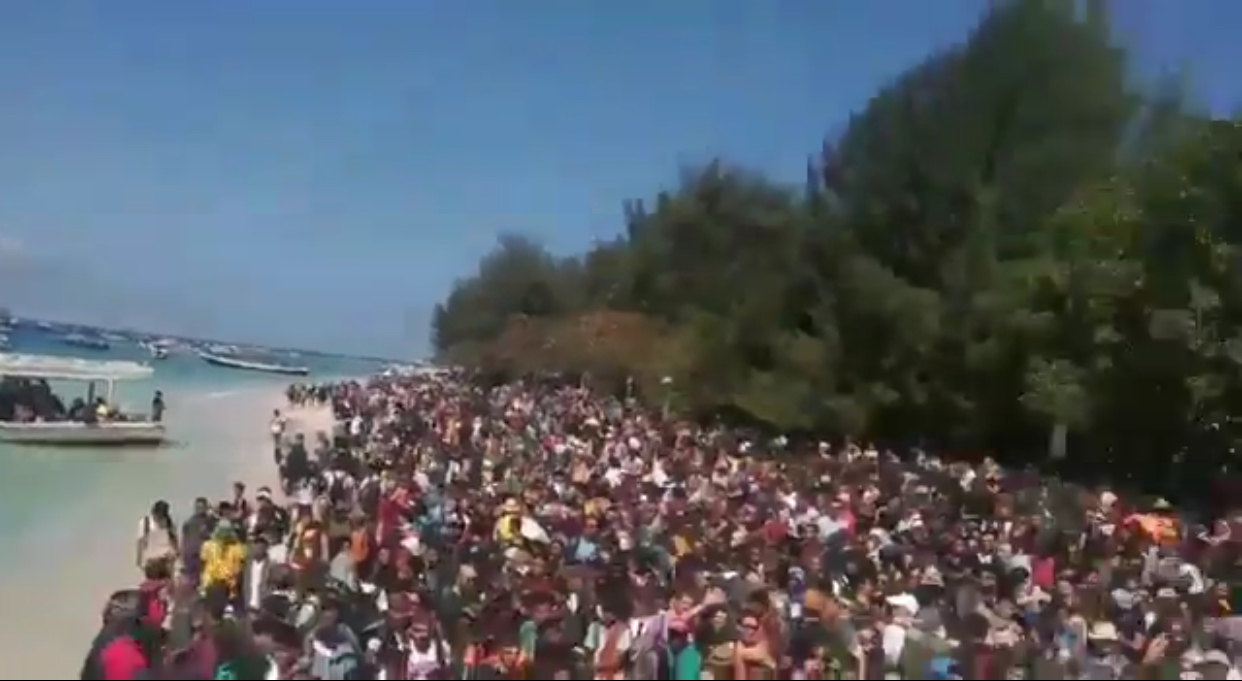
Tourists crowding the beach of Gili Trawangan to be evacuated.

The Indonesian Government confirmed that more than 1,000 people were trapped in Gili Islands, consisting of approximately 700 local residents and 1,000 tourists, and added that ships had been deployed to evacuate them from the area. Major damage was reported in Gili Trawangan. The search and rescue operation was severely hampered by blackouts, lack of heavy equipment and downed telecommunication lines.

Tourists reported that there was no coordination among the authorities during the evacuation process in Gili Islands and no information was given in English. They also reported that authorities and rescuers forced tourists to pay for the rescue boats, which led to outrage. BNPB officials confirmed the report, saying that some parties demanded Rp 2 million (US$140) to transport stranded tourists to the airport. Reports also stated that the rescuers chose the highest bidders to be evacuated first from the island, and that locals were evacuated first, leaving foreigners for later. By afternoon on 7 August, 4,636 local and foreign tourists had been evacuated to the ports of Bangsal, Lembar and Benoa.

The Coordinating Minister of Politics, Legal and Security Affairs Wiranto was ordered to coordinate the management of the disaster response. President of Indonesia Joko Widodo also ordered all ranks in major Indonesian public institutions, including the Indonesian National Police and officials from the Ministry of Social Affairs to coordinate with the emergency response.

=== International ===
United States Secretary of State Mike Pompeo, who met Joko Widodo in Jakarta the morning before the earthquake, expressed his condolences and stated that "we are closely monitoring the aftermath". Australian Foreign Minister Julie Bishop visited Bali and stated that the Australian Consulate-General in Bali had opened a hotline number for Australians. She stated that staff from the Australian Department of Foreign Affairs and Trade had been dispatched to assess the number of Australians who were affected by the quake. She added that the Australian government had sent logistics to the affected families through the Indonesian Red Cross. Malaysian Prime Minister Mahathir Mohamad called Joko Widodo to express his condolences and sympathy for the earthquake. In addition to extending condolences, the Singaporean government donated US$100,000 on top of a SGD 50,000 donation by the Singapore Red Cross. The latter also planned to deploy volunteers to Lombok. In a telegram, Pope Francis offered his "heartfelt solidarity" and encouraged rescue workers and other assistance to the victims. Japanese Prime Minister Shinzo Abe and Japanese Foreign Minister Tarō Kōno both sent their condolences to Indonesia and stated that the Japanese Government will be ready if there are any request for assistance from Indonesia. Russian president Vladimir Putin also sent a telegram offering his condolences. The Saudi government, which cited Khadim ul-Haramain us-Sharifain, King Salman bin Abdulaziz Al Saud and Prince Mohammed bin Salman bin Abdulaziz Al Saud, also sent their condolences to Indonesia.

In response to the earthquakes on 29 July and 5 August, the Australian, British, Chinese, Malaysian and Singaporean governments issued a travel advisory for their citizens who were intending to visit Lombok. The Malaysian Embassy also set up an operations room to assist its nationals who were affected by the earthquake. Taiwanese President Tsai Ing-wen stated that "Taiwan stands ready to help our Indonesian friends at this difficult time" with an offer of assistance to the Indonesian government are being proposed the following day. On 8 August, the Taiwanese government decide to donate US$250,000 in aid to the earthquake victims. The European Union offered aid worth of €150,000 to Indonesia for the emergency response. On 14 August, the European Union announced that a further €500,000 would be provided. The Spanish Government provided a total of €100,000 and the Netherlands provided a total of €500,000.

== See also ==
- List of earthquakes in 2018
- List of earthquakes in Indonesia
