= Lenek =

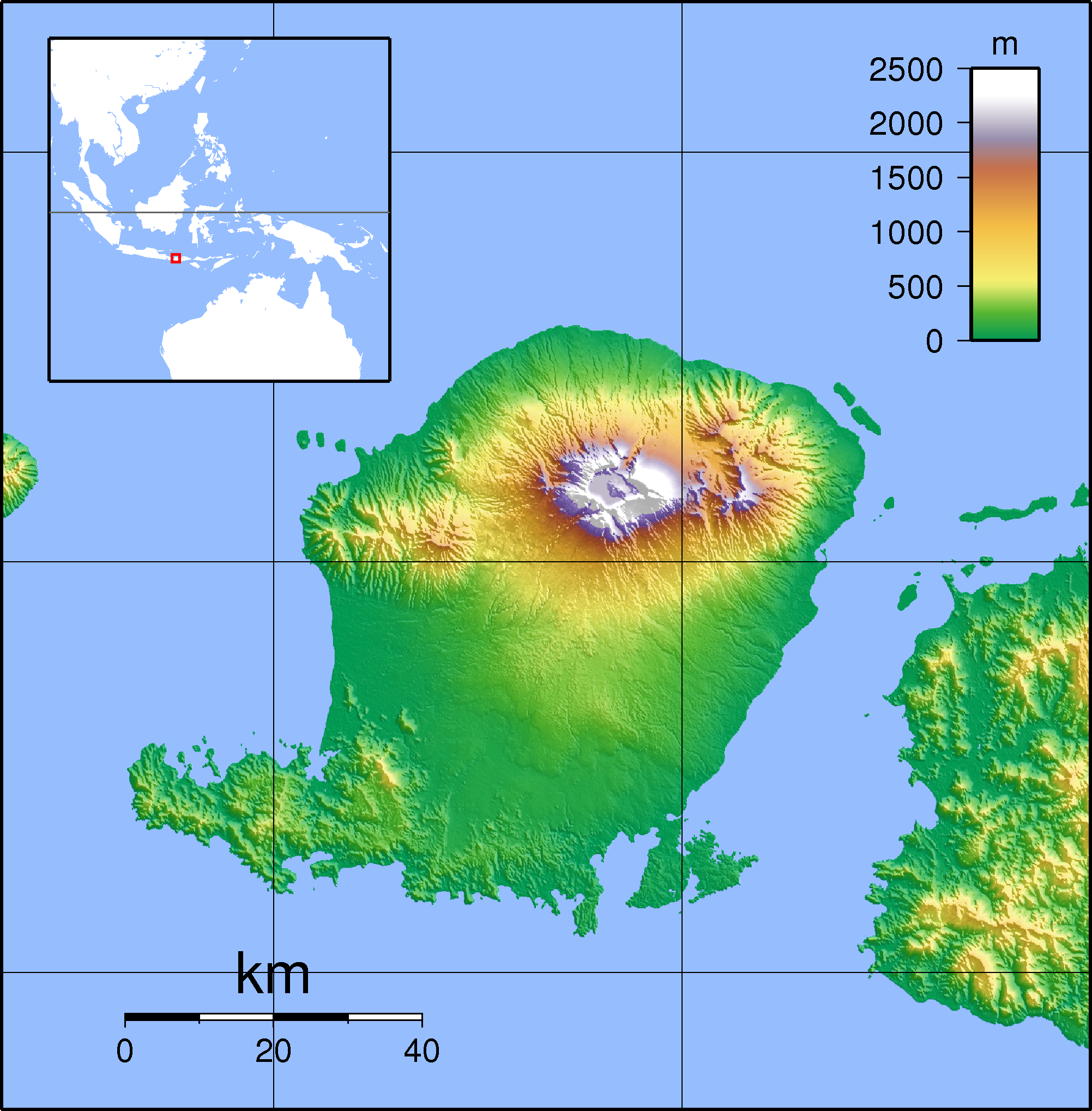
- Location on Lombok Island, Indonesia
- Coordinates: 8.5845121306°S 116.5103947889°E
- Country: Indonesia
- Province: West Nusa Tenggara
- Regency: East Lombok
- Established: 2017

Area
  - Total: 47.87 km^{2} (18.48 sq mi)

Population (mid 2025)
  - Total: 49,539
  - Density: 1,035/km^{2} (2,680/sq mi)
- Time zone: UTC+8 (WITA)
- Postal Code: 83653
- Vehicle registration: DR

Lenek is an administrative district (kecamatan) in East Lombok Regency, of West Nusa Tenggara Province, Indonesia.
