= Sakra District =

Sakra
- District
- Interactive map of Sakra
- Country: Indonesia
- Province: West Nusa Tenggara
- Regency: East Lombok

Area
  - Total: 25.09 km^{2} (9.69 sq mi)

Population (mid 2025)
  - Total: 69,604
  - Density: 2,774/km^{2} (7,185/sq mi)

Sakra is an administrative district (kecamatan) in East Lombok Regency, within West Nusa Tenggara Province of Indonesia. It comprises 12 rural villages (desa) - Kabar, Keselet, Kuang Baru, Moyot, Peresak, Rumbuk, Rumbuk Timur, Sakra, Sakra Selatan, Songak, Suangi and Suwangi Timur.
