= Masbate language =

Masbate language may refer to:

- Masbateño language (Visayan)
- Masbate Sorsogon language (Bikol)
