= Masbagik =

- District
- Interactive map of Masbagik
- Country: Indonesia
- Province: West Nusa Tenggara
- Regency: East Lombok

Area
  - Total: 33.17 km^{2} (12.81 sq mi)

Population (mid 2025)
  - Total: 117,446
  - Density: 3,541/km^{2} (9,170/sq mi)

Masbagik is a town and an administrative district (kecamatan) in East Lombok, West Nusa Tenggara, Indonesia. The district covers a land area of 33.17 km^{2} and had a population of 117,446 in mid 2025. It is sub-divided into 10 nominally rural villages (desa), namely those of Danger, Kesik, Kumbang, Lendang Nangka, Lendang Nangka Utara, Masbagik Selatan, Masbagik Timur, Masbagik Utara, Masbagik Utara Baru and Paok Motong.
