= Selong =

City in Lesser Sunda Islands, Indonesia

- Town/City
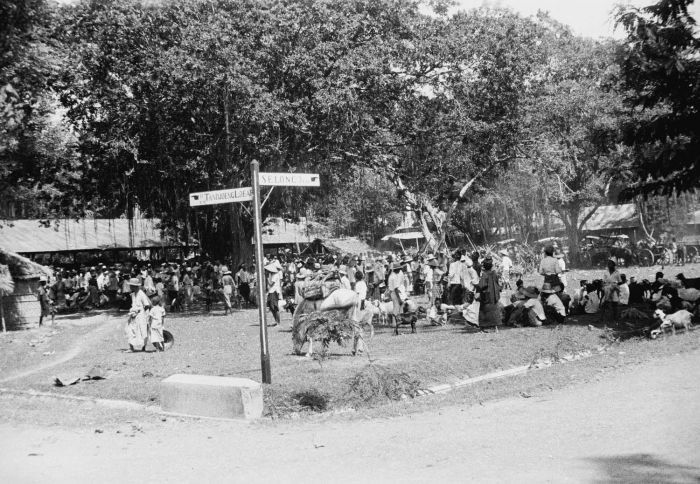
- Road sign at a market near Selong (1949)

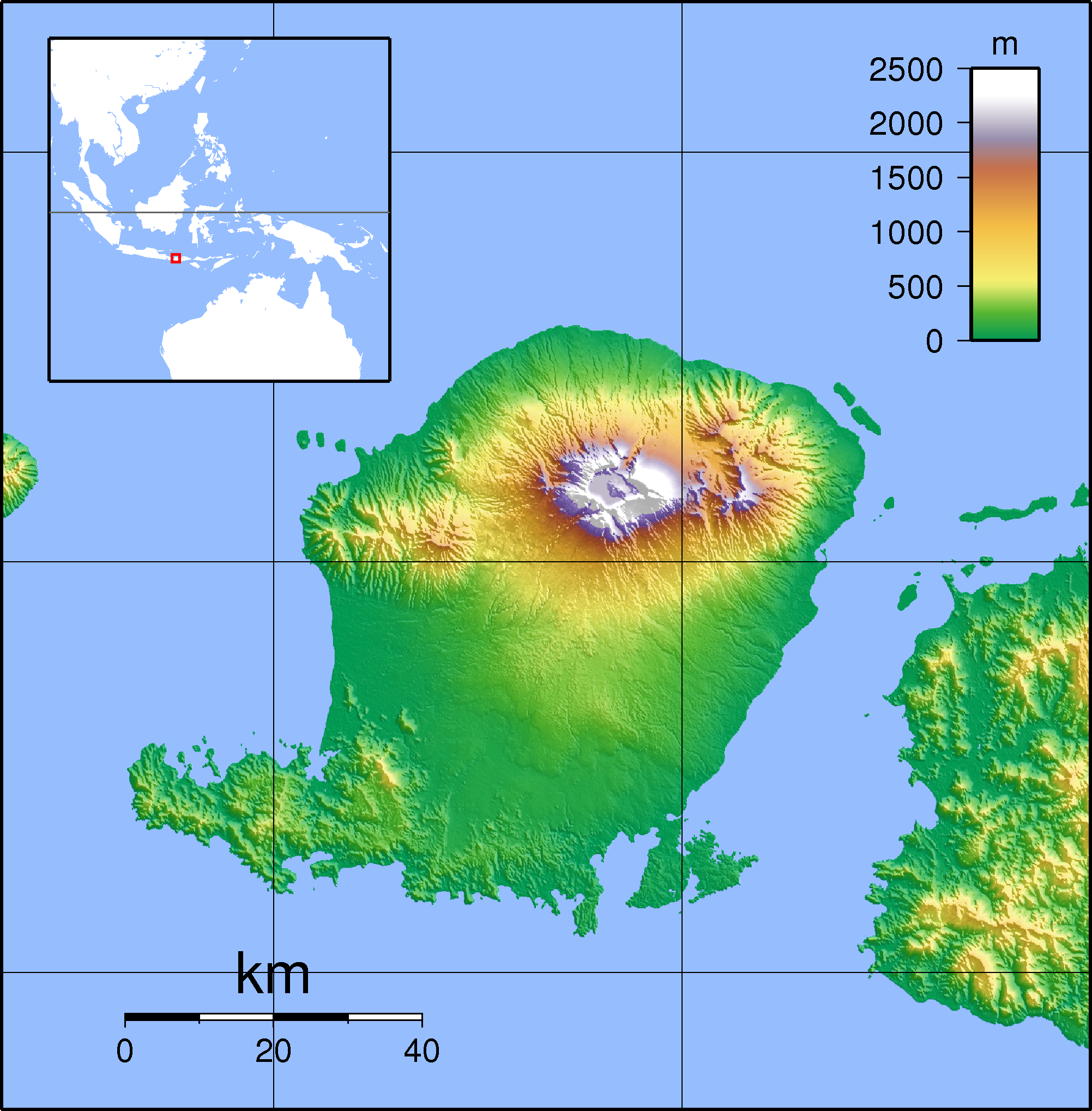
- Location in Indonesia Selong (Indonesia)
- Coordinates: 8°39′S 116°32′E
- Country: Indonesia
- Region: Lesser Sunda Islands
- Province: West Nusa Tenggara
- Regency: East Lombok

Area
  - Total: 31.68 km^{2} (12.23 sq mi)

Population (mid 2025 estimate)
  - Total: 98,910
  - Density: 3,122/km^{2} (8,086/sq mi)
- Time zone: UTC+08

Selong is a town and administrative district (kecamatan) on the island of Lombok which serves as the capital of the East Lombok Regency in the Indonesian province of West Nusa Tenggara. It is subdivided into the eleven urban villages (kelurahan) of Denggen, Jorong, Kelayu Selatan, Kelayu Utara, Kembang Sari, Majidi, Pancor, Rakam, Sandubaya, Sekarteja and Selong Kota, together with one rural village (desa) of Denggen Timur.

== Climate ==
Selong has a tropical savanna climate (Köppen Aw) with little to no rainfall from April to November and heavy rainfall from December to March.

Climate data for Selong
Month	Jan	Feb	Mar	Apr	May	Jun	Jul	Aug	Sep	Oct	Nov	Dec	Year
Mean daily maximum °C (°F)	29.6 (85.3)	29.6 (85.3)	29.9 (85.8)	30.4 (86.7)	30.0 (86.0)	29.3 (84.7)	28.9 (84.0)	29.4 (84.9)	30.1 (86.2)	30.4 (86.7)	30.1 (86.2)	29.8 (85.6)	29.8 (85.6)
Daily mean °C (°F)	25.6 (78.1)	25.7 (78.3)	25.7 (78.3)	25.6 (78.1)	25.0 (77.0)	24.1 (75.4)	23.6 (74.5)	24.0 (75.2)	24.9 (76.8)	25.5 (77.9)	25.8 (78.4)	25.7 (78.3)	25.1 (77.2)
Mean daily minimum °C (°F)	21.7 (71.1)	21.8 (71.2)	21.5 (70.7)	20.8 (69.4)	20.1 (68.2)	19.0 (66.2)	18.4 (65.1)	18.7 (65.7)	19.7 (67.5)	20.6 (69.1)	21.5 (70.7)	21.6 (70.9)	20.5 (68.8)
Average rainfall mm (inches)	254 (10.0)	166 (6.5)	146 (5.7)	52 (2.0)	36 (1.4)	8 (0.3)	38 (1.5)	15 (0.6)	5 (0.2)	29 (1.1)	84 (3.3)	215 (8.5)	1,048 (41.1)
Source: Climate-Data.org
