= Sutopo Purwo Nugroho =

Indonesian civil servant and academic (1969–2019)

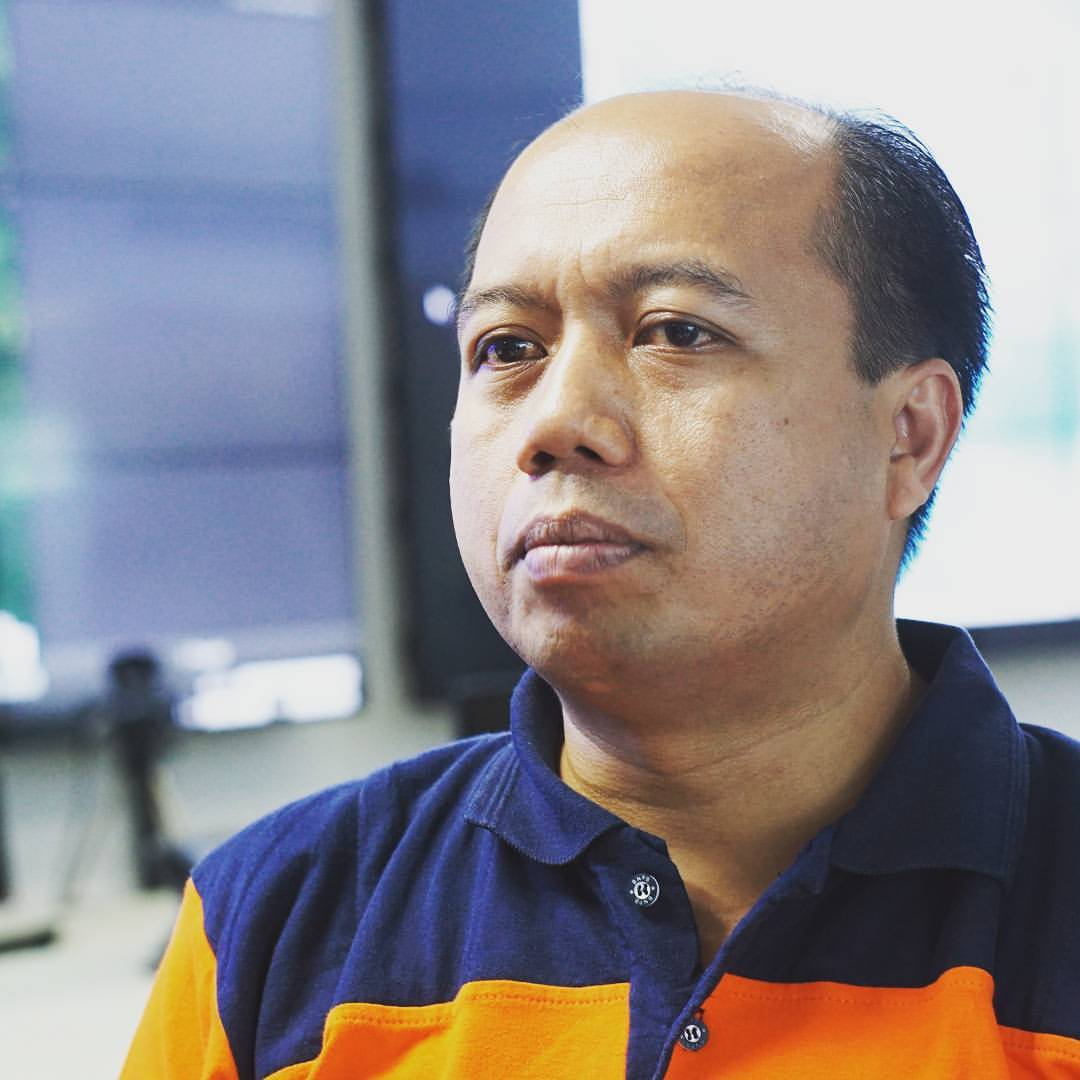
- Sutopo in 2017
- Born: 7 October 1969; Boyolali, Central Java, Indonesia
- Died: 7 July 2019 (aged 49); Guangzhou, Guangdong, China
- Occupations: Civil servant; academic
- Organization: Indonesian National Board for Disaster Management (BNPB)
- Title: Head of Data, Information and Public Relations Center at BNPB

Sutopo Purwo Nugroho (7 October 1969 – 7 July 2019) was an Indonesian civil servant and academic who worked at the Indonesian National Board for Disaster Management as its head of public relations.

An alumnus of Gadjah Mada University and Bogor Agricultural Institute, he started working for the government in 1994 before being placed at his public relations post in 2010.

== Early life and education ==
Sutopo was born in Boyolali, Central Java, on 7 October 1969 as the first son of Suharsono Harsosaputro and Sri Roosmandari. His father was a teacher. He attended elementary, middle and high schools in his hometown.

He earned his bachelor's degree in Geography from Gadjah Mada University in 1993, where he was the best graduate of the year. Later, he received his master's degree and PhD in hydrology, specialising in the carbon cycle and climate change, from Bogor Agricultural Institute. According to Sutopo in an interview with detik.com, he nearly became a research professor in 2012 before his appointment was cancelled by the Indonesian Institute of Sciences. This apparent setback led directly to his being hired as an Agency for Assessment and Application of Technology (BPPT) researcher working at the Indonesian National Board for Disaster Management (BNPB).

== Career ==
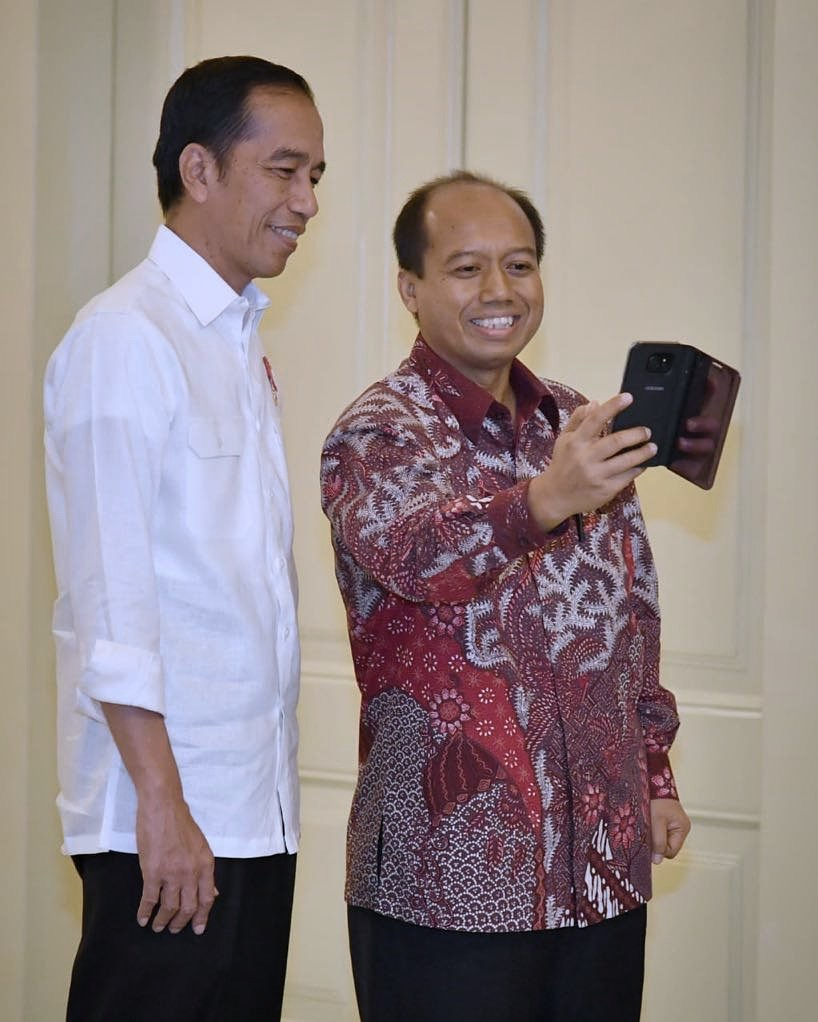
Sutopo meeting President Joko Widodo in 2018.

After graduating, he worked at the BPPT starting in 1994. There, he worked on cloud seeding. Eventually, he reached the rank of Main Senior Researcher (Indonesian: Peneliti Senior Utama), a rank with the highest pay grade (IV/e) in the Indonesian civil servant system. Sutopo was also involved in a research team which discovered issues with the Situ Gintung dam in late 2008, reporting their findings to the Ministry of Public Works, which found the dam still usable. The dam broke the following March, killing more than a hundred people.

Later, he assisted BNPB before fully joining it in August 2010. Initially, he was the director of risk mitigation. During his first few months in the position, notable disasters included floods in West Papua, an earthquake and tsunami in Mentawai and the eruptions of Mount Merapi. He became the Head of Data Center, Information and Public Relations in November the same year. According to Sutopo, he refused the position three times, before accepting when the agency chief pointed out his PhD, saying that people would believe him more because of it. In an interview with The New York Times, Sutopo remarked that he was not aware that he was being appointed as spokesman until he arrived at his swearing ceremony.

The Guardian referred to Sutopo as "something of a social media celebrity across the country". Due to his active presence on social media during disasters, The Straits Times called him "the single most-quoted Indonesian official in the news during any disaster". For his work in BNPB, he was awarded a "Public Campaigner Award" in 2014 by rmol.co. Later in 2018, Straits Times named him as one of the Asians of the Year, along with a group of other disaster management and relief figures collectively called "The First Responders".

In 2016, when the Governor of Jakarta, Basuki Tjahaja Purnama, criticized the province's disaster management agency, Sutopo defended him, saying that the governor's criticism should be taken as constructive input. The following year, after Basuki was arrested and imprisoned for religious blasphemy, Sutopo publicly praised the former governor on the latter's 51st birthday via Twitter for his success in reducing Jakarta's flooding. Following the 2018 Sunda Strait tsunami, Sutopo made a public remark that the tsunami early warning system in Indonesia was "still far from satisfactory".

ABC reported that in 2017, Sutopo was set to be rotated into another position in the agency, following its policy of staff rotation. The plan was reportedly cancelled after journalists desiring Sutopo to keep his post "bombarded [BNPB's] head with angry texts".

He also taught at Bogor Agricultural Institute, University of Indonesia, and Indonesia Defence University.

== Personal life ==
Sutopo was married to Retno Utami Yulianingsih, and the couple had four children.

== Illness and death ==
In 2018, Sutopo announced that he had stage IV lung cancer and was undergoing therapy. Despite needing to refrain from physically intensive activities, he continued to work and maintained his social media presence, providing information on events including the sinking of MV Sinar Bangun and the Lombok earthquakes. In June 2019, he went to Guangzhou for treatment. He died there on the morning of 7 July.

His body was flown back and buried in his hometown of Boyolali the following day.
