= Sikur =

- District
- Interactive map of Sikur
- Country: Indonesia
- Province: West Nusa Tenggara
- Regency: East Lombok

Area
  - Total: 78.27 km^{2} (30.22 sq mi)

Population (mid 2025 estimate)
  - Total: 86,079
  - Density: 1,100/km^{2} (2,848/sq mi)
- Time zone: UTC+07.00 (WIB)

Sikur is an administrative district (kecamatan) in East Lombok Regency, within West Nusa Tenggara Province of Indonesia.
