= Sakka (surname) =

Sakka is an Arabic surname. Notable people with the surname include:

- Ahmed El Sakka (born 1973), Egyptian actor
- Louai Sakka (born 1972), Syrian terrorist
