= 19 August 2018 Lombok earthquake =

Earthquake in Indonesia

19 August 2018 Lombok
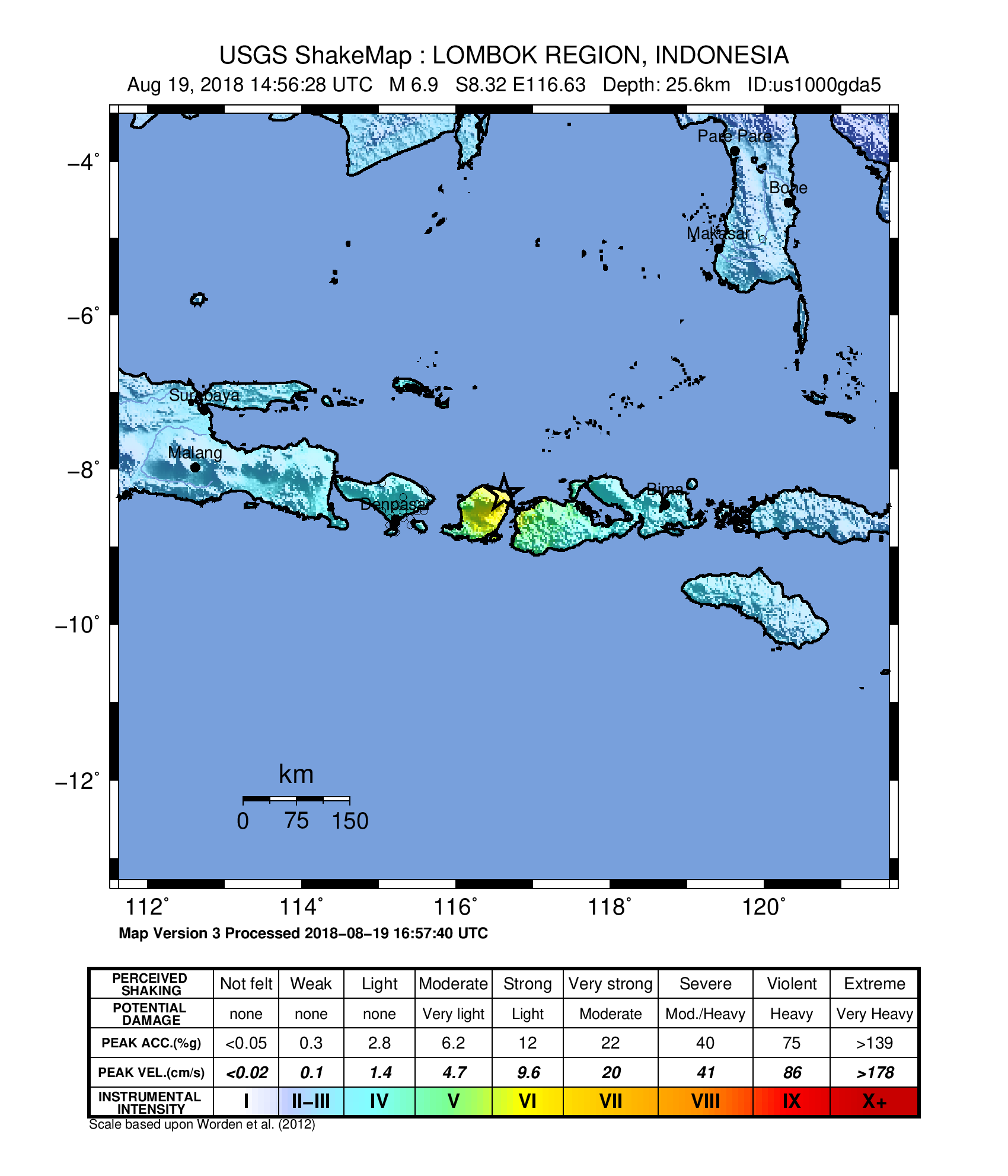
- Shakemap for the 19 August 2018 Lombok earthquake

- Location within Indonesia
- UTC time: 2018-08-19 14:56:28
- ISC event
- USGS-ANSS: ComCat
- Local date: 19 August 2018
- Local time: 22:56
- Magnitude: 6.9 M_{w}
- Depth: 21.0 km (13.0 mi)
- Epicenter: 8.324°S 116.626°E
- Fault: Flores Back Arc Thrust Belt
- Type: Thrust
- Max. intensity: MMI VII (Very strong)
- Casualties: 14 dead, 24 injured

Map of 2018 Lombok earthquakes

On 19 August 2018 a major earthquake struck with high intensity on the northeast corner of Lombok (Sambelia and Labuhan Lombok settlements) and northwest Sumbawa (Poto Tano settlement) at 22:56 local time, a few km to the east of a series of quakes that had been rocking the area for the past 3 weeks. It was measured at M_{w} 6.9 (USGS), at a depth of 21.0 km. The Indonesian BMKG announced that it was a new major earthquake and not an aftershock. The earthquake occurred on the same overall structure, the Flores back-arc thrust fault. However, according to scientists, it happened on a different thrust fault as there are many individual structures within the belt. There were 14 deaths and 1800 homes were damaged, around half of them severely, due to this event, including deaths on Sumbawa, following 2 deaths from the previous Lombok quake roughly 24 hours earlier. Heavy tiles fell from the local mosque, and 143 patients were treated outdoors in makeshift tents for injuries on Sumbawa.

== See also ==
- 5 August 2018 Lombok earthquake
- July 2018 Lombok earthquake
