= Sakrah =

Sakrah سكرة Sakra
- Village
- Location in Syria
- Coordinates: 34°42′24″N 36°51′11″E
- Country: Syria
- Governorate: Homs
- District: Homs
- Subdistrict: Homs

Population (2004)
  - Total: 2,155
- Time zone: UTC+2 (EET)
  - Summer (DST): UTC+3 (EEST)

Sakrah (Arabic: سكرة, also spelled Sakra) is a village in the Homs Governorate in central Syria, just east of Homs and on the western fringes of the Syrian Desert. According to the Central Bureau of Statistics (CBS), Sakrah had a population of 2,155 in 2004.

In September 2014, a meeting dedicated to Syrian reconciliation was held in Sakrah. Hosted by Homs Governor Talal al-Barazi, the meeting included Secretary-General of the People's Party, Nawaf al-Melhim, village representative Ahmad Awdeh and Pastor Zahri Khaza'al of the Saint Mary Church of the Holy Belt. The delegates called for the restoration of peace and tolerance in Homs and asserted their support for national unity amid the Syrian civil war.
