= East Lombok Regency =

Regency in West Nusa Tenggara, Indonesia

East Lombok Regency Kabupaten Lombok Timur
- Regency
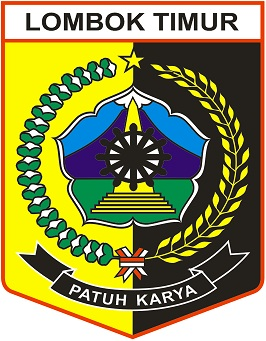
- Coat of arms
- Motto(s): Patuh Karya (Obedient and Productive)
- Location within West Nusa Tenggara

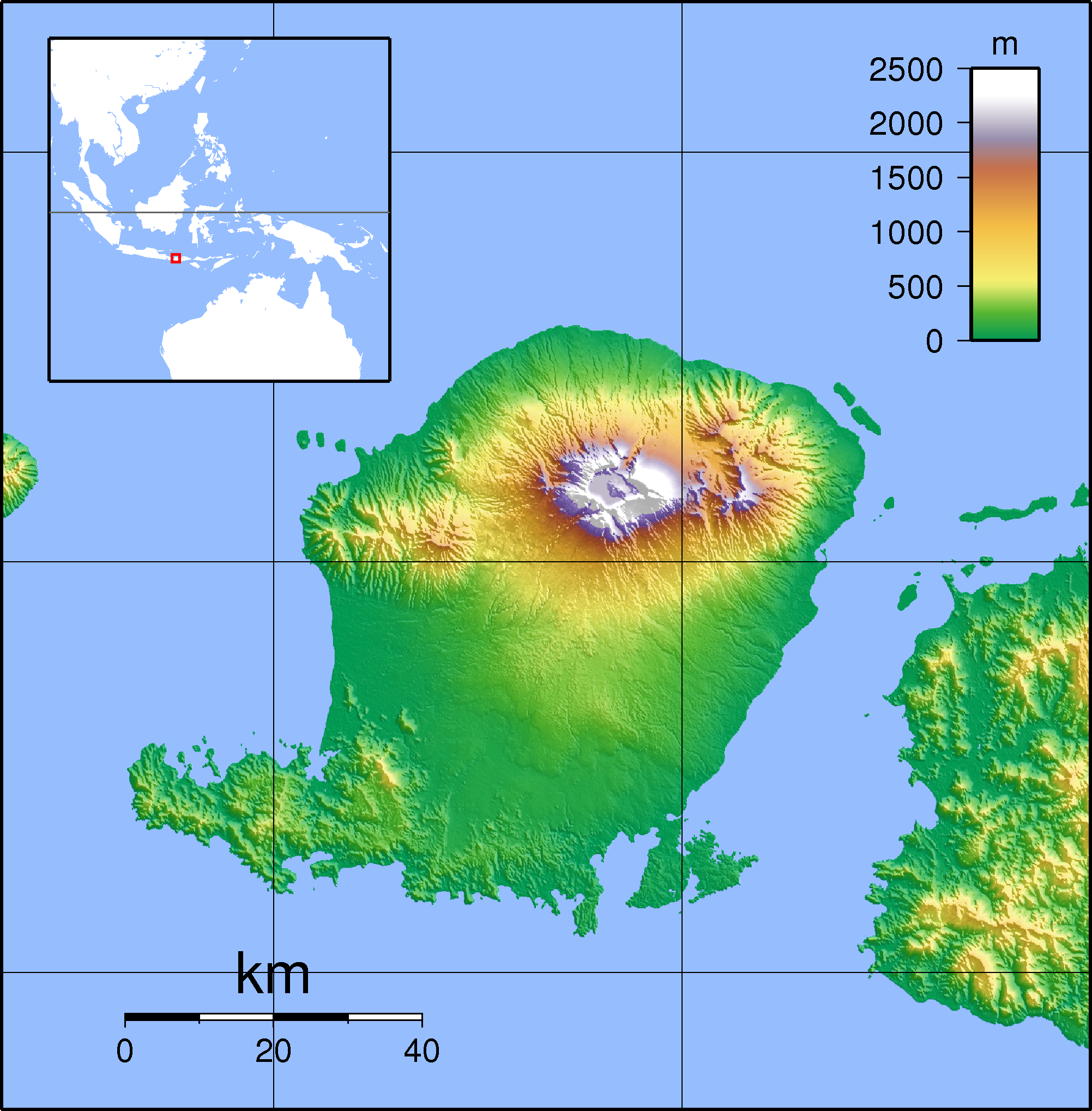
- Location in Lombok, Lesser Sunda Islands and Indonesia East Lombok Regency (Lesser Sunda Islands) East Lombok Regency (Indonesia)
- Coordinates: 8°39′S 116°32′E
- Country: Indonesia
- Province: West Nusa Tenggara
- Capital: Selong

Government
  - Regent: Haerul Warisin
  - Vice Regent: Edwin Hadiwijaya

Area
  - Total: 1,605.55 km^{2} (619.91 sq mi)

Population (mid 2025 estimate)
  - Total: 1,449,920
  - Density: 903.067/km^{2} (2,338.93/sq mi)

Demographics
  - Ethnic groups: Sasak, Balinese, Tionghoa-peranakan, Sumbawa people, Flores people, Arab Indonesian
  - Religion: Muslim, Hindu, Christian, Buddhist
  - Languages: Indonesian (official), Sasak
- Time zone: UTC+8 (ICST)
- Area code: (+62) 376
- Website: lomboktimurkab.go.id

East Lombok Regency is a regency (Indonesian: Kabupaten) of the Indonesian Province of West Nusa Tenggara. It is located on the island of Lombok, of which it comprises the eastern third (including minor offshore islands); the administrative capital is the inland town of Selong, situated halfway between Masbagik town and the port of Labuhan Haji. However, the main economic centres are the ports of Labuhan Haji (in the south-central part of the east coast) and Labuhan Lombok (in the northern part of the east coast), from which there are ferries to Labuhan Tanu on Sumbawa and Padangbai on Bali. The Regency covers an area of 1,605.55 km^{2} and had a population of 1,105,582 at the 2010 Census and 1,325,240 at the 2020 Census; the official estimate as at mid 2025 was 1,449,920 (comprising 718,545 males and 731,375 females).

== Location ==
To the north lies the Java Sea. To the west are North Lombok Regency and Central Lombok Regency. To the south is the Lombok Basin and the Indian Ocean and to the east lies Elas Strait, a narrow body of water separating Lombok and the nearby small Gili Belang from Sumbawa which lies approximately 15 km to the east. The north of the Regency is on the eastern flank of Mount Rinjani, which at 3,726 m is the third highest mountain and the second largest volcano in the country. The mountain is an active volcano. The oldest recorded historical eruption was in 1847, and the last eruption was in May 2010.

== Administration ==
The area of East Lombok Regency is 2,679.88 km^{2}, consisting of a land area of 1,605.55 km ² (59.91%) and a water (seabed) area of 1,074.33 km^{2} (40.09%).

=== Administrative structure ===
Kabupaten Lombok Timur (East Lombok Regency) is one of Lombok's four Regencies or administrative regions.

- TGH M Zainul Majdi, MA., Governor of NTB (West Nusa Tenggara), (Mataram is the Provincial Capital of West Nusa Tenggara)
- Drs. HM Sukiman AZMY, MM, Regent (Bupati) of Kabupaten Lombok Timur (East Lombok Regency).

=== Administrative boundaries ===
Boundary	District	Regency
North		Java Sea
South	Lombok Basin	Indian Ocean
West	Praya; Mount Rinjani	Central Lombok Regency; North Lombok Regency
East	Alas Strait	Sumbawa

== Administrative districts ==
At the 2010 Census, the East Lombok Regency consisted of twenty districts (kecamatan), but an additional district (Lenek) was added in 2018 by splitting off 10 villages in the western part of Aikmel District. The districts are tabulated below roughly from south to north, with their areas and their populations at the 2010 Census and the 2020 Census, together with the official estimates as at mid 2025. The table also includes the locations of the district administrative centres, the number of administrative villages in each district (totaling 239 rural desa and 15 urban kelurahan), and its postal codes.

Kode Wilayah	Name of District (kecamatan)	Area in km^{2}	Pop'n Census 2010	Pop'n Census 2020	Pop'n Estimate mid 2025	Admin centre	No. of villages	Post codes
52.03.01	Keruak ^{(a)}	40.49	47,901	57,705	63,109	Keruak	15	83673
52.03.20	Jerowaru ^{(b)}	142.78	53,181	61,411	69,310	Jerowaru	15	83672
52.03.02	Sakra	25.09	52,731	64,080	69,604	Sakra	12	83671
52.03.19	Sakra Barat (West Sakra)	32.30	46,840	58,184	63,275	Rensing	18	83670
52.03.18	Sakra Timur (East Sakra)	37.04	40,909	52,012	57,093	Lepak	10	83674
Sub-totals for	South sector	277.70	241,562	293,392	322,391		70	
52.03.03	Terara	41.41	65,485	75,889	83,045	Terara	16	83664
52.03.11	Montong Gading	25.66	40,603	48,801	52,092	Montong Betok	8	83663
52.03.04	Sikur	78.27	67,550	79,023	86,079	Sikur	14	83662
52.03.05	Masbagik	33.17	93,993	107,893	117,446	Masbagik	10	83661
52.03.12	Pringgasela	134.26	50,059	63,110	69,941	Pringgasela	10	83660
52.03.06	Sukamulia	14.49	30,373	36,373	39,676	Sukamulia	9	83652
52.03.13	Suralaga	27.02	51,940	64,681	69,721	Suralaga	15	83651
52.03.07	Selong	31.68	82,627	92,464	98,910	Selong	12 ^{(c)}	83611 - 83613, 83617 - 63619
52.03.17	Labuhan Haji	49.57	53,023	64,492	69,132	Labuhan Haji	12 ^{(d)}	83615 - 83617
Sub-totals for	Central sector	435.53	535,654	632,726	686,052		106	
52.03.08	Pringgabaya ^{(e)}	136.20	90,548	110,813	120,171	Pringgabaya	15	83654
52.03.16	Suela	115.01	37,441	45,421	49,820	Suela	8	83655
52.03.09	Aikmel	75.05	92,853	70,121	76,585	Aikmel	14	83653
52.03.14	Wanasaba	55.89	59,317	68,302	77,317	Wanasaba	14	83650
52.03.15	Sembalun	217.08	18,786	23,568	26,159	Sembalun	6	83657
52.03.21	Lenek	47.87	^{(f)}	43,520	49,539	Lenek	10	83657
52.03.10	Sambelia ^{(g)}	245.22	29,422	37,377	41,886	Sambelia	11	83656
Sub-totals for	North sector	892.32	328,366	399,122	441,477		78	
Totals for	Regency	1,605.55	1,105,582	1,325,240	1,449,920	Selong	254	

Notes: (a) including 4 small islands off the east coast of Lombok Island. (b) includes the entire southeast peninsula and 24 islands off the southeast corner of Lombok Island.
(c) comprises the 11 kelurahan of Denggen, Jorong, Kelayu Selatan, Kelayu Utara, Kembang Sari, Majidi, Pancor, Rakam, Sandubaya, Sekarteja and Selong Kota, plus one desa (Denggen Timur).
(d) comprises 4 kelurahan (Geres, Ijobalit, Suryawangi and Tanjung) and 8 desa. Labuhan Haji desa had 10,385 inhabitants in 2024.
(e) includes the port town of Labuhan Lombok. In 2024 Labuhan Lombok desa had 15,144 inhabitants and Pringgabaya desa had 17,768 inhabitants.
(f) the 2010 Census population of the new Lenek District is included in the figures for Aikmel District, from which it was subsequently split off in 2018.
(g) includes 7 islands off the northeast corner of Lombok Island, of which the largest are Gili Sulat and Gili Lawang.

The districts are subdivided into 239 rural Desa and 15 urban Kelurahan; of the latter 11 are in Selong District and 4 are in Labuhan Haji District.

== Population ==
The majority of the population are Sasak people, who speak the Sasak language.

In the 2010 Census, East Lombok Regency recorded 1,105,582 inhabitants, 24.7% being officially below the Indonesian poverty level; the 2020 Census showed the population having risen to 1,325,240, and the official estimate as at mid 2025 was 1,449,920 (comprising 718,545 males and 731,375 females). The population of this regency are predominantly Muslim.

== Ethnicity ==
The Sasak people are the indigenous people of Lombok and form the vast majority of East Lombok's residents, with few people of Balinese origin compared with West Lombok. East Lombok is also home to people of Chinese, Tionghoa-peranakan people of mixed Indonesian and Chinese descent and small number of Arab Indonesian people, mainly of Yemeni descent who originally settled in the early port city of Ampenan.

== Religion ==
Islam is the religion of the majority of the population of East Lombok. Other religions practised in East Lombok are Christianity, Catholicism, Hinduism, Buddhism, and Confucianism.

== Language ==
Most people in east Lombok normally speak the Sasak language. Sasak is the native language of the indigenous people of Lombok. Indonesian is the language most widely used in everyday interactions at places such as hotels, larger shops in the township of Praya and in government offices. When at home or a place of recreation east Lombok residents tend to use local eastern Lombok dialects of the Sasak language.

== Land use ==
Rivers and catchment areas:' Lombok Island has four main watersheds. Menanga watershed, which is administratively in the territory of East Lombok, has been declared by the Governor of Nusa Teggara Barat to be a critical watershed by Decree No. 122 in 2005. Lombok is faced with a serious water supply and management problem, caused by increasing forest and water table damage, land degradation and poor forestry management. West Nusa Tenggara province as a whole is threatened with a water crisis caused by increasing forest and water table damage and degradation.

== Services and development ==
The region is essentially agrarian in activity with rice, copra, casava, tobacco, timber and other crops. Rainfall is lower in the south of the Regency and higher in the north as the land rises toward Mount Rinjani. Rinjani supplies a rainfall catchment area to the region and several into eastern Lombok rivers flow from its slopes. The sea supports a small local fishing industry, seaweed harvesting, a pearl industry and prawn farming.

The growing tourism industry in Lombok has had little effect on the eastern coast. The proximity of the new Lombok International Airport will possible lead to an increase in tourism related business and development in east Lombok in coming years.

== Transport ==
Public ferries' provide services for both passengers and vehicles. Labuhan Lombok is in East Lombok Regency (Pringgabaya District) and provides connections eastward to Labuhan Tano in West Sumbawa and westward to Padangbai in Bali, although Tanjung Lembar in the south west of the island is Lombok's main port and handles small freighters, fishing boats and the combination vehicle and passenger ferries heading westward to Bali.

- Alat Strait: Labuhan Lombok - Labuhan Tano, Sumbawa with 8 ferries providing 18 crossings per day.
- Lombok Strait: Lembar Lombok - Padangbai, Bali, with 12 ferries providing crossings once every hour.

These ferries connecting to nearby Sumbawa and Bali provide the principal facilities for road transport movements in and out of Lombok. Disruptions on these routes can significantly affect trade and the provision of supplies to the island as the shipping operators on these routes will often suspend services due to breakdown or heavy seas.

East Lombok is served by the Lombok International Airport (Bandara Internasional Lombok) (IATA: LOP, ICAO: WADL). The new airport provides domestic terminal facilities serving destinations in Java, Bali and Sumbawa. The main terminal building also provides international terminal facilities, currently limited to international connections to Malaysia provided by AirAsia. International flights to Kuala Lumpur provided by Garuda and Merpati airlines depart from the Domestic terminal.

The new international airport will provide facilities for wide bodied aircraft with more modern terminal facilities and improved cargo facilities.

Lombok International Airport in Central Lombok is south west of Praya in south central Lombok. The airport commenced operations on 1 October 2011 replacing the previous international and domestic facilities at Selaparang Airport near Ampenan in West Lombok Regency which formally closed for operations on the evening of 30 September 2011. All services previously operated at the Selaparang airport were moved across to the new airport at that time.
