= National Agency for Disaster Countermeasure =

Indonesian government agency

- Badan Nasional Penanggulangan Bencana
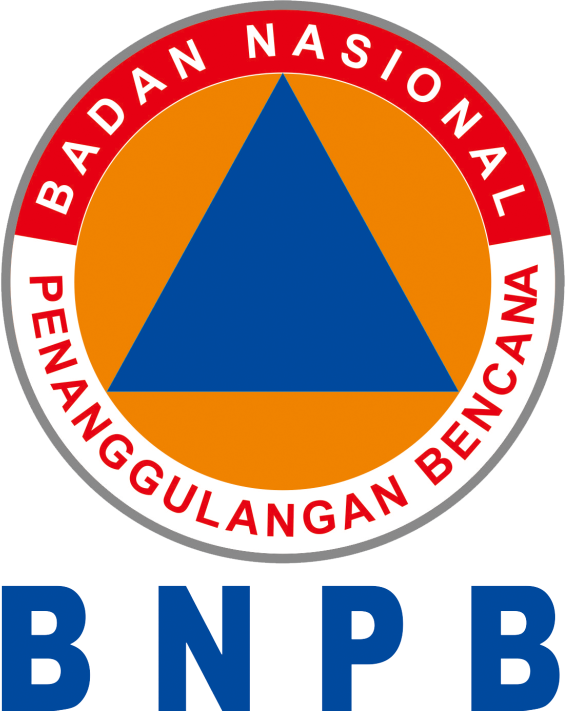
- Seal of the National Agency for Disaster Countermeasure

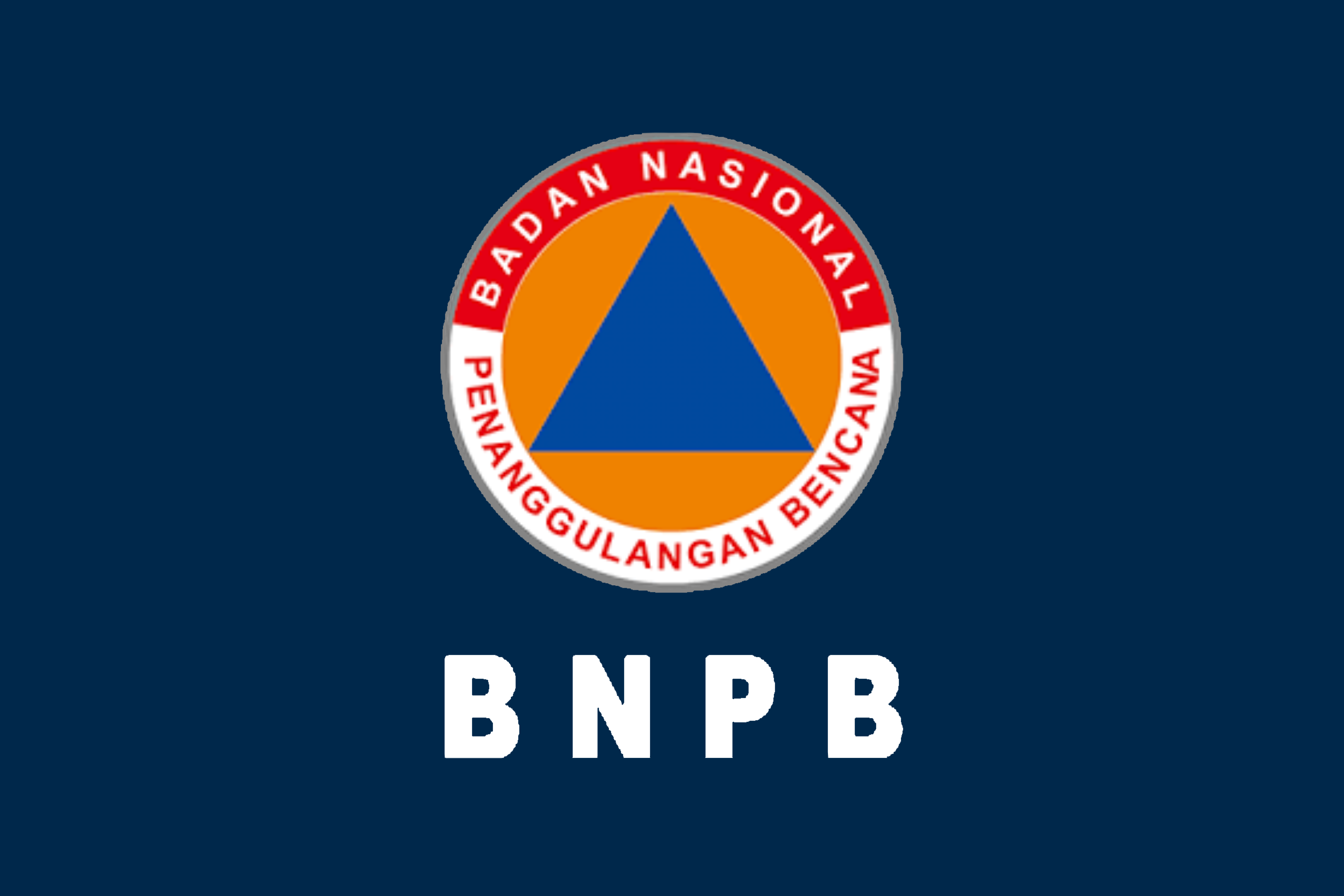
- Flag of the National Agency for Disaster Countermeasure

Agency overview
- Formed: 26 January 2008
- Preceding agency: National Coordinating Board for Disaster Management
- Jurisdiction: Indonesia
- Annual budget: Rp 1.47 trillion (2016)
- Agency executive: Lt Gen Kristomei Sianturi, Head of BNPB
- Website: www.bnpb.go.id

The National Agency for Disaster Countermeasure (Indonesian: Badan Nasional Penanggulangan Bencana, lit. 'Disaster Countermeasure National Agency'), abbreviated as BNPB, is the Indonesian board for natural disaster affairs. It was established in 2008 to replace the National Coordinating Board for Disaster Management (Badan Koordinasi Nasional Penanggulangan Bencana or Bakornas PB). BNPB is directly responsible to the President of Indonesia and the chairman is directly appointed by the President.

== History ==
On 20 August 1945, the Indonesian government established the Agency for Assisting Families of War Victims (Badan Penolong Keluarga Korban Perang; abbreviated as BPKKP) and its focus was to assist the war victims and their respective families during the Indonesian National Revolution.

In 1966, the government established the advisory board of Central Natural Disaster Management (Badan Pertimbangan Penanggulangan Bencana Alam Pusat; abbreviated as BP2BAP) through the Presidential Decree Number 256 of 1966. The board was responsible to the Minister of Social Affairs. A year later, the Cabinet Presidium through Decree number 14/U/KEP/I/1967, established the National Coordination Team for Disaster Management (Tim Koordinasi Nasional Penanggulangan Bencana Alam; abbreviated as TKP2BA).

Bakornas PB was established in 1979 to replace the Advisory Board for Natural Disasters, which was established in 1966. The organization in form of the current BNPB was established in 2008, in accordance to Presidential Decree 8 of 2008.

On 21 January 2019, President Joko Widodo elevated the rank of the BNPB head to a minister-level official, allowing the agency to directly take over commanding functions during natural disasters.

== Duties and functions ==
=== Duties ===
- Provide guidance and direction for disaster management efforts, including disaster prevention, emergency handling, rehabilitation, and reconstruction fairly and equitably
- Establish standards and requirements for the organization of disaster management based on legislative regulations
- Communicate disaster management activities to the public
- Report on disaster management activities to the President once a month during normal conditions and at any time during disaster emergencies
- Utilize and account for national and international donations/assistance
- Be accountable for the use of the budget received from the State Budget
- Fulfill other obligations in accordance with legislative regulations
- Develop guidelines for the establishment of Regional Disaster Management Agencies

=== Functions ===
Formulation and establishment of disaster management policies and handling of refugees to act quickly and appropriately and effectively and efficiently; and Coordinating implementation of disaster management activities in a planned, integrated, and comprehensive.

Amongst other things, the Board issues regular information about the status of alerts for selected Indonesian volcanoes. In issuing these information bulletins, the Board draws on the advice of the Centre of Vulcanology and Geological Hazard Mitigation (often known as PVMBG from the Indonesian name for the centre, Pusat Vulkanology dan Mitigasi Bencana Geologi). These bulletins are intended to warn local residents of likely threats and also help in planning for emergency response activities. The alerts are also useful for visitors who may be planning trips to these sites. As of September 2011, five volcanoes were included on the Level III "Alert" (Indonesian: Siaga) list and 12 were on the Level II "Vigilant" (Indonesian: Waspada) list

The Board has noted that financial support for disaster responses in Indonesia remains relatively limited. A spokesperson for the board observed that a sum of only Rp 4 trillion (around $US 470 million) had been allocated to support disaster relief in Indonesia during 2011.

== See also ==
- National Search and Rescue Agency
- Meteorology, Climatology, and Geophysical Agency
- List of natural disasters in Indonesia
