= List of districts of West Nusa Tenggara =

The province of West Nusa Tenggara in Indonesia is divided into regencies (Indonesian: kabupaten) which are turn are divided administratively into districts (kecamatan).

The districts of West Nusa Tenggara, with the regency each falls into, are as follows:

District (Kecamatan)	Regency (Kabupaten)
Aikmel, Lombok Timur	Lombok Timur (East Lombok)
Alas Barat, Sumbawa	Sumbawa
Alas, Sumbawa	Sumbawa
Ambalawi, Bima	Bima
Ampenan, Mataram	Mataram
Asakota, Bima	Bima
Batu Lanteh, Sumbawa	Sumbawa
Batu Layar, Lombok Barat	Lombok Barat (West Lombok)
Batukliang Utara, Lombok Tengah	Lombok Tengah (Central Lombok)
Batukliang, Lombok Tengah	Lombok Tengah (Central Lombok)
Bayan, Lombok Barat	Lombok Barat (West Lombok)
Belo, Bima	Bima
Bolo, Bima	Bima
Brang Ene, Sumbawa Barat	Sumbawa Barat (West Sumbawa)
Brang Rea, Sumbawa Barat	Sumbawa Barat (West Sumbawa)
Cakranegara, Mataram	Mataram
Dompu, Dompu	Dompu
Donggo, Bima	Bima
Empang, Sumbawa	Sumbawa
Gangga, Lombok Barat	Lombok Barat (West Lombok)
Gerung, Lombok Barat	Lombok Barat (West Lombok)
Gunung Sari, Lombok Barat	Lombok Barat (West Lombok)
Hu'u, Dompu	Dompu
Janapria, Lombok Tengah	Lombok Tengah (Central Lombok)
Jereweh, Sumbawa Barat	Sumbawa Barat (West Sumbawa)
Jerowaru, Lombok Timur	Lombok Timur (East Lombok)
Jonggat, Lombok Tengah	Lombok Tengah (Central Lombok)
Kayangan, Lombok Barat	Lombok Barat (West Lombok)
Kediri, Lombok Barat	Lombok Barat (West Lombok)
Keruak, Lombok Timur	Lombok Timur (East Lombok)
Kilo, Dompu	Dompu
Kopang, Lombok Tengah	Lombok Tengah (Central Lombok)
Kuripan, Lombok Barat	Lombok Barat (West Lombok)
Labangka, Sumbawa	Sumbawa
Labu Api, Lombok Barat	Lombok Barat (West Lombok)
Labuhan Badas, Sumbawa	Sumbawa
Labuhan Haji, Lombok Timur	Lombok Timur (East Lombok)
Lambu, Bima	Bima
Langgudu, Bima	Bima
Lape-Lopok, Sumbawa	Sumbawa
Lembar, Lombok Barat	Lombok Barat (West Lombok)
Lingsar, Lombok Barat	Lombok Barat (West Lombok)
Lunyuk, Sumbawa	Sumbawa
Mada Pangga, Bima	Bima
Maluk, Sumbawa Barat	Sumbawa Barat (West Sumbawa)
Manggelewa, Dompu	Dompu
Masbagik, Lombok Timur	Lombok Timur (East Lombok)
Mataram, Mataram	Mataram
Monta, Bima	Bima
Montong Gading, Lombok Timur	Lombok Timur (East Lombok)
Moyohilir, Sumbawa	Sumbawa
Moyohulu, Sumbawa	Sumbawa
Narmada, Lombok Barat	Lombok Barat (West Lombok)
Pajo, Dompu	Dompu
Palibelo, Bima	Bima
Parado, Bima	Bima
Parewa, Bima	Bima
Pekat, Dompu	Dompu
Pemenang, Lombok Barat	Lombok Barat (West Lombok)
Plampang, Sumbawa	Sumbawa
Poto Tano, Sumbawa Barat	Sumbawa Barat (West Sumbawa)
Praya Barat Daya, Lombok Tengah	Lombok Tengah (Central Lombok)
Praya Barat, Lombok Tengah	Lombok Tengah (Central Lombok)
Praya Tengah, Lombok Tengah	Lombok Tengah (Central Lombok)
Praya Timur, Lombok Tengah	Lombok Tengah (Central Lombok)
Praya, Lombok Tengah	Lombok Tengah (Central Lombok)
Pringgabaya, Lombok Timur	Lombok Timur (East Lombok)
Pringgarata, Lombok Tengah	Lombok Tengah (Central Lombok)
Pringgasela, Lombok Timur	Lombok Timur (East Lombok)
Pujut, Lombok Tengah	Lombok Tengah (Central Lombok)
Rasanae Barat, Bima	Bima
Rasanae Timur, Bima	Bima
Rhee, Sumbawa	Sumbawa
Ropang, Sumbawa	Sumbawa
Sakra Barat, Lombok Timur	Lombok Timur (East Lombok)
Sakra Timur, Lombok Timur	Lombok Timur (East Lombok)
Sakra, Lombok Timur	Lombok Timur (East Lombok)
Sambelia, Lombok Timur	Lombok Timur (East Lombok)
Sanggar, Bima	Bima
Sape, Bima	Bima
Sekongkang, Sumbawa Barat	Sumbawa Barat (West Sumbawa)
Sekotong Tengah, Lombok Barat	Lombok Barat (West Lombok)
Selong, Lombok Timur	Lombok Timur (East Lombok)
Sembalun, Lombok Timur	Lombok Timur (East Lombok)
Seteluk, Sumbawa Barat	Sumbawa Barat (West Sumbawa)
Sikur, Lombok Timur	Lombok Timur (East Lombok)
Soromandi, Bima	Bima
Suela, Lombok Timur	Lombok Timur (East Lombok)
Sukamulia, Lombok Timur	Lombok Timur (East Lombok)
Sumbawa, Sumbawa	Sumbawa
Suralaga, Lombok Timur	Lombok Timur (East Lombok)
Taliwang, Sumbawa Barat	Sumbawa Barat (West Sumbawa)
Tambora, Bima	Bima
Tanjung, Lombok	Lombok Utara (North Lombok)
Terara, Lombok Timur	Lombok Timur (East Lombok)
Utan, Sumbawa	Sumbawa
Wanasaba, Lombok Timur	Lombok Timur (East Lombok)
Wawo, Bima	Bima
Wera, Bima	Bima
Woha, Bima	Bima
Woja, Dompu	Dompu
