= Dompu Regency =

Regency in West Nusa Tenggara, Indonesia

Dompu Regency Kabupaten Dompu
- Regency
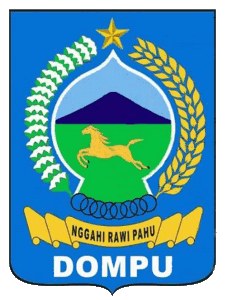
- Coat of arms
- Motto(s): Nggahi Rawi Pahu (Consistent between words and deeds)
- Location within West Nusa Tenggara

- Location in Lesser Sunda Islands and Indonesia Dompu Regency (Indonesia)
- Coordinates: 8°32′S 118°28′E
- Country: Indonesia
- Province: West Nusa Tenggara
- Capital: Dompu

Government
  - Regent: Bambang Firdaus
  - Vice Regent: Syirajuddin

Area
  - Total: 2,292.52 km^{2} (885.15 sq mi)

Population (mid 2025 estimate)
  - Total: 254,667
  - Density: 111.086/km^{2} (287.712/sq mi)
- Time zone: UTC+8 (ICST)
- Area code: (+62) 373
- Website: dompukab.go.id

Dompu Regency (Indonesian: Kabupaten Dompu; Indonesian pronunciation: [kabuˌpat̪ɛn ˈdompu]) is a regency of the Indonesian Province of West Nusa Tenggara. It is located on the island of Sumbawa and the capital is Dompu. It is bordered to the north and to the east by two non-contiguous parts of Bima Regency, and to the west by Sumbawa Regency, as well as on its coasts by Saleh Bay, Sanggar Bay, and Cempi Bay. It covers a land area of 2,292.52 km^{2}, and the population at the 2010 Census was 218,984 and at the 2020 Census was 236,665; the official estimate as at mid 2025 was 254,667 (comprising 128,017 males and 126,650 females).

== Demography ==
Of the total population of 254,667 in mid 2025, 69,383 (27.24%) were below the age of 15, and 185,284 were aged 15 and above; of the latter, 169,414 (66.52%) were of working age and 15,870 (6.23%) were aged 65 and above.

== Administrative districts ==
Dompu Regency consists of eight districts (kecamatan), tabulated below with their areas and their populations at the 2010 Census and the 2020 Census, together with the official estimates as at mid 2025. The table also includes the locations of the district administrative centres, the number of administrative villages (totaling 72 rural villages (desa) and 9 urban villages (kelurahan)) and the number of offshore islands in each district, and its postal codes.

Kode Wilayah	Name of District (kecamatan)	Area in km^{2}	Pop'n 2010 Census	Pop'n 2020 Census	Pop'n mid 2025 Estimate	Admin centre	No. of villages	No. of islands	Post code
52.05.03	Hu'u	227.30	16,050	17,864	19,250	Rasabou	8	-	84271
52.05.08	Pajo	119.95	12,545	13,689	14,751	Ranggo	6	1	84272
52.05.01	Dompu (district)	173.56	49,854	54,987	59,250	Bada	15 ^{(a)}	-	84211 -84219
52.05.05	Woja	304.09	51,704	57,019	61,441	Montabaru	14 ^{(b)}	1	84251^{(c)}
52.05.04	Kilo	209.67	11,971	13,003	14,011	Malaju	6	-	84252
52.05.02	Kempo	192.88	18,185	18,962	20,432	Kempo	8	3	84261
52.05.07	Manggelewa	272.86	27,777	30,231	32,575	Soriutu	12	17	84253
52.05.06	Pekat ^{(d)}	792.22	30,887	30,910	32,957	Pekat	12	1	84260
	Totals	2,292.52	218,973	236,665	254,667	Dompu	81	23	

Notes: (a) comprises 6 kelurahan (Bada, Bali, Karijawa, Potu, Dora Tangga and Kandai I) and 9 desa. (b) includes 3 kelurahan (Simpasai, Kandai II and Montabaru), which are part of the Dompu town urban area.
(c) except the 3 kelurahan of Simpasai (with a post code of 84216), Kandai II (with a post code of 84218) and Montabaru (with a post code of 84219).
(d) comprises the southern half of the Sanggar Peninsula, plus the small volcanic island of Satonda off the north coast of that peninsula.
