= Woko =

Woko may refer to:

- WOKO, country music radio station in Burlington, Vermont, U.S.
- Woko language, language of Cameroon
- Woko National Park, park in New South Wales, Australia
- Woko, New South Wales, locality in the MidCoast Council, New South Wales, Australia
- Woko, Indonesia, village in Pajo district, Dompu regency, West Nusa Tenggara, Indonesia
- Woko (watercourse), watercourse in the North Region, Cameroon

== See also ==
- Wokou, term for medieval pirates that raided China and Korea
