= 2023 FIM Motocross World Championship =

Champions of the world motocross 2023

The 2023 FIM Motocross World Championship was the 67th FIM Motocross World Championship season.

In the MXGP class, Tim Gajser started the season as the reigning champion after picking up his fifth world title in 2022. The reigning MX2 world champion, Tom Vialle, did not defend his title as he moved to the United States to compete in the AMA Supercross and AMA Motocross championships.

== Regulation changes ==
Ahead of the start of the 2023 season, promoter Infront Moto Racing announced several regulation changes for the series. The most significant of these included the allocation of championship points for the top-10 finishers of the Saturday qualifying races in both classes. The winner will receive 10 points down to tenth place gaining 1. These points will not count for towards the overall score for the grand prix, but will count towards the championship standings.

In addition to this, entry fees have been lowered and freight allocation has been increased to help teams travel to non-European rounds. The MXGP class will be opened up to more than 40 riders to enter. If more than 40 riders enter a grand prix in the MXGP class, the non-Officially Approved Teams riders will have a separate practice session to the Officially Approved Teams riders. The fastest from this practice will then be allowed to join the Officially Approved Teams riders in the qualifying race.

== Race calendar and results ==
A provisional calendar was released on 11 October 2022.

The championship will be contested over twenty rounds in Europe, Asia and South America.

Round 18 was originally scheduled to be the debut of the MXGP of Vietnam. However, this was later rescheduled to be the MXGP of Italy staged at Maggiora.

=== MXGP ===
Round	Date	Grand Prix	Location	Pole position	Race 1 Winner	Race 2 Winner	Round Winner	Report
1	12 March	MXGP of Argentina	Villa La Angostura	(Spain) Jorge Prado	(Spain) Jorge Prado	(Spain) Rubén Fernández	(Spain) Rubén Fernández	
2	26 March	(Sardinia) MXGP of Sardegna	Riola Sardo	(Spain) Jorge Prado	(Spain) Jorge Prado	(Netherlands) Glenn Coldenhoff	(Netherlands) Jeffrey Herlings	
3	8 & 10 April	MXGP of Switzerland	Frauenfeld	(Spain) Jorge Prado	(Spain) Jorge Prado	(France) Maxime Renaux	(France) Maxime Renaux	
4	16 April	MXGP of Trentino	Pietramurata	(France) Romain Febvre	(Spain) Jorge Prado	(Netherlands) Jeffrey Herlings	(Spain) Jorge Prado	
5	30 April	MXGP of Portugal	Águeda	(Spain) Rubén Fernández	(Spain) Jorge Prado	(Netherlands) Jeffrey Herlings	(Netherlands) Jeffrey Herlings	
6	7 May	MXGP of Spain	intu Xanadú	(Spain) Jorge Prado	(Netherlands) Jeffrey Herlings	(Netherlands) Jeffrey Herlings	(Netherlands) Jeffrey Herlings	
7	21 May	MXGP of France	Villars-sous-Écot	(Spain) Jorge Prado	(Switzerland) Jeremy Seewer	(France) Romain Febvre	(Switzerland) Jeremy Seewer	
8	4 June	MXGP of Latvia	Ķegums	(Netherlands) Jeffrey Herlings	(Netherlands) Jeffrey Herlings	(Netherlands) Jeffrey Herlings	(Netherlands) Jeffrey Herlings	
9	11 June	MXGP of Germany	Teutschenthal	(Spain) Jorge Prado	(Spain) Jorge Prado	(Spain) Jorge Prado	(Spain) Jorge Prado	
10	25 June	MXGP of Indonesia	Samota-Sumbawa	(France) Romain Febvre	(Spain) Jorge Prado	(France) Romain Febvre	(France) Romain Febvre	
11	2 July	MXGP of Indonesia	Lombok	(Spain) Jorge Prado	(Spain) Jorge Prado	(France) Romain Febvre	(France) Romain Febvre	
12	16 July	MXGP of Czech Republic	Loket	(Spain) Jorge Prado	(France) Romain Febvre	(Netherlands) Calvin Vlaanderen	(France) Romain Febvre	
13	23 July	MXGP of Flanders	Lommel	(Netherlands) Glenn Coldenhoff	(France) Romain Febvre	(Spain) Jorge Prado	(France) Romain Febvre	
14	30 July	MXGP of Finland	Vantaa	(Spain) Jorge Prado	(France) Romain Febvre	(Spain) Jorge Prado	(France) Romain Febvre	
15	13 August	MXGP of Sweden	Uddevalla	(Spain) Jorge Prado	(Spain) Jorge Prado	(Switzerland) Jeremy Seewer	(Switzerland) Jeremy Seewer	
16	20 August	MXGP of The Netherlands	Arnhem	(France) Romain Febvre	(Spain) Jorge Prado	(France) Romain Febvre	(France) Romain Febvre	
17	3 September	MXGP of Turkey	Afyonkarahisar	(Slovenia) Tim Gajser	(France) Romain Febvre	(Slovenia) Tim Gajser	(Slovenia) Tim Gajser	
18	17 September	MXGP of Italy	Maggiora	(Italy) Alberto Forato	(Spain) Jorge Prado	(France) Romain Febvre	(Switzerland) Jeremy Seewer	
19	24 September	(United Kingdom) MXGP of Great Britain	Matterley Basin	(Spain) Jorge Prado	(Slovenia) Tim Gajser	(Slovenia) Tim Gajser	(Slovenia) Tim Gajser	

=== MX2 ===
Round	Date	Grand Prix	Location	Pole position	Race 1 Winner	Race 2 Winner	Round Winner	Report
1	12 March	MXGP of Argentina	Villa La Angostura	(Belgium) Jago Geerts	(Belgium) Jago Geerts	(Belgium) Jago Geerts	(Belgium) Jago Geerts	
2	26 March	(Sardinia) MXGP of Sardegna	Riola Sardo	(Belgium) Jago Geerts	(Netherlands) Kay de Wolf	(Belgium) Jago Geerts	(Belgium) Jago Geerts	
3	8 & 10 April	MXGP of Switzerland	Frauenfeld	(France) Thibault Benistant	(Netherlands) Roan van de Moosdijk	(France) Thibault Benistant	(France) Thibault Benistant	
4	16 April	MXGP of Trentino	Pietramurata	(Germany) Simon Längenfelder	(Belgium) Jago Geerts	(Germany) Simon Längenfelder	(Italy) Andrea Adamo	
5	30 April	MXGP of Portugal	Águeda	(Belgium) Jago Geerts	(Belgium) Jago Geerts	(Belgium) Jago Geerts	(Belgium) Jago Geerts	
6	7 May	MXGP of Spain	intu Xanadú	(Belgium) Jago Geerts	(Germany) Simon Längenfelder	(Germany) Simon Längenfelder	(Germany) Simon Längenfelder	
7	21 May	MXGP of France	Villars-sous-Écot	(Netherlands) Kay de Wolf	(France) Thibault Benistant	(Belgium) Lucas Coenen	(France) Thibault Benistant	
8	4 June	MXGP of Latvia	Ķegums	(Netherlands) Kay de Wolf	(Netherlands) Kay de Wolf	(Netherlands) Kay de Wolf	(Netherlands) Kay de Wolf	
9	11 June	MXGP of Germany	Teutschenthal	(Netherlands) Roan van de Moosdijk	(Belgium) Lucas Coenen	(Belgium) Liam Everts	(Belgium) Liam Everts	
10	25 June	MXGP of Indonesia	Samota-Sumbawa	(Belgium) Lucas Coenen	(Belgium) Lucas Coenen	(Belgium) Lucas Coenen	(Belgium) Lucas Coenen	
11	2 July	MXGP of Indonesia	Lombok	(Belgium) Jago Geerts	(Belgium) Jago Geerts	(Belgium) Jago Geerts	(Belgium) Jago Geerts	
12	16 July	MXGP of Czech Republic	Loket	(Italy) Andrea Adamo	(Belgium) Jago Geerts	(Italy) Andrea Adamo	(Belgium) Jago Geerts	
13	23 July	MXGP of Flanders	Lommel	(Belgium) Jago Geerts	(Belgium) Jago Geerts	(Belgium) Jago Geerts	(Belgium) Jago Geerts	
14	30 July	MXGP of Finland	Vantaa	(Germany) Simon Längenfelder	(Italy) Andrea Adamo	(Italy) Andrea Adamo	(Italy) Andrea Adamo	
15	13 August	MXGP of Sweden	Uddevalla	(Norway) Kevin Horgmo	(Germany) Simon Längenfelder	(Italy) Andrea Adamo	(Germany) Simon Längenfelder	
16	20 August	MXGP of The Netherlands	Arnhem	(Belgium) Lucas Coenen	(Germany) Simon Längenfelder	(Belgium) Lucas Coenen	(Belgium) Liam Everts	
17	3 September	MXGP of Turkey	Afyonkarahisar	(Germany) Simon Längenfelder	(Germany) Simon Längenfelder	(Norway) Kevin Horgmo	(Belgium) Liam Everts	
18	17 September	MXGP of Italy	Maggiora	(Germany) Simon Längenfelder	(Germany) Simon Längenfelder	(Belgium) Jago Geerts	(Belgium) Jago Geerts	
19	24 September	(United Kingdom) MXGP of Great Britain	Matterley Basin	(Germany) Simon Längenfelder	(Germany) Simon Längenfelder	(Belgium) Jago Geerts	(Belgium) Jago Geerts	

=== Grand Prix locations ===
Location of non-European Grands Prix in 2023.
Location of European Grands Prix in 2023.

== MXGP ==
=== Entry list ===
Officially Approved Teams & Riders
Team	Constructor	No	Rider	Rounds
Kawasaki Racing Team MXGP	Kawasaki	3	(France) Romain Febvre	All
Kawasaki Racing Team MXGP	Kawasaki	43	(Australia) Mitchell Evans	1, 5–17
De Baets Yamaha MX Team	Yamaha	6	(France) Benoît Paturel	1–8, 10–19
Team Gebben Van Venrooy Yamaha Racing	Yamaha	10	(Netherlands) Calvin Vlaanderen	All
JWR Honda Racing	Honda	17	(Norway) Cornelius Tøndel	15–16, 18–19
JWR Honda Racing	Honda	75	(Estonia) Hardi Roosiorg	1–8, 10–12
JWR Honda Racing	Honda	107	(Netherlands) Lars van Berkel	13
JWR Honda Racing	Honda	161	(Sweden) Alvin Östlund	All
JM Honda Racing	Honda	32	(Belgium) Brent Van Doninck	1–8
Team Ship to Cycle Honda Motoblouz SR	Honda	38	(France) Stephen Rubini	3–4, 7
Team Ship to Cycle Honda Motoblouz SR	Honda	92	(Switzerland) Valentin Guillod	1–12, 15–19
Standing Construct Honda MXGP	Honda	41	(Latvia) Pauls Jonass	1–3, 7, 15–19
Standing Construct Honda MXGP	Honda	89	(Belgium) Jeremy Van Horebeek	9, 12–14
Standing Construct Honda MXGP	Honda	189	(Netherlands) Brian Bogers	1–9, 12–19
Red Bull Gas Gas Factory Racing	Gas Gas	61	(Spain) Jorge Prado	All
Red Bull Gas Gas Factory Racing	Gas Gas	101	(Italy) Mattia Guadagnini	1–7, 17–19
Team HRC	Honda	70	(Spain) Rubén Fernández	All
Team HRC	Honda	243	(Slovenia) Tim Gajser	12–19
MRT Racing Team Beta	Beta	77	(Italy) Alessandro Lupino	1–10, 12, 15–19
MRT Racing Team Beta	Beta	919	(United Kingdom) Ben Watson	All
Red Bull KTM Factory Racing	KTM	84	(Netherlands) Jeffrey Herlings	1–9, 14–16
JK Racing Yamaha	Yamaha	87	(Switzerland) Kevin Brumann	1–6, 9, 12–15
JK Racing Yamaha	Yamaha	371	(Italy) Manuel Iacopi	18–19
JK Racing Yamaha	Yamaha	761	(Bulgaria) Julian Georgiev	17
JK Racing Yamaha	Yamaha	933	(Belgium) Ugo Moors	18
Monster Energy Yamaha Factory MXGP Team	Yamaha	91	(Switzerland) Jeremy Seewer	All
Monster Energy Yamaha Factory MXGP Team	Yamaha	259	(Netherlands) Glenn Coldenhoff	All
Monster Energy Yamaha Factory MXGP Team	Yamaha	959	(France) Maxime Renaux	1–6, 15–19
SM Action Racing Team Yuasa Battery	KTM	303	(Italy) Alberto Forato	All
Wild Card Teams & Riders
Team	Constructor	No	Rider	Rounds
Millionaire Racing Team - ABF Italia	Gas Gas	2	(Lithuania) Arminas Jasikonis	2, 4, 7
Yamaha Motor Schweiz	Yamaha	4	(Switzerland) Arnaud Tonus	3
AIT Racing Team	Yamaha	9	(Bulgaria) Petar Petrov	7, 9–13, 16
AIT Racing Team	Husqvarna	97	(Bulgaria) Michael Ivanov	3–7, 9
Team Wenger Bike	Gas Gas	13	(Switzerland) Loris Freidig	3–4
Chambers Racing	Gas Gas	16	(United Kingdom) Tom Grimshaw	4, 9, 18–19
Chambers Racing	Gas Gas	337	(United Kingdom) Glenn McCormick	19
FM Racing Team	TM	28	(Italy) Edoardo Bersanelli	18
KTM Sarholz Racing Team	KTM	29	(Germany) Henry Jacobi	7–9
KTM Sarholz Racing Team	KTM	300	(Germany) Noah Ludwig	9, 12
KTM Sarholz Racing Team	KTM	811	(United Kingdom) Adam Sterry	4, 9, 16, 19
Pol Motors	Gas Gas	34	(Netherlands) Micha-Boy De Waal	9, 16
Action Shop	Husqvarna	35	(Italy) Pietro Salina	18
Motoextreme Honda	Honda	37	(Estonia) Gert Krestinov	14
Osička MX Team	KTM	45	(Slovakia) Tomáš Kohút	4, 12
Osička MX Team	KTM	53	(Slovakia) Šimon Jošt	4, 12
A-Team Honda	Honda	46	(Italy) Tommaso Isdraele	18
ASA United Gas Gas	Gas Gas	48	(Italy) Ivo Monticelli	12, 18–19
ASA United Gas Gas	Gas Gas	212	(United Kingdom) John Adamson	3–4
SDM Corse – Aviometal MX Team	Husqvarna	52	(Sweden) Albin Gerhardsson	7–9, 12–16, 18
SDM Corse – Aviometal MX Team	Husqvarna	211	(Italy) Nicholas Lapucci	3–4
Tech32 Racing MX	KTM	57	(France) Pierre Goupillon	4, 7
	Gas Gas	62	(Estonia) Andero Lusbo	8
Team Alba Racing	Kawasaki	63	(Italy) Giacomo Zancarini	4
Gas Gas Switzerland	Gas Gas	65	(Switzerland) Robin Scheiben	3
Gas Gas Switzerland	Gas Gas	83	(Liechtenstein) Luca Bruggmann	3
AGMX Racing	Honda	66	(Switzerland) Alain Schafer	3
KTM Kosak Team	KTM	71	(Germany) Maximilian Spies	2–9, 12–16, 18–19
KTM Kosak Team	KTM	226	(Germany) Tom Koch	2, 4–9, 12–16, 18–19
Agroservimotos Honda	Honda	76	(Chile) Sergio Villaronga	1
Pro Tork KTM Racing Team	KTM	78	(Brazil) Lucas Dunka	1
Team Husqvarna Mezher	Husqvarna	82	(Costa Rica) José Pablo Chaves	1
Team Husqvarna Mezher	Husqvarna	165	(Argentina) Gonzalo Díaz Velez	1
RPM Cross / Maneco MX	Yamaha	85	(Argentina) Agustín Carrasco	1
VisuAlz Production	Husqvarna	86	(Germany) Tim Koch	9, 12
JH-MX Service	Gas Gas	94	(Netherlands) Sven van der Mierden	16
Kawasaki Racing Team	Kawasaki	98	(Argentina) Agustín Poli	1
Kawasaki Racing Team	Kawasaki	179	(Argentina) Joaquín Poli	1
Moto-Cycle Racing	Gas Gas	103	(United Kingdom) Jason Meara	19
Team Honda Pighetti Racing	Honda	107	(Netherlands) Lars van Berkel	1
Motorrad Bauerschmidt	Husqvarna	108	(Germany) Stefan Ekerold	7
Gcc Swiss Racing Team	Husqvarna	110	(Switzerland) Nicolas Bender	3
	Husqvarna	113	(Argentina) Emiliano Castillo	1
Honda Freytes Motorsport Team Motorace	Honda	114	(Bolivia) Walter Nosiglia	1
Honda Freytes Motorsport Team Motorace	Honda	833	(Argentina) Lautaro Toro	1
TALK Templant Racing Team	KTM	115	(United Kingdom) Ashton Dickinson	5–7, 9
Rubble Motorsport	Yamaha	117	(Argentina) Pablo Galletta	1
Van der Velden Motoren	KTM	118	(Netherlands) Joël van Mechelen	16
EastMX Gas Gas	Gas Gas	121	(Finland) Emil Silander	14
EastMX Gas Gas	Gas Gas	529	(Finland) Pekka Nissinen	14
Enduro Koch Racing	Husqvarna	124	(Czech Republic) Jakub Terešák	3–4, 12
Nosiglia Sport Honda Bolivia	Honda	134	(Bolivia) Daniel Choque	1
Air Power Racing Team	KTM	137	(Czech Republic) Rudolf Weschta	12
MX-Handel Racing	Husqvarna	140	(Estonia) Tanel Leok	8
Gabriel SS24 KTM	KTM	141	(South Africa) Tristan Purdon	6–7, 9, 12–13, 16, 19
KTM Silve Racing	KTM	142	(Finland) Jere Haavisto	3, 8–9, 13–16, 19
Kros Team Lunardi Racing	Honda	143	(Italy) Davide De Bortoli	18
Honda Motos Uruguay	Honda	144	(Uruguay) Nicolás Rolando	1
Motos VR Yamaha Team	Yamaha	147	(Portugal) Luís Outeiro	5
Cabscreens Crescent Yamaha	Yamaha	151	(Estonia) Harri Kullas	13, 19
Cabscreens Crescent Yamaha	Yamaha	184	(United Kingdom) James Carpenter	19
Team Santa Fé	Kawasaki	152	(Bolivia) Roy Velasco	1
DC Racing Parts / Lelli Competición	Kawasaki	157	(Argentina) Diego Soria	1
S Briggs Commercials Honda	Honda	162	(Republic of Ireland) Stuart Edmonds	19
Phoenix Lining Services/Sixty7	Husqvarna	167	(Australia) Nicholas Murray	10–11
KTM Switzerland	KTM	170	(Switzerland) Ramon Keller	3
MBP Motocross Team	KTM	181	(Lithuania) Domantas Jazdauskas	8
	Husqvarna	194	(Chile) Javier Vásquez	1
FZ Motorsport	Gas Gas	200	(Italy) Filippo Zonta	4, 18
MS Kluky Motocross Team	Honda	202	(Czech Republic) Jonáš Nedvěd	4, 12
Team 76 Sumatera Indonesia	KTM	204	(Indonesia) Hilman Maksum	10–11
Team Betemo	KTM	213	(Belgium) Nolan Cordens	13
Hot Motorbike KTM	KTM	220	(Belgium) Tanguy Gabriel	19
Hot Motorbike KTM	KTM	247	(Belgium) Bryan Boulard	7
Filten Racing	Yamaha	221	(Denmark) Mathias Jørgensen	12, 14
	KTM	237	(Switzerland) Xylian Ramella	3
Brouwer Motors	KTM	241	(Netherlands) Michel Hoenson	13, 16
Brouwer Motors	Husqvarna	826	(Netherlands) Nick Leerkes	16
Becker Racing	KTM	260	(Germany) Nico Koch	9
Becker Racing	KTM	300	(Germany) Noah Ludwig	3–4
Becker Racing	Gas Gas	278	(Belgium) Thomas Vermijl	13, 16
Yamaha Speedcity	Yamaha	271	(Portugal) Paulo Alberto	5
Pardi Racing KTM Motocross	KTM	311	(Italy) Mirko Dal Bosco	4, 12
	Husqvarna	321	(Netherlands) Mitchel van den Essenburg	16
Orion Racing Team	KTM	322	(Slovakia) Pavol Repčák	12
Team TMX Competition	Yamaha	331	(France) Adrien Malaval	7
Team Rizqy Motorsport	KTM	336	(Australia) Lewis Stewart	10–11
Camping Cupido	Yamaha	380	(Netherlands) Marcel Conijn	16
MB Team	Honda	399	(Italy) Pietro Trinchieri	4
Avant Honda Genuine Oil	Honda	400	(Argentina) Rodrigo Landa	1
Crendon Fastrack Honda	Honda	426	(United Kingdom) Conrad Mewse	3
SixtySeven Racing Team	Husqvarna	491	(Germany) Paul Haberland	3–4, 9, 12–13
SixtySeven Racing Team	Husqvarna	973	(Germany) Philipp Klakow	9
SixtySeven Racing Team	Husqvarna	991	(Germany) Mark Scheu	3–4, 7
	Yamaha	494	(Argentina) Flavio Nicolás Sastre	1
FRT Motorsport	Husqvarna	499	(Italy) Emanuele Alberio	3–4, 9, 12, 18
Apico Husqvarna	Husqvarna	500	(United Kingdom) Martin Barr	19
Mekanik Annecy	Honda	520	(France) Jimmy Clochet	4, 7
MR Motorcycle Kawasaki	Kawasaki	595	(Ecuador) Andrés Benenaula	1
MX Magnum	Gas Gas	637	(Latvia) Tomass Šileika	8
Dreams Racing	KTM	644	(Italy) Ismaele Guarise	4, 12
MxNyberg	Husqvarna	651	(Finland) Juuso Matikainen	14
Nilssons Motor Kawasaki Sverige	Kawasaki	667	(Sweden) Anton Nordström Graaf	15
FF Racing Store	Gas Gas	692	(Sweden) Danne Karlsson	15
Motos Arribas	Husqvarna	701	(Spain) Xurxo Prol	6
Motorgas Racing Team	Husqvarna	724	(Spain) Simeó Ubach	6
SC Sporthomes Husqvarna	Husqvarna	747	(Finland) Miro Sihvonen	14
HTS KTM	KTM	766	(Austria) Michael Sandner	4
MCR Racing Team Husqvarna	Husqvarna	771	(Italy) Simone Croci	4, 7, 18
Young Motion powered by Resa	Yamaha	822	(Netherlands) Mike Bolink	12–13, 16
LC Racing Team	Yamaha	848	(Italy) Giulio Nava	4, 18
AL860 Motorsport	Fantic	860	(Italy) Andrea La Scala	18
Team Green MoTec	Kawasaki	875	(Switzerland) Kim Schaffter	3, 7
	Gas Gas	888	(Turkey) Galip Alp Baysan	17
Djienem MX Racing Team	Husqvarna	988	(France) Lionel Kerhoas	10–11

==== Riders Championship ====
Points are awarded to the top-ten finishers of the qualifying race, in the following format:

Position	1st	2nd	3rd	4th	5th	6th	7th	8th	9th	10th
Points	10	9	8	7	6	5	4	3	2	1

Points are awarded to finishers of the main races, in the following format:

Position	1st	2nd	3rd	4th	5th	6th	7th	8th	9th	10th	11th	12th	13th	14th	15th	16th	17th	18th	19th	20th
Points	25	22	20	18	16	15	14	13	12	11	10	9	8	7	6	5	4	3	2	1

Pos	Nr	Rider	Bike	ARG (Argentina)		SAR (Sardinia)		SUI (Switzerland)		TRE		POR (Portugal)		ESP (Spain)		FRA (France)		LAT (Latvia)		GER (Germany)		SUM (West Nusa Tenggara)		LOM (West Nusa Tenggara)		CZE (Czech Republic)		FLA (Flanders)		FIN (Finland)		SWE (Sweden)		NED (Netherlands)		TUR (Turkey)		ITA (Italy)		GBR (United Kingdom)		Points
1	61	(Spain) Jorge Prado	Gas Gas	1^{+10}	6	1^{+10}	6	1^{+10}	3	1^{+1}	3	1^{+5}	6	2^{+10}	5	4^{+10}	3	2^{+9}	3	1^{+10}	1	1^{+7}	3	1^{+10}	2	3^{+10}	2	3^{+6}	1	3^{+10}	1	1^{+10}	6	1^{+8}	4	13	9	1^{+9}	6	4^{+10}	18	921
2	3	(France) Romain Febvre	Kawasaki	2^{+6}	5	11^{+6}	4	3^{+9}	2	12^{+10}	4	2^{+6}	3	DNS	DNS	3^{+4}	1	6^{+6}	2	6^{+6}	3	2^{+10}	1	2^{+8}	1	1^{+8}	4	1^{+9}	2	1^{+9}	2	2^{+6}	2	2^{+10}	1	1	3	Ret^{+8}	1	5^{+9}	2	854
3	91	(Switzerland) Jeremy Seewer	Yamaha	17	3	6^{+4}	7	20^{+5}	5	16^{+7}	5	5^{+7}	4	8^{+8}	4	1^{+9}	2	7	5	2^{+9}	5	3^{+9}	2	4^{+7}	4	2^{+9}	3	5^{+7}	4	2^{+6}	5	3^{+8}	1	3^{+7}	2	8	10	2^{+3}	4	2	4	759
4	259	(Netherlands) Glenn Coldenhoff	Yamaha	7^{+4}	14	5^{+9}	1	8^{+1}	20	8^{+2}	6	4	7	4^{+5}	6	9	6	4^{+7}	4	4^{+4}	2	4^{+8}	5	3^{+4}	3	4^{+6}	7	2^{+10}	3	4^{+7}	3	5	9	4^{+9}	3	6	8	7^{+1}	9	3^{+4}	5	695
5	70	(Spain) Rubén Fernández	Honda	5^{+7}	1	Ret^{+5}	11	5^{+2}	8	3^{+8}	7	7^{+10}	2	5^{+4}	2	5^{+5}	4	3^{+8}	18	3^{+5}	4	5^{+6}	6	5^{+9}	5	6^{+7}	6	11^{+4}	6	Ret^{+8}	DNS	6^{+4}	8	17^{+4}	8	11	4	5^{+6}	3	6^{+7}	3	654
6	10	(Netherlands) Calvin Vlaanderen	Yamaha	11^{+5}	10	3^{+3}	5	4^{+4}	7	6	12	8^{+8}	5	7^{+2}	8	8^{+6}	5	5^{+4}	7	7^{+2}	11	6^{+5}	4	7^{+5}	7	5^{+4}	1	4^{+8}	5	5^{+3}	7	15^{+5}	11	Ret	DNS	4	5	4^{+5}	11	7^{+5}	6	599
7	303	(Italy) Alberto Forato	KTM	9	13	8	9	12^{+7}	6	5	15	9	15	6^{+6}	7	Ret^{+7}	DNS	8^{+5}	6	5^{+8}	7	7	8	8^{+3}	8	17^{+2}	10	6	7	7^{+2}	18	7^{+2}	7	6^{+5}	7	5	7	3^{+10}	5	DNS	DNS	490
8	84	(Netherlands) Jeffrey Herlings	KTM	4^{+1}	2	2^{+8}	2	6^{+8}	4	9^{+4}	1	3^{+9}	1	1^{+9}	1	2^{+8}	Ret	1^{+10}	1	20^{+7}	DNS									8^{+1}	4	8^{+7}	4	DNS	DNS							456
9	92	(Switzerland) Valentin Guillod	Honda	14^{+2}	12	17	18	7^{+3}	9	7^{+6}	11	10^{+1}	9	9^{+1}	11	7^{+3}	7	15	8	8^{+3}	13	10^{+1}	9	6^{+6}	6	11^{+1}	Ret					Ret^{+3}	19	15	13	9	18	10	8	11^{+6}	8	363
10	959	(France) Maxime Renaux	Yamaha	3^{+8}	9	4	3	2^{+6}	1	2^{+9}	2	13	11	DNS	DNS																	13	3	7^{+1}	6	3	2	18	12	DNS	DNS	314
11	243	(Slovenia) Tim Gajser	Honda																							9^{+5}	5	15^{+1}	13	6	6	10^{+9}	5	5^{+6}	5	2	1	9^{+7}	2	1^{+8}	1	298
12	6	(France) Benoît Paturel	Yamaha	13	11	13^{+1}	14	10	15	10	Ret	11	14	Ret^{+3}	9	Ret	9	Ret^{+3}	DNS			8^{+4}	11	9^{+2}	10	10	Ret	13	11	Ret^{+4}	11	Ret^{+1}	14	Ret^{+3}	12	10	12	8	15	10^{+3}	25	277
13	919	(United Kingdom) Ben Watson	Beta	12	15	14	13	11	10	11	13	12	12	DNS	DNS	Ret	Ret	11	Ret	14	8	12	12	18	12	14	16	9	12	18	15	19	Ret	11	11	16	16	13	16	13	11	252
14	101	(Italy) Mattia Guadagnini	Gas Gas	10^{+9}	8	10^{+2}	12	9	12	4^{+3}	10	6^{+3}	8	3^{+7}	3	6^{+2}	Ret																			7	11	11^{+4}	13	DNS	DNS	249
15	189	(Netherlands) Brian Bogers	Honda	16	7	7	20	25	16	22	9	16^{+2}	13	11	19	11	11	9^{+2}	Ret	DNS	DNS					13	20	10^{+5}	10	10	12	21	12	9^{+2}	10	14	13	14	18	16	10	243
16	43	(Australia) Mitchell Evans	Kawasaki	DNS	DNS							18	21	13	13	12	15	17	11	9^{+1}	6	9^{+3}	7	12	9	7	11	8	16	11	10	9	17	10	15	12	17					235
17	161	(Sweden) Alvin Östlund	Honda	15	16	16	17	17	19	13	17	15	16	18	Ret	15	16	Ret	10	16	15	11	10	10^{+1}	11	18	14	16	18	12	9	Ret	15	12	14	15	14	17	21	20	19	209
18	226	(Germany) Tom Koch	KTM			15	16			19	19	Ret	18	12	12	14	10	14	16	10	10					16	9	20	17	13	16	14	13	13	17			16	14	8	9	187
19	41	(Latvia) Pauls Jonass	Honda	6^{+3}	4	12	10	Ret	Ret							DNS	DNS															4	10	8	9	20	6	6^{+2}	7	9^{+2}	7	185
20	77	(Italy) Alessandro Lupino	Beta	Ret	17	19	15	15	11	15	14	14	Ret	10	10	13	14	10	9	13	Ret	18^{+2}	DNS			20	12					12	Ret	Ret	Ret	17	15	15	10	14^{+1}	12	184
21	71	(Germany) Maximilian Spies	KTM			18	19	18	18	27	27	17	17	15	18	24	18	16	12	18	16					12	13	12^{+2}	15	14	14	20	18	14	18			20	19	18	16	126
22	32	(Belgium) Brent Van Doninck	Honda	8	Ret	9^{+7}	8	16	21	23^{+5}	8	Ret^{+4}	10	16	Ret	10^{+1}	8	Ret^{+1}	DNS																							114
23	89	(Belgium) Jeremy Van Horebeek	Honda																	11	9					8^{+3}	8	7^{+3}	9	9^{+5}	8											110
24	9	(Bulgaria) Petar Petrov	Yamaha													18	17			Ret	Ret	13	13	11	13	21	Ret	19	Ret					16	16							53
25	75	(Estonia) Hardi Roosiorg	Honda	19	18	Ret	Ret	19	Ret	33	25	Ret	22	Ret	15	20	Ret	18	15			14	14	13	14	Ret	22															52
26	142	(Finland) Jere Haavisto	KTM					Ret	DNS									13	Ret	17	14							17	20	20	13	11	16	DNS	DNS					21	20	49
27	87	(Switzerland) Kevin Brumann	Yamaha	DNS	DNS	20	21	21	14	18	22	DNS	DNS	14	17					25	18					15	Ret	18	14	19	20	Ret	Ret									44
28	151	(Estonia) Harri Kullas	Yamaha																									14	8											12	13	37
29	48	(Italy) Ivo Monticelli	Gas Gas																							24	15											12	17	17	14	30
30	29	(Germany) Henry Jacobi	KTM													Ret	12	12	Ret	12	19																					29
31	38	(France) Stephen Rubini	Honda					14	13	Ret	DNS					17	13																									27
32	336	(Australia) Lewis Stewart	KTM																			15	15	14	15																	25
33	167	(Australia) Nicholas Murray	Husqvarna																			16	16	15	16																	21
34	811	(United Kingdom) Adam Sterry	KTM							17	16									Ret	17													Ret	DNS					19	15	21
35	204	(Indonesia) Hilman Maksum	KTM																			17	17	16	17																	17
36	86	(Germany) Tim Koch	Husqvarna																	15	12					26	26															15
37	52	(Sweden) Albin Gerhardsson	Husqvarna													26	22	Ret	20	26	23					27	21	21	19	16	Ret	16	20	Ret	20			25	22			15
38	17	(Norway) Cornelius Tøndel	Honda																													18	Ret	DNS	DNS			22	25	15	17	13
39	988	(France) Lionel Kerhoas	Husqvarna																			19	18	17	18																	12
40	97	(Bulgaria) Michael Ivanov	Husqvarna					22	Ret	29	20	20	20	20	14	21	21			22	Ret																					11
41	140	(Estonia) Tanel Leok	Husqvarna															19	13																							10
42	57	(France) Pierre Goupillon	KTM							14	18					DNS	DNS																									10
43	37	(Estonia) Gert Krestinov	Honda																											15	17											10
44	115	(United Kingdom) Ashton Dickinson	KTM									21	23	19	16	25	20			24	20																					9
45	4	(Switzerland) Arnaud Tonus	Yamaha					13	Ret																																	8
46	637	(Latvia) Tomass Šileika	Gas Gas															21	14																							7
47	141	(South Africa) Tristan Purdon	KTM											17	21	22	23			28	24					23	23	26	22					18	22					DNS	DNS	7
48	53	(Slovakia) Šimon Jošt	KTM							30	29															19	17															6
49	747	(Finland) Miro Sihvonen	Husqvarna																											17	19											6
50	991	(Germany) Mark Scheu	Husqvarna					26	25	28	Ret					16	25																									5
51	62	(Estonia) Andero Lusbo	Gas Gas															20	17																							5
52	761	(Bulgaria) Julian Georgiev	Yamaha																																	18	19					5
53	179	(Argentina) Joaquín Poli	Kawasaki	18	19																																					5
54	692	(Sweden) Danne Karlsson	Gas Gas																													17	Ret									4
55	426	(United Kingdom) Conrad Mewse	Honda					24	17																																	4
56	271	(Portugal) Paulo Alberto	Yamaha									19	19																													4
57	45	(Slovakia) Tomáš Kohút	KTM							24	23															22	18															3
58	888	(Turkey) Galip Alp Baysan	Gas Gas																																	19	20					3
59	34	(Netherlands) Micha-Boy De Waal	Gas Gas																	27	21													Ret	19							2
60	260	(Germany) Nico Koch	KTM																	19	22																					2
61	771	(Italy) Simone Croci	Husqvarna							31	26					23	19																					24	28			2
62	380	(Netherlands) Marcel Conijn	Yamaha																															19	23							2
63	181	(Lithuania) Domantas Jazdauskas	KTM															Ret	19																							2
64	848	(Italy) Giulio Nava	Yamaha							26	Ret																											19	24			2
65	331	(France) Adrien Malaval	Yamaha													19	Ret																									2
66	221	(Denmark) Mathias Jørgensen	Yamaha																							Ret	19			DNS	DNS											2
67	2	(Lithuania) Arminas Jasikonis	Gas Gas			Ret	22			20	21					Ret	DNS																									1
68	107	(Netherlands) Lars van Berkel	Honda	20	Ret																							22	21													1
69	94	(Netherlands) Sven van der Mierden	Gas Gas																															20	21							1
70	724	(Spain) Simeó Ubach	Husqvarna											Ret	20																											1
71	98	(Argentina) Agustín Poli	Kawasaki	21	20																																					1
72	143	(Italy) Davide De Bortoli	Honda																																			23	20			1
	651	(Finland) Juuso Matikainen	Husqvarna																											21	21											0
	667	(Sweden) Anton Nordström Graaf	Kawasaki																													22	21									0
	200	(Italy) Filippo Zonta	Gas Gas							32	24																											21	23			0
	826	(Netherlands) Nick Leerkes	Husqvarna																															21	24							0
	300	(Germany) Noah Ludwig	KTM					Ret	28	DNQ	DNQ									21	Ret					25	Ret															0
	371	(Italy) Manuel Iacopi	Yamaha																																			Ret	Ret	25	21	0
	76	(Chile) Sergio Villaronga	Honda	26	21																																					0
	766	(Austria) Michael Sandner	KTM							21	Ret																															0
	82	(Costa Rica) José Pablo Chaves	Husqvarna	22	22																																					0
	16	(United Kingdom) Tom Grimshaw	Gas Gas							Ret	DNS									Ret	26																	28	27	22	23	0
	529	(Finland) Pekka Nissinen	Gas Gas																											23	22											0
	103	(United Kingdom) Jason Meara	Gas Gas																																					24	22	0
	124	(Czech Republic) Jakub Terešák	Husqvarna					27	22	25	Ret															Ret	DNS															0
	118	(Netherlands) Joël van Mechelen	KTM																															22	25							0
	121	(Finland) Emil Silander	Gas Gas																											22	Ret											0
	822	(Netherlands) Mike Bolink	Yamaha																							31	30	23	23					23	26							0
	83	(Liechtenstein) Luca Bruggmann	Gas Gas					23	23																																	0
	400	(Argentina) Rodrigo Landa	Honda	23	23																																					0
	499	(Italy) Emanuele Alberio	Husqvarna					29	26	35	28									23	25					29	24											27	DNS			0
	162	(Republic of Ireland) Stuart Edmonds	Honda																																					23	Ret	0
	241	(Netherlands) Michel Hoenson	KTM																									25	24					25	28							0
	278	(Belgium) Thomas Vermijl	Gas Gas																									24	25					26	27							0
	491	(Germany) Paul Haberland	Husqvarna					28	24	Ret	DNS									Ret	Ret					Ret	25	Ret	DNS													0
	833	(Argentina) Lautaro Toro	Honda	24	25																																					0
	85	(Argentina) Agustín Carrasco	Yamaha	25	24																																					0
	247	(Belgium) Bryan Boulard	KTM													27	24																									0
	321	(Netherlands) Mitchel van den Essenburg	Husqvarna																															24	Ret							0
	500	(United Kingdom) Martin Barr	Husqvarna																																					Ret	24	0
	46	(Italy) Tommaso Isdraele	Honda																																			26	26			0
	220	(Belgium) Tanguy Gabriel	KTM																																					26	26	0
	194	(Chile) Javier Vásquez	Husqvarna	27	26																																					0
	213	(Belgium) Nolan Cordens	KTM																									27	26													0
	875	(Switzerland) Kim Schaffter	Kawasaki					34	31							28	26																									0
	337	(United Kingdom) Glenn McCormick	Gas Gas																																					27	27	0
	144	(Uruguay) Nicolás Rolando	Honda	29	27																																					0
	137	(Czech Republic) Rudolf Weschta	KTM																							30	27															0
	13	(Switzerland) Loris Freidig	Gas Gas					32	27	DNQ	DNQ																															0
	494	(Argentina) Flavio Nicolás Sastre	Yamaha	30	28																																					0
	311	(Italy) Mirko Dal Bosco	KTM							DNQ	DNQ															33	28															0
	595	(Ecuador) Andrés Benenaula	Kawasaki	28	Ret																																					0
	322	(Slovakia) Pavol Repčák	KTM																							28	Ret															0
	28	(Italy) Edoardo Bersanelli	TM																																			29	31			0
	113	(Argentina) Emiliano Castillo	Husqvarna	31	29																																					0
	202	(Czech Republic) Jonáš Nedvěd	Honda							DNQ	DNQ															34	29															0
	110	(Switzerland) Nicolas Bender	Husqvarna					36	29																																	0
	35	(Italy) Pietro Salina	Husqvarna																																			Ret	29			0
	860	(Italy) Andrea La Scala	Fantic																																			30	30			0
	212	(United Kingdom) John Adamson	Gas Gas					30	Ret	34	31																															0
	644	(Italy) Ismaele Guarise	KTM							DNQ	30															32	Ret															0
	157	(Argentina) Diego Soria	Kawasaki	33	30																																					0
	65	(Switzerland) Robin Scheiben	Gas Gas					35	30																																	0
	170	(Switzerland) Ramon Keller	KTM					31	33																																	0
	165	(Argentina) Gonzalo Díaz Velez	Husqvarna	32	Ret																																					0
	66	(Switzerland) Alain Schafer	Honda					DNQ	32																																	0
	237	(Switzerland) Xylian Ramella	KTM					33	DNS																																	0
	211	(Italy) Nicholas Lapucci	Husqvarna					Ret	DNS	Ret	DNS																															0
	117	(Argentina) Pablo Galletta	Yamaha	Ret	Ret																																					0
	152	(Bolivia) Roy Velasco	Kawasaki	Ret	Ret																																					0
	520	(France) Jimmy Clochet	Honda							Ret	DNS					DNS	DNS																									0
	973	(Germany) Philipp Klakow	Husqvarna																	Ret	DNS																					0
	108	(Germany) Stefan Ekerold	Husqvarna													Ret	DNS																									0
	701	(Spain) Xurxo Prol	Husqvarna											Ret	DNS																											0
	147	(Portugal) Luís Outeiro	Yamaha									Ret	DNS																													0
	78	(Brazil) Lucas Dunka	KTM	Ret	DNS																																					0
	114	(Bolivia) Walter Nosiglia	Honda	Ret	DNS																																					0
	933	(Belgium) Ugo Moors	Yamaha																																			DNS	DNS			0
	184	(United Kingdom) James Carpenter	Yamaha																																					DNS	DNS	0
	63	(Italy) Giacomo Zancarini	Kawasaki							DNQ	DNQ																															0
	399	(Italy) Pietro Trinchieri	Honda							DNQ	DNQ																															0
	134	(Bolivia) Daniel Choque	Honda	DNQ	DNQ																																					0
Pos	Nr	Rider	Bike	ARG (Argentina)		SAR (Sardinia)		SUI (Switzerland)		TRE		POR (Portugal)		ESP (Spain)		FRA (France)		LAT (Latvia)		GER (Germany)		SUM (West Nusa Tenggara)		LOM (West Nusa Tenggara)		CZE (Czech Republic)		FLA (Flanders)		FIN (Finland)		SWE (Sweden)		NED (Netherlands)		TUR (Turkey)		ITA (Italy)		GBR (United Kingdom)		Points

==== Manufacturers Championship ====
Pos	Bike	ARG (Argentina)		SAR (Sardinia)		SUI (Switzerland)		TRE		POR (Portugal)		ESP (Spain)		FRA (France)		LAT (Latvia)		GER (Germany)		SUM (West Nusa Tenggara)		LOM (West Nusa Tenggara)		CZE (Czech Republic)		FLA (Flanders)		FIN (Finland)		SWE (Sweden)		NED (Netherlands)		TUR (Turkey)		ITA (Italy)		GBR (United Kingdom)		Points
1	Yamaha	3^{+8}	3	3^{+9}	1	2^{+6}	1	2^{+9}	2	4^{+8}	4	4^{+8}	4	1^{+9}	2	4^{+7}	4	2^{+9}	2	3^{+9}	2	3^{+7}	3	2^{+9}	1	2^{+10}	3	2^{+7}	3	3^{+8}	1	3^{+9}	2	3	2	2^{+5}	4	2^{+5}	4	939
2	Gas Gas	1^{+10}	6	1^{+10}	6	1^{+10}	3	1^{+3}	3	1^{+5}	6	2^{+10}	3	4^{+10}	3	2^{+9}	3	1^{+10}	1	1^{+7}	3	1^{+10}	2	3^{+10}	2	3^{+6}	1	3^{+10}	1	1^{+10}	6	1^{+8}	4	7	9	1^{+9}	6	4^{+10}	14	937
3	Kawasaki	2^{+6}	5	11^{+6}	4	3^{+9}	2	12^{+10}	4	2^{+6}	3	13	13	3^{+4}	1	6^{+6}	2	6^{+6}	3	2^{+10}	1	2^{+8}	1	1^{+8}	4	1^{+9}	2	1^{+9}	2	2^{+6}	2	2^{+10}	1	1	3	Ret^{+8}	1	5^{+9}	2	870
4	Honda	5^{+7}	1	7^{+7}	8	5^{+3}	8	3^{+8}	7	7^{+10}	2	5^{+4}	2	5^{+5}	4	3^{+8}	8	3^{+5}	4	5^{+6}	6	5^{+9}	5	6^{+7}	5	7^{+5}	6	6^{+8}	6	4^{+9}	5	5^{+6}	5	2	1	5^{+7}	2	1^{+8}	1	786
5	KTM	4^{+1}	2	2^{+8}	2	6^{+8}	4	5^{+4}	1	3^{+9}	1	1^{+9}	1	2^{+8}	10	1^{+10}	1	5^{+8}	7	7	8	8^{+3}	8	12^{+2}	9	6^{+2}	7	7^{+2}	4	7^{+7}	4	6^{+5}	7	5	7	3^{+11}	5	8	9	749
6	Beta	12	15	14	13	11	10	11	13	12	12	10	10	13	14	10	9	13	8	12^{+2}	12	18	12	14	12	9	12	18	15	12	Ret	11	11	16	15	13	10	13^{+1}	11	324
7	Husqvarna	27	26			22	24	28	20	20	20	20	14	16	19	19	13	15	12	16	16	15	16	26	21	21	19	16	19	16	20	21	20			24	22	Ret	24	80
	TM																																			29	31			0
	Fantic																																			30	30			0
Pos	Bike	ARG (Argentina)		SAR (Sardinia)		SUI (Switzerland)		TRE		POR (Portugal)		ESP (Spain)		FRA (France)		LAT (Latvia)		GER (Germany)		SUM (West Nusa Tenggara)		LOM (West Nusa Tenggara)		CZE (Czech Republic)		FLA (Flanders)		FIN (Finland)		SWE (Sweden)		NED (Netherlands)		TUR (Turkey)		ITA (Italy)		GBR (United Kingdom)		Points

== MX2 ==
=== Entry list ===
Officially Approved Teams & Riders
Team	Constructor	No	Rider	Rounds
Big Van World MTX Kawasaki	Kawasaki	11	(Denmark) Mikkel Haarup	1
Big Van World MTX Kawasaki	Kawasaki	12	(United States) Jack Chambers	3–9, 18–19
Big Van World MTX Kawasaki	Kawasaki	882	(United Kingdom) Charlie Cole	9
SM Action Racing Team Yuasa Battery	KTM	17	(Norway) Cornelius Tøndel	1–6
SM Action Racing Team Yuasa Battery	KTM	64	(Italy) Lorenzo Ciabatti	2–6, 8–9, 12, 15–16
SM Action Racing Team Yuasa Battery	KTM	123	(Italy) Federico Tuani	7, 12–13, 17–19
SM Action Racing Team Yuasa Battery	KTM	669	(Italy) Luca Ruffini	18
SM Action Racing Team Yuasa Battery	KTM	770	(United States) Devin Simonson	8–10
F&H Kawasaki MX2 Racing Team	Kawasaki	22	(Spain) David Braceras	1–7, 12–19
F&H Kawasaki MX2 Racing Team	Kawasaki	24	(Norway) Kevin Horgmo	All
Fantic Factory Team Maddii	Fantic	27	(France) Tom Guyon	1–3, 6–7
Fantic Factory Team Maddii	Fantic	312	(Norway) Håkon Østerhagen	13–14
Nestaan Husqvarna Factory Racing	Husqvarna	39	(Netherlands) Roan van de Moosdijk	1–12, 16–19
Nestaan Husqvarna Factory Racing	Husqvarna	74	(Netherlands) Kay de Wolf	1–13, 18–19
Nestaan Husqvarna Factory Racing	Husqvarna	96	(Belgium) Lucas Coenen	All
Monster Energy Yamaha Factory MX2 Team	Yamaha	44	(Netherlands) Rick Elzinga	1–6, 9–19
Monster Energy Yamaha Factory MX2 Team	Yamaha	93	(Belgium) Jago Geerts	1–7, 9–14, 16–19
Monster Energy Yamaha Factory MX2 Team	Yamaha	198	(France) Thibault Benistant	1–13, 18–19
Racestore KTM Racing Team	KTM	67	(Spain) Yago Martínez	1–6, 8–9
Racestore KTM Racing Team	KTM	174	(Italy) Alessandro Valeri	12–13, 15–16, 18
Red Bull KTM Factory Racing	KTM	72	(Belgium) Liam Everts	All
Red Bull KTM Factory Racing	KTM	79	(Belgium) Sacha Coenen	5–19
Red Bull KTM Factory Racing	KTM	80	(Italy) Andrea Adamo	All
JM Honda Racing	Honda	122	(South Africa) Camden McLellan	1, 7–19
JM Honda Racing	Honda	408	(Netherlands) Scott Smulders	18–19
JM Honda Racing	Honda	912	(United Kingdom) Joel Rizzi	4–6
Team Ship to Cycle Honda Motoblouz SR	Honda	125	(Finland) Emil Weckman	1–7, 10–19
TEM JP253 KTM Racing Team	KTM	253	(Slovenia) Jan Pancar	All
JM Racing Astra Honda	Honda	325	(Indonesia) Delvintor Alfarizi	3, 9–17
Riley Racing	Yamaha	427	(Norway) Håkon Fredriksen	
Riley Racing	Yamaha	912	(United Kingdom) Joel Rizzi	2
Red Bull Gas Gas Factory Racing	Gas Gas	516	(Germany) Simon Längenfelder	1–6, 10–19
Wild Card Teams & Riders
Team	Constructor	No	Rider	Rounds
WZ Racing Team	KTM	11	(Denmark) Mikkel Haarup	3–10
WZ Racing Team	KTM	51	(Spain) Oriol Oliver	2–9, 12–19
WZ Racing Team	KTM	696	(Switzerland) Mike Gwerder	3–9, 12–13
CEC Racing	Husqvarna	14	(Sweden) Tim Edberg	15
Schmicker Racing	KTM	18	(Denmark) William Kleemann	2–6, 8–9, 12–16, 18–19
Gabriel SS24 KTM	KTM	23	(United Kingdom) Taylor Hammal	5–7, 9, 12–13, 16, 19
FM MaxBart Racing	KTM	31	(Italy) Francesco Bassi	4, 7, 9, 18
	Honda	40	(Iran) Alireza Ahmadi	17
Team RX Moto	KTM	42	(Finland) Sampo Rainio	14
Team RX Moto	Husqvarna	524	(Finland) Miro Varjonen	14
Turci KTM Racing Team	KTM	49	(Italy) Mattia Dusi	18
SMX Racing Team	Yamaha	50	(Czech Republic) Daniel Mandys	12
Diana MX Team	Husqvarna	56	(Italy) Lorenzo Corti	3–4, 7–9, 18–19
JK Racing Yamaha	Yamaha	64	(Italy) Lorenzo Ciabatti	18–19
Team VRT KTM Factory Juniors	KTM	73	(Italy) Ferruccio Zanchi	7, 12–13
Team VRT KTM Factory Juniors	KTM	282	(France) Marc-Antoine Rossi	7, 12
RPM Cross / Maneco MX	Yamaha	81	(Argentina) Fermín Ciccimarra	1
Honda Ecuador	Honda	88	(Ecuador) Italo Medina	1
Honda Ecuador	Honda	90	(Ecuador) Andrés Feicán	1
	Gas Gas	95	(Argentina) Maximo Caceres	1
Team VHR Racing	Gas Gas	100	(France) Scotty Verhaeghe	10–12
Team VHR Racing	Gas Gas	207	(France) Xavier Cazal	13–14
Team VHR Racing	Gas Gas	517	(Sweden) Isak Gifting	4–9, 12–19
Altherm JCR Yamaha	Yamaha	106	(New Zealand) James Scott	19
VIP Lounge MX Team	KTM	111	(Netherlands) Romano Aspers	16
VIP Lounge MX Team	KTM	365	(Spain) Adrià Monné	5–6
VIP Lounge MX Team	KTM	817	(Netherlands) Raf Meuwissen	16, 19
Team Husqvarna Mezher	Husqvarna	112	(Ecuador) Pedro Suárez	1
Team Husqvarna Mezher	Husqvarna	120	(Uruguay) Franco Iavecchia	1
Hutten Metaal Yamaha	Yamaha	132	(Italy) Andrea Bonacorsi	13, 19
Hutten Metaal Yamaha	Yamaha	432	(Netherlands) Ivano van Erp	13
Best Matic Team	Kawasaki	148	(Italy) Tommaso Lodi	18
Team Green MoTec	Kawasaki	153	(Switzerland) Flavio Wolf	3
KTM Bolivia	KTM	154	(Bolivia) Carlos Andrés Padilla	1
Kawasaki Greentech Indonesia	Kawasaki	164	(Indonesia) Diva Ismayana	10–11
Motormix Racing Team	Gas Gas	177	(Italy) Alessandro Manucci	12, 18
Team Leoparden Racing	Husqvarna	180	(Sweden) Leopold Ambjörnsson	1–3
Husqvarna Motorcycles Slovenia	Husqvarna	183	(Slovenia) Jaka Peklaj	17–18
MBP Motocross Team	KTM	188	(Lithuania) Erlandas Mackonis	8
Honda Freytes Motorsport Team Motorace	Honda	191	(Argentina) Juan Ignacio Salgado	1
MRA Beton	KTM	199	(Slovakia) Jaroslav Katriňák	12
AG MX Racing	Honda	201	(Switzerland) Luca Diserens	3
A-Team Honda	Honda	210	(Italy) Matteo Puccinelli	18
Gas Gas Ecuador	Gas Gas	219	(Ecuador) Kayl Delgado	1
Team Hiebert Motoshop	Honda	225	(Paraguay) Thiago Hiebert	1
GT Racing KTM	KTM	234	(France) Bogdan Krajewski	7
RPM Cross	Kawasaki	244	(Argentina) Andrés Sánchez	1
Kawasaki Racing Team	Kawasaki	249	(Argentina) Tomás Moyano	1
Husqvarna Schweiz/Big Kaiser	Husqvarna	254	(Portugal) Alexandre Marques	3, 5
ALS Motorsports	Kawasaki	255	(Malaysia) Muhammad Hakimi Iroly	11
Wozniak MX Racing Team	Yamaha	256	(Denmark) Magnus Smith	12
SC Sporthomes Husqvarna	Husqvarna	261	(Estonia) Jörgen-Matthias Talviku	13–14, 19
Lexa MX Racing Team	Husqvarna	285	(United Kingdom) Calum Mitchell	19
La Higuerita MX	KTM	288	(Argentina) Ignacio Liprandi	1
	Gas Gas	299	(Chile) Jeremías Schiele	1
LF Motorsport	Yamaha	301	(France) Noah Vampa	3, 7
Young Motion powered by Resa	Yamaha	313	(Czech Republic) Petr Polák	3–4, 7, 9, 12–13
Young Motion powered by Resa	Yamaha	744	(France) Saad Soulimani	9, 12–13
Young Motion powered by Resa	Yamaha	817	(Netherlands) Raf Meuwissen	3–4
Astra Honda Racing Team	Honda	317	(Indonesia) Nuzul Ramzidan	10
9MM Energy Drink BUD Racing	Kawasaki	319	(France) Quentin Prugnières	7
DZAS Racing Team	Husqvarna	333	(Malaysia) Hassan Mohamad Zubir	10
PowerbyJJ Racing Team	Husqvarna	338	(Sweden) Filip Olsson	2–4, 7–8, 12–16
Schruf Racing Team	KTM	401	(Austria) Marcel Stauffer	4, 9, 12
KMP Honda Racing powered by Krettek	Honda	408	(Netherlands) Scott Smulders	9, 13, 16
Oragno MX Racing	Husqvarna	421	(Italy) Eugenio Barbaglia	18
Q Racing Team	Gas Gas	437	(Czech Republic) Martin Venhoda	12
Yamaha Motor France	Yamaha	446	(France) Adrien Petit	7, 13
KTM Sarholz Racing Team	KTM	470	(Germany) Peter König	9, 16
FF Racing Team	Gas Gas	505	(Sweden) Arvid Lüning	2–4, 7–9, 13–16, 18–19
SixtySeven Racing Team	Husqvarna	511	(Germany) Jan Krug	3–4, 9, 13, 16
Fantic Nederland	Fantic	521	(Netherlands) Boris Blanken	16, 19
Rizqy Motorsport	KTM	532	(Indonesia) Nakami Vidi Makarim	10–11
KTM Beddini KX2	KTM	533	(Italy) Valerio Lata	18
ASA United Gas Gas	Gas Gas	579	(United Kingdom) Bobby Bruce	3–7, 9
Silve Racing	KTM	596	(Finland) Eliel Lehtinen	14
Steels Dr. Jack TM Racing	TM	651	(Estonia) Meico Vettik	13
	Yamaha	661	(Belgium) Pako Destercq	18
	KTM	715	(Netherlands) Jaap Janssen	16
	KTM	744	(France) Saad Soulimani	7
IPONE Thailand MX Team	KTM	777	(Thailand) Jiraj Wannalak	10–11
GJV Racing	Gas Gas	912	(United Kingdom) Joel Rizzi	13, 16
Chave Motos	Honda	913	(France) Enzo Dubois	7
Team Alba Racing	Kawasaki	931	(San Marino) Andrea Zanotti	4
MCR Racing Team Husqvarna	Husqvarna	931	(San Marino) Andrea Zanotti	18

==== Riders Championship ====
Points are awarded to the top-ten finishers of the qualifying race, in the following format:

Position	1st	2nd	3rd	4th	5th	6th	7th	8th	9th	10th
Points	10	9	8	7	6	5	4	3	2	1

Points are awarded to finishers of the main races, in the following format:

Position	1st	2nd	3rd	4th	5th	6th	7th	8th	9th	10th	11th	12th	13th	14th	15th	16th	17th	18th	19th	20th
Points	25	22	20	18	16	15	14	13	12	11	10	9	8	7	6	5	4	3	2	1

Pos	Nr	Rider	Bike	ARG (Argentina)		SAR (Sardinia)		SUI (Switzerland)		TRE		POR (Portugal)		ESP (Spain)		FRA (France)		LAT (Latvia)		GER (Germany)		SUM (West Nusa Tenggara)		LOM (West Nusa Tenggara)		CZE (Czech Republic)		FLA (Flanders)		FIN (Finland)		SWE (Sweden)		NED (Netherlands)		TUR (Turkey)		ITA (Italy)		GBR (United Kingdom)		Points
1	80	(Italy) Andrea Adamo	KTM	3^{+9}	3	5^{+3}	6	3^{+6}	2	2^{+8}	2	2^{+8}	5	5^{+6}	3	3^{+7}	3	5^{+3}	4	3^{+8}	2	3	7	2^{+7}	3	13^{+10}	1	4^{+7}	13	1^{+5}	1	10^{+8}	1	2^{+4}	5	10	5	3^{+7}	3	4^{+9}	3	826
2	93	(Belgium) Jago Geerts	Yamaha	1^{+10}	1	2^{+10}	1	7^{+8}	3	1^{+7}	7	1^{+10}	1	2^{+10}	2	DNS	DNS			13	7	5^{+4}	3	1^{+10}	1	1^{+5}	3	1^{+10}	1	Ret^{+8}	DNS			4^{+6}	3	2^{+7}	4	2^{+9}	1	3^{+8}	1	759
3	516	(Germany) Simon Längenfelder	Gas Gas	8^{+8}	5	3^{+8}	7	5	5	9^{+10}	1	5^{+9}	4	1^{+8}	1							4^{+7}	10	5^{+8}	2	4^{+9}	2	3^{+8}	3	2^{+10}	2	1^{+7}	2	1^{+9}	6	1^{+10}	6	1^{+10}	2	1^{+10}	4	755
4	72	(Belgium) Liam Everts	KTM	5^{+7}	13	9^{+5}	8	8^{+5}	6	3^{+6}	3	25^{+7}	11	7^{+1}	6	2^{+8}	4	4^{+7}	8	2^{+9}	1	2^{+8}	2	6^{+6}	4	17^{+8}	6	5^{+6}	4	3^{+7}	4	2^{+9}	3	3^{+8}	2	3^{+9}	2	4	Ret	7^{+2}	5	734
5	96	(Belgium) Lucas Coenen	Husqvarna	Ret^{+3}	9	6^{+4}	4	6	16	7^{+4}	9	9^{+2}	7	6^{+9}	Ret	7^{+3}	1	Ret^{+5}	2	1^{+7}	Ret	1^{+10}	1	7^{+1}	5	8	8	2^{+9}	2	5	3	DNS	DNS	6^{+10}	1	18^{+6}	DNS	5^{+8}	7	11	12	577
6	74	(Netherlands) Kay de Wolf	Husqvarna	6^{+5}	10	1^{+9}	2	2^{+9}	4	5^{+3}	4	3^{+5}	2	4^{+7}	4	4^{+10}	5	1^{+10}	1	11	10	9^{+5}	9	4^{+4}	8	3^{+6}	4	Ret^{+5}	DNS									9	4	6^{+5}	2	573
7	24	(Norway) Kevin Horgmo	Kawasaki	9^{+2}	2	7^{+6}	9	9	7	11^{+2}	8	12	6	8^{+3}	7	6^{+1}	9	6	5	DNS	DNS	7^{+6}	5	9	10	2^{+3}	9	7^{+4}	6	4^{+2}	7	4^{+10}	19	5^{+1}	4	6^{+5}	1	6^{+6}	6	10	8	565
8	39	(Netherlands) Roan van de Moosdijk	Husqvarna	4^{+4}	7	8^{+2}	5	1^{+7}	8	6^{+5}	6	4^{+6}	3	10^{+4}	8	5^{+5}	7	3^{+9}	3	5^{+10}	5	8	6	3^{+9}	6	9^{+4}	Ret							8^{+3}	8	4^{+8}	3	10^{+4}	Ret	5^{+7}	7	560
9	198	(France) Thibault Benistant	Yamaha	2^{+6}	8	4^{+7}	3	4^{+10}	1	4^{+9}	5	13^{+3}	8	3^{+5}	5	1^{+9}	2	2^{+8}	6	4^{+6}	3	6^{+9}	4	8^{+3}	9	DNS	DNS	DNS	DNS									7^{+1}	5	2^{+3}	6	533
10	44	(Netherlands) Rick Elzinga	Yamaha	7^{+1}	4	Ret^{+1}	DNS	11^{+2}	11	12^{+1}	11	7	9	13	10					18^{+2}	11	12^{+2}	13	13^{+5}	11	10	13	9^{+3}	5	7^{+6}	5	3^{+6}	5	9^{+7}	Ret	7	8	8^{+5}	14	9	16	394
11	253	(Slovenia) Jan Pancar	KTM	10	12	12	10	10^{+3}	9	13	10	6^{+4}	10	16^{+2}	9	16	11	13	18	6^{+3}	6	10	8	10	7	15	16	21	23	12	10	12	10	Ret	12	13	10	11	Ret	15	10	348
12	51	(Spain) Oriol Oliver	KTM			10	11	13	15	15	Ret	17	16	11	12	13	14	9^{+4}	9	7^{+4}	14					14	12	8	10	6^{+4}	9	15^{+4}	13	11^{+5}	10	9	7	33	11	12	15	303
13	122	(South Africa) Camden McLellan	Honda	DNS	DNS											23	12	11^{+1}	11	14	12	15^{+3}	11	11	13	6^{+2}	5	13	14	10^{+3}	16	9^{+1}	4	7	7	14^{+1}	12	13	9	8	13	267
14	79	(Belgium) Sacha Coenen	KTM									16	15	9	11	DNS	DNS	10	13	10^{+1}	13	11^{+1}	12	12^{+2}	12	5	7	10	Ret	9^{+9}	6	5	8	DNS	DNS	12	16	15	15	17^{+6}	17	258
15	125	(Finland) Emil Weckman	Honda	14	11	11	12	12	10	8	Ret	10	12	15	19	DNS	DNS					14	15	14	14	7	15	15	12	Ret^{+1}	12	6^{+2}	9	13^{+2}	11	11^{+2}	9	16^{+2}	DNS	19	DNS	251
16	517	(Sweden) Isak Gifting	Gas Gas							16	12	14	DNS	18	13	10	17	7	10	12	8					12^{+7}	14	11^{+2}	8	Ret	8	7^{+3}	7	10	9	5^{+4}	17	17^{+3}	13	Ret	DNS	248
17	22	(Spain) David Braceras	Kawasaki	12	Ret	17	16	15^{+1}	13	17	17	11	14	14	14	14	Ret									16	11	12	7	8	15	8^{+5}	6	12	Ret	8^{+3}	11	14	8	DNS	DNS	224
18	11	(Denmark) Mikkel Haarup	Kawasaki	DNS	6																																					170
18	11	(Denmark) Mikkel Haarup	KTM					17^{+4}	14	10	13	8	13	12	15	9^{+4}	Ret	8^{+6}	7	8^{+5}	4	DNS	DNS																			170
19	12	(United States) Jack Chambers	Kawasaki					14	12	Ret	Ret	24^{+1}	Ret	17	16	12	Ret	Ret^{+2}	14	DNS	DNS																	19	12	16^{+1}	11	71
20	338	(Sweden) Filip Olsson	Husqvarna			13	Ret	22	Ret	22	18					Ret	DNS	15	Ret							21	Ret	Ret	16	13	14	19	12	16	17							57
21	505	(Sweden) Arvid Lüning	Gas Gas			19	15	28	25	21	22					25	18	17	17	20	23							Ret	28	14	20	13	14	17	16			24	25	20	21	53
22	401	(Austria) Marcel Stauffer	KTM							14	Ret									9	9					11	10															52
23	73	(Italy) Ferruccio Zanchi	KTM													11^{+2}	8									Ret^{+1}	17	14	11													47
24	696	(Switzerland) Mike Gwerder	KTM					25	24	25	20	18	Ret	Ret	20	20	13	12	12	16	15					19	Ret	DNS	DNS													45
25	261	(Estonia) Jörgen-Matthias Talviku	Husqvarna																									16	17	11	11									14	14	43
26	67	(Spain) Yago Martínez	KTM	11	15	14	19	16	19	26	16	Ret	Ret	23	Ret			16	Ret	Ret	DNS																					42
27	18	(Denmark) William Kleemann	KTM			20	20	24	23	23	23	23	20	25	23			Ret	DNS	25	26					24	23	28	18	18	17	14	15	19	13			28	17	26	22	40
28	132	(Italy) Andrea Bonacorsi	Yamaha																									6	Ret											13	9	39
29	17	(Norway) Cornelius Tøndel	KTM	Ret	16	16	14	18	17	18	Ret	15	Ret	22	18																											36
30	123	(Italy) Federico Tuani	KTM													15	15									Ret	Ret	18	25							15	13	20	16	Ret	DNS	35
31	64	(Italy) Lorenzo Ciabatti	KTM			Ret	13	21	20	Ret	19	Ret	21	DNS	DNS			18	16	22	20					Ret	DNS					16	16	Ret	18							35
31	64	(Italy) Lorenzo Ciabatti	Yamaha																																			21	22	Ret	19	35
32	282	(France) Marc-Antoine Rossi	KTM													8^{+6}	6									DNS	DNS															34
33	325	(Indonesia) Delvintor Alfarizi	Honda					DNS	DNS											28	25	17	16	16	15	29	DSQ	Ret	27	19	22	18	18	25	24	DNS	DNS					28
34	912	(United Kingdom) Joel Rizzi	Yamaha			15	17																																			27
34	912	(United Kingdom) Joel Rizzi	Honda							19	14	21	Ret	24	DNS																											27
34	912	(United Kingdom) Joel Rizzi	Gas Gas																									20	15					Ret	20							27
35	100	(France) Scotty Verhaeghe	Gas Gas																			13	14	15	16	23	Ret															26
36	770	(United States) Devin Simonson	KTM															14	15	23	18	16	17																			25
37	579	(United Kingdom) Bobby Bruce	Gas Gas					Ret	22	20	15	19	17	Ret	21	17	Ret			15	Ret																					23
38	313	(Czech Republic) Petr Polák	Yamaha					19	18	Ret	21					19	16			17	16					20	Ret	27	20													23
39	533	(Italy) Valerio Lata	KTM																																			12	10			20
40	14	(Sweden) Tim Edberg	Husqvarna																													11	11									20
41	27	(France) Tom Guyon	Fantic	16	14	DNS	DNS	DNS	DNS					19	17	DNS	DNS																									18
42	23	(United Kingdom) Taylor Hammal	KTM									20	19	21	22	21	Ret			21	Ret					18	Ret	26	21					23	15					18	18	18
43	432	(Netherlands) Ivano van Erp	Yamaha																									17^{+1}	9													17
44	408	(Netherlands) Scott Smulders	Honda																	Ret	19							24	Ret					14	14			30	21	21	25	16
45	207	(France) Xavier Cazal	Gas Gas																									25	22	15	13											14
46	180	(Sweden) Leopold Ambjörnsson	Husqvarna	13	25	18	18	Ret	DNS																																	14
47	777	(Thailand) Jiraj Wannalak	KTM																			18	19	17	17																	13
48	183	(Slovenia) Jaka Peklaj	Husqvarna																																	16	14	32	Ret			12
49	470	(Germany) Peter König	KTM																	19	17													15	Ret							12
50	319	(France) Quentin Prugnières	Kawasaki													Ret	10																									11
51	40	(Iran) Alireza Ahmadi	Honda																																	17	15					10
52	249	(Argentina) Tomás Moyano	Kawasaki	15	17																																					10
53	174	(Italy) Alessandro Valeri	KTM																							27	21	30	26			17	17	21	22			25	20			9
54	42	(Finland) Sampo Rainio	KTM																											16	18											8
55	164	(Indonesia) Diva Ismayana	Kawasaki																			Ret	18	19	18																	8
56	532	(Indonesia) Nakami Vidi Makarim	KTM																			20	20	18	19																	7
57	524	(Finland) Miro Varjonen	Husqvarna																											17	19											6
58	744	(France) Saad Soulimani	KTM													18	19																									5
58	744	(France) Saad Soulimani	Yamaha																	Ret	Ret					Ret	22	22	Ret													5
59	521	(Netherlands) Boris Blanken	Fantic																															18	19					25	26	5
60	120	(Uruguay) Franco Iavecchia	Husqvarna	18	19																																					5
61	112	(Ecuador) Pedro Suárez	Husqvarna	17	Ret																																					4
62	365	(Spain) Adriá Monné	KTM									22	18	20	Ret																											4
63	511	(Germany) Jan Krug	Husqvarna					23	21	24	25									24	22							19	19					22	21							4
64	188	(Lithuania) Erlandas Mackonis	KTM															19	19																							4
65	56	(Italy) Lorenzo Corti	Husqvarna					Ret	Ret	27	24					27	23	20	20	27	24																	29	19	23	24	4
66	177	(Italy) Alessandro Manucci	Gas Gas																							25	Ret											18	28			3
67	95	(Argentina) Maximo Caceres	Gas Gas	26	18																																					3
68	437	(Czech Republic) Martin Venhoda	Gas Gas																							30	18															3
69	210	(Italy) Matteo Puccinelli	Honda																																			31	18			3
70	333	(Malaysia) Hassan Mohamad Zubir	Husqvarna																			19	21																			2
71	50	(Czech Republic) Daniel Mandys	Yamaha																							22	19															2
72	81	(Argentina) Fermín Ciccimarra	Yamaha	19	Ret																																					2
73	596	(Finland) Eliel Lehtinen	KTM																											20	21											1
74	285	(United Kingdom) Calum Mitchell	Husqvarna																																					22	20	1
75	446	(France) Adrien Petit	Yamaha													24	20											29	24													1
76	256	(Denmark) Magnus Smith	Yamaha																							26	20															1
77	191	(Argentina) Juan Ignacio Salgado	Honda	20	26																																					1
78	817	(Netherlands) Raf Meuwissen	Yamaha					27	Ret	DNS	DNS																															1
78	817	(Netherlands) Raf Meuwissen	KTM																															20	DNS					Ret	DNS	1
79	299	(Chile) Jeremías Schiele	Gas Gas	Ret	20																																					1
80	254	(Portugal) Alexandre Marques	Husqvarna					20	Ret			Ret	DNS																													1
	31	(Italy) Francesco Bassi	KTM							Ret	Ret					22	22			Ret	21																	22	27			0
	288	(Argentina) Ignacio Liprandi	KTM	21	22																																					0
	88	(Ecuador) Italo Medina	Honda	23	21																																					0
	234	(France) Bogdan Krajewski	KTM													26	21																									0
	244	(Argentina) Andrés Sánchez	Kawasaki	22	24																																					0
	715	(Netherlands) Jaap Janssen	KTM																															24	23							0
	49	(Italy) Mattia Dusi	KTM																																			23	24			0
	106	(New Zealand) James Scott	Yamaha																																					24	23	0
	90	(Ecuador) Andrés Feicán	Honda	25	23																																					0
	669	(Italy) Luca Ruffini	KTM																																			27	23			0
	312	(Norway) Håkon Østerhagen	Fantic																									23	Ret	Ret	Ret											0
	301	(France) Noah Vampa	Yamaha					26	27							28	24																									0
	199	(Slovakia) Jaroslav Katriňák	KTM																							28	24															0
	225	(Paraguay) Thiago Hiebert	Honda	24	Ret																																					0
	421	(Italy) Eugenio Barbaglia	Husqvarna																																			26	26			0
	153	(Switzerland) Flavio Wolf	Kawasaki					Ret	26																																	0
	882	(United Kingdom) Charlie Cole	Kawasaki																	26	DNS																					0
	148	(Italy) Tommaso Lodi	Kawasaki																																			34	Ret			0
	111	(Netherlands) Romano Aspers	KTM																															Ret	Ret							0
	931	(San Marino) Andrea Zanotti	Kawasaki							Ret	DNS																															0
	931	(San Marino) Andrea Zanotti	Husqvarna																																			DNS	DNS			0
	651	(Estonia) Meico Vettik	TM																									Ret	DNS													0
	661	(Belgium) Pako Destercq	Yamaha																																			Ret	DNS			0
	255	(Malaysia) Muhammad Hakimi Iroly	Kawasaki																					DNS	DNS																	0
	317	(Indonesia) Nuzul Ramzidan	Honda																			DNS	DNS																			0
	913	(France) Enzo Dubois	Honda													DNS	DNS																									0
	201	(Switzerland) Luca Diserens	Honda					DNS	DNS																																	0
	154	(Bolivia) Carlos Andrés Padilla	KTM	DNS	DNS																																					0
	219	(Ecuador) Kayl Delgado	Gas Gas	DNS	DNS																																					0
Pos	Nr	Rider	Bike	ARG (Argentina)		SAR (Sardinia)		SUI (Switzerland)		TRE		POR (Portugal)		ESP (Spain)		FRA (France)		LAT (Latvia)		GER (Germany)		SUM (West Nusa Tenggara)		LOM (West Nusa Tenggara)		CZE (Czech Republic)		FLA (Flanders)		FIN (Finland)		SWE (Sweden)		NED (Netherlands)		TUR (Turkey)		ITA (Italy)		GBR (United Kingdom)		Points

==== Manufacturers Championship ====
Pos	Bike	ARG (Argentina)		SAR (Sardinia)		SUI (Switzerland)		TRE		POR (Portugal)		ESP (Spain)		FRA (France)		LAT (Latvia)		GER (Germany)		SUM (West Nusa Tenggara)		LOM (West Nusa Tenggara)		CZE (Czech Republic)		FLA (Flanders)		FIN (Finland)		SWE (Sweden)		NED (Netherlands)		TUR (Turkey)		ITA (Italy)		GBR (United Kingdom)		Points
1	Yamaha	1^{+10}	1	2^{+10}	1	4^{+10}	1	1^{+9}	5	1^{+10}	1	2^{+10}	2	1^{+9}	2	2^{+8}	6	4^{+6}	3	5^{+9}	3	1^{+10}	1	1^{+5}	3	1^{+10}	1	7^{+8}	5	3^{+6}	5	4^{+7}	3	2^{+7}	4	2^{+9}	1	2^{+8}	1	977
2	KTM	3^{+9}	3	5^{+5}	6	3^{+6}	2	2^{+8}	2	2^{+8}	5	5^{+6}	3	2^{+8}	3	4^{+7}	4	2^{+9}	1	2^{+8}	2	2^{+7}	3	5^{+10}	1	4^{+7}	4	1^{+9}	1	2^{+9}	1	2^{+8}	2	3^{+9}	2	3^{+7}	3	4^{+9}	3	929
3	Husqvarna	4^{+5}	7	1^{+9}	2	1^{+9}	4	5^{+5}	4	3^{+6}	2	4^{+9}	4	4^{+10}	1	1^{+10}	1	1^{+10}	5	1^{+10}	1	3^{+9}	5	3^{+6}	4	2^{+9}	2	5	3	11	11	6^{+10}	1	4^{+8}	3	5^{+8}	4	5^{+7}	2	882
4	Gas Gas	8^{+8}	5	3^{+8}	7	5	5	9^{+10}	1	5^{+9}	4	1^{+8}	1	10	17	7	10	12	8	4^{+7}	10	5^{+8}	2	4^{+9}	2	3^{+8}	3	2^{+10}	2	1^{+7}	2	1^{+9}	6	1^{+10}	6	1^{+10}	2	1^{+10}	4	817
5	Kawasaki	9^{+2}	2	7^{+6}	9	9^{+1}	7	11^{+2}	8	11^{+1}	6	8^{+3}	7	6^{+1}	9	6^{+2}	5	26	DNS	7^{+6}	5	9	10	2^{+3}	9	7^{+4}	6	4^{+2}	7	4^{+10}	6	5^{+1}	4	6^{+5}	1	6^{+6}	6	10^{+1}	8	584
6	Honda	14	11	11	12	12	10	8	14	10	12	15	19	23	12	11^{+1}	11	14	12	14^{+3}	11	11	13	6^{+2}	5	13	12	10^{+3}	12	6^{+2}	4	7^{+2}	7	11^{+2}	9	13^{+2}	9	8	13	393
7	Fantic	16	14	DNS	DNS	DNS	DNS					19	17	DNS	DNS											23	Ret	Ret	Ret			18	19					25	26	23
	TM																									Ret	DNS													0
Pos	Bike	ARG (Argentina)		SAR (Sardinia)		SUI (Switzerland)		TRE		POR (Portugal)		ESP (Spain)		FRA (France)		LAT (Latvia)		GER (Germany)		SUM (West Nusa Tenggara)		LOM (West Nusa Tenggara)		CZE (Czech Republic)		FLA (Flanders)		FIN (Finland)		SWE (Sweden)		NED (Netherlands)		TUR (Turkey)		ITA (Italy)		GBR (United Kingdom)		Points

== See also ==
- 2023 FIM Supercross World Championship
- 2023 FIM Women's Motocross World Championship
- 2023 European Motocross Championship
- 2023 Motocross des Nations
