= Cempi Bay =

Bay in Indonesia

Coordinates: 8.84°S 118.34°E

Cempi Bay (Indonesian: Teluk Cempi) or Cempi Gulf is a bay in West Nusa Tenggara which borders the southern part of Dompu Regency of Sumbawa island facing the Indian Ocean. It is notable for having a surfing enthusiast spots of Hu'u and Lakey Beach.
