= Utan =

Utan may refer to:

- Sinabawang gulay, a Filipino vegetable soup
- Utan, a district in West Nusa Tenggara, Indonesia
