= Woja =

- District
- Interactive map of Woja
- Coordinates: 8°32′50″S 118°25′44″E
- Country: Indonesia
- Province: West Nusa Tenggara
- Regency: Dompu

Area
  - Total: 304.09 km^{2} (117.41 sq mi)

Population (mid 2025 estimate)
  - Total: 61,441
  - Density: 202.05/km^{2} (523.30/sq mi)

Woja is an administrative district (kecamatan) in Dompu Regency, West Nusa Tenggara, Indonesia. Its 3 urban villages (kelurahan) of Simpasai (which had 8,601 inhabitants in 2024), Kandai II (8,448 inhabitants) and Montabaru (5,891 inhabitants), with a combined area of 15.85 km^{2}, are part of the Dompu urban area.
