= Pekat =

- District
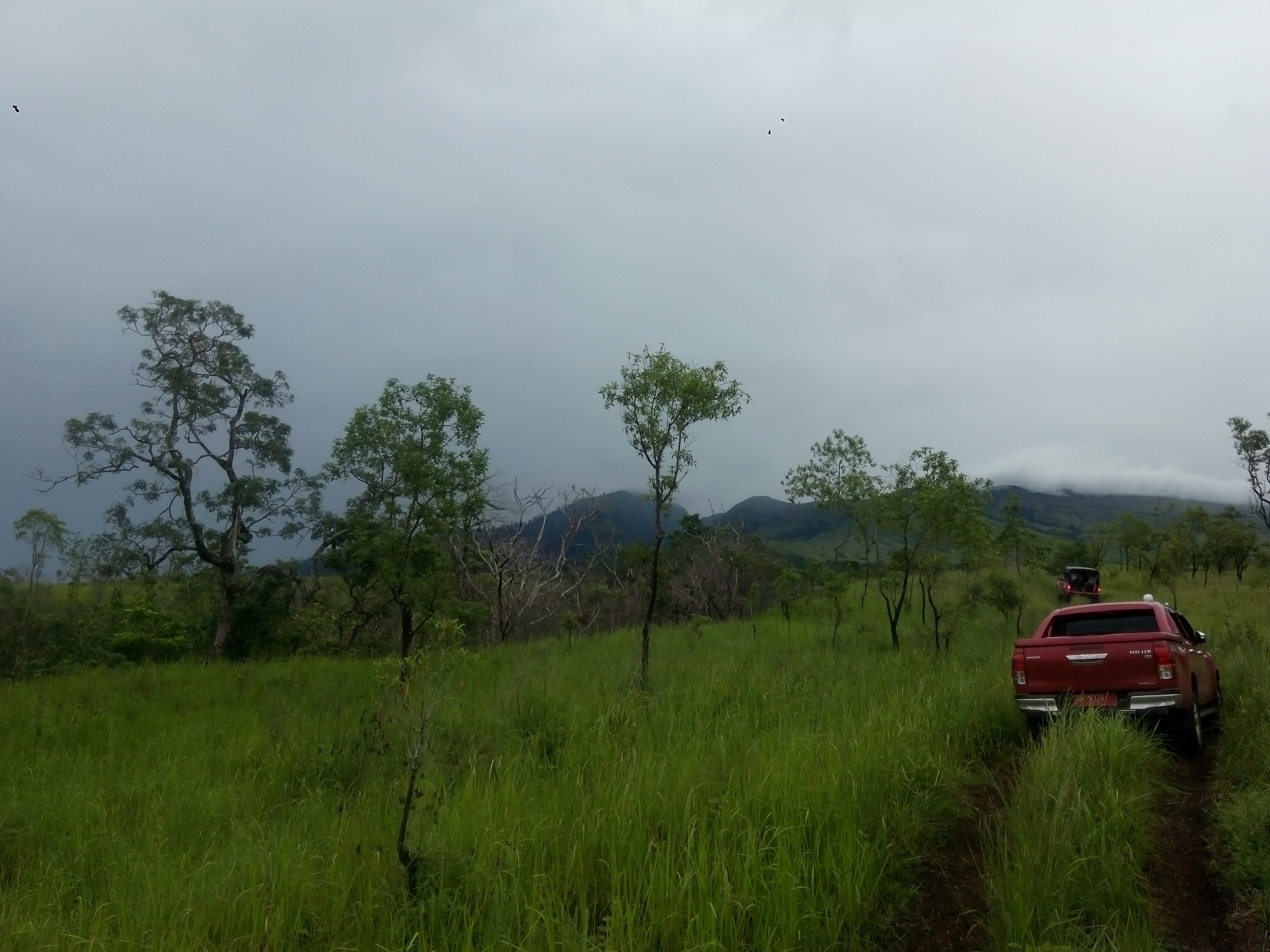
- Interactive map of Pekat
- Coordinates: 8°30′27″S 117°25′39″E
- Country: Indonesia
- Province: West Nusa Tenggara
- Regency: Dompu

Pekat is a district in Dompu Regency, West Nusa Tenggara, Indonesia.
