= Sumbawa Besar =

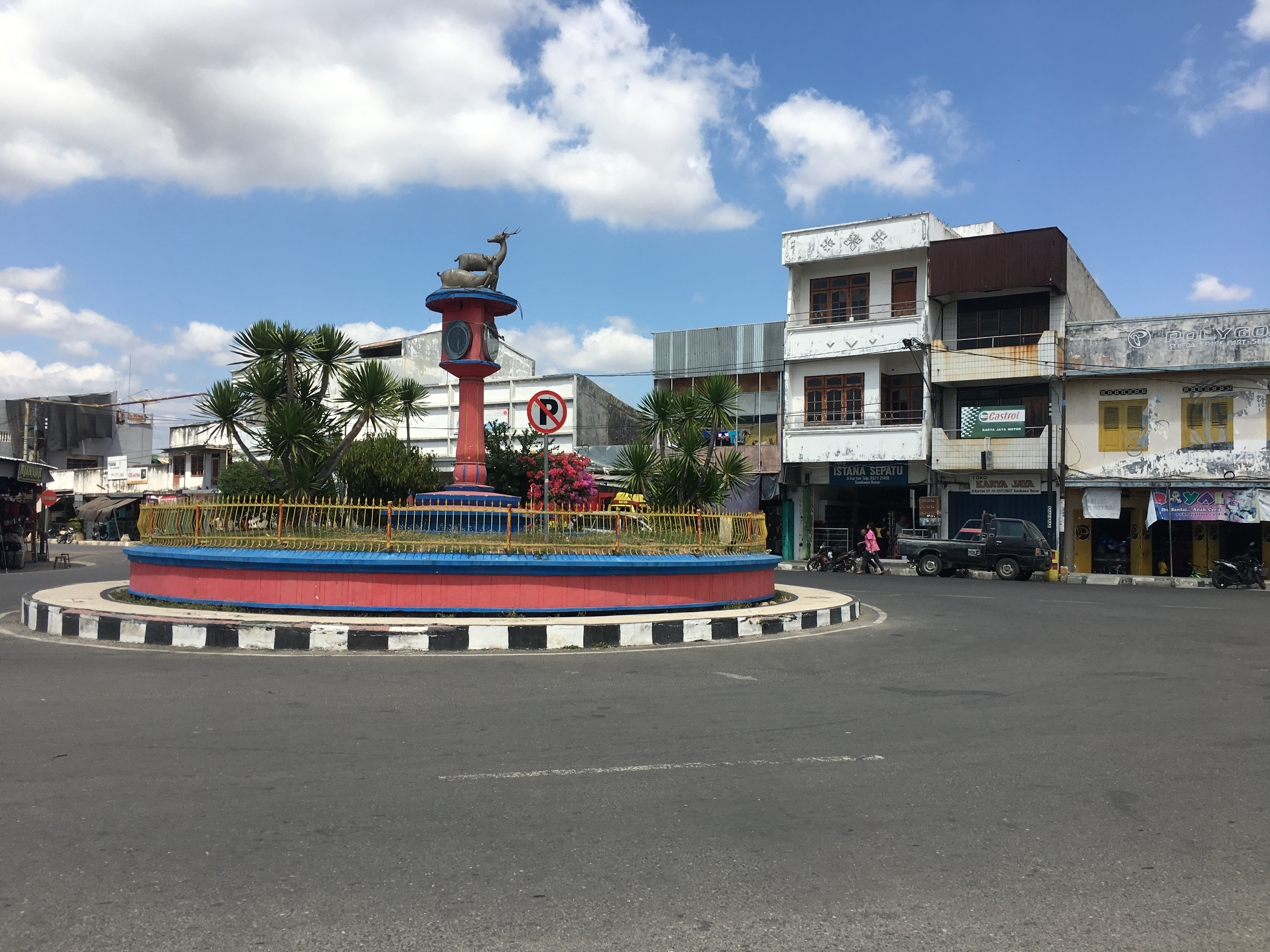
- Downtown Sumbawa Besar
- Motto: BESAR
- Location of Sumbawa Regency in West Nusa Tenggara

- Location in Indonesia
- Country: Indonesia
- Region: Lesser Sunda Islands
- Province: West Nusa Tenggara
- Regency: Sumbawa

Area
  - Total: 44.83 km^{2} (17.31 sq mi)

Population (mid 2024 estimate)
  - Total: 64,936
  - Density: 1,448/km^{2} (3,752/sq mi)
- Time zone: UTC+8

Sumbawa Besar is a town and an administrative district (kecamatan), officially just called "Sumbawa", on the Indonesian island of Sumbawa, and is the second-biggest settlement on the island after the city of Bima. It is the administrative capital of the Sumbawa Regency within the province of West Nusa Tenggara, and has a population of 56,337 inhabitants as of the 2010 census and 62,753 at the 2020 Census; the official estimate as at mid 2024 was 64,936.

== Name ==
The slogan of Sumbawa Besar is BESAR, meaning "big" in Indonesian. However, this slogan has also been used an acronym for:

- B: Bersih ("Clean")
- E: Elok ("Beautiful")
- S: Sehat ("Healthy")
- A: Aman ("Safe")
- R: Rapi ("Proper")

== Communities ==
Sumbawa District comprises eight urban villages (kelurahan), listed below with their areas and their populations as officially estimated for mid 2024, together with their post codes.

Kode Wilayah	Name of kelurahan	Area in km^{2}	Pop'n Estimate mid 2024	Post Code
52.04.08.1006	Lempeh	6.55	5,472	84312
52.04.08.1001	Samapuin	11.08	5,271	84316
52.04.08.1002	Brang Bara	2.40	7,294	84314
52.04.08.1003	Pekat	2.30	5,444	84315
52.04.08.1004	Seketeng	8.00	12,344	84311
52.04.08.1005	Bugis	2.00	7,450	84313
52.04.08.1008	Uma Sima	6.76	7,046	84317
52.04.08.1007	Brang Biji	10.50	14,615	84318
52.04.08	Totals	44.83	64,936	

== Languages ==
Indonesian is widely spoken in Sumbawa Besar, with some local languages such as Sumbawa. Several people can also speak Balinese.

== Transportation ==
Public transportation in Sumbawa Besar may include bemo, dokar (a traditional horse-drawn vehicle), and becak.

There is one airport, Sultan Muhammad Kaharuddin III Airport (formerly Bandar Udara Brangbiji), serving small flights to and from Mataram, Lombok.

Labuhan Sumbawa, the harbour of Sumbawa Besar is of minor importance (it had 14,878 inhabitants as at mid 2024, and is administratively a village in the adjoining Labuhan Badas District, west of the town district). However, Poto Tano (id), the most important harbour of Sumbawa, is 90 kilometres (56 mi) to the west in West Sumbawa Regency; there is a ferry service from here (Labuhan Tano) to Labuhan Lombok across the Alas Strait.

There is no railway on Sumbawa.

== Tourism and sights ==
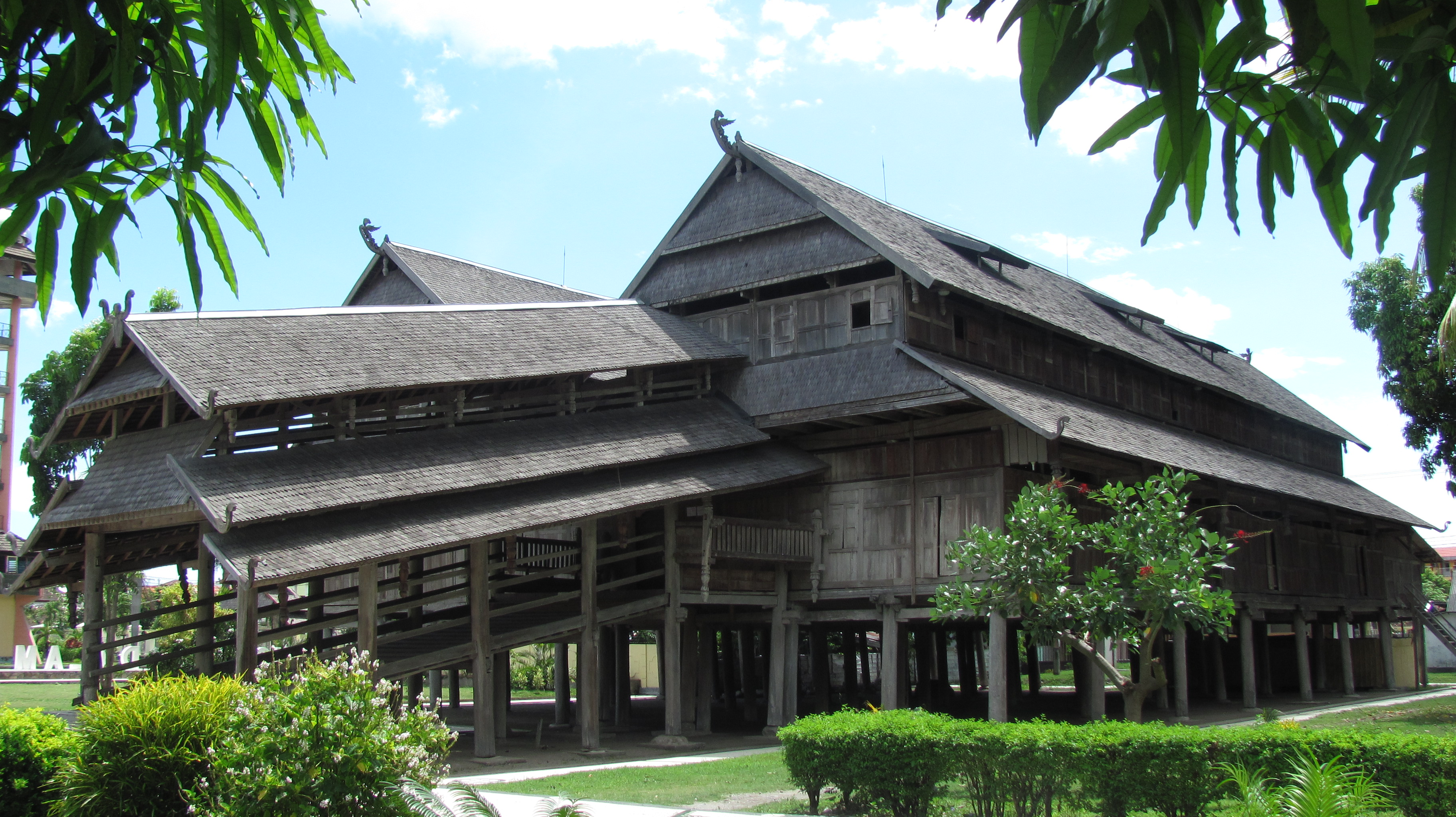
The Isatana Dalam Loka, former residence of the Sultan of Sumbawa

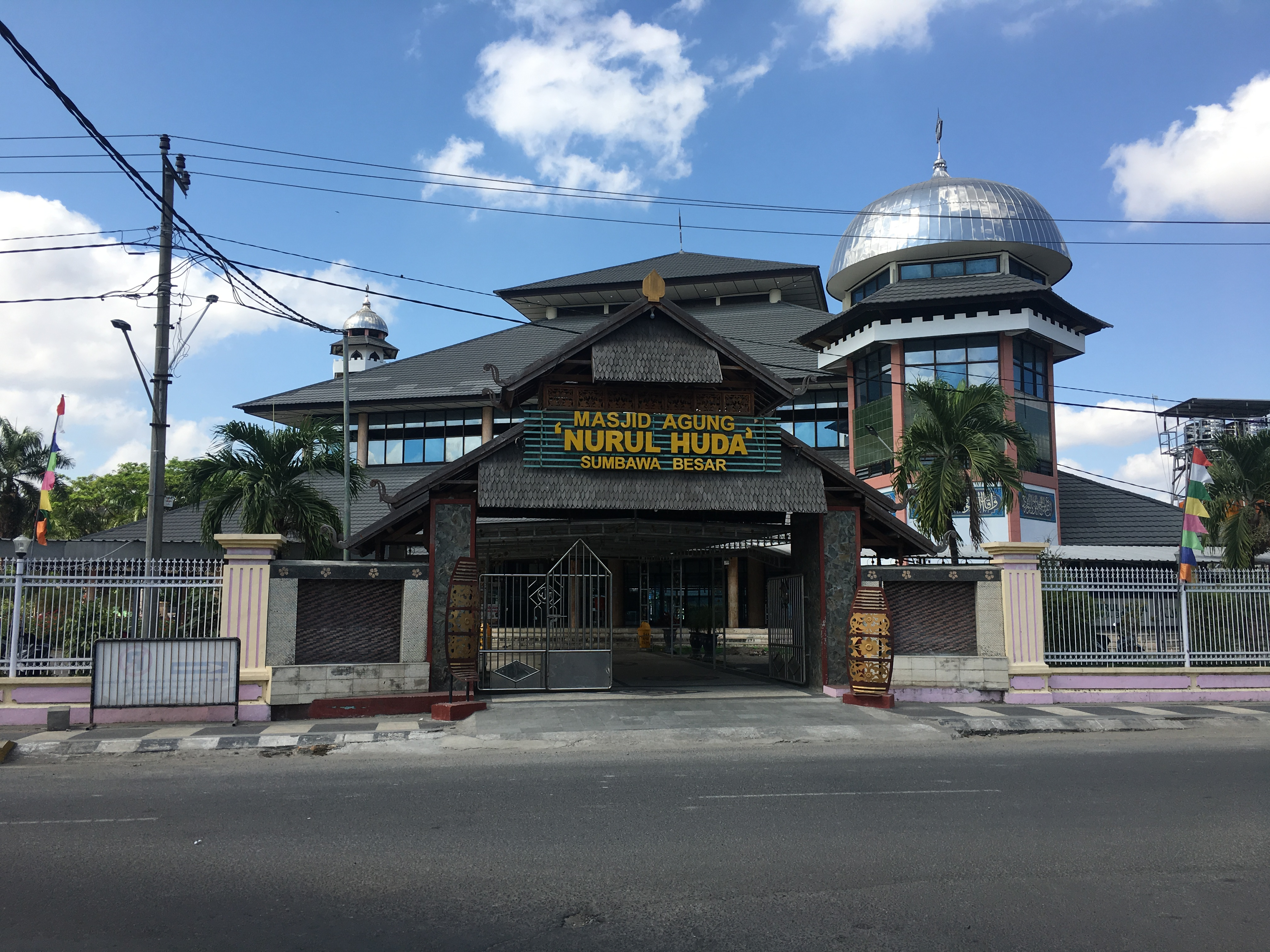
The Great Mosque of Sumbawa Besar

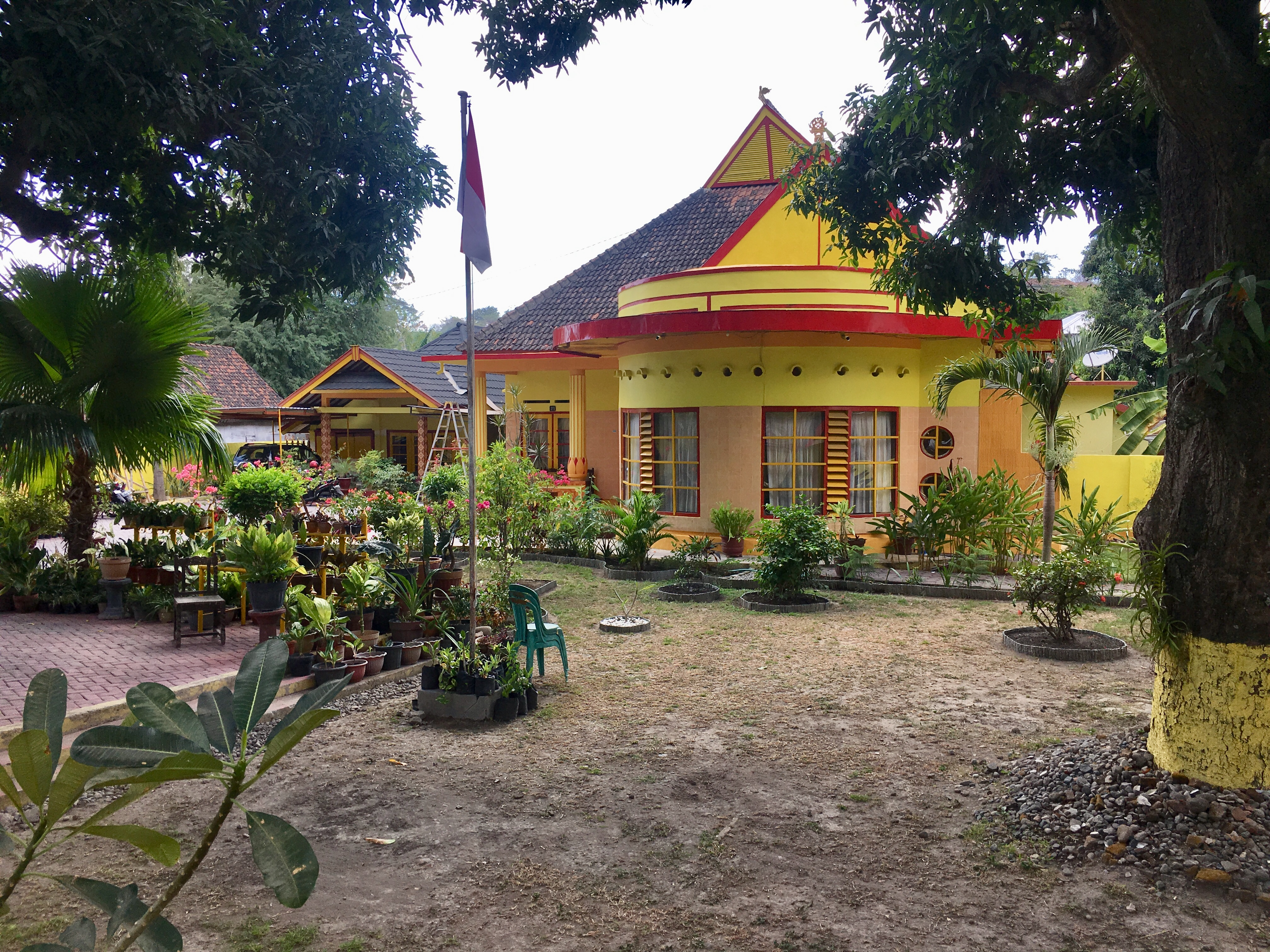
The Dutch colonial era Balai Kuning

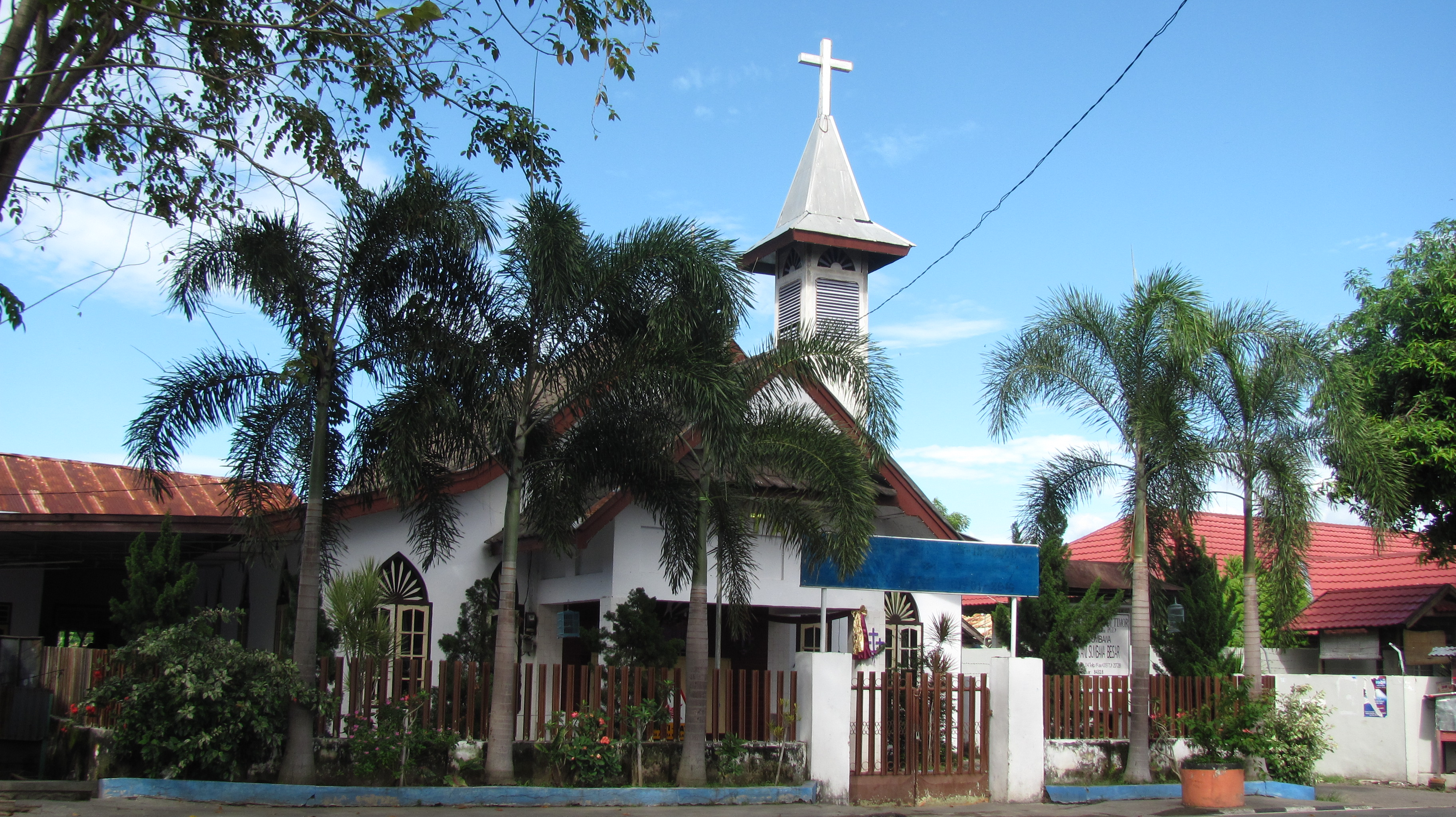
The Dutch Reformed Church

Sumbawa Besar has a few historic buildings from the Dutch colonial period.

The former palace of the sultan, the Istana Dalam Loka, was built in 1885 with 99 columns, and without the use of a single nail; well-known Sultan Jalaludin III reigned in the area from 1883-1893. The palace, renovated in the 1980s, is today used for various cultural events.

The largest mosque in Sumbawa Besar, Masjid Agung Nurul Huda, was built beside the palace. The Dutch Reformed Church (Gereja Masehi Injili di Timor) of Sumbawa Besar was founded around 1900, and still holds services. A Balinese Hindu temple, Pura Agung Giri Gnatha, is nearby.

In 1932, the Dutch constructed the Balai Kuning, a tall administration building in a European half-timbered style. The foundation stone from 11 February 1932, with Dutch inscription, is still visible on the northern wall. The building houses various weapons and clothing used by previous sultans, and is surrounded by a park, with two canons dating from colonial times.

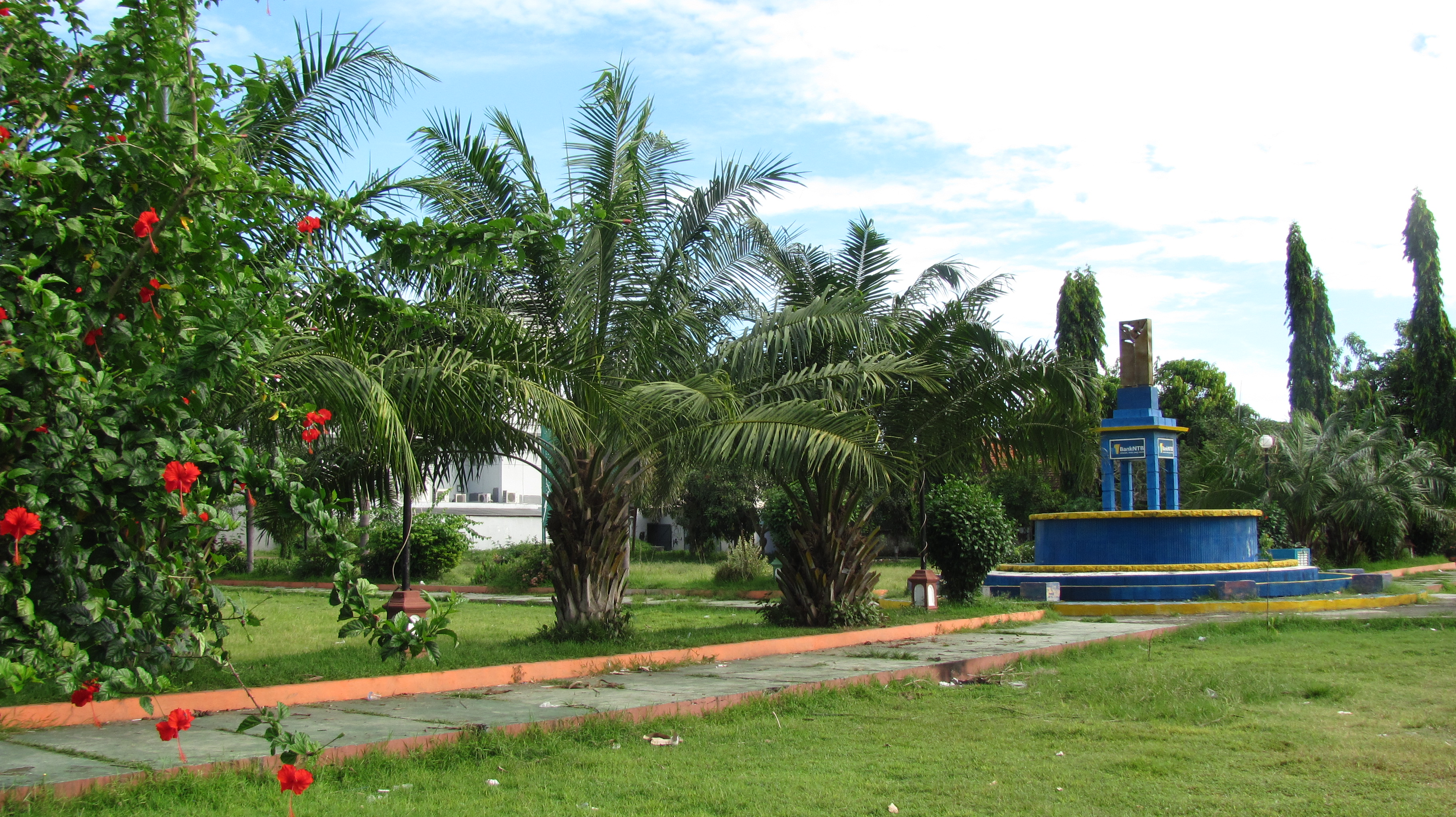
Taman Krato a park in Sumbawa Besar

Taman Krato is a park with avenues of palms and hibiscus on Jalan Merdeka, the street opposite the Balai Kuning.

The clock tower on the corner of Jalan Kartini and Jalan Sultan Hasanuddin is considered to be the middle of Sumbawa Besar.

== Education ==
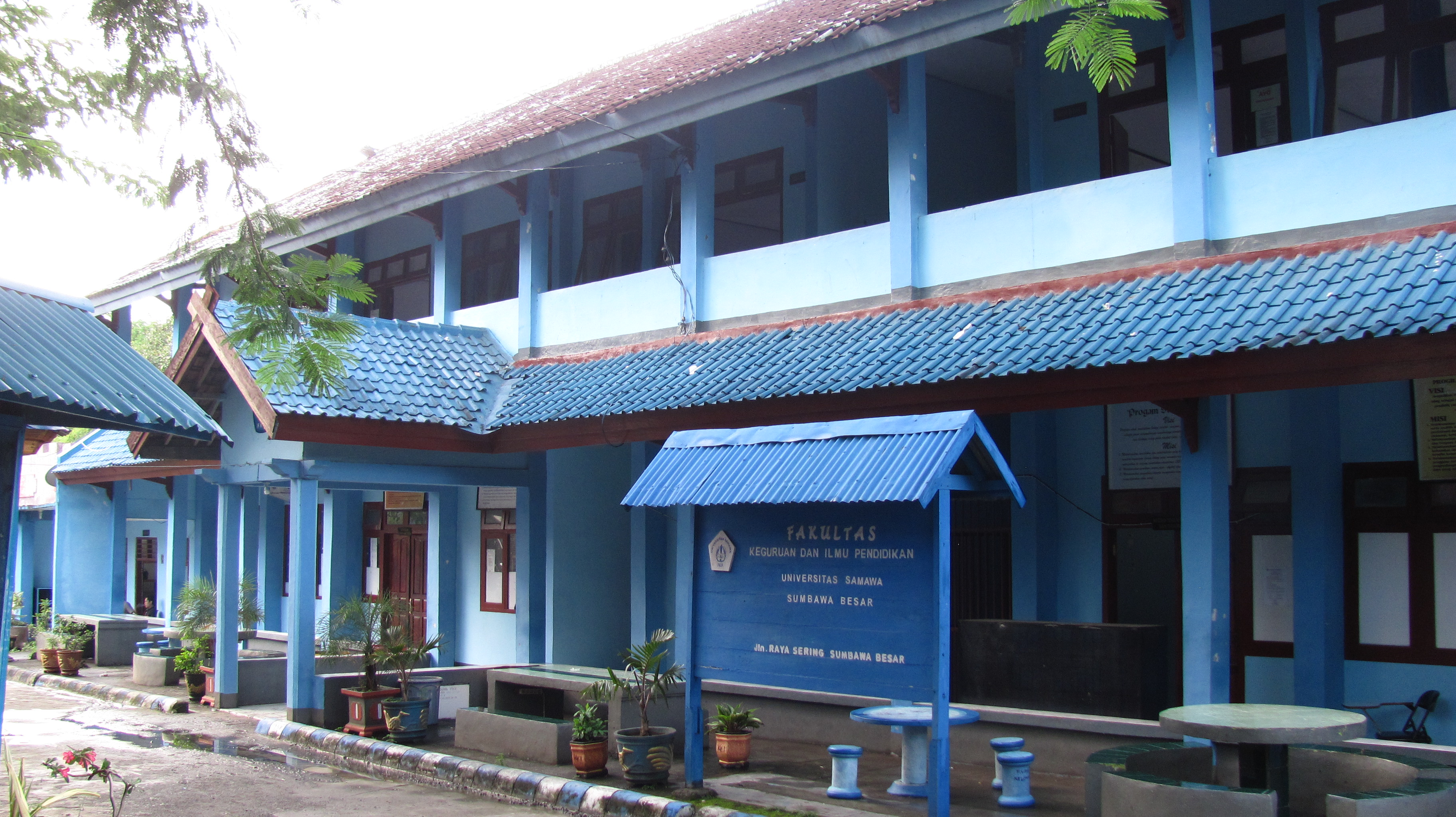
Samawa University

Sumbawa Besar has various public schools and one private Catholic school.

A university was founded in 1998, Universitas Samawa ("UNSA"; "Samawa University"), across the Brang Biji River to the west of the city centre. The study programs include Management Finance and Banking (D3), Mechanical Engineering (D3), Civil Engineering (D3 & S1), Physics, Agronomy, Administration, Economy, Food Science, and Education (S1).

== Climate ==
Sumbawa Besar has a tropical savanna climate (Köppen Aw) with moderate to little rainfall from May to October and heavy rainfall from November to April.

Climate data for Sumbawa Besar (1991–2020 normals)
Month	Jan	Feb	Mar	Apr	May	Jun	Jul	Aug	Sep	Oct	Nov	Dec	Year
Mean daily maximum °C (°F)	31.0 (87.8)	30.7 (87.3)	31.3 (88.3)	32.6 (90.7)	33.0 (91.4)	32.5 (90.5)	32.3 (90.1)	32.9 (91.2)	34.4 (93.9)	34.6 (94.3)	34.0 (93.2)	32.0 (89.6)	32.6 (90.7)
Daily mean °C (°F)	26.8 (80.2)	26.7 (80.1)	26.8 (80.2)	27.4 (81.3)	27.3 (81.1)	26.7 (80.1)	26.2 (79.2)	26.5 (79.7)	27.5 (81.5)	28.3 (82.9)	28.2 (82.8)	27.2 (81.0)	27.1 (80.8)
Mean daily minimum °C (°F)	23.7 (74.7)	23.5 (74.3)	23.5 (74.3)	23.5 (74.3)	23.2 (73.8)	22.4 (72.3)	21.2 (70.2)	21.1 (70.0)	22.2 (72.0)	23.3 (73.9)	24.0 (75.2)	23.9 (75.0)	23.0 (73.3)
Average rainfall mm (inches)	273.0 (10.75)	301.3 (11.86)	193.3 (7.61)	118.5 (4.67)	55.0 (2.17)	17.2 (0.68)	12.1 (0.48)	2.1 (0.08)	16.6 (0.65)	47.4 (1.87)	136.5 (5.37)	222.0 (8.74)	1,395 (54.93)
Average rainy days (≥ 1.0 mm)	16.4	16.0	12.8	9.3	4.1	1.7	1.1	0.3	1.0	3.3	9.7	14.6	90.3
Source: Starlings Roost Weather

== Surroundings ==
The village of Poto, about 12 kilometres (7.5 mi) east of Sumbawa Besar, is known for its traditional architecture and ikat weaving.

Air Beling, a waterfall with a height of 50 metres (160 ft), is near the village of Semamung, and is located in a forest previously used as royal hunting grounds.

Mount Tambora, an active stratovolcano whose 1815 eruption was one of the world’s most powerful, lies 40 kilometres (25 mi) to the northeast of Sumbawa Besar.

The Batu Bulan Dam was built from 1998–2003 with financial aid from Japan, and is used for the irrigation of 5,576 hectares of land.

== Culture ==
=== Regional Specialties ===
Sumbawa has several regional specialties, these include:

Food

- Sepat
- Gecok (Sumbawa)
- Singang
- Pelu lenga
- Rambarang

Cakes

- Manjareal
- Permen jadi
- Putri mandi
- Janda berenang
