= Kilo, Dompu =

Kilo
- District
- Interactive map of Kilo
- Coordinates: 8°20′36″S 118°24′48″E
- Country: Indonesia
- Province: West Nusa Tenggara
- Regency: Dompu

Kilo is a district in Dompu Regency, West Nusa Tenggara, Indonesia.
