= Ropang =

- District
- Interactive map of Ropang
- Coordinates: 8°54′42″S 117°29′49″E
- Country: Indonesia
- Province: West Nusa Tenggara
- Regency: Sumbawa
- Time zone: UTC+8 (WITA)

Ropang is a district in Sumbawa Regency, West Nusa Tenggara, Indonesia.

== Natural disasters ==
Ropang District is vulnerable to natural disasters, especially during the rainy season. This district has experienced flash floods and landslides several times due to high intensity rain.
