= Empang =

- District
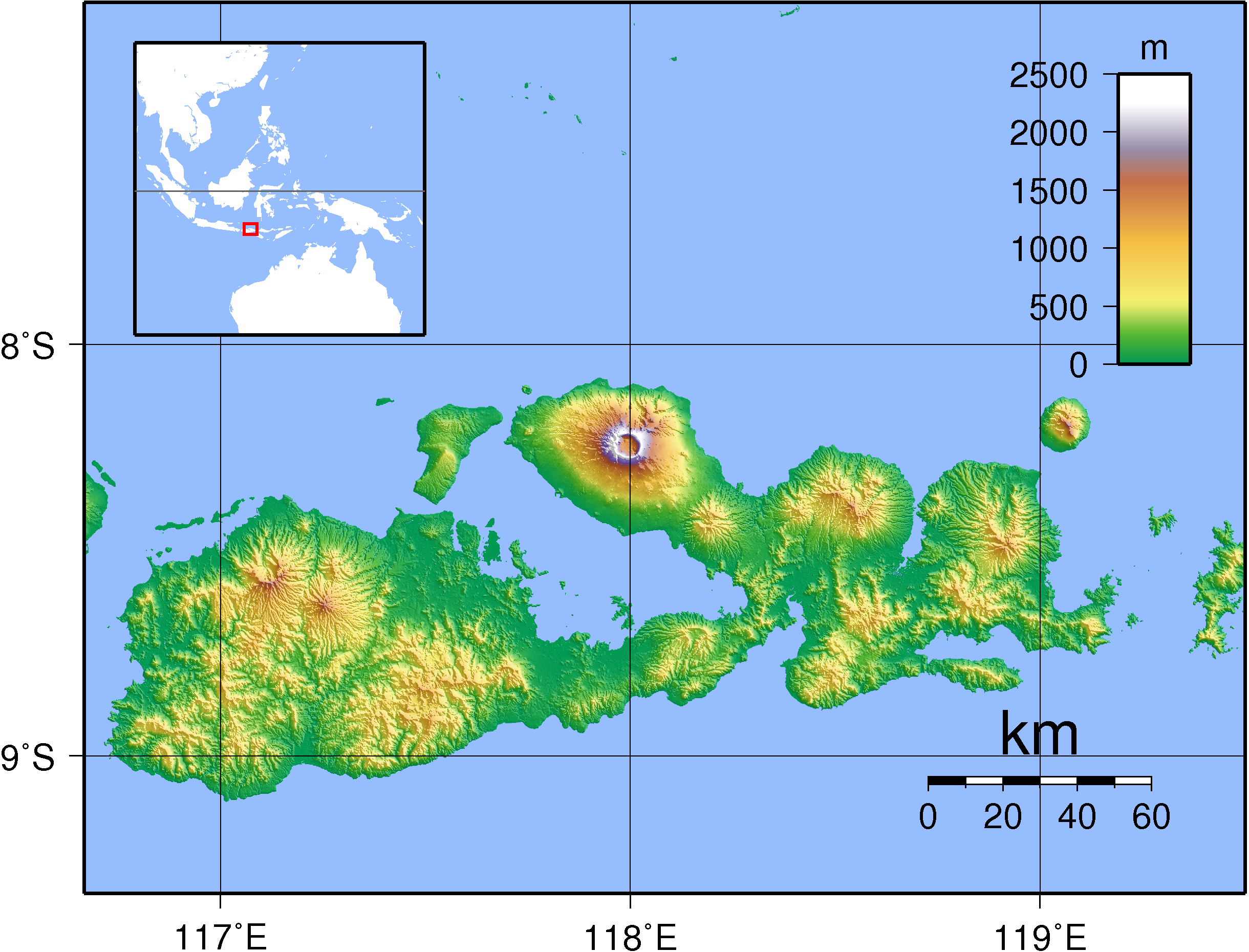
- Location on Sumbawa Island, Indonesia
- Coordinates: 8°46′01″S 118°00′13″E
- Country: Indonesia
- Province: West Nusa Tenggara
- Regency: Sumbawa

Area
  - Total: 558.55 km^{2} (215.66 sq mi)

Population (2017)
  - Total: 22,664
- Ministry of Home Affairs Code: 520807

Empang is one of the districts (kecamatan) in Sumbawa Regency, West Nusa Tenggara, Indonesia. Its area is 558.55 km². In 2017, the population was 22,664. In 2003, the eastern part of Empang District was divided into Tarano District.
