= Hu'u =

- District
- Interactive map of Hu'u
- Coordinates: 8°44′28″S 118°27′38″E
- Country: Indonesia
- Province: West Nusa Tenggara
- Regency: Dompu

Hu'u is a district in Dompu Regency, West Nusa Tenggara, Indonesia.
