= Dompu =

- Town
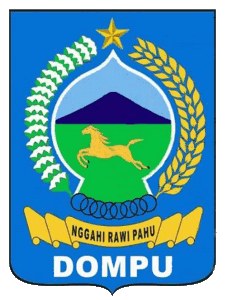
- Seal
- Motto: Nggahi Rawi Pahu (English: Prove Your Words)
- Location of Dompu Regency in West Nusa Tenggara

- Location in Indonesia
- Coordinates: 08°32′11″S 118°27′48″E
- Country: Indonesia
- Region: Lesser Sunda Islands
- Province: West Nusa Tenggara
- Regency: Dompu
- Established: 10 April 2002

Government
  - Mayor: Bambang M. Yasin

Area
  - Total: 172.85 km^{2} (66.74 sq mi)

Population (mid 2025 estimate)
  - Total: 59,250
  - Density: 342.8/km^{2} (887.8/sq mi)
- Time zone: UTC+8
- License plate: EA
- Website: www.dompukab.go.id

Dompu is a town and the administrative centre of the Dompu Regency, located in the eastern part of the island of Sumbawa, in central Indonesia's province of West Nusa Tenggara. It is the third largest town on the island of Sumbawa, with a district population of 49,854 at the 2010 Census, which by the 2020 Census had grown to 54,987; the official estimate as at mid 2025 was 59,250. It is connected by provincial roads to Bima and Sape to the east.

== Villages ==
The district comprises 15 villages - 6 urban kelurahan (listed first in the table) and 9 rural desa. These are tabulated below with their areas and their populations in mid 2024.

Kode Wilayah	Name of Village	Area in km^{2}	Pop'n mid 2024 Estimate	Post code
52.05.01.2010	Mbawi	28.81	3,730	84219
52.05.01.2011	Dorebara	8.55	4,398	84212
52.05.01.1006	Kandai I	8.32	5,265	84219
52.05.01.1004	Karijawa	1.06	4,184	84217
52.05.01.1003	Potu	0.27	3,779	84214
52.05.01.1001	Bada	1.79	5,274	84211
52.05.01.1002	Bali	6.74	5,267	84213
52.05.01.1005	Dorotangga	1.12	4,903	84219
52.05.01.2007	O'o	11.11	6,862	84219
52.05.01.2008	Katua	4.68	1,709	84219
52.05.01.2009	Karamabura	69.52	3,223	84219
52.05.01.2012	Kareke	7.77	3,199	84219
52.05.01.2013	Mangge Nae	14.89	1,972	84219
52.05.01.2014	Mangge Asi	3.91	4,031	84219
52.05.01.2015	Sorisakoto	4.31	3,621	84213

However, the western section of the Dompu urban area lies outside Dompu District in the adjoining Woja District; the three urban kelurahan of Woja District contiguous with Dompu (Montabaru, Kandai II and Simpasai) cover 15.85 km^{2} and in mid 2024 had a combined population of 22,940; their inclusion would see Dompu as the second-largest urban area on Sumbawa island. For completness, the eleven rural villages (desa) in Woja District are included in the table below.

Kode Wilayah	Name of Village	Area in km^{2}	Pop'n mid 2024 Estimate	Post code
52.05.05.2010	Riwo	71.62	2,414	84251
52.05.05.2009	Madaprama	21.45	3,822	84251
52.05.05.2008	Bara	19.03	4,787	84251
52.05.05.2007	Nowa	6.54	3,840	84251
52.05.05.2005	Wawonduru	5.02	4,480	84251
52.05.05.2006	Matua	6.28	5,753	84251
52.05.05.1001	Montabaru	2.67	5,891	84219
52.05.05.1002	Kandai II	4.09	8,448	84218
52.05.05.1003	Simpasai	9.09	8,601	84216
52.05.05.2004	Saneo	56.64	3,430	84251
52.05.05.2011	Mumbu	28.72	2,941	84251
52.05.05.2014	Bakajaya	4.24	5,229	84251
52.05.05.2013	Rababaka	61.85	1,533	84251
52.05.05.2012	Serakapi	5.59	2,140	84251

== History ==
Dompu (or Dompo) was once one of the four sultanates on the island of Sumbawa.

== Geography ==
The town is located in the middle part of eastern section of the Sumbawa island.

== Climate ==
Dompu has a tropical savanna climate (Köppen Aw) with moderate to little rainfall from May to October and heavy rainfall from November to April.

Climate data for Dompu
Month	Jan	Feb	Mar	Apr	May	Jun	Jul	Aug	Sep	Oct	Nov	Dec	Year
Mean daily maximum °C (°F)	30.1 (86.2)	29.7 (85.5)	30.6 (87.1)	30.9 (87.6)	30.3 (86.5)	29.9 (85.8)	29.9 (85.8)	30.5 (86.9)	31.1 (88.0)	31.3 (88.3)	30.7 (87.3)	30.0 (86.0)	30.4 (86.7)
Daily mean °C (°F)	25.5 (77.9)	25.4 (77.7)	26.0 (78.8)	25.9 (78.6)	25.1 (77.2)	24.5 (76.1)	24.0 (75.2)	24.2 (75.6)	24.9 (76.8)	25.7 (78.3)	26.0 (78.8)	25.6 (78.1)	25.2 (77.4)
Mean daily minimum °C (°F)	21.0 (69.8)	21.1 (70.0)	21.4 (70.5)	20.9 (69.6)	19.9 (67.8)	19.1 (66.4)	18.1 (64.6)	18.0 (64.4)	18.8 (65.8)	20.1 (68.2)	21.3 (70.3)	21.2 (70.2)	20.1 (68.1)
Average rainfall mm (inches)	199 (7.8)	179 (7.0)	201 (7.9)	129 (5.1)	40 (1.6)	44 (1.7)	30 (1.2)	7 (0.3)	21 (0.8)	61 (2.4)	131 (5.2)	251 (9.9)	1,293 (50.9)
Source: Climate-Data.org

== Administration ==
The town is divided into 16 communities (kelurahan).
