= Utan, Sumbawa =

Utan
- District
- Interactive map of Utan
- Coordinates: 8°24′43″S 117°08′11″E
- Country: Indonesia
- Province: West Nusa Tenggara
- Regency: Sumbawa
- Time zone: UTC+8 (WITA)
- Vehicle registration: EA

Utan is a district in Sumbawa Regency, West Nusa Tenggara, Indonesia.
