= Pajo, Dompu =

Pajo
- District
- Location of Dompu Regency in West Nusa Tenggara

- Location in Indonesia
- Country: Indonesia
- Region: Lesser Sunda Islands
- Province: West Nusa Tenggara
- Regency: Dompu

Area
  - Total: 135.32 km^{2} (52.25 sq mi)

Population (mid 2024 estimate)
  - Total: 16,061
  - Density: 118.69/km^{2} (307.40/sq mi)
- Time zone: UTC+8

Pajo is an administrative district (Indonesian: kecamatan) in the regency (Indonesian: kabupaten) of Dompu on Sumbawa Island, West Nusa Tenggara, Indonesia.
