= Sumbawa Regency =

Regency in West Nusa Tenggara, Indonesia

Sumbawa Regency Kabupaten Sumbawa
- Regency
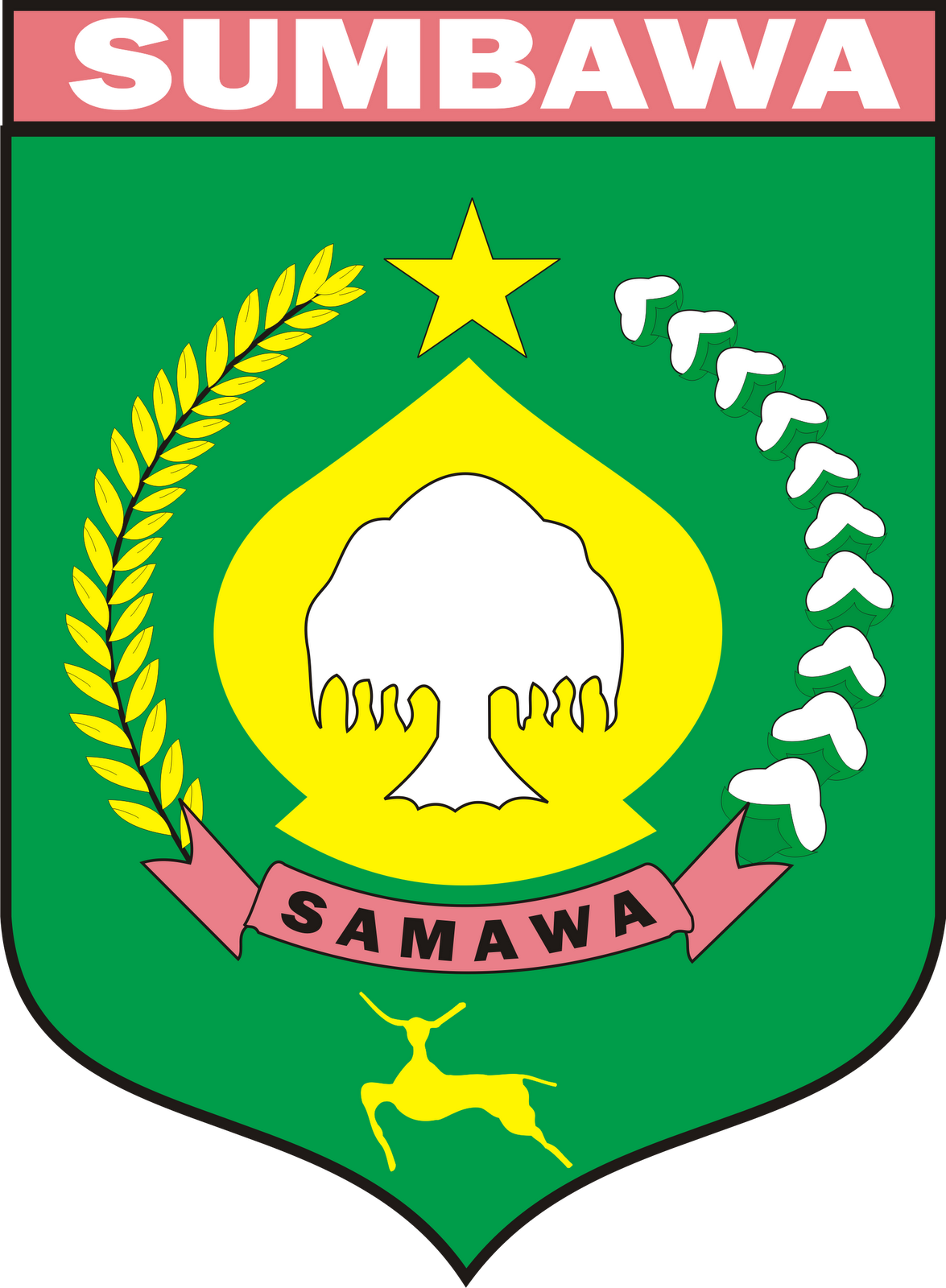
- Coat of arms

- Location within West Nusa Tenggara

- Location in Lesser Sunda Islands and Indonesia Sumbawa Regency (Indonesia)
- Coordinates: 8.744808°S 117.671525°E
- Country: Indonesia
- Province: West Nusa Tenggara
- Capital: Sumbawa Besar

Government
  - Regent: Syarafuddin Jarot
  - Vice Regent: Mohamad Ansori

Area
  - Total: 6,643.99 km^{2} (2,565.26 sq mi)

Population (mid 2025 estimate)
  - Total: 531,869
  - Density: 80.0526/km^{2} (207.335/sq mi)
- Time zone: UTC+8 (ICST)
- Area code: (+62) 371
- Website: sumbawakab.go.id

Sumbawa Regency (Indonesian: Kabupaten Sumbawa) is a Regency (Kabupaten) of the Indonesian Province of West Nusa Tenggara. It is located on the island of Sumbawa and covers an area of 6,643.99 km^{2}, following the separation on 18 December 2003 of what were until then its westernmost five districts to form the newly created West Sumbawa Regency. It includes the substantial island of Moyo, lying off the north coast of Sumbawa, as well as a number of smaller islands off the northwest coast of Sumbawa (in Alas Strait between Lombok and Sumbawa). The population of the Regency at the 2010 Census was 415,789, which rose at the 2020 Census to 509,753; the official estimate as at mid 2025 was 531,869 (comprising 266,023 males and 265,846 females). The capital is the town of Sumbawa Besar on the north coast of Sumbawa Island, south of Moyo Island.

== Administrative districts ==
Sumbawa Regency is divided into twenty-four administrative districts (kecamatan), listed below with their areas and their populations at the 2010 Census and the 2020 Census, together with the official estimates as at mid 2025. The table also includes the locations of the district administrative centres, the number of administrative villages in each district (totaling 157 rural villages (desa) and 8 urban villages (kelurahan), the latter all in Sumbawa town District), and its postal code(s).

Kode Wilayah	Name of District (kecamatan)	Area in km^{2}	Pop'n 2010 Census	Pop'n 2020 Census	Pop'n mid 2025 Estimate	Admin centre	No. of villages	Post code
52.04.02	Lunyuk ^{(a)}	513.74	18,109	22,118	23,737	Lunyuk Ode	7	84373
52.04.28	Orong Telu ^{(a)}	465.97	4,584	5,478	5,597	Kelawis	4	84374
52.04.05	Alas ^{(b)}	123.04	28,121	33,281	34,250	Dalam	8	84353
52.04.17	Alas Barat (Alas West) ^{(c)}	168.88	18,382	25,137	25,491	Usar Mapin	8	84354
52.04.20	Buer ^{(d)}	137.01	13,621	16,966	17,337	Labuhan Burung	6	84355
52.04.06	Utan	155.42	28,745	35,799	37,788	Jorok	9	84351
52.04.21	Rhee	230.82	6,899	9,091	9,550	Rhee	4	84352
52.04.07	Batu Lanteh	391.40	10,156	11,824	12,213	Kelungkung	6	84361
52.04.08	Sumbawa (town) (Sumbawa Besar)	44.83	56,337	62,753	65,502	Sumbawa	8 ^{(e)}	84311: 84318
52.04.18	Labuhan Badas ^{(f)}	435.89	29,092	35,427	36,943	Karang Dima	7	84316
52.04.22	Unter Iwes	82.38	18,150	23,366	24,954	Kerato	8	84310
52.04.09	Moyo Hilir ^{(g)} (Lower Moyo)	186.79	22,099	27,961	29,399	Moyo	10	84381
52.04.23	Moyo Utara ^{(g)} (North Moyo)	90.80	9,129	11,509	12,295	Sebewe	6	84380
52.04.10	Moyo Hulu ^{(g)} (Upper Moyo)	311.96	19,911	24,637	25,594	Semamung	12	84371
52.04.11	Ropang ^{(a)}	444.48	5,014	6,141	6,524	Ropang	5	84375
52.04.27	Lenangguar ^{(a)}	504.32	6,320	7,912	8,300	Lenangguar	4	84370
52.04.29	Lantung ^{(a)}	167.45	2,768	3,879	4,029	Lantung	4	84372
52.04.12	Lape	204.43	16,120	19,928	20,552	Dete	4	84382
52.04.26	Lopok	155.59	17,564	21,422	21,627	Langam	7	84388
52.04.13	Plampang ^{(h)}	418.69	27,834	34,453	36,077	Plampang	11	84386
52.03.19	Labangka ^{(h)}	243.08	10,212	13,283	14,920	Suka Damai	5	84383
52.04.24	Maronge ^{(h)}	274.75	9,771	12,007	12,284	Maronge	4	84387
52.04.14	Empang ^{(h)}	558.55	21,655	26,220	26,786	Empang Bawa	10	84384
52.04.25	Tarano ^{(h)}	333.71	15,196	19,161	20,120	Labuhan Bontong	8	84385
	Totals	6,643.99	415,789	509,753	531,869	Sumbawa Besar	165	

Note: (a) the five southern districts of Lunyuk, Orong Telu, Ropang, Lenangguar and Lantung are comparatively less densely populated; they cover a combined area of 2,095.96 km^{2} (31.5% of the regency) with 48,187 inhabitants (just 9.06% of the regency population) in mid 2025. Conversely, the five northwestern districts of Alas, Alas Barat, Buer, Utan and Rhee (including their offshore islands) cover a combined area of 815.17 km (12.27% of the regency) with 124,416 inhabitants (23.39% of the regency population) in mid 2025.
(b) including several small islands in the Alas Strait off the northwest coast of Sumbawa.
(c) including Panjang Island and Kalong Island in the Alas Strait off the northwest coast of Sumbawa.
(d) including Saringi Island, Bedil Island and 3 smaller islands off the northwest coast of Sumbawa.
(e) The 8 villages comprising Sumbawa (town) District are all classed as urban kelurahan (Brang Bara, Brang Biji, Bugis, Lempeh, Pekat, Samapuin, Seketeng and Uma Sima); the other 157 villages in the regency are all classed as rural desa.
(f) Labuhan Badas District comprises the substantial (in area) but sparsely populated island of Pulau Moyo (administratively, Labuhan Aji and Sebotok desa), covering 345 km^{2} with about 4,200 inhabitants; it also includes the smaller Pulau Medang (with even smaller Bajo Medang) to its west, and the small Pulau Sakonci to its northeast off the coast of the Sanggar Peninsula, together with an area of 66.46 km^{2} on mainland Sumbawa situated to the west of Sumbawa Besar (town), this mainland area containing most (29,389 people in 2024) of the district's population in the three suburban desa of Labuhan Sumbawa (14,878 inhabitants), Karang Dima (8,973) and Labuhan Badas (5,538).
(g) Note that the three districts with "Moyo" in their names do not include any part of Moyo Island, but are situated to its south on Sumbawa Island itself and on other small offshore islands.
(h) the last-named five districts constitute the eastern extension of the regency, with a combined area of 1,828.78 km^{2} and 110,207 inhabitants in mid 2025, based on the town of Plampang with 5,359 inhabitants in 2023.

== Sister Districts ==
Kulim, Malaysia
