= Bima language =

Austronesian language spoken in Indonesia

Bima
- Bimanese, Bima-Dompu
- Nggahi Mbojo
- Mbojo Script (Aksara Mbojo) in Bima (Mbojo script variant)
- Pronunciation: [ᵑɡa.hi ᵐbo.d͡ʒo]
- Native to: Indonesia
- Region: Eastern Sumbawa; Moyo Island; Banta Island; Sangeang Island; Komodo Island; Rinca Island; Western Flores
- Ethnicity: Bimanese; Dompuan
- Native speakers: (500,000 cited 1989)
- Language family: Austronesian: Malayo-Polynesian; Central Eastern Malayo-Polynesian; Central Malayo-Polyneaian (?); Bima
- Dialects: Bima; Dompu; Donggo; Kolo; Mbojo; Sangar (Sanggar); Toloweri
- Writing system: Latin alphabet (Bimanese Latin alphabet); Lontara script (Mbojo variant)

Official status
- Regulated by: Badan Pengembangan dan Pembinaan Bahasa

Language codes
- ISO 639-3: bhp
- Glottolog: bima1247
- ELP: Bima
- Bima is spoken by the majority of the population or as their mother language Bima is spoken by the majority of the population, but also concurrently by a large number of speakers of other languages Bima is a minority language

Bima (endonym: Nggahi Mbojo [ᵑɡa.hi ᵐbo.d͡ʒo]), or Bimanese, is an Austronesian language spoken on the eastern half of Sumbawa Island, Indonesia by the Bimanese and Dompuan peoples (Bima-Dompu), which it shares with speakers of the Sumbawa language. Bima territory includes the Sanggar Peninsula, where the extinct Papuan language, Tambora, was once spoken. Bima is an exonym; the autochthonous name for the territory is Mbojo and the language is referred to as Nggahi Mbojo. There are over half a million Bima speakers. Neither the Bima nor the Sumbawa people have alphabets of their own for they use the alphabets of the Bugis and the Malay language indifferently.

Bimanese is also spoken in several areas of Sumbawa Regency, Lombok, and East Nusa Tenggara (primaly in Komodo island and eastern part of Flores). In Flores, Bima is spoken by people in the Reo, Pota, and East Manggarai regions.

== Classification ==
Long thought to be closely related to the languages of Sumba Island to the southeast, this assumption has been refuted by Blust (2008), which makes Bima a primary branch within the Central–Eastern Malayo-Polynesian subgroup.

== Distribution ==
The Bimanese language is mostly spoken in the eastern part of the island of Sumbawa in Indonesia, including Bima Regency, Dompu Regency, and Bima City. It also spoken in the islands of Banta, Moyo, Sangeang, Komodo and Rinca. In Sumbawa Regency, this language is spoken in the districts of Empang, Plampang, Lape, Lopok, and Taliwang. The speakers can also be found in western part of Flores, particularly in the districts of Sambi Rampas (Pota village) and Reo.

== Dialects ==
According to Ethnologue, dialects of the language include Bima, Dompu, Donggo, Kolo, Mbojo, Sangar (Sanggar), and Toloweri.

Donggo, spoken in mountainous regions to the west of Bima Bay, such as in Soromandi and in the east, especially in Donggo, is closely related to the main dialect of Bimanese. It is spoken by about 25,000 people who were formerly primarily Christians and animists; many have converted to Islam, mostly as a result of intermarriages.

== Phonology ==
=== Consonants ===
Consonant phonemes
		Labial	Alveolar	Palatal	Velar	Glottal
Nasal		m	n	ɲ	ŋ	
Plosive/ Affricate	voiceless	p	t	tʃ	k	ʔ
Plosive/ Affricate	voiced	b	d	dʒ	ɡ	
Plosive/ Affricate	prenasal vl.	ᵐp	ⁿt	ᶮtʃ	ᵑk	
Plosive/ Affricate	prenasal vd.	ᵐb	ⁿd	ᶮdʒ	ᵑɡ	
Plosive/ Affricate	implosive	ɓ	ɗ			
Fricative		f	s			h
Lateral			l			
Trill			r			
Approximant		w		j		

=== Vowels ===
Vowel phonemes
	Front	Central	Back
Close	i		u
Mid	e		o
Open		a	

Vowels /i e o u/ can have shortened allophones as [ɪ ɛ ɔ ʊ].
