= Waworada Bay =

Bay on Sumbawa Island, Indonesia

Waworada Bay or Waworada Gulf (Indonesian: Teluk Waworada) is a slender bay facing the Indian Ocean on Sumbawa Island, in the Bima Regency of the Indonesian Province of West Nusa Tenggara.

The bay opens towards Sape Strait.
