= Kawinda Toi =

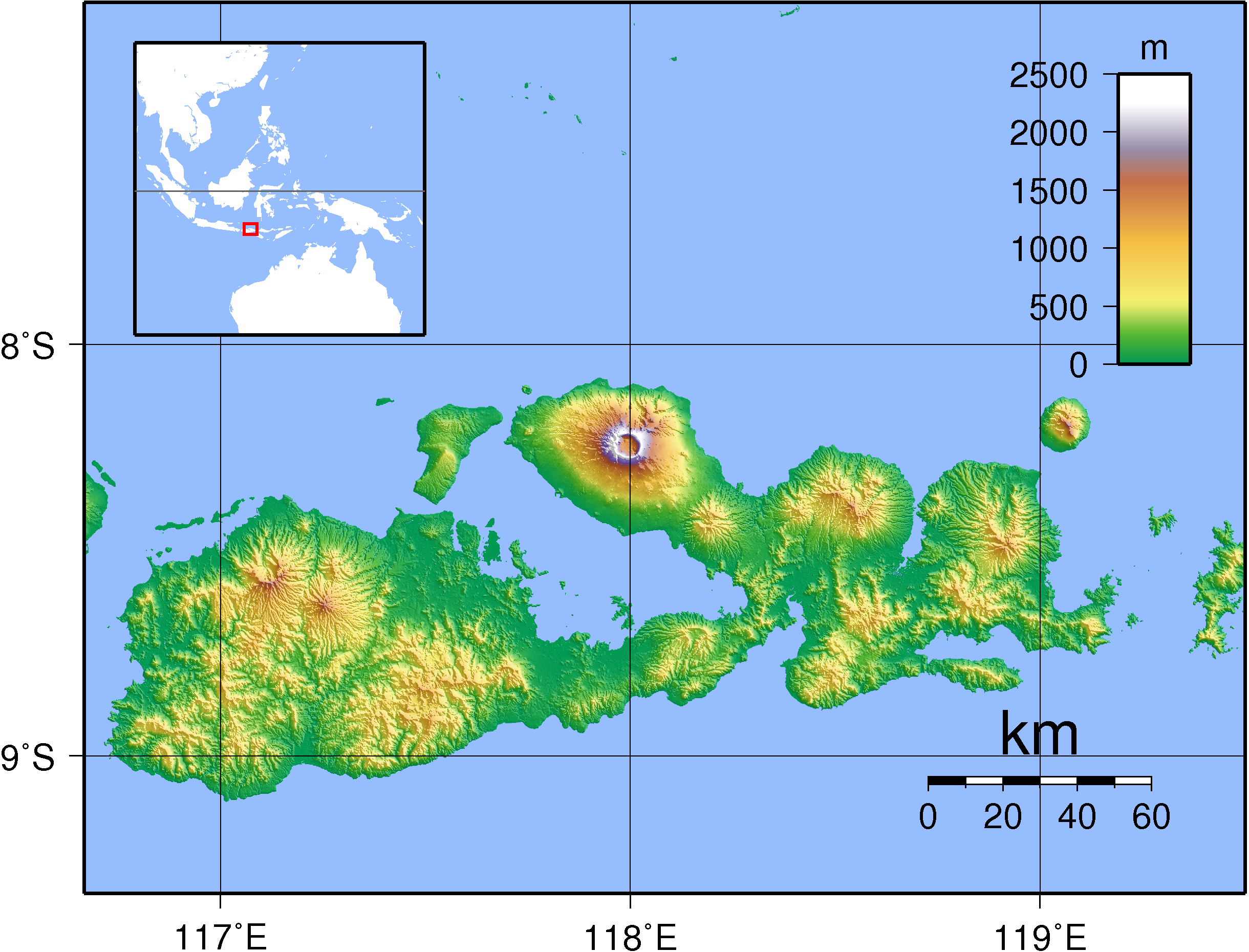
- Location in West Nusa Tenggara and Indonesia Kawinda Toi (Lesser Sunda Islands) Kawinda Toi (Indonesia)
- Coordinates: 8°16′2.1072″S 117°56′57.1596″E
- Country: Indonesia
- Province: West Nusa Tenggara
- Regency: Bima Regency
- District: Tambora District
- Elevation: 6,129 ft (1,868 m)

Population (2010)
  - Total: 1,058
- Time zone: UTC+8 (Indonesia Central Standard Time)

Kawinda Toi is a village in Tambora District, Bima Regency in West Nusa Tenggara Province. Its population is 1058.

== Climate ==
Kawinda Toi has a subtropical highland climate (Cfb). It has moderate to heavy rainfall from May to October and very heavy to extremely heavy rainfall from November to April.

Climate data for Kawinda Toi
Month	Jan	Feb	Mar	Apr	May	Jun	Jul	Aug	Sep	Oct	Nov	Dec	Year
Mean daily maximum °C (°F)	19.9 (67.8)	19.7 (67.5)	20.4 (68.7)	20.5 (68.9)	20.0 (68.0)	19.1 (66.4)	19.1 (66.4)	19.9 (67.8)	20.6 (69.1)	21.1 (70.0)	20.0 (68.0)	19.6 (67.3)	20.0 (68.0)
Daily mean °C (°F)	15.5 (59.9)	15.4 (59.7)	15.8 (60.4)	15.6 (60.1)	15.2 (59.4)	14.3 (57.7)	13.9 (57.0)	14.3 (57.7)	14.9 (58.8)	15.6 (60.1)	15.6 (60.1)	15.3 (59.5)	15.1 (59.2)
Mean daily minimum °C (°F)	11.2 (52.2)	11.1 (52.0)	11.3 (52.3)	10.8 (51.4)	10.4 (50.7)	9.6 (49.3)	8.8 (47.8)	8.8 (47.8)	9.3 (48.7)	10.2 (50.4)	11.2 (52.2)	11.1 (52.0)	10.3 (50.6)
Average precipitation mm (inches)	856 (33.7)	644 (25.4)	600 (23.6)	340 (13.4)	174 (6.9)	107 (4.2)	70 (2.8)	59 (2.3)	76 (3.0)	128 (5.0)	320 (12.6)	559 (22.0)	3,933 (154.9)
Source: Climate-Data.org
