= Oi Panihi =

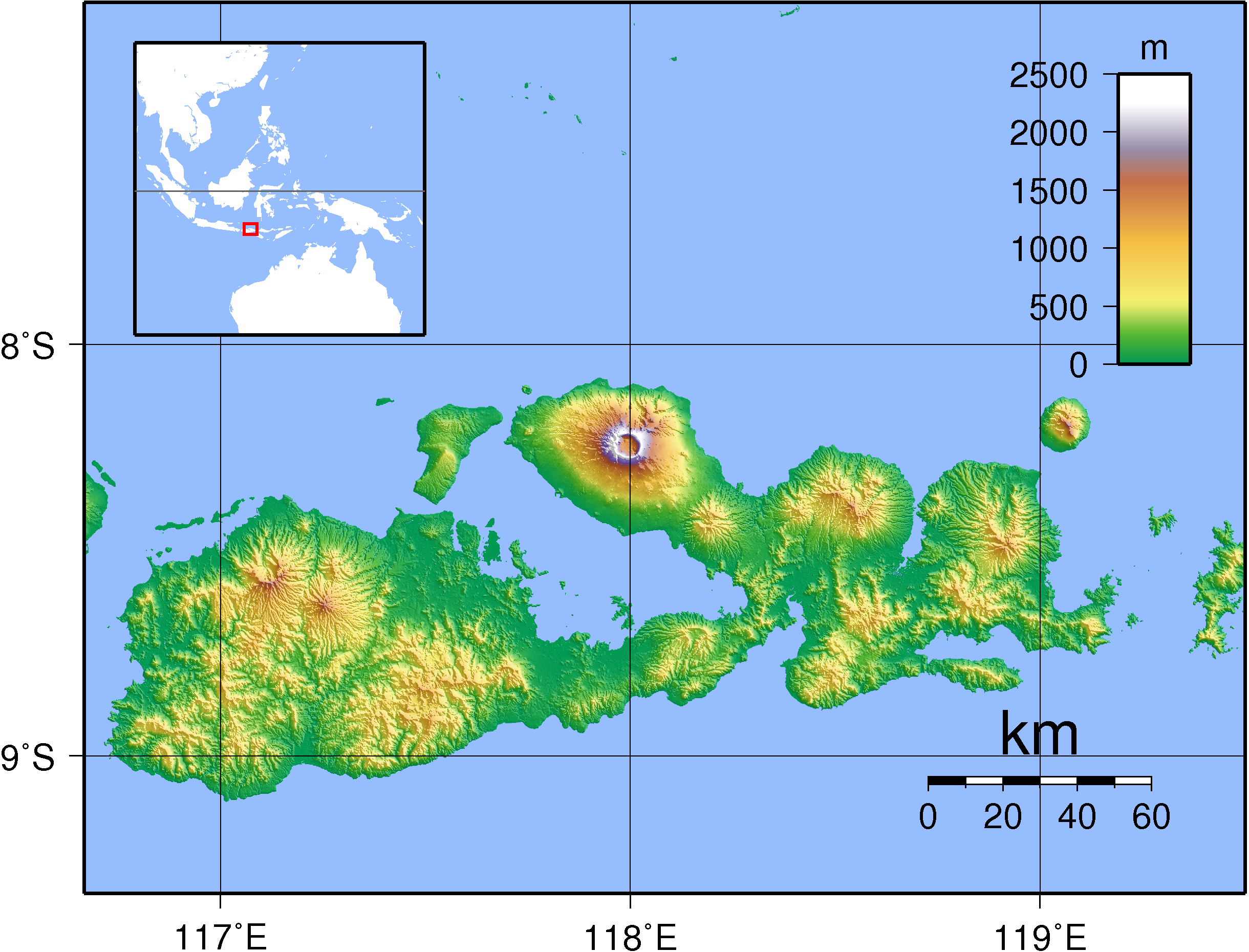
- Location in West Nusa Tenggara and Indonesia Oi Panihi (Lesser Sunda Islands) Oi Panihi (Indonesia)
- Coordinates: 8°8′29.22″S 117°55′36.3828″E
- Country: Indonesia
- Province: West Nusa Tenggara
- Regency: Bima Regency
- District: Tambora District
- Elevation: 3,320 ft (1,012 m)

Population (2010)
  - Total: 475
- Time zone: UTC+8 (Indonesia Central Standard Time)

Oi Panihi is a village in Tambora district, Bima regency in the West Nusa Tenggara province of Indonesia. Its population in 2010 was 475.

== Climate ==
Oi Panihi has a tropical rainforest climate (Af). It has moderate rainfall from June to September and heavy to very heavy rainfall in the remaining months.

Climate data for Oi Panihi
Month	Jan	Feb	Mar	Apr	May	Jun	Jul	Aug	Sep	Oct	Nov	Dec	Year
Mean daily maximum °C (°F)	24.5 (76.1)	24.0 (75.2)	25.0 (77.0)	25.1 (77.2)	24.5 (76.1)	23.9 (75.0)	23.9 (75.0)	24.8 (76.6)	25.4 (77.7)	25.7 (78.3)	24.6 (76.3)	24.1 (75.4)	24.6 (76.3)
Daily mean °C (°F)	20.1 (68.2)	19.7 (67.5)	20.5 (68.9)	20.3 (68.5)	19.6 (67.3)	18.9 (66.0)	18.5 (65.3)	18.9 (66.0)	19.5 (67.1)	20.1 (68.2)	20.2 (68.4)	19.9 (67.8)	19.7 (67.4)
Mean daily minimum °C (°F)	15.7 (60.3)	15.5 (59.9)	16.1 (61.0)	15.5 (59.9)	14.7 (58.5)	14.0 (57.2)	13.1 (55.6)	13.1 (55.6)	13.6 (56.5)	14.6 (58.3)	15.8 (60.4)	15.7 (60.3)	14.8 (58.6)
Average precipitation mm (inches)	846 (33.3)	576 (22.7)	562 (22.1)	318 (12.5)	147 (5.8)	116 (4.6)	62 (2.4)	62 (2.4)	66 (2.6)	97 (3.8)	289 (11.4)	495 (19.5)	3,636 (143.1)
Source: Climate-Data.org
