= Bima Bay =

Coordinates: 8.4504°S 118.7045°E

Bima Bay from the west side

Bima Bay (Indonesian: Teluk Bima) is a major waterway on the north side of the island of Sumbawa, and is adjacent to Bima City and Bima Regency (formerly Sultanate of Bima). It contains the island Kambing Island (Bima), as well as the Bima harbor (Pelabuhan Bima).
