= Bima Sultanate =

Precolonial state of Indonesia

The Settlements and Lands of Mbojo كسلطانن بيم (Malay) Kesultanan Bima (Malay) Rasa ro Dana Mbojo (Bima) (Note: As there is little known about the linguistics of the Bima language in the english-speaking world, the only known native name for the Bima Sultanate, is written in the latin script.)
- c. 1621–1958
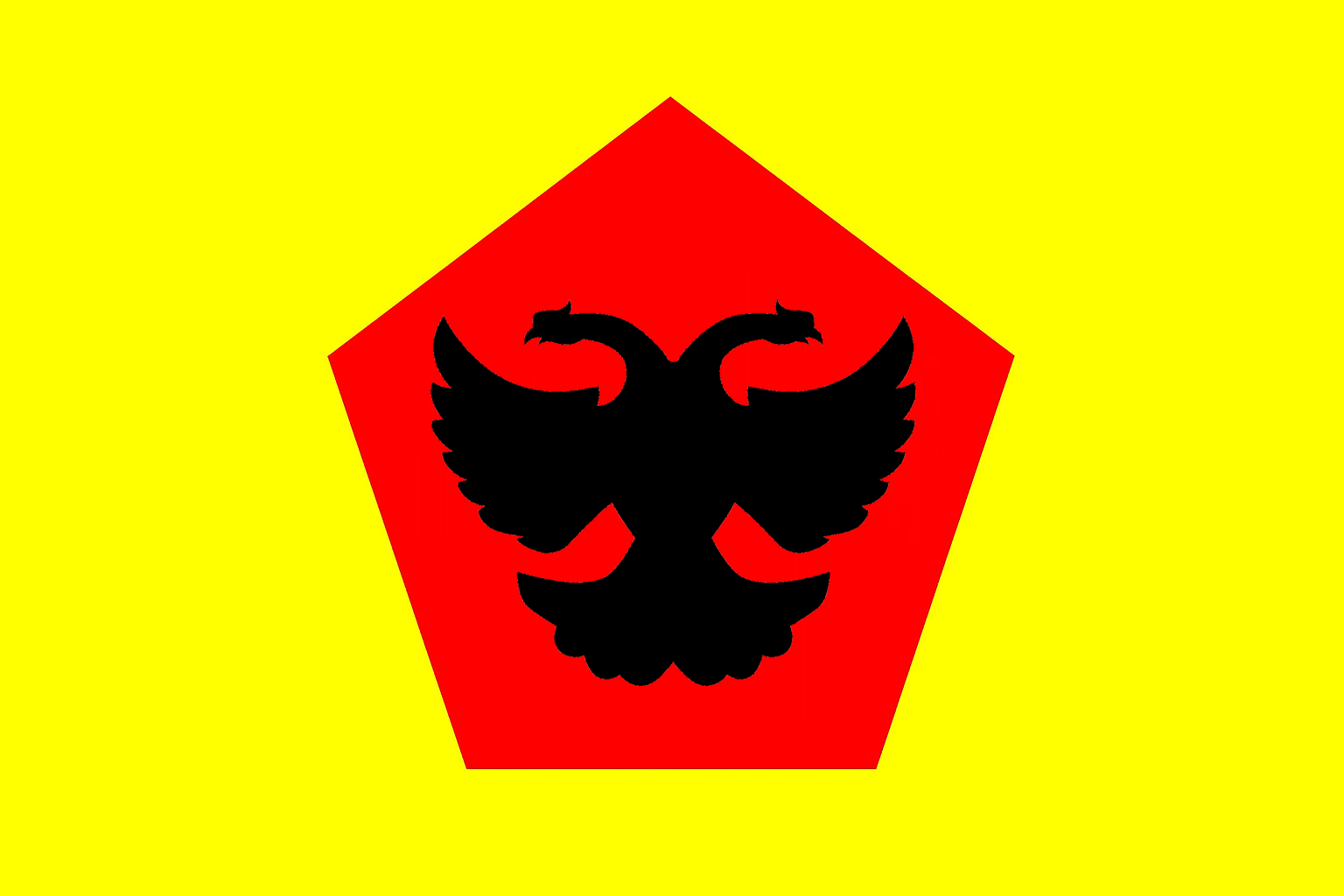
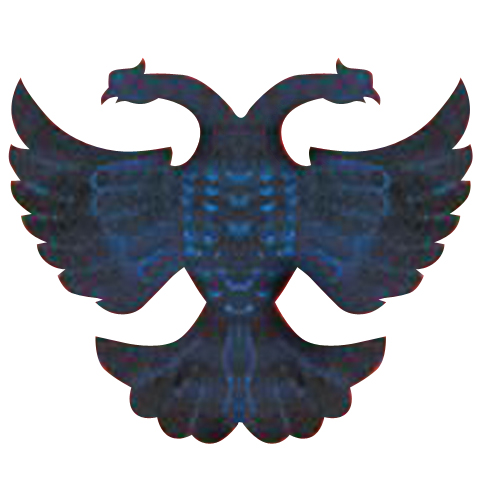
- Flag Coat of arms

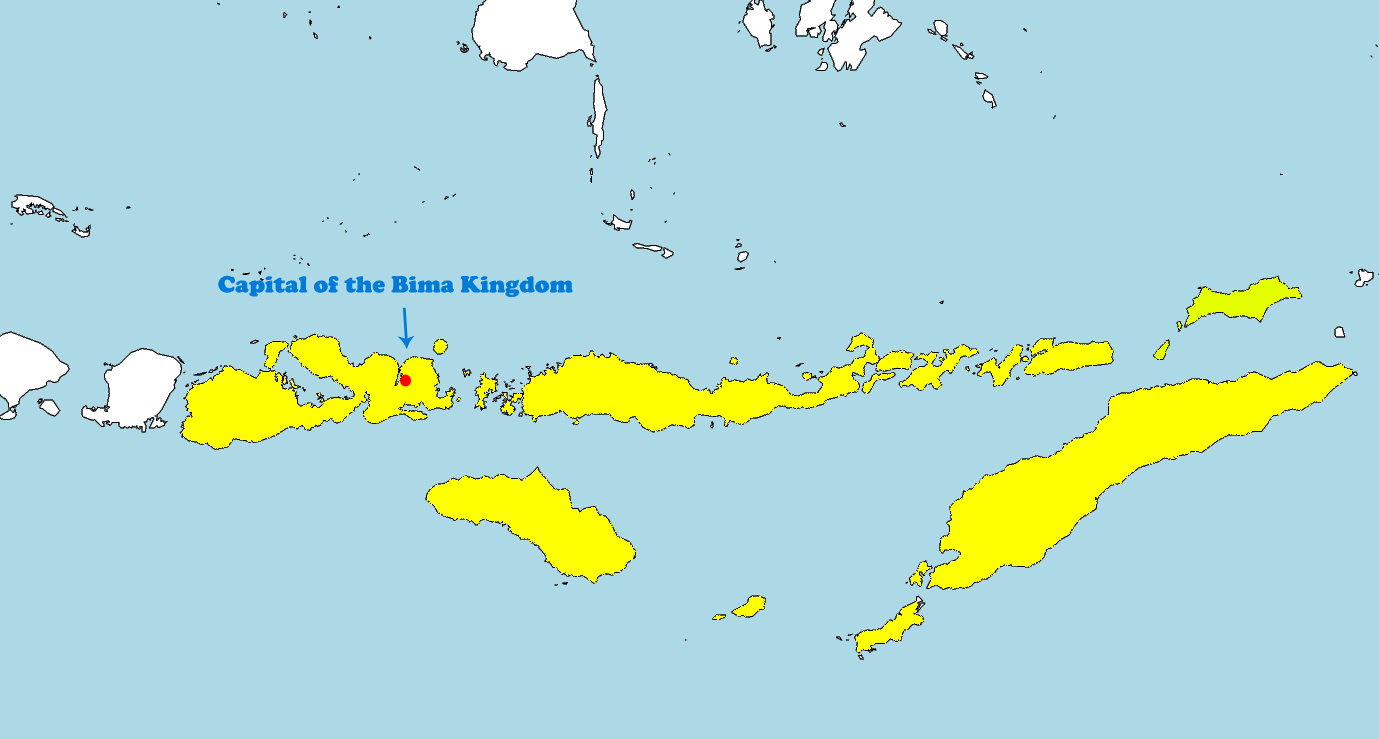
- Greatest extent of the Bima Kingdom era at its Peak in the 15th Century under the Leadership of Tureli Manggampo Bilmana.
- Capital: Bima
- Official languages: Bima (Nggahi Mbojo)
- Common languages: Bima
- Religion: Islam
- Demonym: Dou Mbojo
- Government: Islamic Monarchy
- Sultan (Ruma Sangaji)
  - 1620–1640 (first): Abdul Kahir
  - 1915–1951 (last): Muhammad Salahuddin
- Legislature: Sara Dana Mbojo
- Historical era: Spread of Islam in Indonesia and Dutch colonisation
  - Islamization: c. 1621
  - Suzerainty to Dutch East India Company: 1667
  - Absorption into Indonesia: 17 August 1958
- Currency: Netherlands Indies gulden
Preceded by
Kingdom of Bima
Succeeded by
Dutch East Indies
United States of Indonesia
Indonesia
- Today part of: Indonesia

The Sultanate of Bima (Malay: كسلطانن بيم, romanized: Kesultanan Bima), officially known as The Settlements and Lands of Mbojo (Bima: Rasa ro Dana Mbojo), alternatively the Kingdom of Bima (Malay: کرجاءن بيم, romanized: Kerajaan Bima), was a Muslim state in the eastern part of Sumbawa in Indonesia, at the site of the present-day regency of Bima. It was a regionally important polity which formed the eastern limit of Islam in this part of Indonesia and developed an elite culture inspired by the Makassarese and the Malays models. Bima was subjected to indirect colonial rule from 1908 to 1949 and ceased to be a sultanate in 1958.

== History ==
=== Origins ===
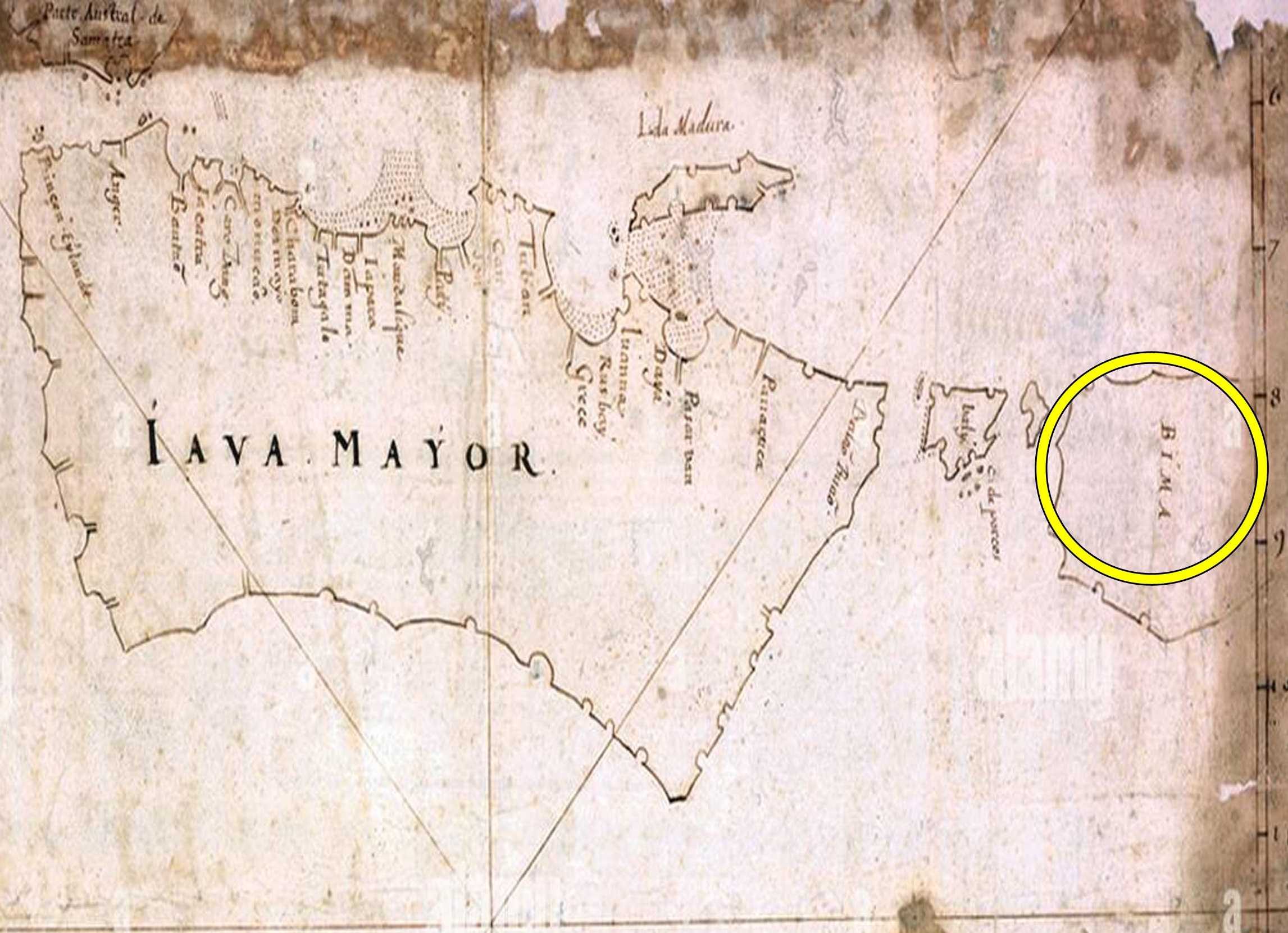
Bima's territory first appeared on the earliest Malay-Portuguese map created by Europeans in 1563

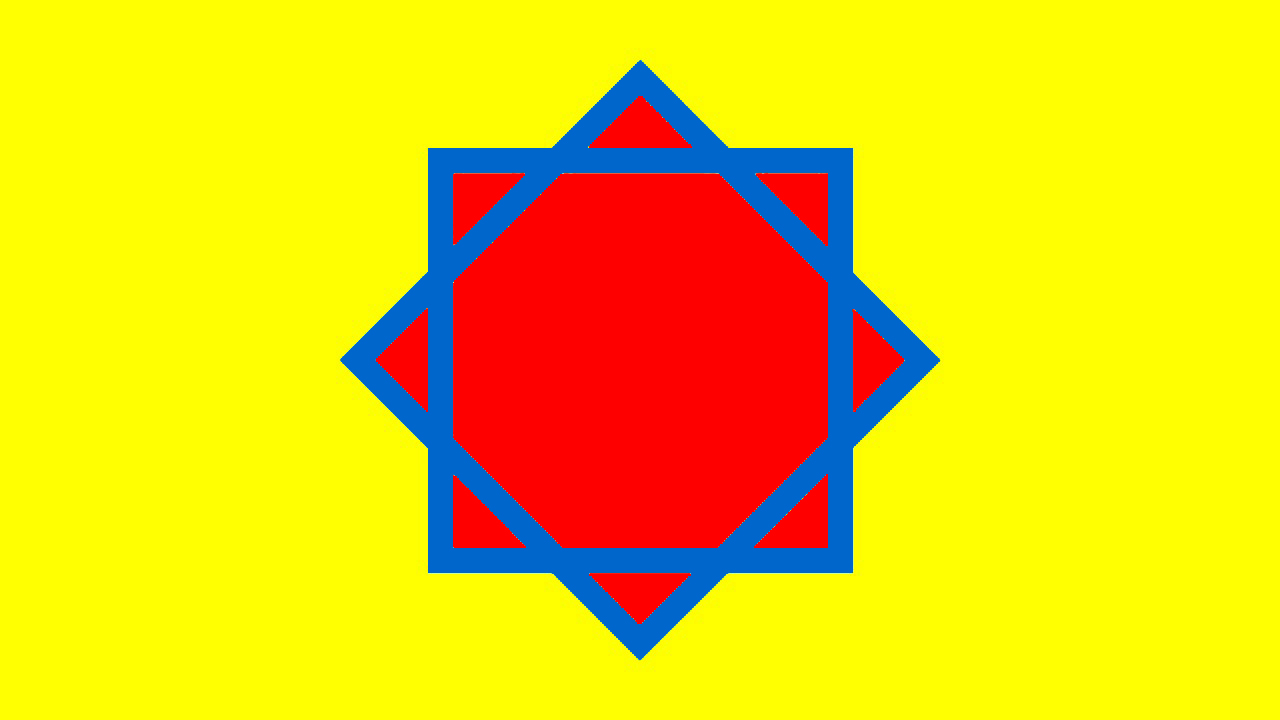
The Nggusu Waru (Octagon) flag of the Bima Kingdom, Siwa-Buda (Hindu-Budha) era.

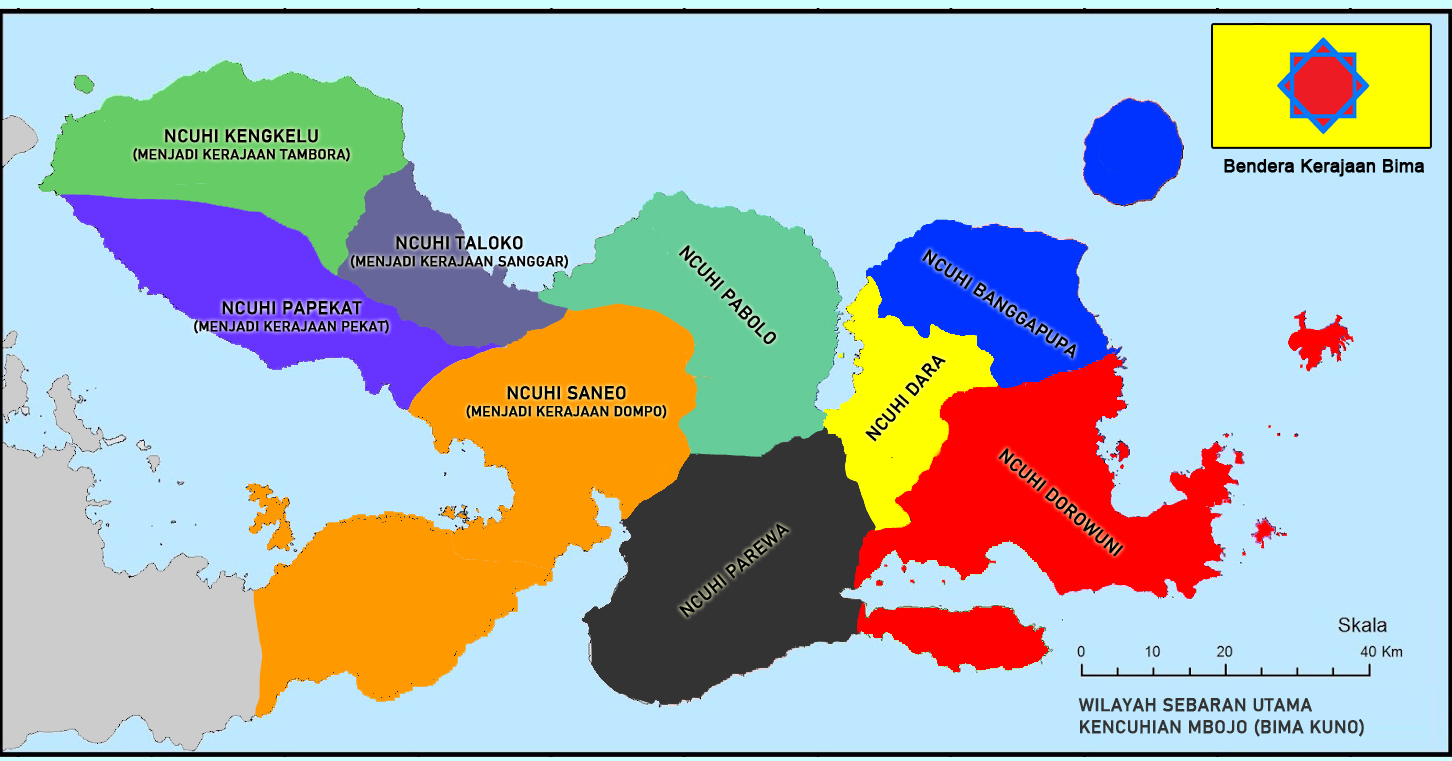
The Main Distribution Area of the Mbojo Tribe and the Ncuhi Mbojo Area (Ancient Bima) before being divided into East Bima and West Bima (Dompu) in the 13th/14th century.

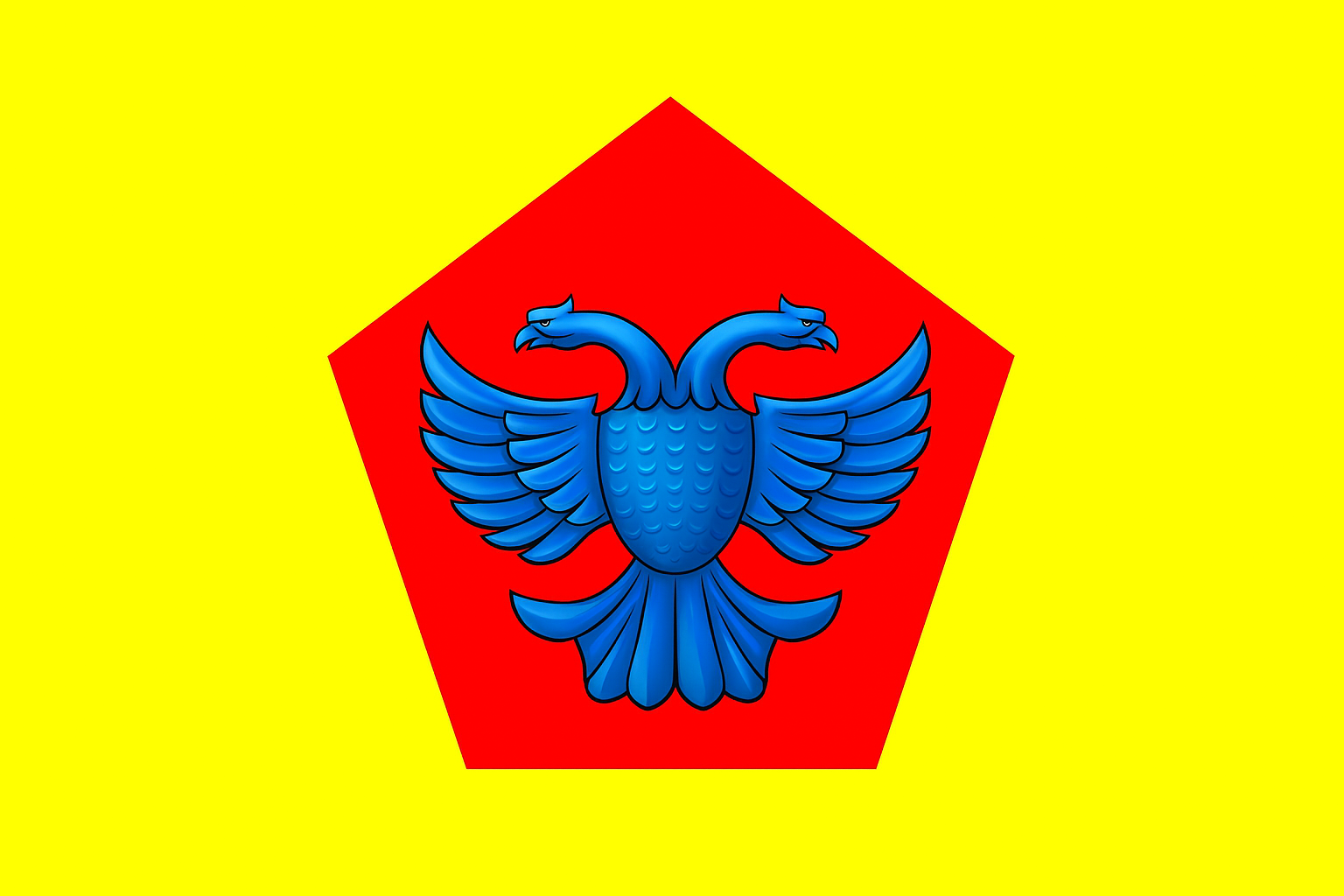
The Nggusu Lima (Pentagon) flag of the Bima Kingdom, the Islamic Sultanate era.

From early times, Sumbawa Island was divided in six kingdoms called Sumbawa (previously, they were still separate small chiefdom, which is called the Kedatuan. Such as the Kedatuan of Taliwang, the Kedatuan of Seran, and the Kedatuan of Jereweh, atc., which later united in 1648 to form the Sultanate of Sumbawa), Tambora, Dompu, Pekat, Sanggar and Bima. Of these, the last four spoke Nggahi Mbojo, the language of the Bimanese people, related to the languages of Flores and Sumba. The Hindu-Buddhist Bima Kingdom was the forerunner of the Sultanate of Bima and was probably founded around the 8th century, the exact year was 631 Saka, or 709 AD, based on the age of the Wadu Paa site, which was carved by Sang Bhima upon his first arrival in the land of Mbojo (the ancient name before it became known as Bima).. The indigenous name for the kingdom is Mbojo.

Local historical legends speak of two brothers, Indera Jambrut and Indera Kemala, who were sons of the mythical hero Bhima and a golden dragon woman and had supernatural powers. They arrived to Sumbawa from the island Satonda and were acknowledged as rulers of the land. There are few historical sources about Bima from the 15th and 16th centuries. At least by the 17th century, the system of government was partly adapted to the system prevailing in the Kingdom of Gowa on Sulawesi. Besides the Sangaji (king) and the Tureli Nggampo (executive regent), the administration of the kingdom included appointed Tureli (ministers), Jeneli (subdistrict chiefs), and Gelarang (village headmen).

Shipping and commerce grew rapidly, as attested by the Portuguese Tomé Pires (c. 1515) who says that Bima exported clothes, horses, slaves, and Brazilwood though this is most likely Sappanwood. While Java was the main cultural referent in the beginning, relations with South Sulawesi later became important. Ships and boats increased in number and quality and followed the patterns of navigation and commerce sustained by the Gowa empire.

With increased political integration of the kingdom, the security of the land was enhanced as well. The facilities of the army and navy, and the quality of the weaponry, were updated. An official called the Renda served as commander of the army. The navy was led by an admiral who was called Pabise. Thus, at the end of the 15th century the Kingdom of Bima Mbojo evolved into a crowded commercial center in the eastern archipelago, at the side of Gowa and Ternate. At that time, the Kingdom of Bima Mbojo was a storehouse of rice in the area, similar to Lombok.

The kingdom saw developments in the field of literature, art and culture. Historical tradition asserts that two princes called Mawaa Bilmana and Manggampo Donggo were sent to Gowa in Sulawesi to gather useful knowledge. After some years they returned and used their acquired skills to reform society, planning wet rice fields, improving irrigation systems, and appointing local functionaries.

The territory of the Bima Mbojo kingdom stretched from the small islands in the Alas Strait on the western side of Sumbawa Island to the islands east of Sumbawa. According to tradition, Aside from the territories on Sumbawa Island, the dependencies included Manggarai, Ende and Larantuka on Flores, Sumba, Sawu, Alor, Solor and Tanah Naro (Bobonaro, Timur Leste). Where the Kingdom of Bima only collected taxes or tributes from these territories. Expansion in the region was conducted by La Mbila and La Ara, the sons of king Bilmana who may have flourished around the mid-15th century. The kingdom of Bima Mbojo continued to flourish until the death of Sangaji Wa'a Ndapa Ma, son of Manggampo Donggo, around the end of the 16th century AD.

=== Becoming a Sultanate ===
The kingdom of Makassar conducted a series of military campaigns in all directions in the early 17th century, partly with the aim to spread Islam in the archipelago. Sumbawa was attacked through three expeditions in 1618, 1619, and 1626. One rationale of the invasions was to secure deliveries of rice, which Makassar needed to maintain its expansion policy.

According to Bimanese tradition written down in the Bo (an old record of historical events in the Bima Palace), king number XXVI (in another count XXXVI), Mantau Asi Sawo, signed a contract of alliance with Makassar. When he died, power was usurped by the prince Salisi who killed Sawo's son and heir during a hunting party. Sawo's younger son La Kai fled to Teke in the east and allied with the Makassarese. He accepted Islam on 15 Rabiulawal 1030 AH (7 February 1621) and was instructed in the faith by the renowned missionary Dato' ri Bandang. Salisi successfully resisted the Makassarese forces for a while, but was eventually defeated by a fleet from Sulawesi led by the Bimanese grandee La Mbila.

La Kai was installed as king number XXXVII, with the title "Ta Ma Bata Wadu Ruma" (He who has a stone grave). According to the Bo this king was married to the sister of the wife of Sultan Alauddin of Makassar named Daeng Sikontu, who was the daughter of Karaeng Kassuarang. The king, hitherto known by the title Sangaji Bima, was entitled "Sultan" of Bima and adopted the Muslim name Sultan Abdul Kahir. A rebellion against his Makassarese-backed rule took place in 1632-33, but was beaten down by troops from Sulawesi.

After Sultan Bima I died in 1640 he was succeeded by his son Sirajuddin or Sultan Abu'l-Khair who became Sultan Bima II. He was born in April 1627 (Ramadan 1038 H) and bore the title Uma Teak Ruma. He was also named La Mbila, and the Makassarese called him "I Ambela". He married the sister of Sultan Hasanuddin of Makassar, whose name was Karaeng Bonto Je'ne, on 13 September 1646 (22 Rajab 1066 AH), the wedding taking place in Makassar. Abu'l-Khair Sirajuddin was crowned Sultan Bima II in 1640 (1050 H).

He was a person of some ability who assisted Makassar in warfare outside Sumbawa a number of times. Now the influence of Islam was deepened through the efforts of the preacher Dato Maharajalela, who arrived to Bima with six Malay companions. The system of government changed and became based on "Hadat and Islamic Law", in other words a mixture between indigenous customs and religious principles. It was valid until the reign of Sultan Bima XIII (Sultan Ibrahim, 1881-1915). He died on July 22, 1682 (17 Rajab 1099 AH), and was buried in Tolobali.

Abubakar Sultan Nuruddin Ali Syah was the son of Sultan Abu'l-Khair Sirajuddin. He was born on December 5, 1651 (29 Dhul-Hijjah 1061 AH). The Makassarese gave him the title "bung Mappara Din Daeng Matali Karaeng Panaragang". The new sultan ascended the throne in 1682 (Dhul-Hijjah 1093 AH). He was married to Tamemang Daeng, daughter of Raja Tallo Karaeng Langkese, on May 7, 1684 (22 Jumada 1095 H). Thus there was a constant policy of intermarriage with Makassarese princesses, a tradition that was maintained until the mid-18th century, long after the introduction of Dutch suzerainty. After his death, he was entitled "Ma Ruma Wa'a Paju", because he was the first to have a yellow parasol known as "Paju Monca" - parasols were important symbols of kingship in Southeast Asia.

The early-modern Bimanese state has been characterized as remarkably structured for its time. Society was divided into two noble classes called ruma and rato, and a class of free people, dou mardika. Under them was a category of slaves, who were often taken from Manggarai on Flores or Sumba. The population was divided into a large number of task groups called dari, sometimes likened to European guilds since they were defined according their hereditary profession. The king, his vizier (Ruma Bicara), and the royal council, had the ability to reach down to village level and could therefore ensure a relatively stable society.

=== Dutch overlordship ===
During the reign of Abu'l-Khair Sirajuddin the Makassar empire was soundly defeated by the Dutch East India Company (VOC) in 1667 and again in 1669. As a consequence the Makassarese formally lost their vast possessions in eastern Indonesia, including their suzerainty over Sumbawa. The Bima Sultanate surrendered to the VOC on 8 December 1669 with an agreement signed in Batavia (Jakarta).

The position of Bima and the other five kingdoms on Sumbawa was initially that of subordinated allies of the VOC. Since Bima was the most important polity on the island, a Dutch posthouder was placed close to the sultan's court. The colonial overlords were keen on securing deliveries of the valuable Sappanwood from the Sumbawan forests, and enforced a monopoly on exports of the wood that lasted until 1874. The Dutch presence was nevertheless marginal, and Bima largely managed its own affairs. Its cultural ties to Sulawesi were not severed, which was shown by marital relations between Bimanese and Makassarese aristocracies. Politically, Bima tried to secure a grip over non-Muslim lands in the region. The sultanate had vague pretensions on Sumba and vied with Makassar over influence in Manggarai on Flores. A Makassarese princess married a Bimanese prince in 1727, and the court of Makassar claimed Manggarai as a sunrang (bridewealth), leading to a long dispute over this area. The Bimanese of Manggarai made Reo their center. The Sultan was represented by a "deputy of the throne of the kingdom" (Jawi: نايب تخت کرجاءن; romanized: naib tahta kerajaan). The sultanate was struck by disaster in 1815 when the Tambora Volcano erupted, causing destruction and severe famine.

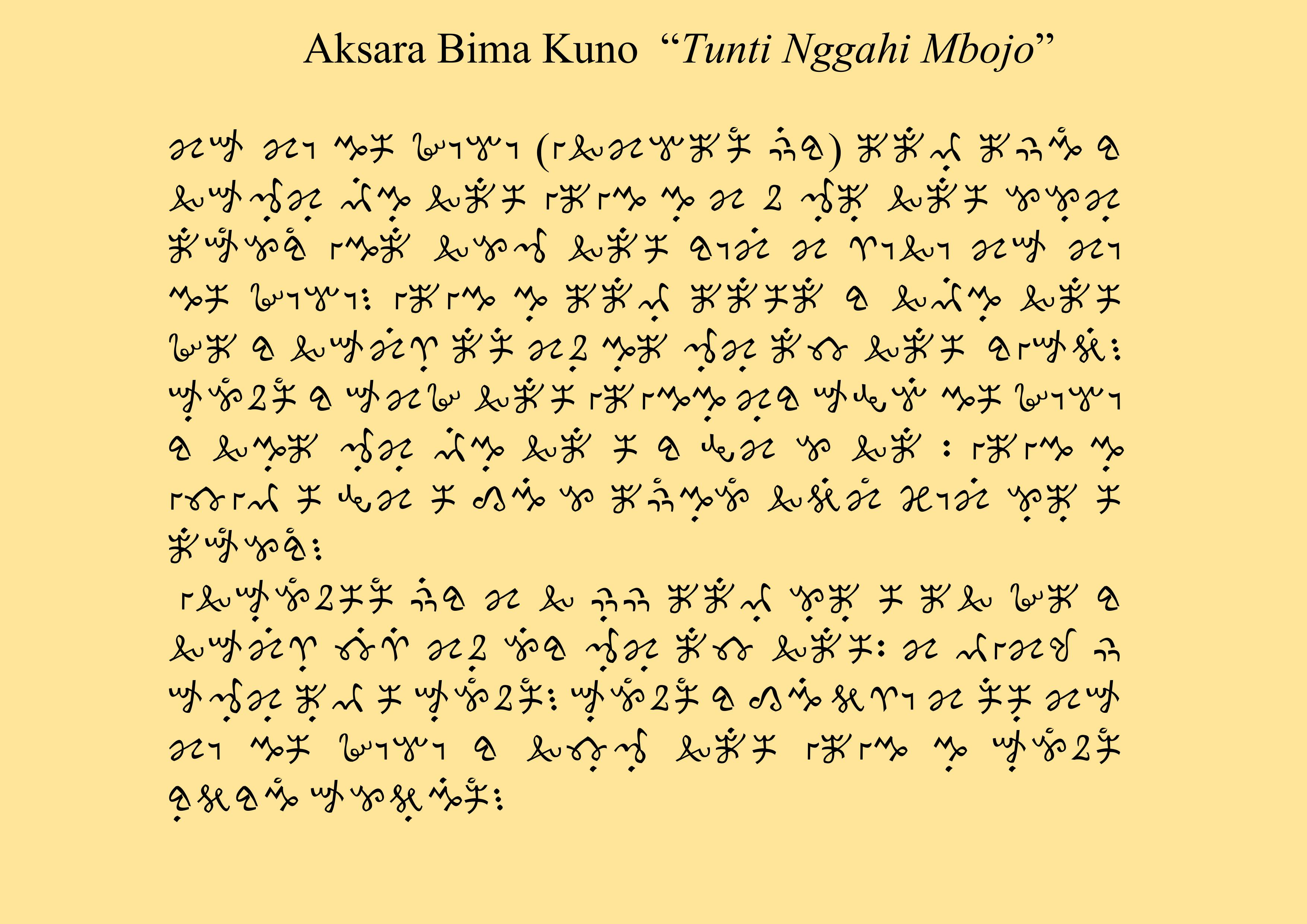
The ancient Bima script, known as Tunti Mbojo. Is derived from the Pallava-Kawi script.

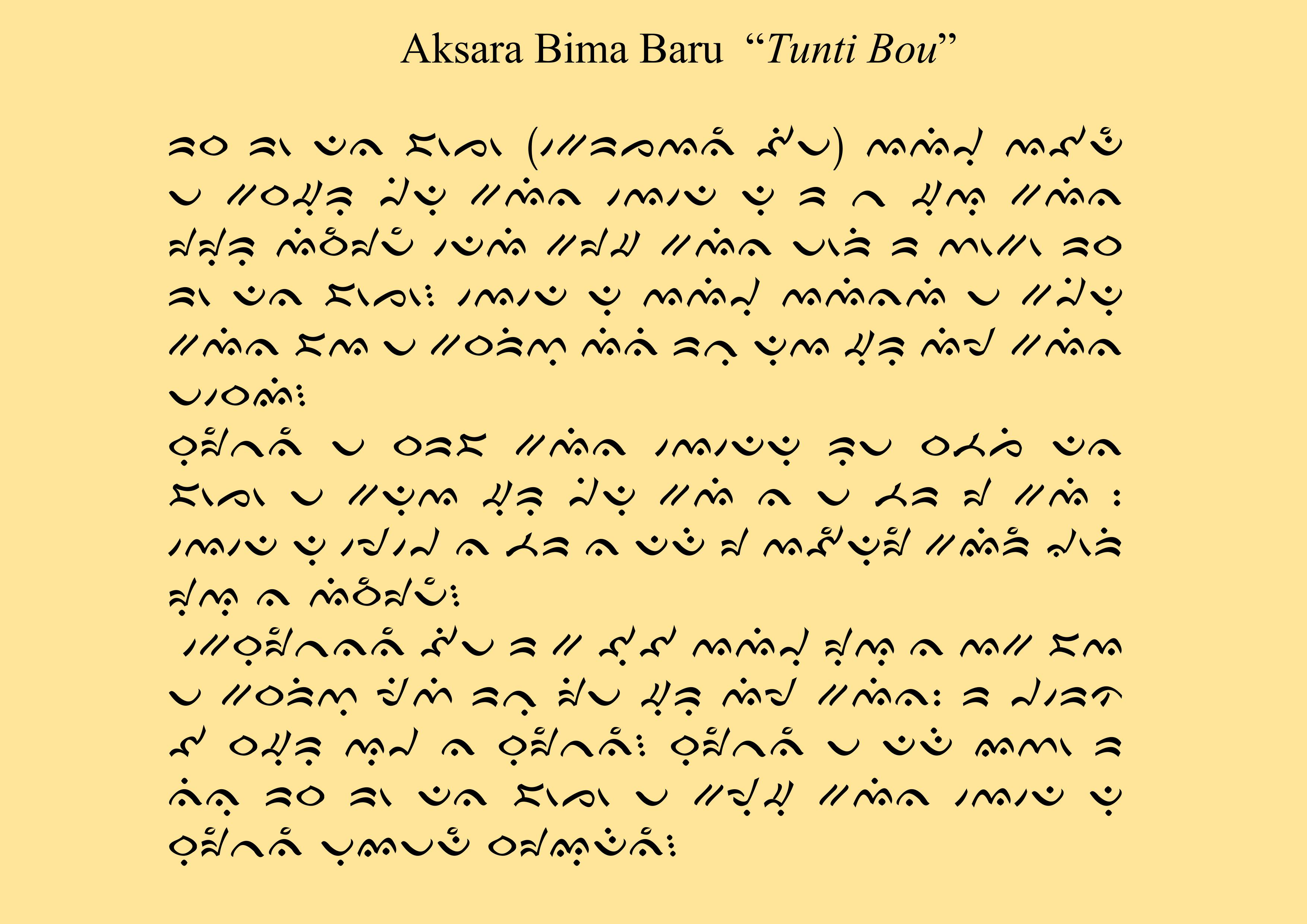
The new Bima script, influenced by intense trade relations with the Bugis-Makassar around the 17th century, is known as Tunti Bou. It was later replaced by the Pegon/Malay Arabic script during the Sultanate era.

The 19th century was otherwise a relatively tranquil period in the history of the sultanate. However, the Dutch colonial state increasingly tried to control local governance. In 1905 Bima was turned into a "fief" (leen) and Sultan Ibrahim had to give up the rights to foreign trade. Also, taxation was reorganized and handled by the colonial authorities. The increasing European encroachment led to a few minor uprisings, especially in Ngali in 1908-09. In 1920 Bima lost control over Manggarai, but the sultan was partly recompensed with Sanggar, a neighbouring kingdom that was merged with Bima in 1928.

The Japanese invaded the Dutch East Indies in 1941-42 and the Dutch administration on Sumbawa quickly broke down. The Japanese occupants left the sultans of Bima and (West) Sumbawa in place, and allowed Sultan Muhammad Salahuddin to incorporate another neighbour, the Dompu Sultanate, in his realm. After the proclamation of Indonesian independence in August 1945, the sultan of Bima at first favoured the new republic. However, the Dutch rapidly retook their former positions on Sumbawa and forced Muhammad Salahuddin to hand back Dompu to its own sultan family.

Together with large parts of the eastern archipelago, the sultans on the island were pressed to join the new Dutch-created quasi state of East Indonesia in December 1946. This state eventually joined the federal Indonesian republic in 1949 and was dissolved in the following year. Sultan Muhammad Salahuddin died in Jakarta in 1951. His son Abdul Kahir served as head of the self-ruling territory (kepala daerah swapraja) in 1953-57. In 1958, finally, the Sumbawan principalities were abolished by the Indonesian republic and replaced by a modern bureaucratic structure.

== List of rulers ==
=== Kings of Bima ===
The list of kings of Bima:

- Indera Jambrut
- Batara Indera Bima (son)
- Batara Sang Luka (son)
- Batara Sang Bima (son)
- Batara Matra Indarwata (son)
- Batara Matra Inderatarati (brother)
- Manggampo Jawa (son)
- Puteri Ratna Lila (sister)
- Maharaja Indera Kumala (brother)
- Batara Indera Luka (son)
- Maharaja Bima Indera Seri (son)
- Mawaä Paju Longge (son)
- Mawaä Indera Mbojo (brother)
- Mawaä Bilmana (brother)
- Manggampo Donggo (brother)
- Mambora ba Pili Tuta (son)
- Tureli Nggampo (son of Mawaä Bilmana)
- Mawaä Ndapa (son of Manggampo Donggo)
- Ruma Samara (son)
- Ruma Sarise (brother)
- Ruma Mantau Asi Sawo (brother)
- Ruma Manuru Sarei (brother)
- Tureli Nggampo
- Mambora di Sapega (son of Mambora ba Pili Tuta)
- Mantau Asi Peka (son of Mawaä Ndapa)

=== Sultans of Bima ===
The list of sultans of Bima:

- Abdul Kahir (son of Ruma Mantau Asi Sawo) c. 1620-1640
- Ambela Abu'l-Khair Sirajuddin (son) 1640-1682
- Nuruddin Abubakar Ali Syah (son) 1682-1687
- Jamaluddin Ali Syah (son) 1687-1696
- Hasanuddin Muhammad Ali Syah (son) 1697-1731
- Alauddin Muhammad Syah (son) 1731-1748
- Kamalat Syah (daughter) 1748-1751
- Abdul Kadim Muhammad Syah (brother) 1751-1773
- Abdul Hamid Muhammad Syah (son) 1773-1817
- Ismail Muhammad Syah (son) 1817-1854
- Abdullah (son) 1854-1868
- Abdul Aziz (son) 1868-1881
- Ibrahim (brother) 1881-1915
- Muhammad Salahuddin (son) 1915-1951

=== Territorial heads of Bima ===
The list of territorial heads of Bima:

- Abdul Kahir (son) territorial head 1954-1957

== Family tree ==
Family tree of Bima Sultans

Bima Kingdom
Indera Jambrut^{(1)}
Batara; Indera Bima^{(2)}
Batara; Sang Luka^{(3)}
Batara; Sang Bima^{(4)}
Batara Matra; Indarwata^{(5)}	Batara Matra; Inderatarati^{(6)}
Manggampo; Jawa^{(7)}	Puteri; Ratna Lila^{(8)}	Maharaja; Indera Kumala^{(9)}
Batara; Indera Luka^{(10)}
Maharaja; Bima Indera; Seri^{(11)}
Mawa'a Paju; Longge^{(12)}	Mawa'a; Indera Mbojo^{(13)}	Mawa'a; Bilmana^{(14)}	Manggampo; Donggo^{(15)}
Tureli; Nggampo^{(17)}	Mambora Ba; Pili Tuta^{(16)}	Mawa'a; Ndapa^{(18)}
Mambora Di; Sapega^{(23)}	Ruma Samara^{(19)}	Ruma Sarise^{(20)}	Ruma Mantau; Asi Sawo^{(21)}	Ruma Manuru; Sarei^{(22)}	Mantau; Asi Peka^{(24)}
Bima Sultanate
Abdul Kahir I^{(25)} r. 1620-1640
Ambela; Abul Khair; Sirajuddin^{(26)} r. 1640-1682
Nuruddin; Abubakar; Ali Syah^{(27)} r. 1682-1687
Jamaluddin; Ali Syah^{(28)} r. 1687-1696
Hasanuddin; Muhammad; Ali Syah^{(29)} r. 1697-1731
Alauddin; Muhammad; Syah^{(30)} r. 1731-1748
Kamalat Syah^{(31)} r. 1748-1751	Abdul Kadim; Muhammad; Syah^{(32)} r. 1751-1773
Abdul Hamid; Muhammad; Syah^{(33)} r. 1773-1817
Ismail; Muhammad; Syah^{(34)} r. 1817-1854
Abdullah^{(35)} r. 1854-1868
Abdul Aziz^{(36)} r. 1868-1881	Ibrahim^{(37)} r. 1881-1915
Muhammad; Salahuddin^{(38)} r. 1915-1951
Abdul Kahir II^{(39)} Head of House r. 1954-1957
