= Sanggar Bay =

Coordinates: 8°17′S 118°18′E

Sanggar Bay (Indonesian: Teluk Sanggar) is a major bay on the island of Sumbawa, southwest of the Sanggar Peninsula and Mount Tambora.
