= Woha, Sumbawa =

Woha
- Msp of Bima Regency

- Location of Woha in West Nusa Tenggara, Indonesia
- Coordinates: 08°35′19″S 118°39′37″E
- Country: Indonesia
- Province: West Nusa Tenggara
- Regency: Bima Regency
- Established: April 10, 2002

Area
  - Total: 105.57 km^{2} (40.76 sq mi)

Population (mid 2023 estimate)
  - Total: 53,378
  - Density: 505.62/km^{2} (1,309.5/sq mi)
- Time zone: UTC+8

Woha is an administrative district (kecamatan) which serves as the capital of the Bima Regency, on the eastern part of the island of Sumbawa, in the Indonesian province of West Nusa Tenggara. It is connected by provincial road to the towns of Bima and Sape.

== Geography ==
The district is located on the eastern part of the Sumbawa island.

== Administration ==
The town is divided into fifteen administrative villages (desa) - Dadibou, Donggobolo, Kalampa, Keli, Naru, Nisa, Pandai, Penapali, Rabakodo, Risa, Samili, Talabiu, Tenga, Tente and Waduwani.

== Sister Towns ==
Kulim, Malaysia
