= Parado =

- District
- Interactive map of Parado
- Coordinates: 8°45′19″S 118°34′09″E
- Country: Indonesia
- Province: West Nusa Tenggara
- Regency: Bima

Parado is a district in Bima Regency, West Nusa Tenggara, Indonesia.

== Archeology ==
Parado, located in Bima Regency, West Nusa Tenggara, is known as one of the areas that has important megalithic remains. These remains are in the form of dolmens, menhirs, and stone graves, which were used by prehistoric people for various purposes, such as religious rituals, social status symbols, or burials. These remains reflect the cultural traditions and spirituality of past people in Parado, as well as being important historical evidence of the development of life in the area during the megalithic era.
