= Sumbawa =

Island in Indonesia

Native name: Samawa (Sumbawa); ᨔᨆᨓ (Satera Jontal script); Sombawa (Bima); Nickname: Tana Intan Bulaeng "Land of the Shining Diamonds"
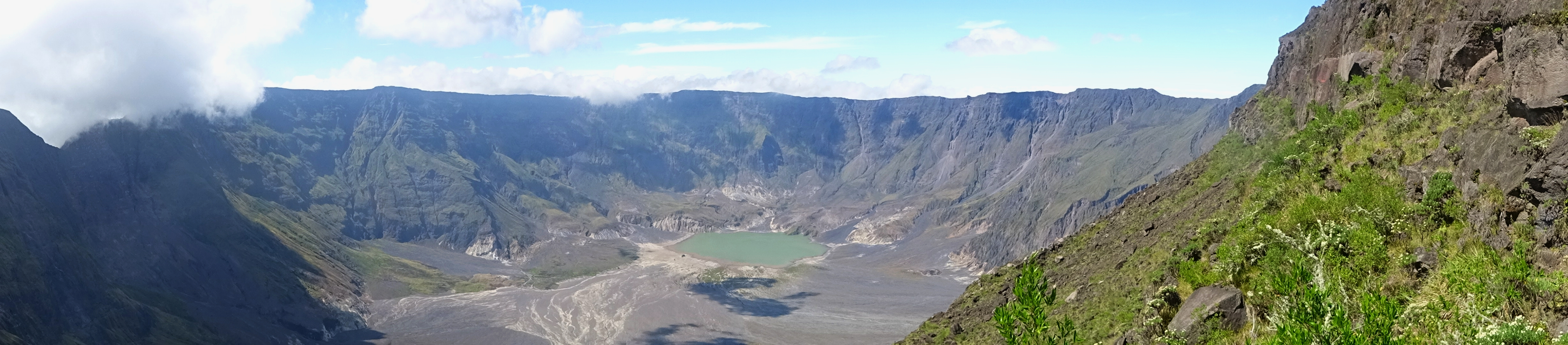
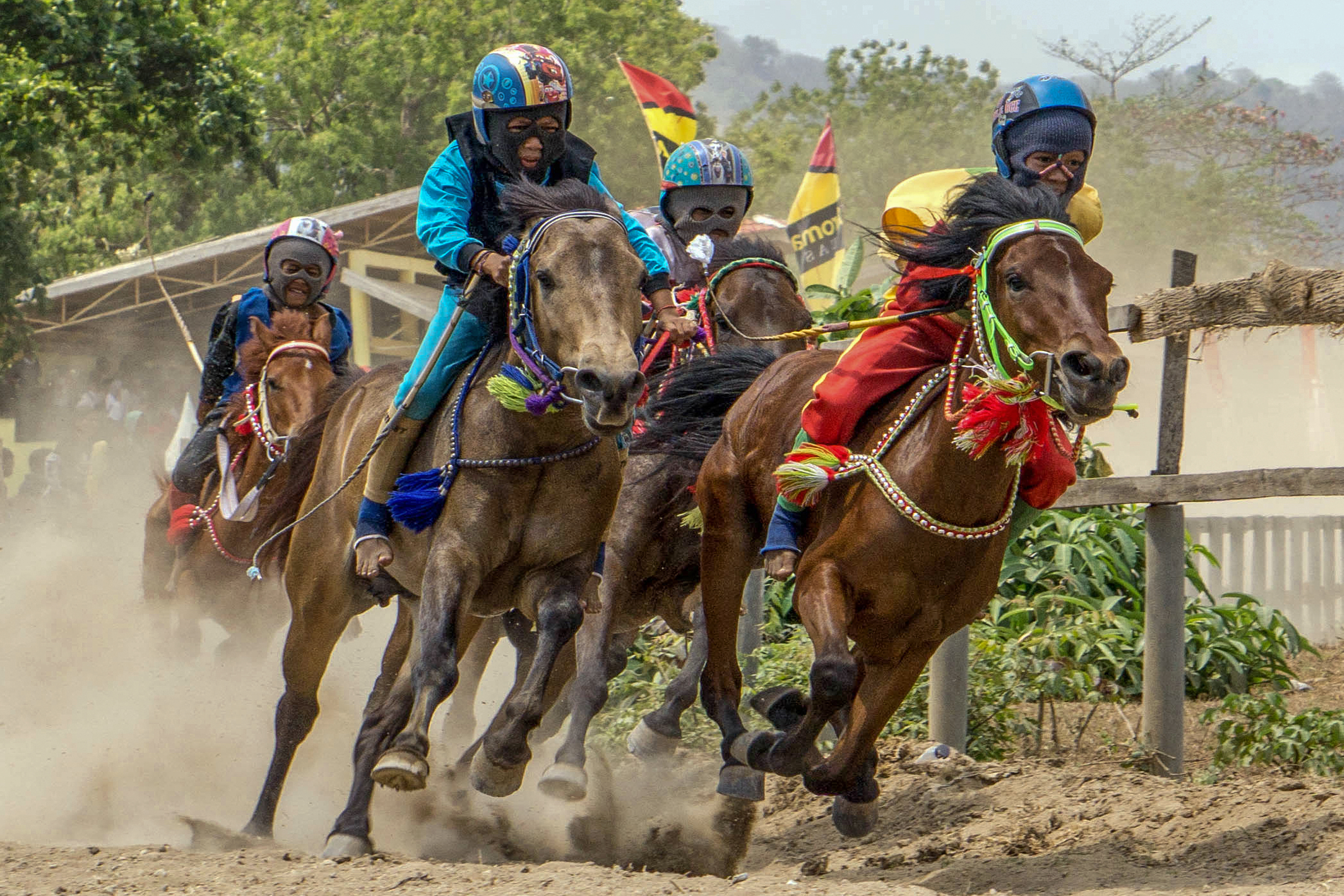
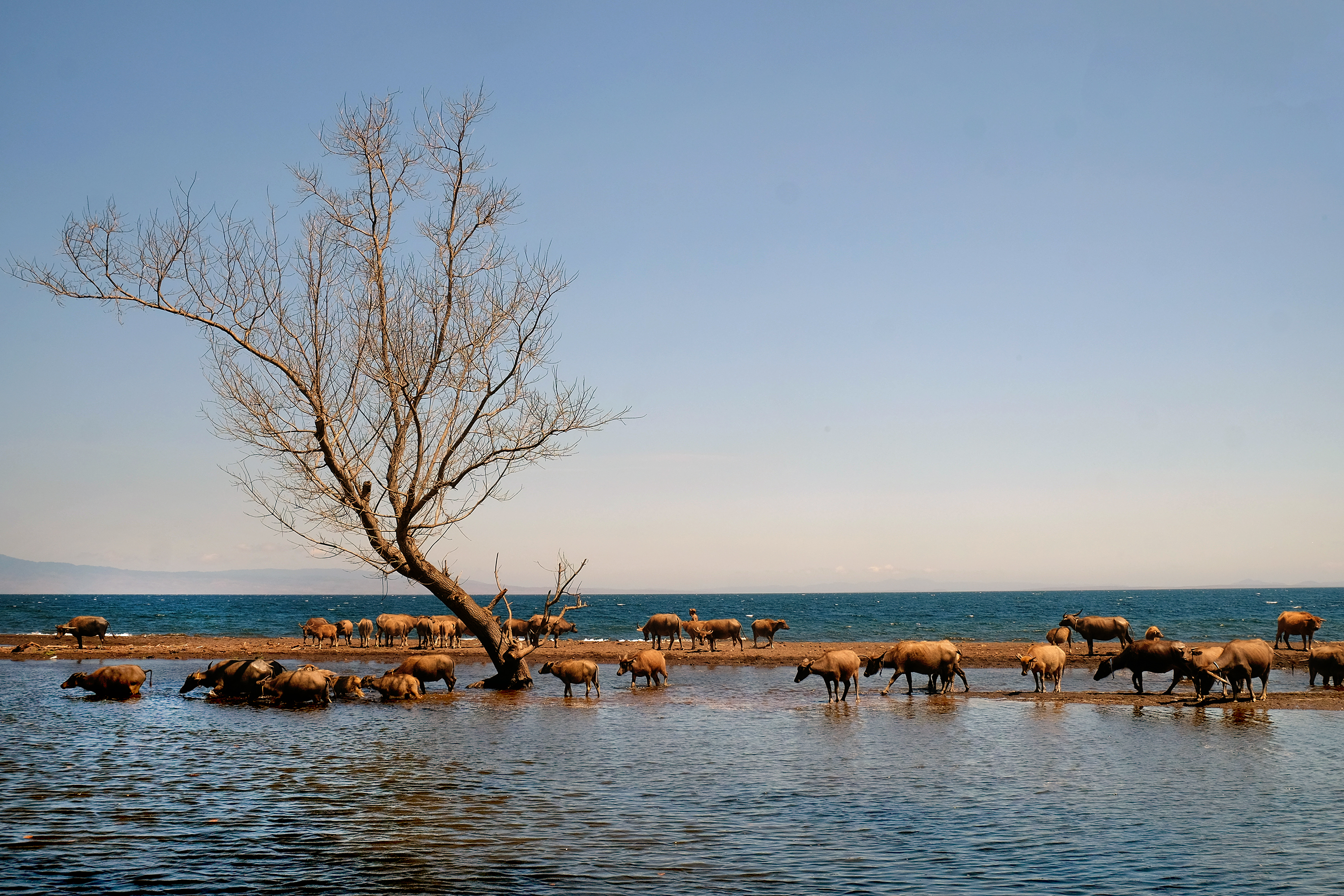
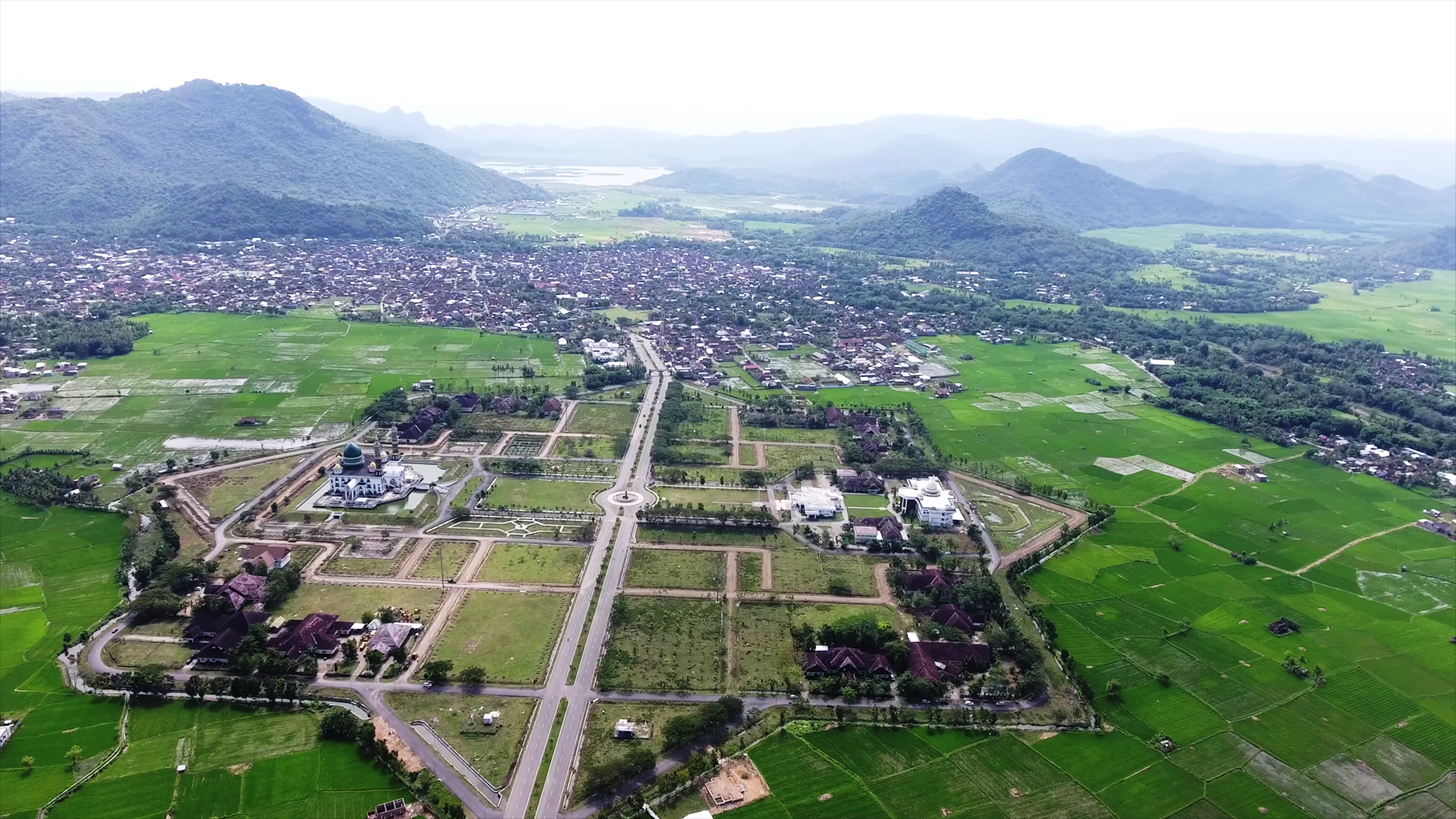
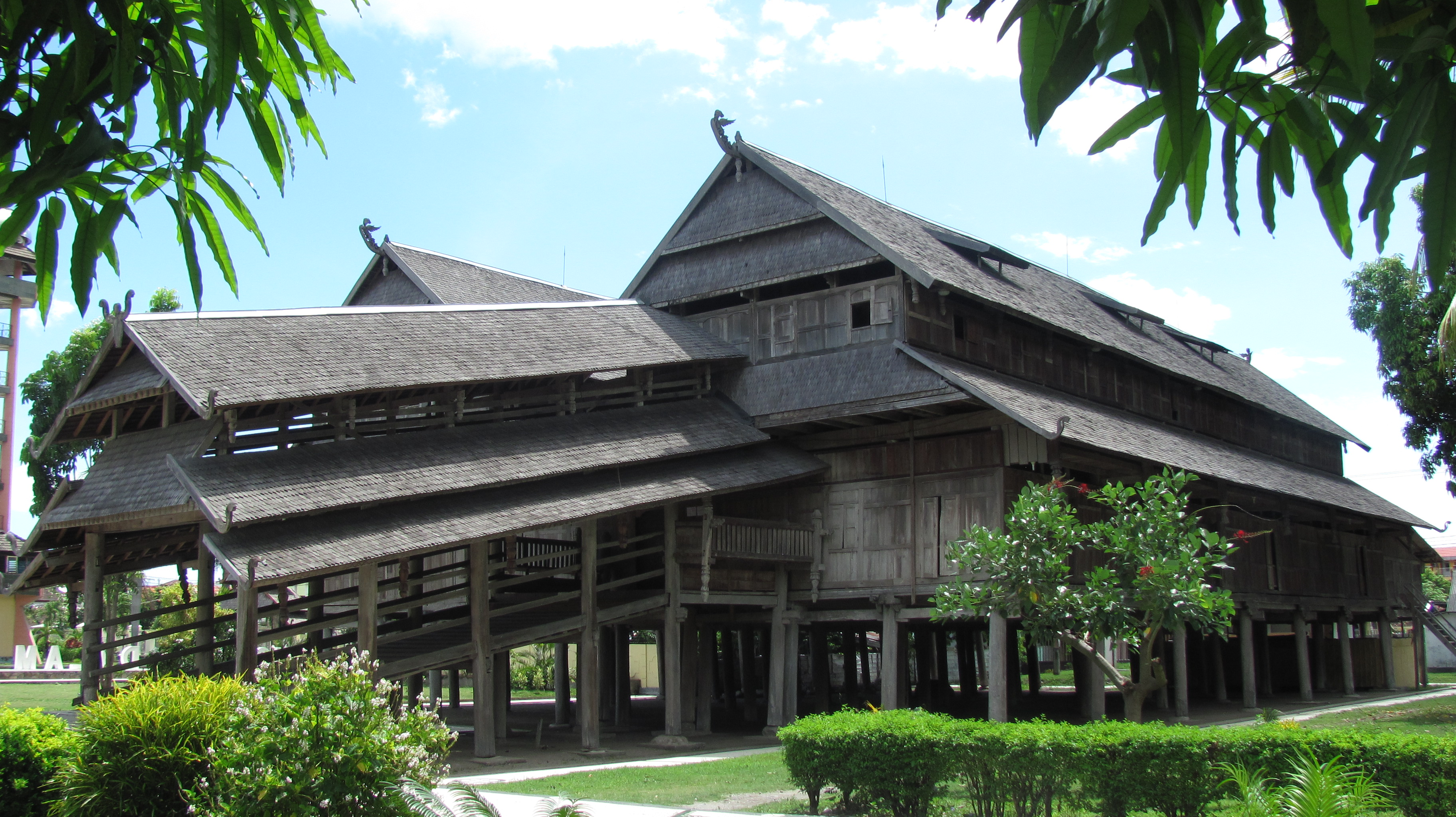
- From top, left to right: The caldera of Mount Tambora, traditional Pacoa Jara, Hodo beach, Kemutar Telu Center, and Dalam Loka Palace

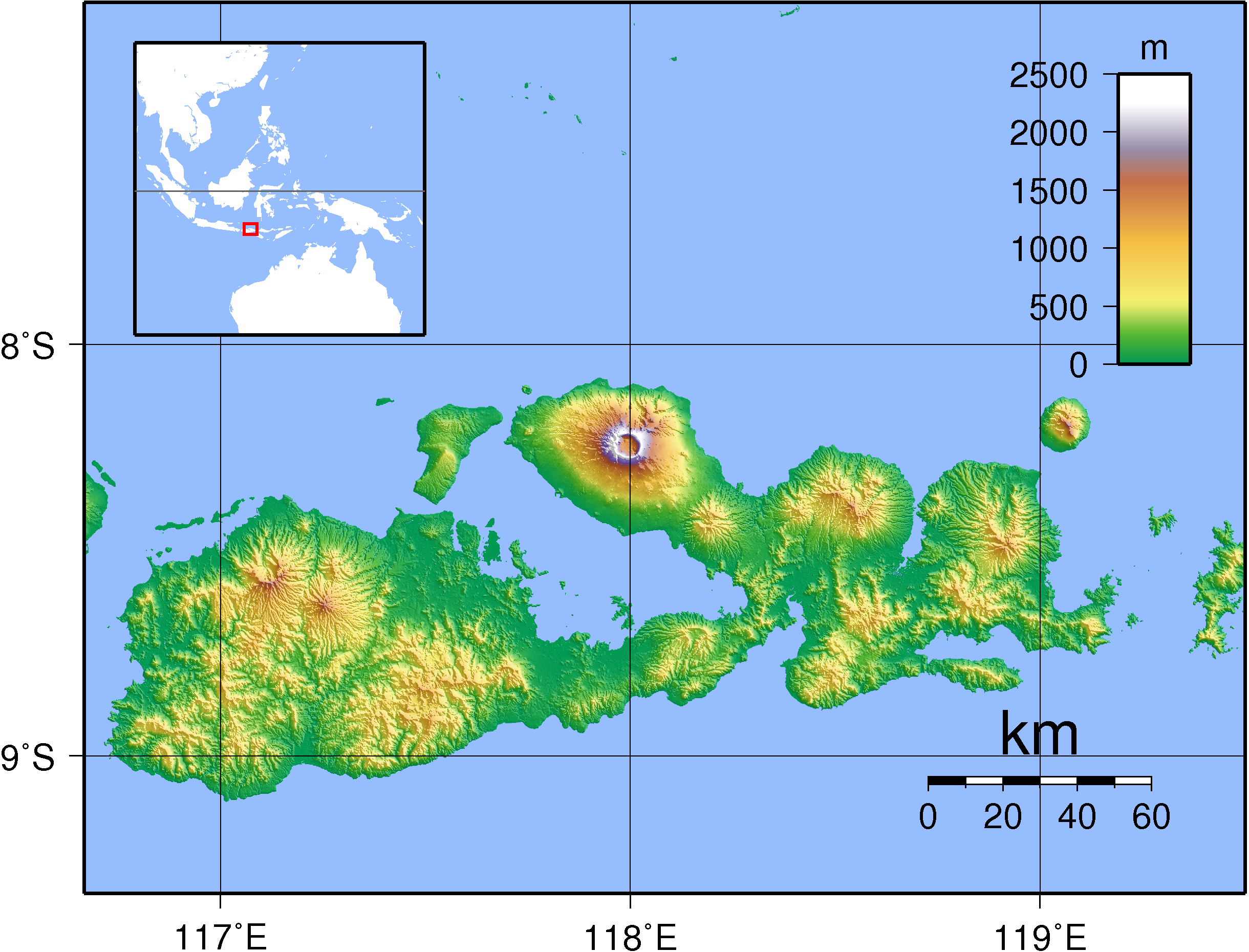
- Topography of Sumbawa

- Location of Sumbawa in Indonesia

Geography
- Location: Southeast Asia
- Coordinates: 8°47′S 118°5′E
- Archipelago: Lesser Sunda Islands
- Area: 15,448 km^{2} (5,965 sq mi)
- Area rank: 57th
- Highest elevation: 2,850 m (9350 ft)
- Highest point: Tambora

Administration
- Indonesia
- Province: West Nusa Tenggara
- Regencies: Sumbawa; Dompu; Bima; West Sumbawa
- Largest settlement: Bima (pop. 165,800)

Demographics
- Demonym: Sumbawa Islander
- Population: 1,673,700 (mid 2025 estimate)
- Population rank: 45th
- Pop. density: 109.2/km^{2} (282.8/sq mi)
- Languages: Indonesian; Sumbawa; Bima; Sasak; Balinese; Javanese; Sundanese; Bugis; Madurese
- Ethnic groups: Bimanese; Sumbawans; Dompuan; Sasak; Balinese; Javanese; Sundanese; Bugis; Madurese

Additional information
- Time zone: Central Indonesian Time (UTC+8)

Sumbawa (Note: English: /suːmˈbɑːwə/ soom-BAH-wə Indonesian pronunciation: [sʊmˈbawa] In the native regional languages of Sumbawa: Sumbawa: Samawa, pronounced [saˈma.wa]; Sumbawa: ᨔᨆᨓ (Satera Jontal script), pronounced [saˈma.wa]; Bima: Sombawa, pronounced [somˈba.wa]) is an Indonesian island, located in the middle of the Lesser Sunda Islands chain, with Lombok to the west, Flores to the east, and Sumba further to the southeast. Along with Lombok, it forms the province of West Nusa Tenggara, but there have been plans (currently held in abeyance) by the Indonesian government to split the island off into a separate province. Traditionally, the island is known as the source of sappanwood, as well as honey and sandalwood. Its savanna-like climate and vast grasslands are used to breed horses and cattle, as well as to hunt deer.

Sumbawa has an area of 15,448 square kilometres or 5,965 square miles (three times the size of Lombok) with a population (at the 2020 Census) of 1,561,461; the official estimate as at mid 2025 was 1,673,700. It marks the boundary between the islands to the west, which were influenced by religion and culture spreading from India, and the region to the east which was less influenced. In particular, this applies to both Hinduism and Islam. While the name "Sumbawa" is used by outsiders for the whole island, locally the term is only applied to the western half (Sumbawa and West Sumbawa Regencies), while the eastern half is referred to by inhabitants as "Bima" (meaning the city as well as Bima and Dompu Regencies), as the two parts of the island are divided by geography, culture and language.

== Etymology ==
Sumbawa come from Portuguese Cumbava or Cimbava, assimilated from the locally used name Sambawa (still found as such in Makassarese, cf. also Semawa in the Sumbawa language). This name is probably derived from Sanskrit śāmbhawa, meaning 'related to Śambhu (शम्भु 'the Benevolent', a name for Shiva)'.

== History ==
The 14th-century Nagarakretagama mentioned several principalities identified to be on eastern Sumbawa; Dompu, Bima, Sape, and one on the Sangeang Api island just off the coast of northeast Sumbawa. Four principalities in western Sumbawa were dependencies of the Majapahit Empire of eastern Java. Because of Sumbawa's natural resources, it was regularly invaded by outside forces – from the Javanese, Balinese, and Makassar, to the Dutch and Japanese. The Dutch first arrived in 1605 but did not effectively rule Sumbawa until the early 20th century.

For a short period, the Balinese kingdom of Gelgel ruled a part of western Sumbawa. The eastern and central parts of the island were traditionally divided into four sultanates: Sumbawa, Sanggau, Dompo, and Bima, which had links to the Bugis and Makassar peoples of South Sulawesi.

Historical evidence indicates that people on Sumbawa island were known in the East Indies for their honey, horses, sappanwood, which is used to make red dye, and sandalwood, which is used for incense and medications. The area was thought to be highly productive agriculturally. In the 18th century, the Dutch introduced coffee plantations on the western slopes of Mount Tambora, a volcano on the north side of Sumbawa, thus creating the Tambora coffee variant.

Tambora's colossal eruption in 1815 was the most powerful in recorded history, ejecting 180 cubic kilometres (43 cu mi) of ash and debris into the atmosphere. The eruption killed up to 71,000 people and triggered a period of global cooling known as the "Year Without a Summer" in 1816. It also apparently destroyed a culture of Papuan affinity, known to archaeologists as the "Tambora culture".

== Administration ==
Sumbawa is administratively divided into four regencies (kabupaten) and one kota (city). The regencies and cities are listed below with their administrative capitals, their areas, and their populations at the 2010 census and the 2020 census, together with the official estimates as of mid 2025.

Kode Wilayah	Name of City or Regency	Capital	Area in km^{2}	Pop'n 2010 census	Pop'n 2020 census	Pop'n mid 2025 estimate	HDI 2014 estimates
52.04	Sumbawa Regency	Sumbawa Besar	6,643.99	415,789	509,753	543,700	0.628 (Medium)
52.05	Dompu Regency	Dompu	2,324.55	218,973	236,665	254,700	0.635 (Medium)
52.06	Bima Regency	Woha	4,389.40	439,228	514,105	551,400	0.626 (Medium)
52.07	West Sumbawa Regency (Sumbawa Barat)	Taliwang	1,743.58	114,951	145,798	158,100	0.671 (Medium)
52.72	Bima City	Bima	222.25	142,579	155,140	165,800	0.722 (High)
	Total Sumbawa		15,323.77	1,331,520	1,561,461	1,673,700	

Proposals have been under consideration since 2013 by the People's Representative Council (Dewan Perwakilan Rakyat or DPR) to create a separate Sumbawa Island province; there is no information as to whether the remaining part of the present province (i.e. the districts comprising Lombok Island) would then be renamed. However, since 2013 the Indonesian Government have maintained a moratorium on the intended creation of new provinces, regencies and cities.

== Demographics ==
Islam, the dominant faith of the island, was introduced by the Makassarese of Sulawesi.

Sumbawa had, historically speaking, three major linguistic groups who spoke languages that were unintelligible to each other. The Sumbawa people centered on the western side of the island speak Basa Semawa (Indonesian: Bahasa Sumbawa) which is similar to the Sasak language from nearby Lombok; the Bima people in the east speak Nggahi Mbojo (Bahasa Bima), which is closer to the languages spoken on Flores and Sumba. They were once separated by the Tambora culture, which spoke a language related to neither. After the demise of Tambora due to the 1815 eruption, local kingdoms based in Sumbawa Besar and Bima became the two focal points of Sumbawa. This division of the island into two parts remains today; Sumbawa Besar and Bima are the two largest towns on the island (although the town of Dompu to the west of Bima has a greater urban area population than Sumbawa Besar), and are the centers of distinct cultural groups that share the island. The Don Donggo or "Mountain People" are a small minority ethnic group who occupy the cloudy highlands west of Bima Bay.

The population of the island (including minor outlying islands) was 1.56 million at the latest decennial census in 2020, comprising 29.46% of the population of the entire Province of West Nusa Tenggara's 5.32 million people; the official estimate as at mid 2025 was 1,673,000 - of whom 701,800 inhabit the western half and 971,900 the eastern half of the island.

Due to the lack of work opportunities on the island and its frequent droughts, many people on the island seek work in the Middle East as laborers or domestic servants; some 500,000 workers, or over 10% of the population of West Nusa Tenggara, have left the country to work overseas such as China and Singapore.

== Geography ==
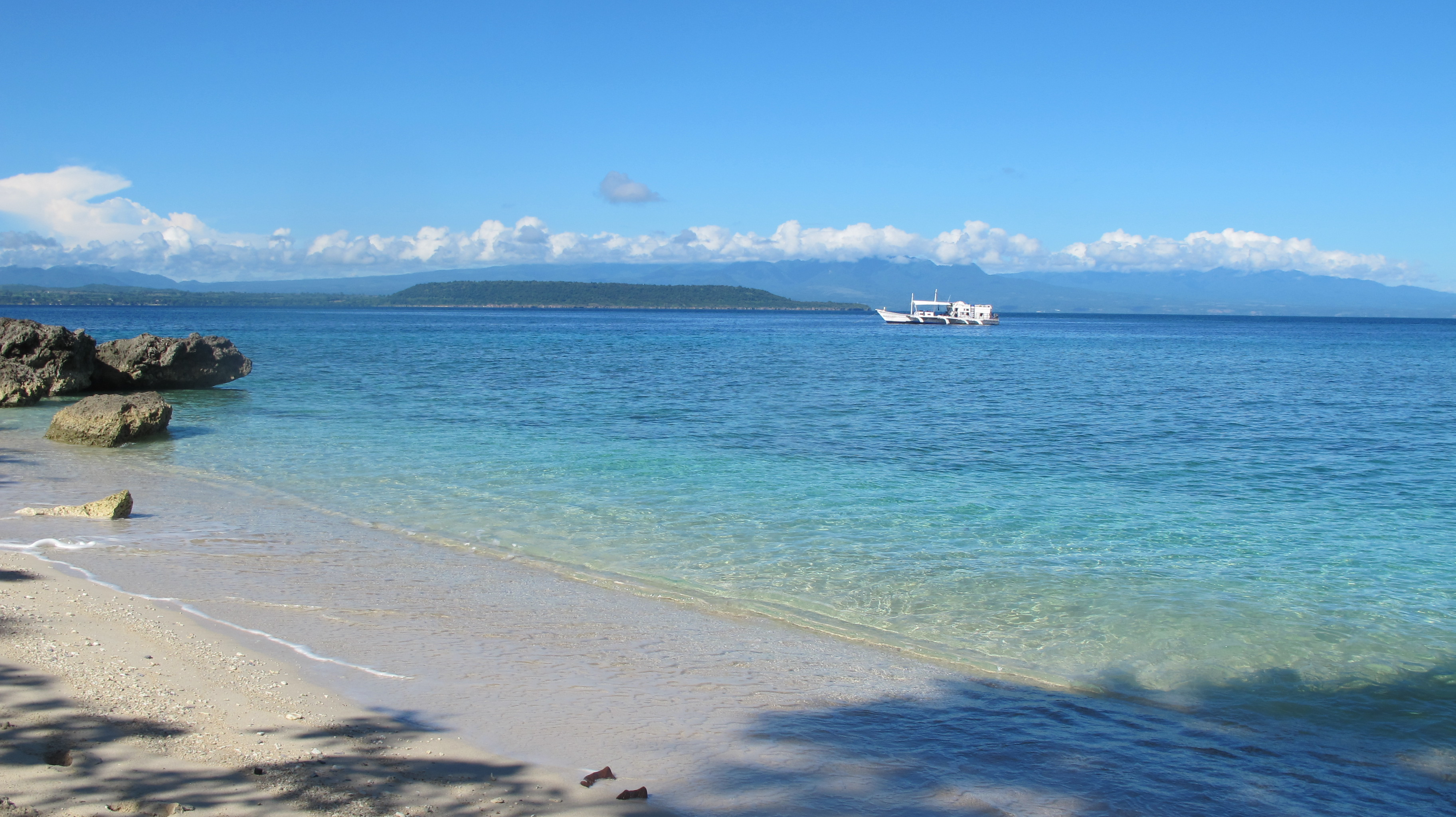
Beach on Moyo Island, North Sumbawa in March 2012

The island is bounded by bodies of water on all sides; to the west is the Alas Strait, which separates it from Lombok; to the south is the Indian Ocean, with Cempi Bay and Waworada Bay providing major indentations along the south coast; the Sape Strait lies to the east of the island and separates Sumbawa from Flores and the Komodo Islands; the Flores Sea runs the length of the northern coastline, where Saleh Bay creates a major north-central indentation in the island, almost cutting the island in two parts, and other inlets include most notably Bima Bay.

Sumbawa's most distinguishing features are Saleh Bay and the Sanggar Peninsula. On the latter stands Mount Tambora (8°14’41” S, 117°59’35” E), a large stratovolcano famous for its VEI 7 eruption in 1815, one of only a few eruptions of such magnitude in the last 2,000 years. The eruption obliterated most of Tambora's summit, reducing its height by about a third and leaving a six-kilometer-wide caldera. Regardless, Tambora remains the highest point on the island. Highlands rise in four spots on the island, as well as on Sangeang Island. The large western lobe of Sumbawa is dominated by a large central highland, and Tambora, Dompu, and Bima each have more minor highlands.

There are several large surrounding islands, most notably Moyo Island, volcanically active Sangeang Island, and the touristic Komodo Islands (administered under East Nusa Tenggara Province) to the east.

Sumbawa is part of the Lesser Sunda deciduous forests ecoregion.

=== List of offshore islands ===
There are several smaller offshore islands which fall within the regencies based on Sumbawa Island:

- West Sumbawa Regency
  - Susait
  - Dua
  - Belang
  - Songi
  - Ular
  - Kenawa
  - Natano
- Sumbawa Besar Regency
  - Panjang Island
  - Saringi
  - Kemudang
  - Ayer Tawat
  - Romo
  - Medang Island
- Saleh Bay, Sumbawa Besar Regency
  - Moyo Island
  - Dangar Besar
  - Liang
  - Ngali
  - Tengar
  - Kelapang
  - Dompo
  - Takebo
  - Paming
  - Lipa
  - Rakit
- Dompu Regency
  - P. Besar
  - P. Nisa Pudu
  - P. Nisa Rate
- Bima Regency, Tambora Peninsula exclave
  - Satonda Island
- Bima Regency
  - Sangeang Island
  - Sanai Island
  - Matagate Island
  - Banta Island

== Economy ==
We want to say that there has been a decline, but a slow decline. There is no seriousness from the government. (About around 20 children died from malnutrition in Sumbawa in October 2012) —Ida, Alliance of Prosperous Villages (ADS)

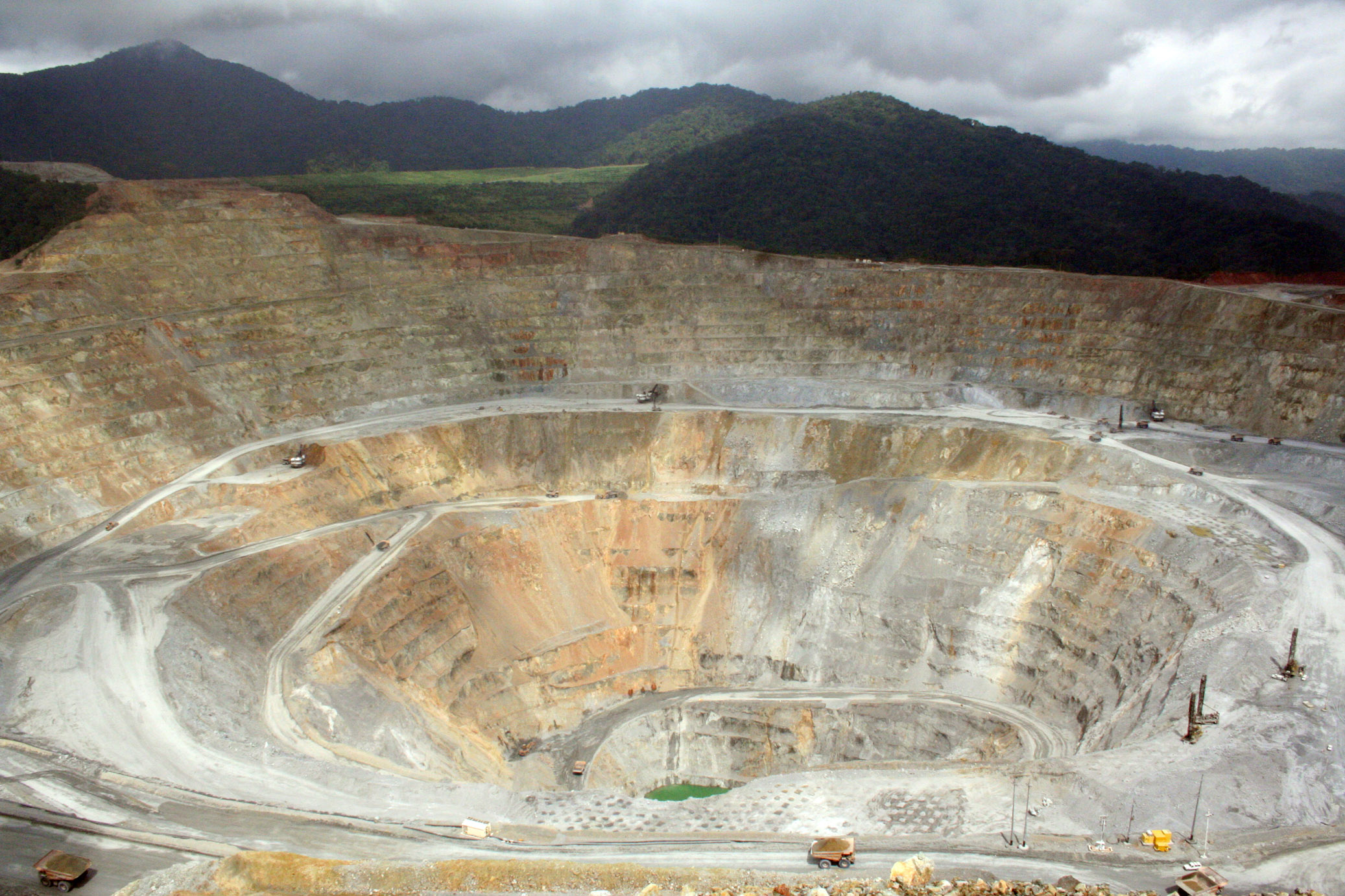
Batu Hijau mine, 2006

Many of the island residents are at risk of starvation when crops fail due to lack of rainfall. The majority of the population works in agriculture. Tourism is just beginning, with a few surf spots renowned for being world-class, Jelenga and Supersuck Beaches near the mine, as well as Hu'u and Lakey Beach in the Gulf of Cempi.

=== Newmont Mine ===
A large gold and copper mine, Newmont Mining Corporation's Batu Hijau mine began commercial operations in 2000, a decade after the copper and gold were discovered. Newmont holds a 45% stake in the operation through its shareholding in PT Newmont Nusa Tenggara. A local unit of Japan's Sumitomo Corporation has a 35% share. The mine is located in southwest Sumbawa.

Due to the mine, Sumbawa Barat Regency along with other remote mining towns, and Jakarta, has the highest GDP per capita rates in Indonesia, Sumbawa Barat's is 156.25 million rupiah (US$17,170) as of 2010, Newmont and its partners have invested about $1.9 billion in the mine. The reserves are expected to last until 2034, making Batu Hijau one of the largest copper mines in the world.
It is also one of the worst water-polluting mines, notably with at least three pipe breaks since its opening in 1999.

Another important deposit of gold and copper has been discovered in 2020 near Onto. PT Sumbawa Timur Mining (STM) hopes to start exploitation in 2030.

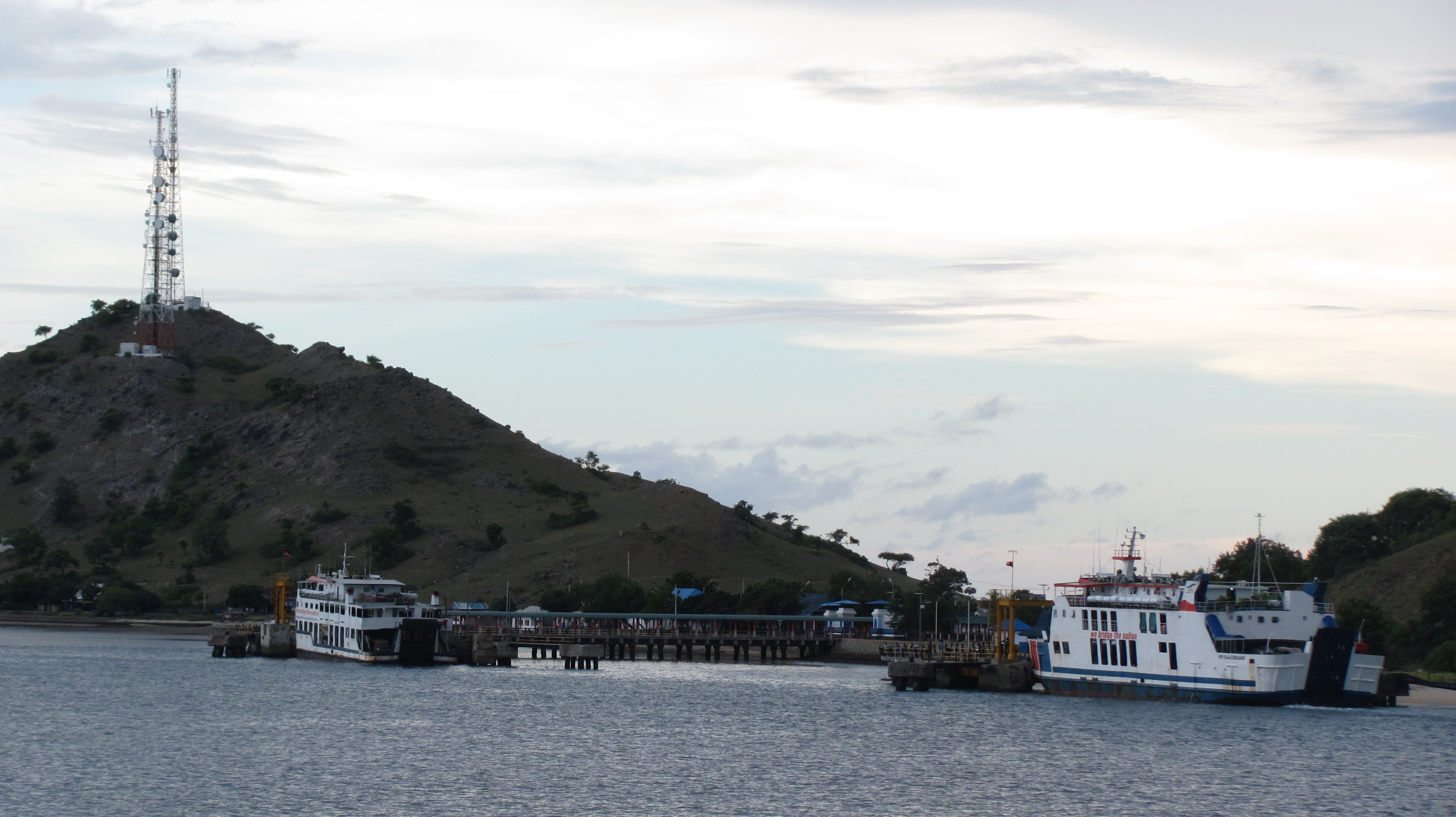
Harbour of Poto Tano

== Transport ==
There is a road network in Sumbawa, but it is poorly maintained and has long portions of rough gravel. Frequent ferry service to Sumbawa (Poto Tano) from Lombok (Labuhan Lombok) exists; however, the ferry service to Flores from Sape is infrequent. Bima is the largest city on Sumbawa and has ferry and bus services directly to Java and Bali, though service breakdowns are common.

The most convenient way to reach Sumbawa is via air. Commercial flights connect the island's main airport, the Bima Airport, to Denpasar and Makassar.
