= Bima Regency =

Regency in West Nusa Tenggara, Indonesia

Bima Regency Kabupaten Bima Mbojo
- Regency
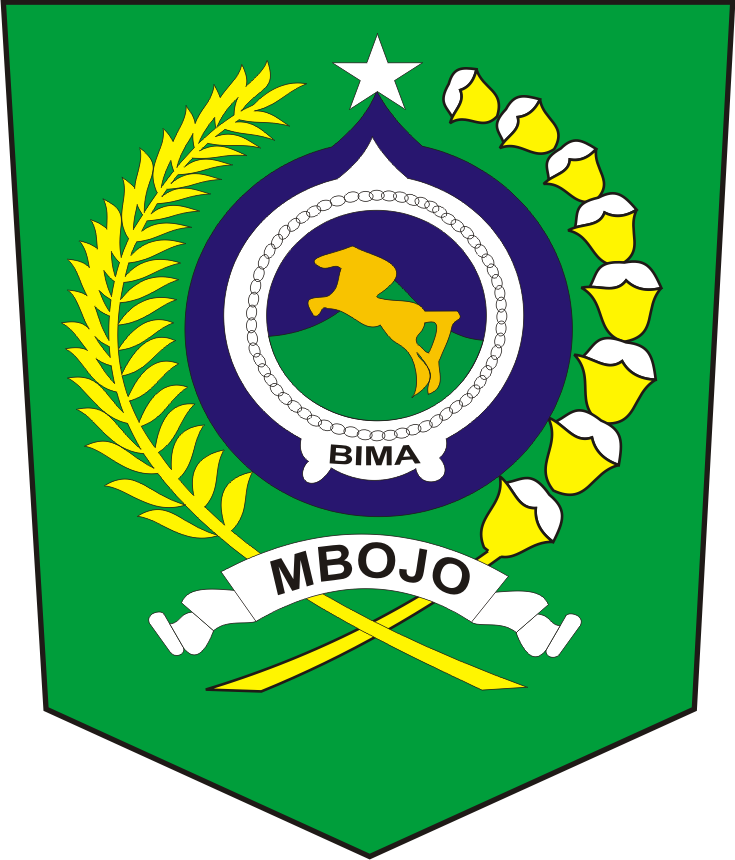
- Coat of arms

- Location within West Nusa Tenggara

- Location in Lesser Sunda Islands and Indonesia Bima Regency (Indonesia)
- Coordinates: 8°34′28″S 119°2′15″E
- Country: Indonesia
- Province: West Nusa Tenggara
- Capital: Woha

Government
  - Regent: Ady Mahyudi
  - Vice Regent: Irfan Zubaidy

Area
  - Total: 4,218.63 km^{2} (1,628.82 sq mi)

Population (mid 2025 estimate)
  - Total: 551,382
  - Density: 130.702/km^{2} (338.516/sq mi)
- Time zone: UTC+8 (ICST)
- Area code: (+62) 374
- Website: bimakab.go.id

Bima Regency is a regency (Indonesian: Kabupaten Bima) of the Indonesian Province of West Nusa Tenggara. It is located on the island of Sumbawa and the capital is Woha. The Regency covers an area of 4,218.63 km^{2}, and had a population of 438,522 at the 2010 Census and 514,105 at the 2020 Census; the official estimate as at mid 2025 was 551,382 (comprising 273,256 males and 272,315 females in 2024). It administratively excludes but geographically completely surrounds Bima City on the landward side.

It has two non-contiguous parts, which are separated by the northeastern coastal portion of Dompu Regency. The larger eastern half of Bima Regency covers the easternmost quarter of the island (excluding Bima City), and comprises sixteen districts. This includes two substantial offshore islands (Sangeang Island to the northeast of Sumbawa and Banta Island to the east) and 89 smaller islands. The smaller western part of Bima Regency covers the northern half of the Sanggar Peninsula, which is dominated by Mount Tambora, and comprises Sanggar District and Tambora District; to the north-east of this part is Sanggar Bay. Five bodies of water border the regency - Bima Bay and the Flores Sea to the north, the Sumba Strait and Waworada Bay to the south, and Sape Strait to the east.

The Regency is nearly coterminous with the former Sultanate of Bima and includes the nearby islands of Sangeang, Banta, Managate and Kelapa. The island of Kambing, which lies in Bima Bay, is also part of the Regency.

== Demography ==
Of the total population of 545,571 in mid 2025, 129,885 (23.81%) were below the age of 15, and 415,686 were aged 15 and above; of the latter, 370,568 (67.92%) were of working age and 45,118 (8.27%) were aged 65 and above.

== Administrative districts ==
Bima Regency consists of eighteen districts (kecamatan), tabulated below with their areas and their populations at the 2010 Census and the 2020 Census, together with the official estimates as at mid 2025. The table also includes the locations of the district administrative centres, the number of administrative villages (all classed as rural desa) and the number of offshore islands in each district, and its postal codes.

Kode Wilayah	Name of District (kecamatan)	Area in km^{2}	Pop'n 2010 Census	Pop'n 2020 Census	Pop'n mid 2025 Estimate	Admin centre	No. of villages	No. of islands	Post code
52.06.01	Monta	193.66	33,439	39,115	42,433	Tangga	14	6	84172
52.06.16	Parado	222.44	8,702	10,676	11,451	Paradorato	5	1	84170
52.06.02	Bolo	74.84	44,259	51,356	54,744	Rato	14	-	84161
52.06.13	Mada Pangga	252.17	27,385	31,453	33,513	Dena	11	-	84111
52.06.03	Woha	121.02	43,904	51,163	54,110	Tente	15	-	84171
52.06.04	Belo	60.05	24,940	27,572	29,718	Cenggu	9	-	84173
52.06.18	Palibelo	67.72	24,786	27,833	30,867	Teke	12	-	84174
52.06.05	Wawo	159.46	16,250	18,839	20,307	Marua	9	-	84184
52.06.11	Langgudu	315.13	26,292	31,468	33,428	Karumbu	15	13	84180
52.06.17	Lambitu	56.26	5,074	6,135	6,852	Kuta	6	-	84181
52.05.06	Sape ^{(a)}	213.30	53,064	61,008	65,022	Naru	18	34	84183
52.06.12	Lambu ^{(b)}	401.98	34,280	42,055	44,260	Sumi	14	26	84182
52.06.07	Wera ^{(c)}	463.59	28,032	32,479	35,294	Tawali	14	2	84152
52.06.10	Ambalawi	173.40	18,172	21,049	22,414	Nipa	6	-	84153
52.06.08	Donggo	124.80	16,753	19,955	21,448	O'o	9	-	84162
52.06.15	Soromandi	329.17	15,468	19,247	21,171	Kananta	7	1	84163
52.05.09	Sanggar	464.53	11,826	13,937	15,269	Kore	6	1	84191
52.06.14	Tambora	625.11	6,602	8,765	9,081	Labuhan Kananga	7	-	84190
	Totals	4,218.63	438,522	514,105	551,382	Woha	191	83	

Notes: (a) including Banta Island to the east of Sumbawa. (b) including Kelapa Island and Managate (or Kamara) Island to the east of Sumbawa. (c) including Sangeang Island to the northeast of Sumbawa. These three districts (Sape, Lambu and Wera) form the eastern part of Bima Regency, with a combined area (including offshore islands) of 1,078.87 km^{2} and 144,576 inhabitants in mid 2025.

== Sister District ==
- Kota Setar, Malaysia
