= Bima =

City in West Nusa Tenggara, Indonesia

Bima Mbojo (Bima)
- City
- City of Bima; Kota Bima
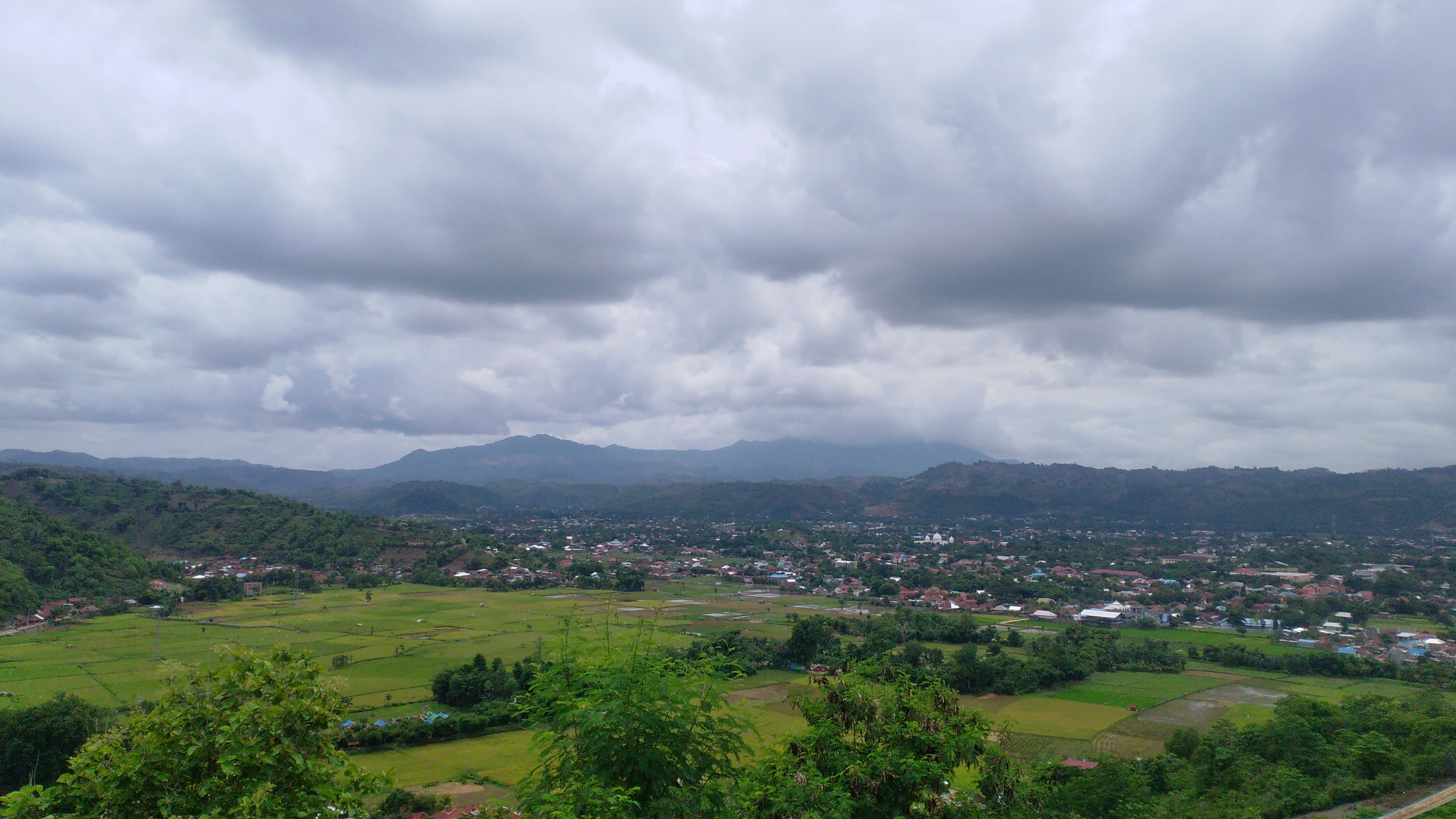
- Bima city view

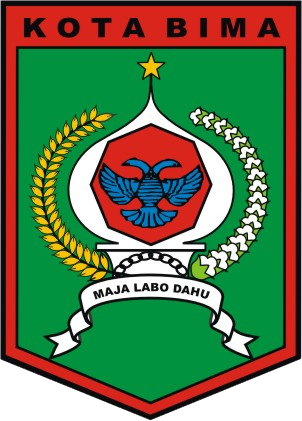
- Coat of arms
- Motto: Maja Labo Dahu (Bima) (Be Humble and Piety)
- Location within West Nusa Tenggara

- Location in Lesser Sunda Islands and Indonesia Bima (Indonesia)
- Coordinates: 08°27′36″S 118°43′36″E
- Country: Indonesia
- Province: West Nusa Tenggara
- Established: April 10, 2002

Government
  - Mayor: A. Rahman H. Abidin
  - Vice Mayor: Feri Sofiyan

Area
  - Total: 222.25 km^{2} (85.81 sq mi)

Population (mid 2025 estimate)
  - Total: 166,992
  - Density: 751.37/km^{2} (1,946.0/sq mi)
- Time zone: UTC+8 (Indonesia Central Time)
- Area code: (+62) 374
- Vehicle registration: EA
- Website: bimakota.go.id

Bima (pronounced [ˈbima]; Bima: Mbojo) is a coastal city on the east of the island of Sumbawa in Indonesia's province of West Nusa Tenggara. It is the largest city on the island of Sumbawa, with a population of 142,443 at the 2010 census and 155,140 at the 2020 census; the official estimate as at mid 2025 was 166,992 (comprising 83,288 males and 83,704 females). It is separate from (but surrounded on the landward side by) the adjoining Bima Regency which had a population of 545,571 according to the mid 2025 official estimates.

The people of Bima and the entire eastern side of Sumbawa speak the Bima language (Indonesia: Bahasa Bima; Bima: Nggahi Mbojo). From 1620 to 1958 it was the capital of the Bima Sultanate. In modern times, Bima city is the largest regional and economic hub of Eastern Sumbawa with transmigrants from other parts of Indonesia, especially Java, Bali, and Lombok. It has a central downtown commercial zone. It is home to the Sultan Salahuddin mosque and the Sultan Salahuddin Museum (former Bima Sultanate palace). It is connected by a provincial road to Dompu to the west and Sape to the east.

== Demography ==
Based on data for 2000, Bima had a population of 116,295 – comprising 57,108 males (49%) and 59,187 females (51%). There is uneven population distribution, with the densest population concentrated in the centers of economic activity and governance. The largest population was in the village of Paruga, which amounted to 12,275 people (11%) and the least was in the village of Kendo, with 1130 souls (1%). At the population census of 2010, the population in Bima numbered 142,443 (69,841 males and 72,602 females), and at the population census of 2020, the population in Bima numbered 155,140 (77,009 males and 78,131 females).

Of the total population of 166,992 in mid 2025, 42,963 (25.73%) were below the age of 15, and 124,029 were aged 15 and above; of the latter, 113,018 (67.68%) were of working age and 11,011 (6.59%) were aged 65 and above. The majority of the populace in Bima are Muslims, who form about 97.38%, and the rest are Protestant 0.89%, Catholic Christians 0.62%, and Hindus and Buddhists around 1.11%.

== Administrative districts ==
Bima City consists of five districts (kecamatan), tabulated below with their areas and their populations at the 2010 census and the 2020 census, together with the official estimates as of mid 2025. The table also includes the locations of the District administrative centres and the number of administrative villages (all rated as urban kelurahan) in each district, and its post codes.

Kode Wilayah	Name of District (kecamatan)	Area in km^{2}	Pop'n 2010 census	Pop'n 2020 census	Pop'n mid 2025 estimate	Admin centre	No. of villages	Post code
52.72.01	Rasanae Barat (West Rasanae)	10.14	31,126	30,435	31,080	Paruja	6	84111, 84116 - 84119
52.72.05	Mpunda	15.28	32,498	33,310	35,250	Lewirato	10	84111, 84112, 84115, 84119
52.72.02	Rasanae Timur (East Rasanae)	64.07	16,205	18,576	20,630	Kumbe	8	84114, 84119
52.72.04	Raba	63.73	34,845	38,553	41,390	Penaraga	11	84113, 84115, 84119
52.72.03	Asakota	69.03	27,905	34,266	38,650	Melayu	6	84119
	Totals	222.25	142,579	155,140	166,992	Raba	41	

== Geography ==
The city is located on the eastern shore of Bima Bay. Traditionally Bima was a port city that connected to other port cities in Eastern Indonesia such as Makassar and Ternate, as well as to ports in Lombok, Bali, and East Java.

== Climate ==
Bima has a tropical savanna climate (Köppen Aw) with moderate to little rainfall from April to November and heavy rainfall from December to March.

Climate data for Bima (1991–2020 normals)
Month	Jan	Feb	Mar	Apr	May	Jun	Jul	Aug	Sep	Oct	Nov	Dec	Year
Mean daily maximum °C (°F)	32.7 (90.9)	32.5 (90.5)	32.7 (90.9)	32.7 (90.9)	31.7 (89.1)	31.4 (88.5)	32.3 (90.1)	33.7 (92.7)	35.1 (95.2)	35.1 (95.2)	35.1 (95.2)	33.4 (92.1)	33.2 (91.8)
Daily mean °C (°F)	27.6 (81.7)	27.3 (81.1)	27.4 (81.3)	27.5 (81.5)	27.3 (81.1)	26.5 (79.7)	25.8 (78.4)	26.0 (78.8)	27.3 (81.1)	28.6 (83.5)	28.9 (84.0)	27.8 (82.0)	27.3 (81.2)
Mean daily minimum °C (°F)	24.6 (76.3)	24.4 (75.9)	24.3 (75.7)	24.1 (75.4)	23.7 (74.7)	22.5 (72.5)	22.0 (71.6)	21.5 (70.7)	22.6 (72.7)	24.1 (75.4)	24.8 (76.6)	24.9 (76.8)	23.6 (74.5)
Average precipitation mm (inches)	214.1 (8.43)	159.7 (6.29)	132.0 (5.20)	117.2 (4.61)	73.7 (2.90)	35.1 (1.38)	19.7 (0.78)	6.7 (0.26)	13.2 (0.52)	69.4 (2.73)	97.7 (3.85)	225.0 (8.86)	1,163.5 (45.81)
Average precipitation days (≥ 1.0 mm)	18.0	16.0	14.1	10.1	5.9	2.7	1.6	1.5	1.4	3.8	9.6	17.8	102.5
Source: Starlings Roost Weather

== Transportation ==
Bima is connected through the trans-Sumbawa road to Sape Harbour in the east and Dompu in the Southwest to Sumbawa Besar and Taliwang in the western part of Sumbawa. Bus services connecting Bima to other neighboring cities in Sumbawa as far as Mataram in Lombok are available. Air transportation is served through Sultan Muhammad Salahudin Airport on the southern outskirt of Bima by NAM Air and Wings Air to Lombok, Denpasar, and Makassar. Bima was also a stop on Qantas Airways' pre-war route between Sydney and Singapore, serviced by C Class Empire flying boats.

== History ==
In the Middle Ages, Bima was the easternmost extent of the expansion of Hinduism in Southeast Asia, as a result of heavy Indian influence on the region during the period.

Bima was once one of the four sultanates on the island of Sumbawa. From the 17th to 20th centuries, it was the capital of the Bima Sultanate and is home to an old palace of the city's rulers. In the early 17th century, the Islamization of Bima had fallen off the old Hindu kingdom on the east coast of the island of Sumbawa.

In 1792, Sultan Abdu'l Hamid Muhammad Shah signed a contract with the Dutch East India Company, through which Bima became the Protectorate of the Dutch.

== Tourism ==
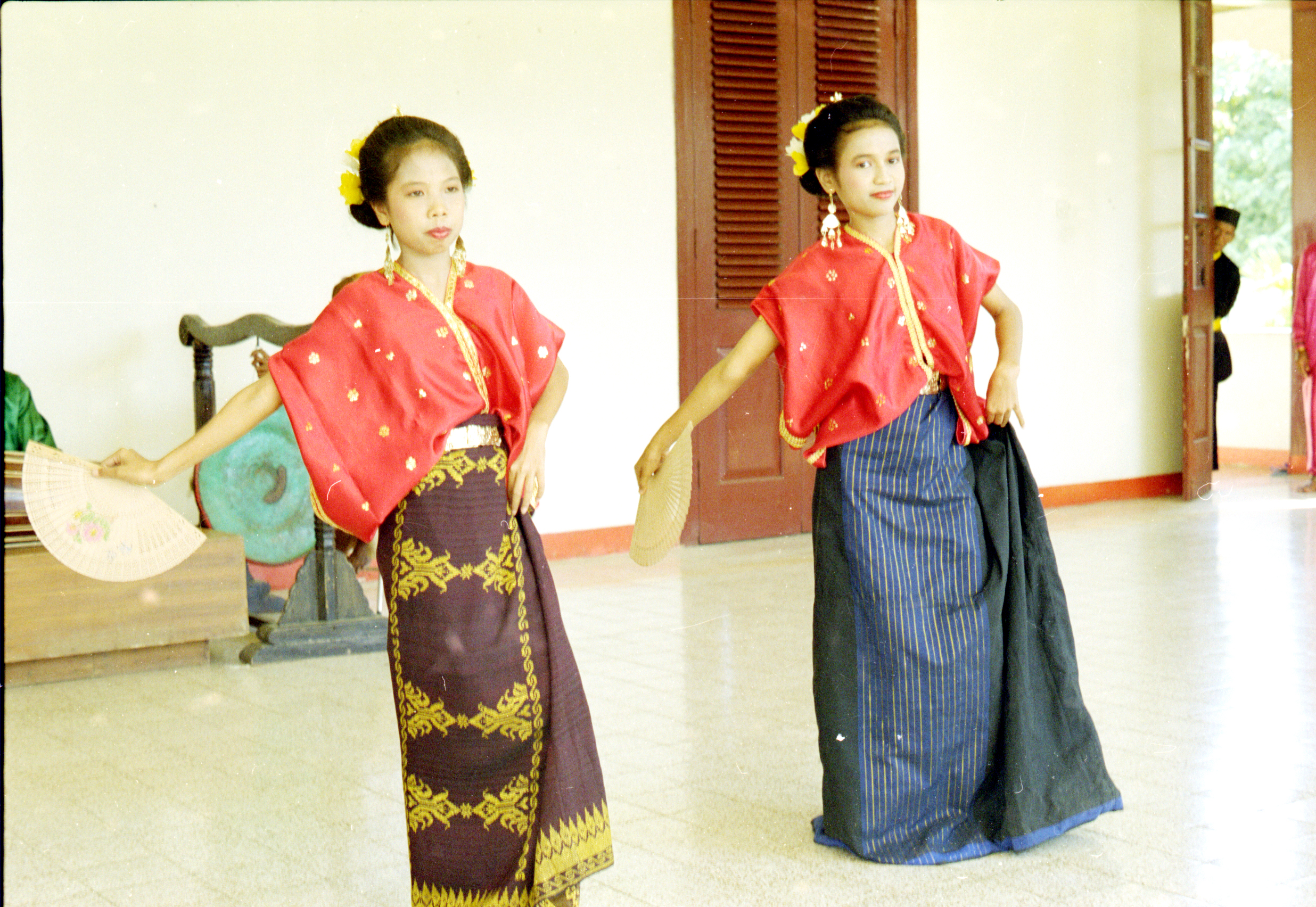
Dance can be seen in Sultan Palace as part of the attractions

Bima has several well-known tourist destinations, such as Mount Tambora, Wawo traditional Village, Sambori Traditional Village, Snake Island, Ana Fari Lake (Lake of the Angels), and Satonda Island. There are many white sandy beaches both in the northern and southern parts of Bima. The city has modest tourist accommodations, such as 1-star hotels and some restaurants. Its main attractions are the Sultan Salahuddin mosque, the Terapung mosque, and the Sultan Salahuddin Museum (former Bima Sultanate palace). Bima airport serves as the air hub for domestic and foreign visitors, who are more attracted to visiting Hu'u beach for surfing or Tambora Volcano for hiking.

== Sister cities ==
- Alor Setar, Malaysia
