= Sape Strait =

Strait in Indonesia

- Selat Sape (Indonesian)
- Northeast passage to the Sape Strait at northern tip of Komodo Island.

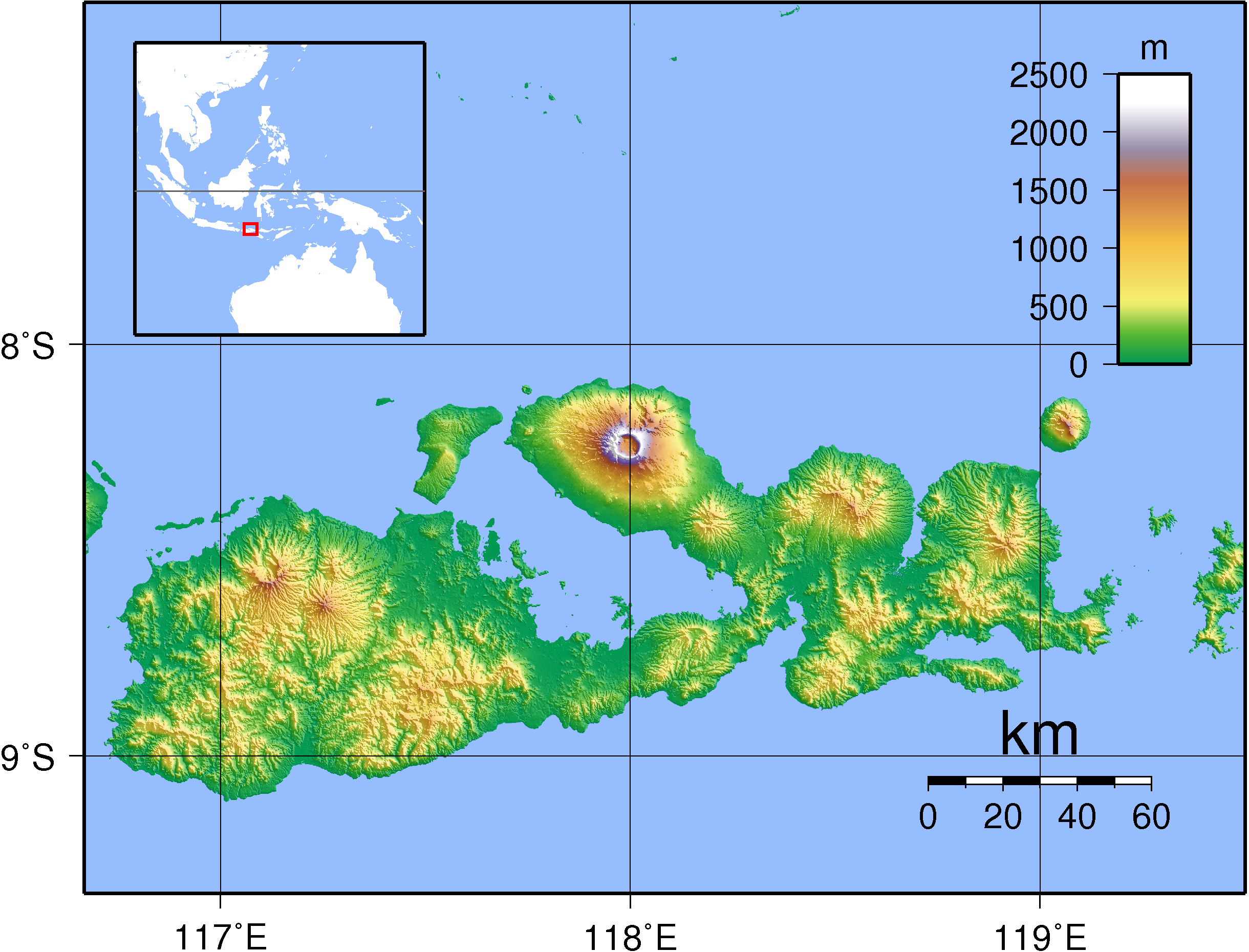
- Sumbawa island and Sape Strait
- Coordinates: 8°39′00″S 119°18′00″E
- Type: strait
- Basin countries: Indonesia
- References: Selat Sape: Indonesia National Geospatial-Intelligence Agency, Bethesda, MD, USA

The Sape Strait (Indonesian: Selat Sape) or Sapie Strait is a strait connecting the Flores Sea to the Sumba Strait. It separates the islands of Sumbawa and Komodo. It joins the Indonesian provinces of West Nusa Tenggara and East Nusa Tenggara.

The Sape Strait is known for rough seas, shoals and strong currents, as well as spectacular marine life. The waters of the strait are enjoying growing popularity among diving enthusiasts.

Part of the Sape water area is included in the Komodo National Park, a UNESCO World Heritage Site.

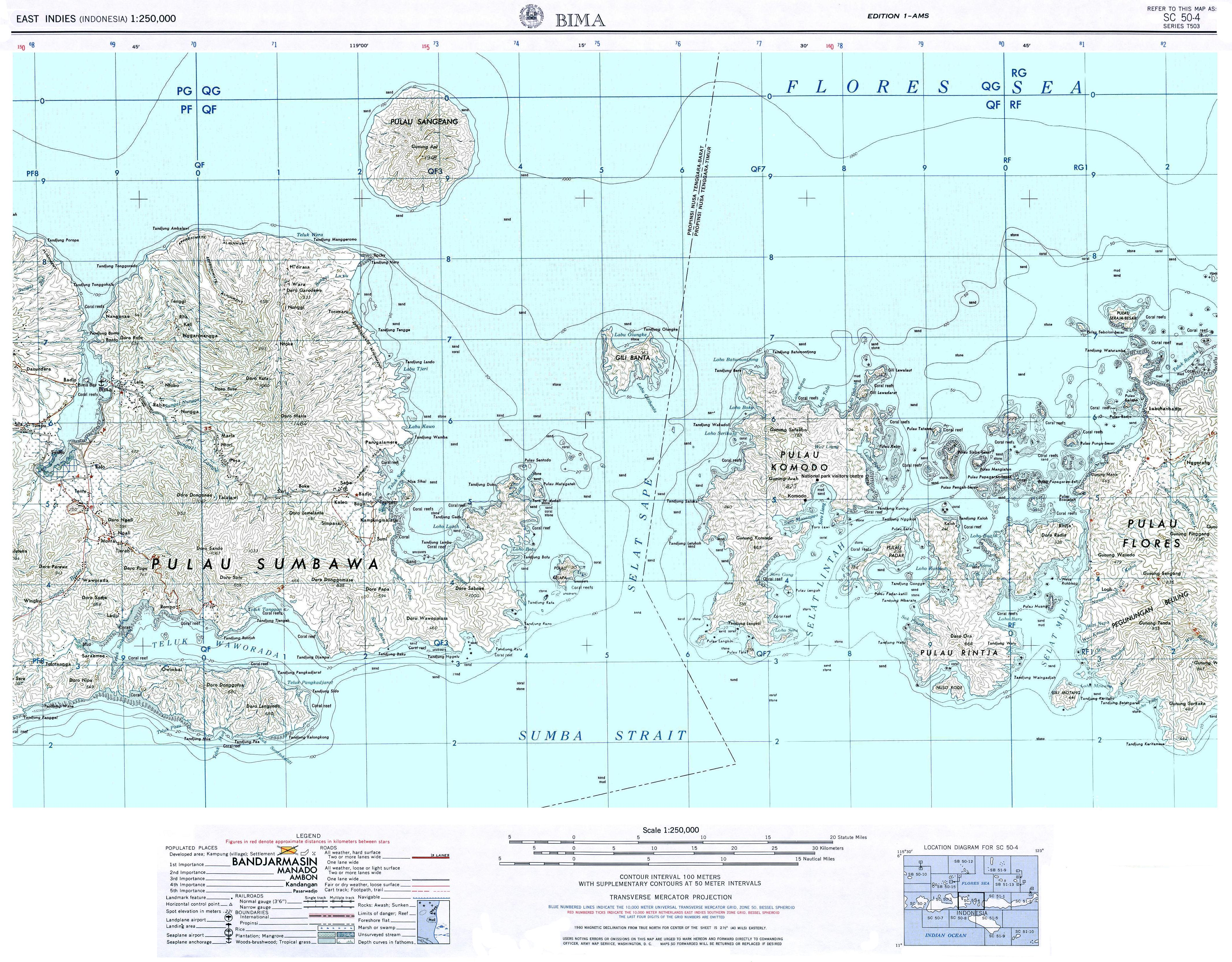
Map of the Sape Strait with the designation of the administrative boundary between the provinces of Western Small Sunda Islands and the Eastern Lesser Sunda Islands

The volcanic islands in the Strait include:

- Sangeang, Banta Island, Matagate Island (administratively part of Sumbawa Regency)
- Komodo Island, Rinca Island (administratively part of East Flores Regency)
