= Sangeang Api =

Complex volcano in Lesser Sunda Islands, Indonesia

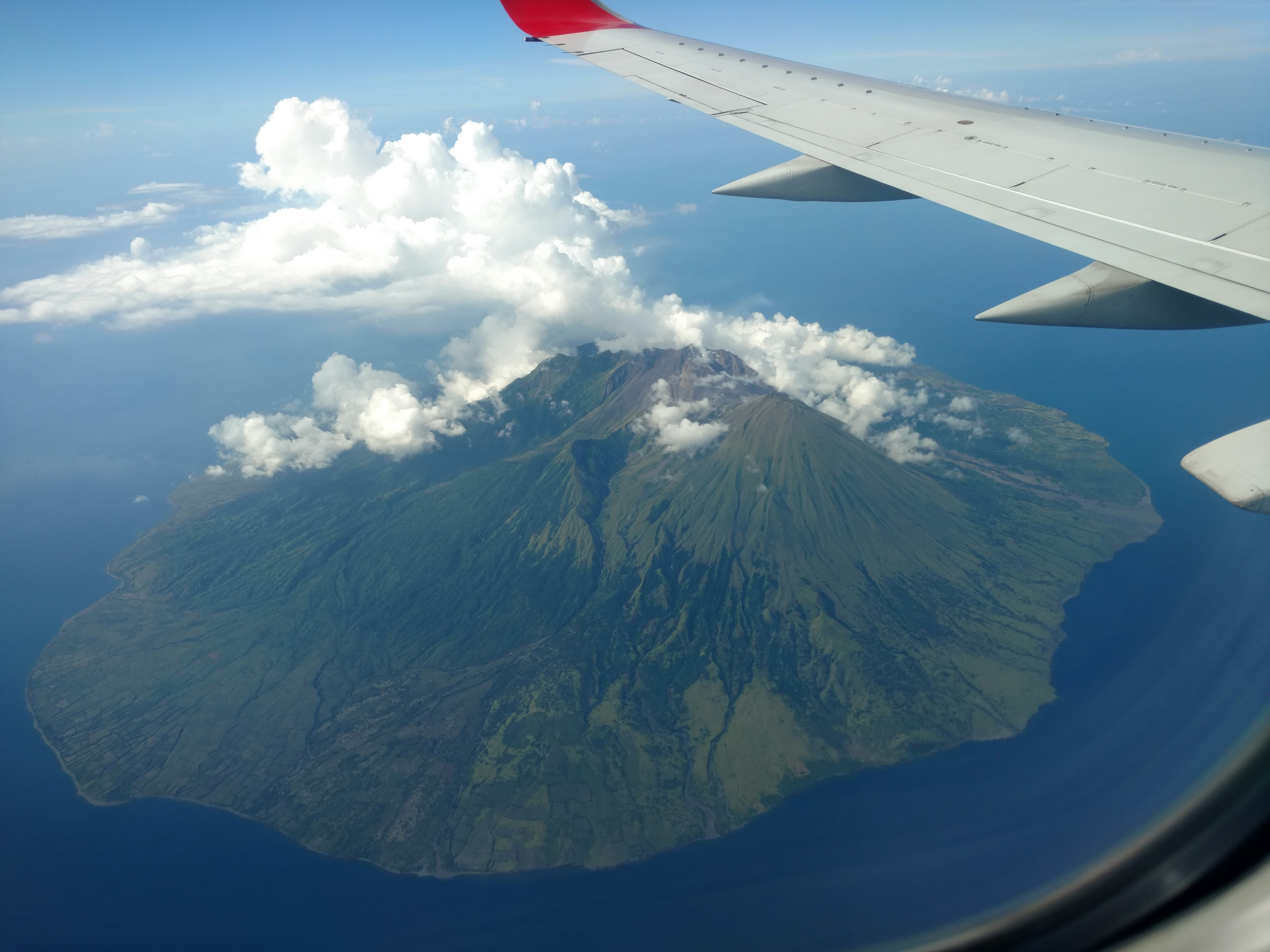

Highest point
- Elevation: 1,949 m (6,394 ft)
- Prominence: 1,949 m (6,394 ft)
- Listing: Ultra; Ribu; List of volcanoes in Indonesia
- Coordinates: 8°11′48″S 119°04′12″E

Geography
- Location within Indonesia
- Location: Lesser Sunda Islands, Indonesia

Geology
- Mountain type: Complex volcano
- Volcanic arc: Sunda Arc
- Last eruption: 2020

Sangeang Api (Gunung Api or Gunung Sangeang) is an active complex volcano on the island of Sangeang in Indonesia. It consists of two volcanic cones, 1,949 metres (6,394 ft) Doro Api and 1,795 m (5,889 ft) Doro Mantoi. Sangeang Api is one of the most active volcanoes in the Lesser Sunda Islands. Administratively the island forms one village (desa Sangeang) within Wera District (kecamatan) of Bima Regency; it covers a land area of 165.76 km^{2} and had a population of 4,848 in mid 2025.

== Location ==
The island of Sangeang is part of the Lesser Sunda Islands. It is located northeast of Sumbawa in the Flores Sea and is 13 km wide with an area of 165.76 km^{2}.

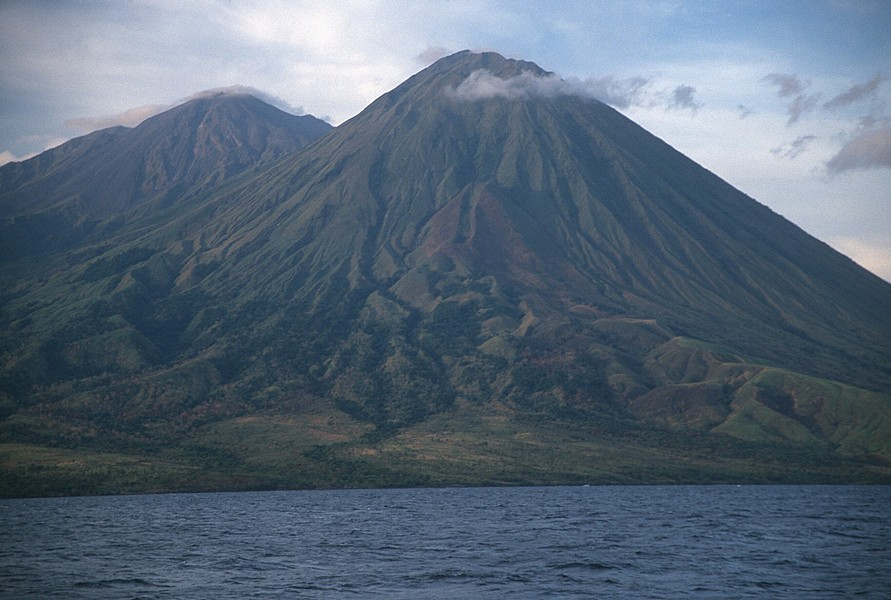
Mt. Sangeang, Oct. 2000

== Historical literature ==
The earliest document mentioning the Sang Hyang Api volcano was found in 14th century Majapahit script of Nagarakretagama. "Gunung Api" also appears as the name for the mountain in the first chapter of the novel The Long Journey by Johannes V. Jensen.

== Eruptions ==
The Sangeang Api and the Satonda volcanoes are eruption centers associated with the Tambora volcano.

The Sangeang Api erupted in 1988 and the island's inhabitants were evacuated. Between its first recorded eruption in 1512 and 1989, it erupted 17 times. It erupted again during December 2012 and May 2014.

=== 2014 Eruption ===
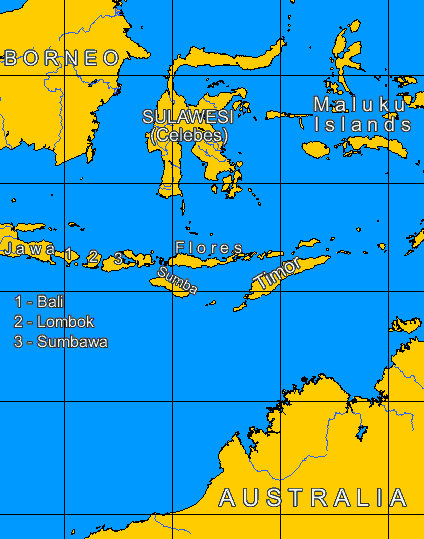
Lesser Sunda Islands and Java sea

Since mid-June 2013, authorities had put the volcano on 'high alert' for a possible eruption. On May 30, 2014, a major eruption occurred at around 3:55 p.m. local time. Farmers working on the island were evacuated. Ash and smoke quickly rose to an altitude of 15–20 km (9.3–12.4 mi) into the sky. By the next morning, the ash cloud had crossed the northwest coast of Australia in the Kimberley region, and airlines had cancelled flights into and from Darwin, Northern Territory. It later went as far as Alice Springs in the Northern Territory. On 31 May some flights from Melbourne and Adelaide to Bali were also cancelled.

== Climate ==
Sangeang Api has a subtropical highland climate (Cfb). It has moderate rainfall from June to September and heavy to extremely heavy rainfall in the remaining months.

Climate data for Sangeang Api summit
Month	Jan	Feb	Mar	Apr	May	Jun	Jul	Aug	Sep	Oct	Nov	Dec	Year
Mean daily maximum °C (°F)	21.8 (71.2)	21.4 (70.5)	22.2 (72.0)	22.2 (72.0)	21.8 (71.2)	21.1 (70.0)	21.0 (69.8)	21.9 (71.4)	22.7 (72.9)	23.2 (73.8)	22.2 (72.0)	21.5 (70.7)	21.9 (71.5)
Daily mean °C (°F)	17.2 (63.0)	16.9 (62.4)	17.5 (63.5)	17.2 (63.0)	16.8 (62.2)	16.1 (61.0)	15.5 (59.9)	16.0 (60.8)	16.7 (62.1)	17.5 (63.5)	17.5 (63.5)	17.1 (62.8)	16.8 (62.3)
Mean daily minimum °C (°F)	12.6 (54.7)	12.4 (54.3)	12.8 (55.0)	12.3 (54.1)	11.9 (53.4)	11.1 (52.0)	10.1 (50.2)	10.1 (50.2)	10.7 (51.3)	11.8 (53.2)	12.8 (55.0)	12.7 (54.9)	11.8 (53.2)
Average precipitation mm (inches)	776 (30.6)	633 (24.9)	571 (22.5)	350 (13.8)	193 (7.6)	94 (3.7)	64 (2.5)	62 (2.4)	95 (3.7)	165 (6.5)	365 (14.4)	553 (21.8)	3,921 (154.4)
Source: Climate-Data.org

== See also ==
- List of ultras of the Malay Archipelago
