= West Nusa Tenggara Regional House of Representatives =

West Nusa Tenggara Province Regional House of Representatives Dewan Perwakilan Rakyat Daerah Provinsi Nusa Tenggara Barat
- 2024–2029 Period

Type
- Type: Unicameral
- Term limits: 5 years

History
- Founded: 1958; 68 years ago
- New session started: 2 September 2024

Leadership
- Speaker: Hj. Baiq Isvie Rupaeda, S.H., M.H., Golkar since 16 October 2024
- Deputy Speaker: Lalu Wirajaya, Gerindra since 16 October 2024
- Deputy Speaker: Yek Agil, PKS since 16 October 2024
- Deputy Speaker: Drs. H. Muzihir, PPP since 16 October 2024

Structure
- Seats: 65
- Political groups: Government (34): Golkar (10); Gerindra (10); PPP (7); PAN (4); PBB (2); Hanura (1); Supported by (14): PKS (8); Democratic (6); Opposition (14): PKB (6); NasDem (4); PDI-P (4); Perindo (3)

Elections
- Voting system: Open list proportional representation
- Last election: 14 February 2024
- Next election: 2029

Meeting place
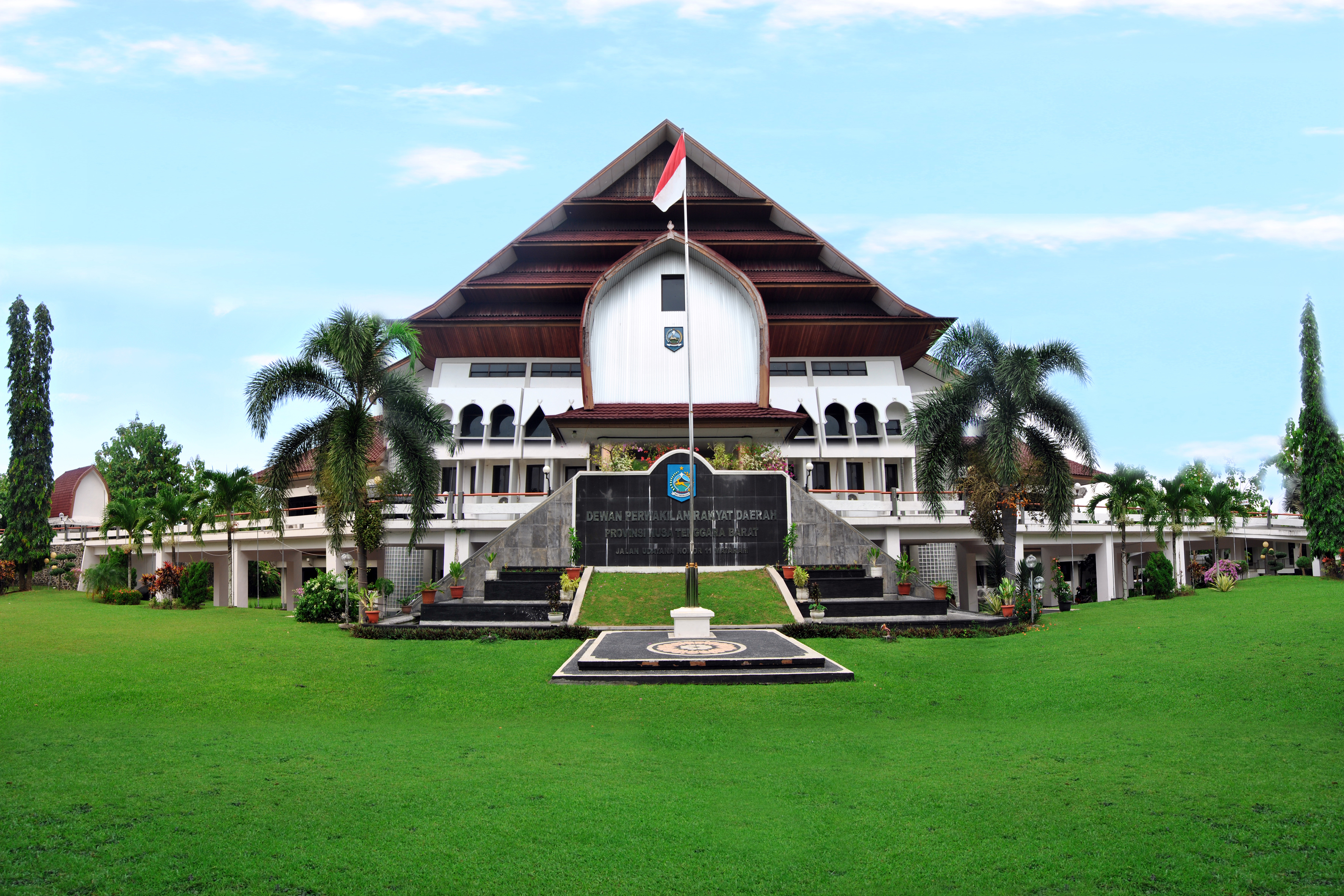
- West Nusa Tenggara Regional House of Representatives; Udayana Street Number 11; Selaparang, Mataram; West Nusa Tenggara, Indonesia

Website
- dprd-ntbprov.go.id

The West Nusa Tenggara Regional House of Representatives (Indonesian: Dewan Perwakilan Rakyat Daerah Provinsi Nusa Tenggara Barat, abbreviated to DPRD NTB) is the unicameral legislature of the Indonesian province of West Nusa Tenggara. Consisting of 65 people from the political parties with the most votes and elected every five years together with the national legislative election.

== General election results ==
=== 2024 Indonesian legislative election ===
The official valid votes received by political parties contesting the 2024 Indonesian legislative election in each electoral district (constituency) for the West Nusa Tenggara Regional House of Representatives are as follows.

2024 Indonesian legislative election results

Electoral district	PKB	Gerindra	PDI-P	Golkar	NasDem	Labour	Gelora	PKS	PKN	Hanura	Garuda	PAN	PBB	Democratic	PSI	Perindo	PPP	Ummat	Valid votes
West Nusa Tenggara 1	12,706	27,022	27,940	57,702	13,700	1,180	3,474	26,812	771	2,952	627	6,181	714	12,586	2,268	9,003	27,434	750	233,822
West Nusa Tenggara 2	53,821	66,141	28,331	107,482	39,977	2,680	11,251	41,467	3,544	4,925	1,720	44,672	20,413	60,487	4,063	39,920	35,560	5,192	571,646
West Nusa Tenggara 3	32,540	53,450	24,377	70,954	24,650	1,844	21,618	52,706	5,002	16,761	2,151	37,990	25,056	27,316	5,904	30,340	26,218	2,372	461,249
West Nusa Tenggara 4	34,660	38,363	21,504	38,576	21,274	1,654	4,836	38,421	183	5,158	697	4,898	6,926	27,343	639	23,575	8,325	3,407	280,439
West Nusa Tenggara 5	18,195	45,559	42,626	40,825	29,440	1,098	18,360	43,510	563	13,918	478	46,867	2,494	28,752	1,589	2,925	24,111	1,341	362,651
West Nusa Tenggara 6	29,970	67,723	18,444	76,497	50,785	1,605	19,785	46,956	716	23,064	3,148	65,840	29,255	61,526	1,159	15,373	42,783	1,786	556,415
West Nusa Tenggara 7	26,817	72,776	16,467	31,940	28,353	571	2,832	39,134	399	1,471	347	4,103	1,678	22,111	703	12,022	33,902	446	296,072
West Nusa Tenggara 8	20,277	36,673	33,848	54,139	19,429	807	2,600	42,336	327	1,317	257	4,838	16,292	24,535	6,607	10,988	48,877	358	324,505
Total	228,986	407,707	213,537	478,115	227,608	11,439	84,756	331,342	11,505	69,566	9,425	215,389	102,828	264,656	22,932	144,146	247,210	15,652	3,086,799
Source: General Elections Commission of Indonesia

== Composition ==
The following is the composition of members of the West Nusa Tenggara Regional House of Representatives in the last four periods.

Party	Total seats			
Party	2009–2014	2014–2019	2019–2024	2024–2029
PKB seats	1	▲5	▲6	6
Gerindra seats	2	▲8	▲9	▲10
PDI-P seats	5	5	▼4	4
Golkar seats	10	▲11	▼10	10
NasDem seats		3	▲5	▼4
PKS seats	6	6	▲7	▲8
Hanura seats	3	▲5	▼1	1
PAN seats	4	▲5	5	▼4
PBB seats	5	▼3	▼2	2
Demokrat seats	8	8	▼7	▼6
Perindo seats			0	▲3
PPP seats	4	▲6	▲7	7
Berkarya seats			2	
PPPI seats	1			
PPRN seats	1			
PKNU seats	1			
PBR seats	2			
PKPB seats	2			
Total Seats	55	▲65	65	65
Total Party	15	▼11	▲12	12

== Electoral District ==
In the 2019 Legislative Election and the 2024 Legislative Election, the West Nusa Tenggara Regional House of Representatives election was divided into 8 electoral districts as follows:

Electoral District Name	Electoral District Area	Number of Seats
WEST NUSA TENGGARA 1	Mataram	5
WEST NUSA TENGGARA 2	West Lombok Regency, North Lombok Regency	12
WEST NUSA TENGGARA 3	East Lombok Regency A (Masbagik, Sukamulia, Selong, Pringgabaya, Aikmel, Sambelia, Pringgasela, Suralaga, Wanasaba, Sembalun, Suwela, Labuhan Haji, Lenek (since 2024))	9
WEST NUSA TENGGARA 4	East Lombok Regency B (Keruak, Sakra, Terara, Sikur, Montong Gading, Sakra Timur, Sakra Barat, Jerowaru)	6
WEST NUSA TENGGARA 5	West Sumbawa Regency, Sumbawa Regency	8
WEST NUSA TENGGARA 6	Dompu Regency, Bima Regency, Bima	11
WEST NUSA TENGGARA 7	Central Lombok Regency A (Praya, Batukliang, Janapria, Kopang, Praya Tengah, Batukliang Utara)	7
WEST NUSA TENGGARA 8	Central Lombok Regency B (Jonggat, Pujut, Praya Barat, Praya Timur, Pringgarata, Praya Barat Daya)	7
TOTAL		65

== List of members ==
=== 2024–2029 Period ===
The following is a list of members of the West Nusa Tenggara Regional House of Representatives for the 2024–2029 term.

Member Name	Political party	Electoral District	Valid Vote	Faction	Information
Drs. H. Jamhur, M.Pd.	PKB	West Nusa Tenggara 2	15.699	PKB	
Wahyu Apriawan Riski	PKB	West Nusa Tenggara 3	1.384	PKB	
Roi Lasmana, A.Md.	PKB	West Nusa Tenggara 4	21.770	PKB	
Akhdiansyah, S.H.I.	PKB	West Nusa Tenggara 6	16.111	PKB	
Lalu Muhibban	PKB	West Nusa Tenggara 7	18.079	PKB	
H. Lalu Pelita Putra, S.H.	PKB	West Nusa Tenggara 8	14.221	PKB	
Rangga Danu Meinaga Adhitama, S.H., M.H.	Gerindra	West Nusa Tenggara 1	6.065	Gerindra	
Hj. Nanik Suryatiningsih	Gerindra	West Nusa Tenggara 2	21.529	Gerindra	
Sudirsah Sujanto, S.Pd.B., S.I.P.	Gerindra	West Nusa Tenggara 2	17.649	Gerindra	
Lale Yaqutunnafis, M.M.	Gerindra	West Nusa Tenggara 3	25.598	Gerindra	
Syamsu Rijal, S.H., M.M.	Gerindra	West Nusa Tenggara 4	12.828	Gerindra	
Iwan Panjidinata, S.E.	Gerindra	West Nusa Tenggara 5	10.379	Gerindra	
Yasin, M.M.Inov.	Gerindra	West Nusa Tenggara 6	16.952	Gerindra	
Lalu Wirajaya	Gerindra	West Nusa Tenggara 7	35.910	Gerindra	
Ali Usman Ahim	Gerindra	West Nusa Tenggara 7	27.200	Gerindra	
Lalu Sudiartawan, S.H.	Gerindra	West Nusa Tenggara 8	16.159	Gerindra	
Ir. Made Slamet, M.M.	PDI-P	West Nusa Tenggara 1	17.528	Persatuan Perjuangan Restorasi	
H. Raden Nuna Abriadi, S.I.P.	PDI-P	West Nusa Tenggara 2	12.781	Persatuan Perjuangan Restorasi	
Abdul Rahim, S.T.	PDI-P	West Nusa Tenggara 5	17.672	Persatuan Perjuangan Restorasi	
Suhaimi, S.H.	PDI-P	West Nusa Tenggara 8	21.157	Persatuan Perjuangan Restorasi	
H. Didi Sumardi, S.H.	Golkar	West Nusa Tenggara 1	16.526	Golkar	
Lalu Irwansyah Triadi	Golkar	West Nusa Tenggara 2	39.072	Golkar	
Lalu Ahmad Ismail, S.H.	Golkar	West Nusa Tenggara 2	31.063	Golkar	
Hj. Baiq Isvie Rupaeda, S.H., M.H.	Golkar	West Nusa Tenggara 3	35.871	Golkar	
Hamdan Kasim	Golkar	West Nusa Tenggara 4	17.782	Golkar	
H. Nurdin Marjuni, S.H.	Golkar	West Nusa Tenggara 5	6.704	Golkar	
Harwoto	Golkar	West Nusa Tenggara 6	18.377	Golkar	
Efan Limantika	Golkar	West Nusa Tenggara 6	11.802	Golkar	
Drs. H. Humaidi	Golkar	West Nusa Tenggara 7	17.803	Golkar	
Megawati Lestari, S.H., M.H.	Golkar	West Nusa Tenggara 8	27.532	Golkar	
H. Suharto, S.T., M.M.	NasDem	West Nusa Tenggara 2	12.011	Persatuan Perjuangan Restorasi	
H. Asaat Abdullah, S.T.	NasDem	West Nusa Tenggara 5	13.973	Persatuan Perjuangan Restorasi	
Dr. Raihan Anwar	NasDem	West Nusa Tenggara 6	16.842	Persatuan Perjuangan Restorasi	
H. Lalu Arif Rahman Hakim, S.E., M.H.	NasDem	West Nusa Tenggara 7	15.849	Persatuan Perjuangan Restorasi	
TGH. Achmad Muchlis	PKS	West Nusa Tenggara 1	9.664	PKS	
TGH. Satriawan, Lc., M.A.	PKS	West Nusa Tenggara 2	16.471	PKS	
TGH. Muhannan Mu'min Mushonnaf, Lc., M.H.	PKS	West Nusa Tenggara 3	13.324	PKS	
H. Burhanuddin, S.A.P.	PKS	West Nusa Tenggara 4	21.957	PKS	
Sambirang Ahmadi	PKS	West Nusa Tenggara 5	20.720	PKS	
H. Syamsudin, S.E.	PKS	West Nusa Tenggara 6	16.682	PKS	
Yek Agil	PKS	West Nusa Tenggara 7	30.542	PKS	
TGH. Patompo, M.H.	PKS	West Nusa Tenggara 8	13.261	PKS	
Ahmad Dahlan, S.Sos.	Hanura	West Nusa Tenggara 6	13.060	Amanat Bintang Nurani Rakyat	
H. Hasbullah Muis Konco	PAN	West Nusa Tenggara 2	26.453	Amanat Bintang Nurani Rakyat	
Hulaemi, S.E.	PAN	West Nusa Tenggara 3	14.011	Amanat Bintang Nurani Rakyat	
H. Salman, S.H.	PAN	West Nusa Tenggara 5	8.543	Amanat Bintang Nurani Rakyat	
Muhamad Aminurlah, S.E.	PAN	West Nusa Tenggara 6	19.708	Amanat Bintang Nurani Rakyat	
Muliadi, S.Pd.I.	PBB	West Nusa Tenggara 3	13.271	Amanat Bintang Nurani Rakyat	
Nadirah, S.E., Akt.	PBB	West Nusa Tenggara 6	14.224	Amanat Bintang Nurani Rakyat	
Indra Jaya Usman Putra, S.Fil.I.	Democratic	West Nusa Tenggara 2	23.630	Demokrat	
H. Lalu Zaenul Hamdi, S.Pd.	Democratic	West Nusa Tenggara 3	13.227	Demokrat	
R. Rahadian Soedjono	Democratic	West Nusa Tenggara 4	13.674	Demokrat	
Syamsul Fikri, S.Ag., M.Si.	Democratic	West Nusa Tenggara 5	12.074	Demokrat	
Abdul Rauf, S.T., M.M.	Democratic	West Nusa Tenggara 6	18.970	Demokrat	
Azhar, S.Pd.I.	Democratic	West Nusa Tenggara 8	9.292	Demokrat	
Hj. Rohani, S.Pd.	Perindo	West Nusa Tenggara 2	12.395	Persatuan Perjuangan Restorasi	
TGH. Sholah Sukarnawadi, M.A.	Perindo	West Nusa Tenggara 3	16.235	Persatuan Perjuangan Restorasi	
M. Nashib Ikroman	Perindo	West Nusa Tenggara 4	13.362	Persatuan Perjuangan Restorasi	
Drs. H. Muzihir	PPP	West Nusa Tenggara 1	21.576	PPP	
H. Muhammad Ruslan, S.H.	PPP	West Nusa Tenggara 2	19.423	PPP	
H. Ruhaiman, S.E., M.M.	PPP	West Nusa Tenggara 3	16.027	PPP	
Rusli Manawari	PPP	West Nusa Tenggara 5	9.796	PPP	
Marga Harun, S.H.	PPP	West Nusa Tenggara 6	20.233	PPP	
H. Moh. Akri, S.H.I.	PPP	West Nusa Tenggara 7	18.817	PPP	
Sitti Ari, S.P.	PPP	West Nusa Tenggara 8	19.669	PPP	

== See also ==
- Regional House of Representatives
