= Bayan, Bayan, North Lombok =

Desa Bayan
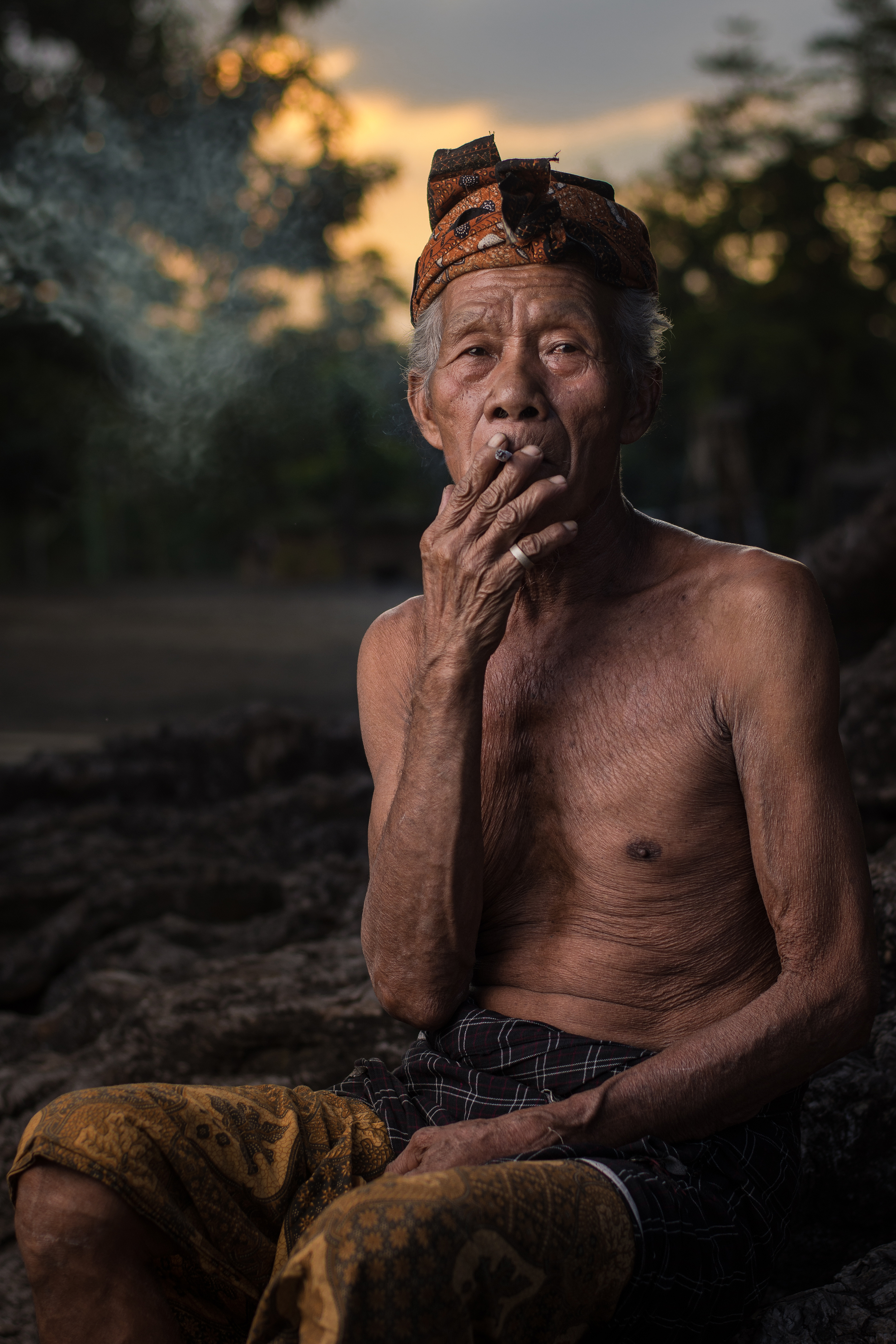
- An elder of the Bayan people

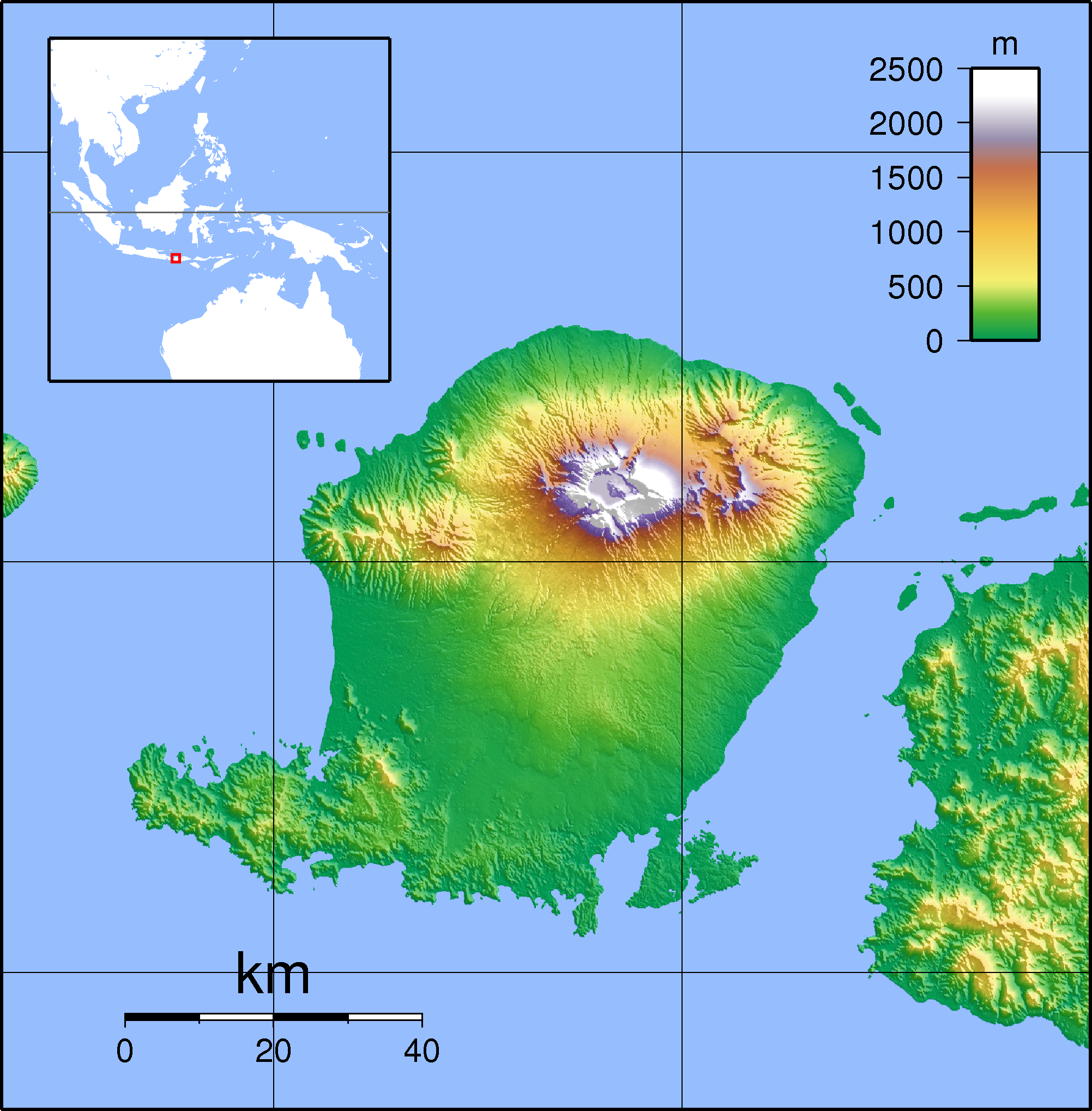
- Location within Lombok Location within Indonesia
- Country: Indonesia
- Province: West Nusa Tenggara
- Regency: North Lombok

Area
  - Total: 366.10 km^{2} (141.35 sq mi)

Population
  - Total: 5,383
  - Density: 14.70/km^{2} (38.08/sq mi)
- Website: https://bayan-lombokutara.desa.id/

Bayan (Indonesian pronunciation: [ˈbajan]) is a village located in Bayan Subdistrict in North Lombok, Lombok, Indonesia.

== Administration ==
Bayan is divided into thirteen dusun, or fourth-level subdivisions:

1. Batu Jompang
2. Bayan Timur
3. Bayan Barat
4. Bual
5. Dasan Tutul
6. Karang Salah
7. Mandala
8. Montong Baru
9. Nangka Rempek
10. Pada Mangko
11. Sembulan
12. Teres Genit
13. Ujung Mekar

== Culture ==
Bayan is a center of the Wetu Telu religion, and a stronghold of Sasak traditions and culture. The traditional two-day Mawlid of Maulid Adat Bayan takes place yearly.

Bayan is home to the oldest mosque on Lombok, Bayan Beleq Mosque.

== Gallery ==
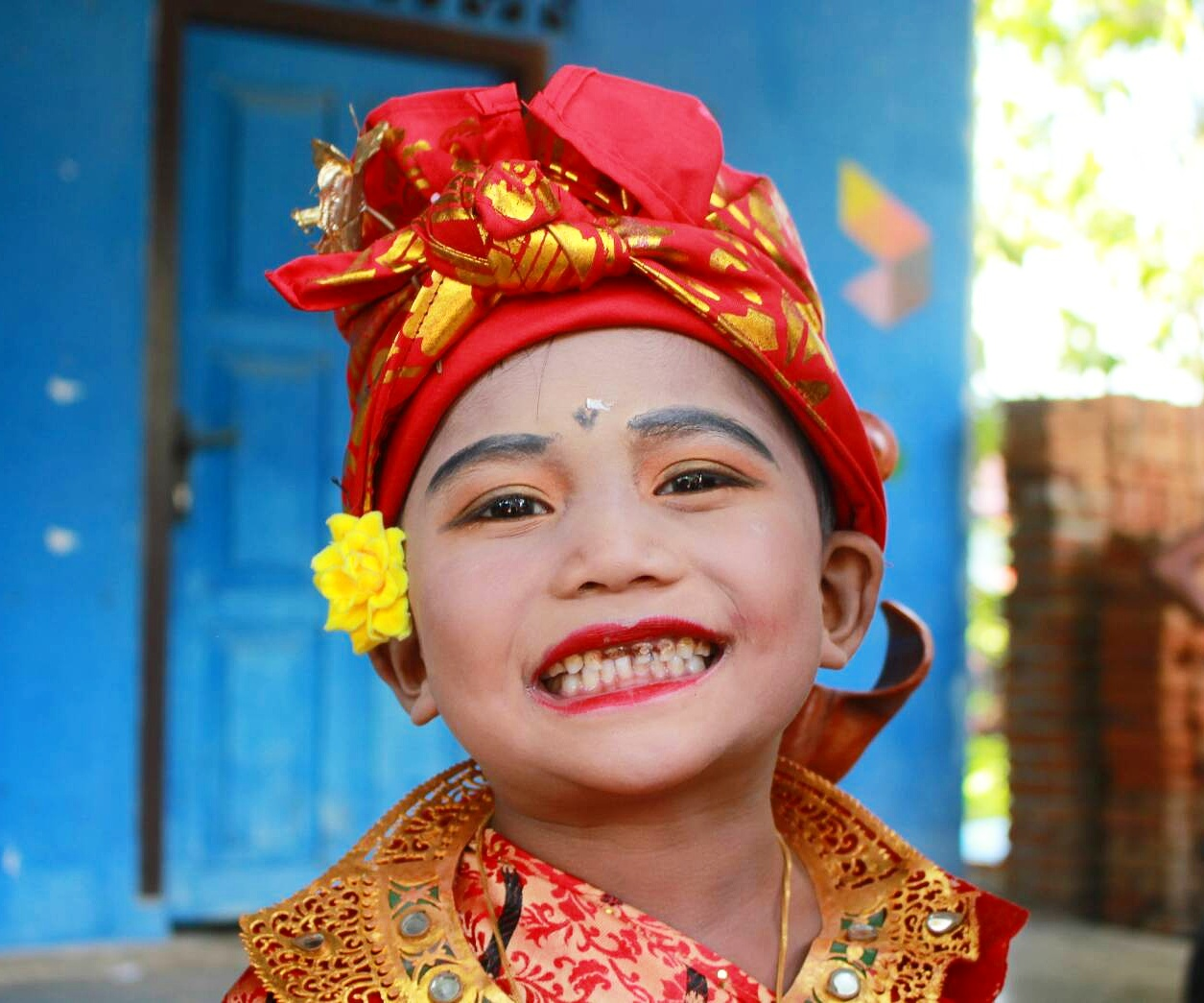
Child during a khitan (circumcision) ceremony

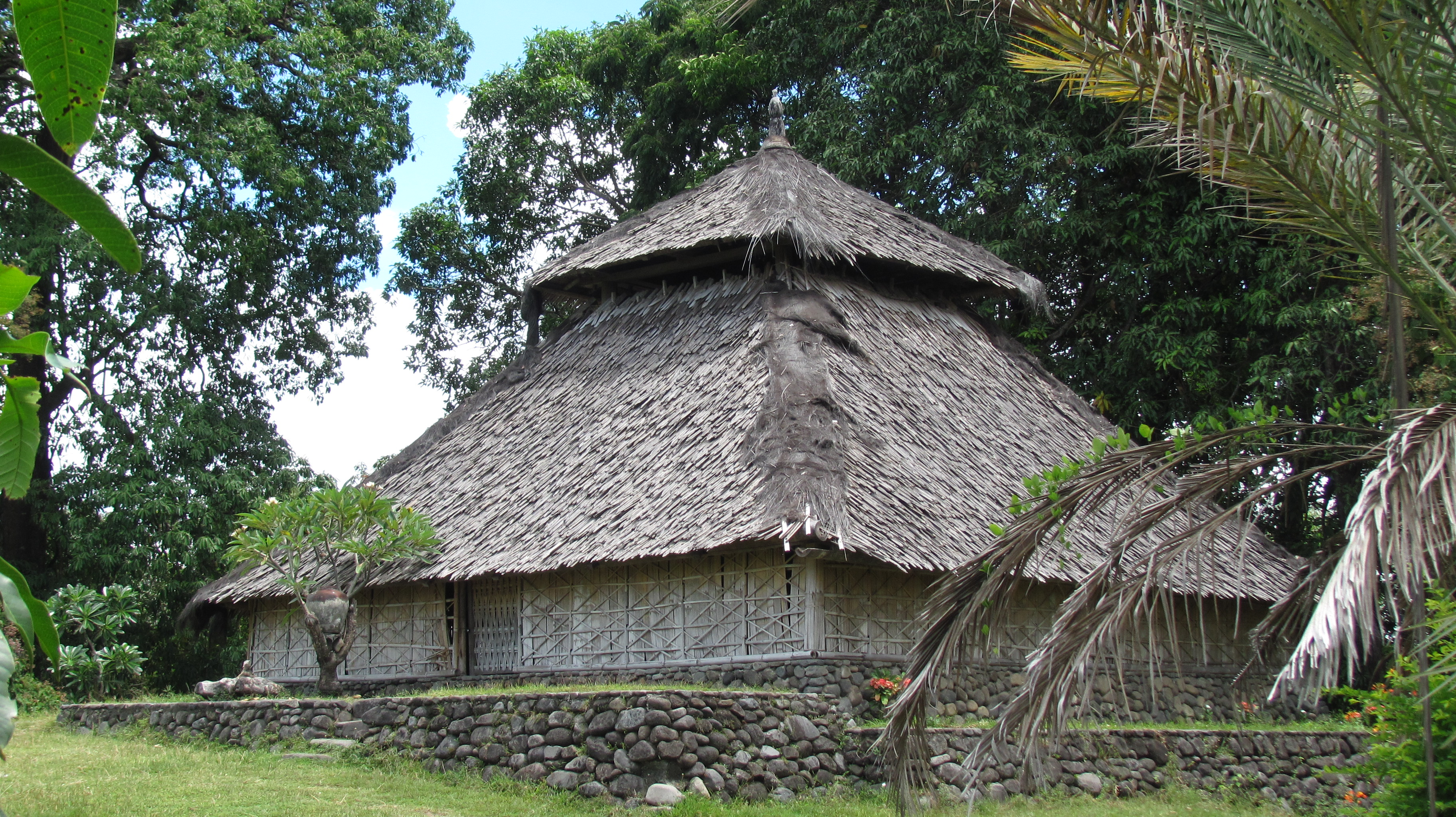
Bayan Beleq Mosque, the oldest mosque on Lombok

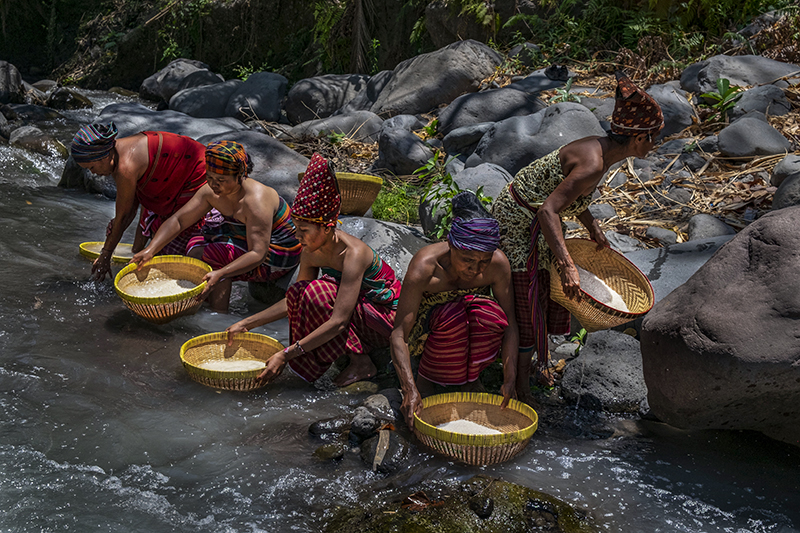
Ritual of Bisoq Beras (washing rice)
