= Sasak people =

Ethnic group in Indonesia

Sasak people Sasaks
Dengan Sasaq ᬲᬸᬓᬸᬲᬲᬓ᭄
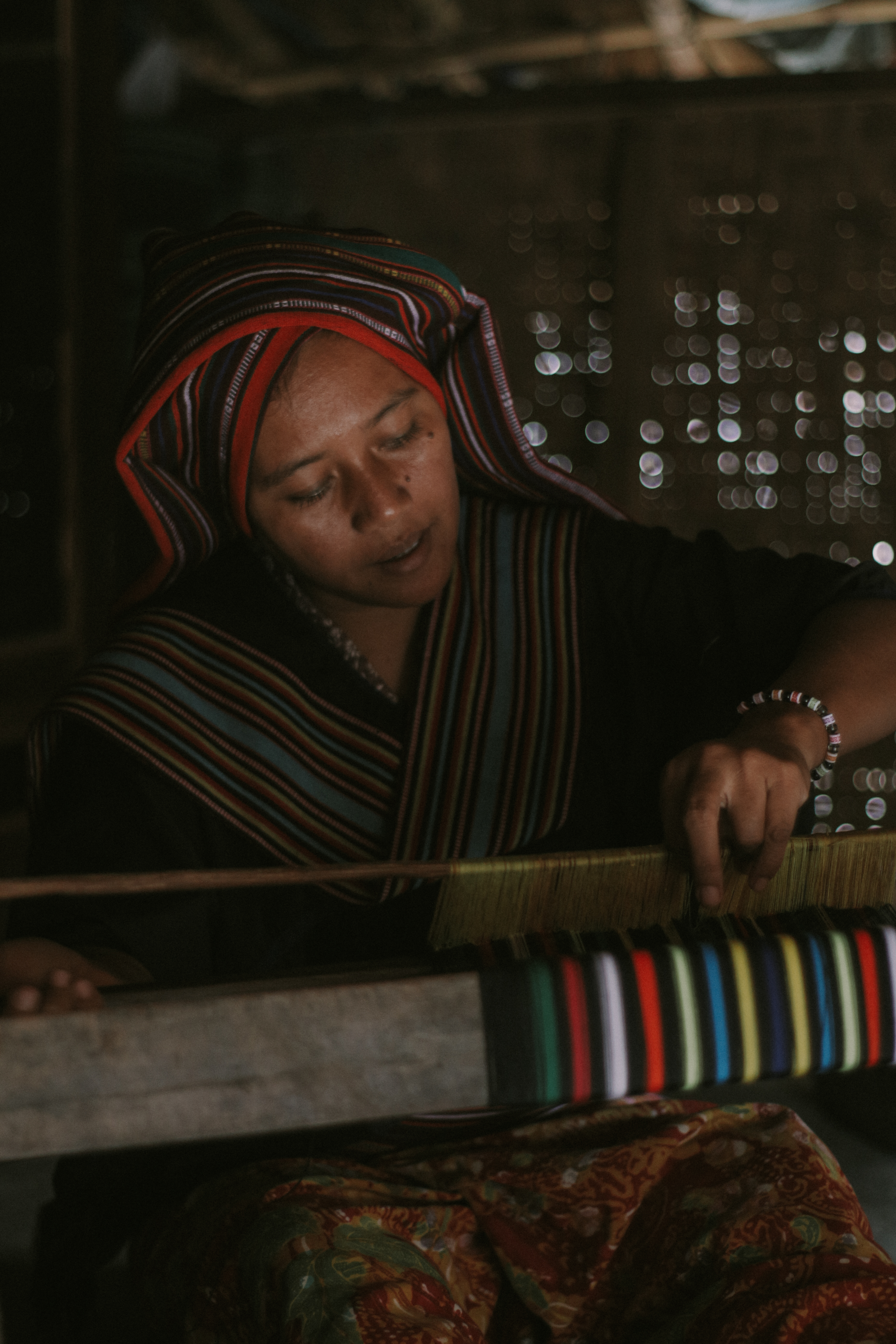
- A Sasak woman making traditional cloth

Total population
- 3,173,127 (2010 Indonesian census)

Regions with significant populations
- Indonesia: 3,173,127
- West Nusa Tenggara: 3,033,631
- Bali: 22,672
- East Kalimantan: 22,194
- Central Sulawesi: 20,436
- South Kalimantan: 11,878
- South Sulawesi: 11,335
- Malaysia: unknown

Languages
- Native: Sasak; Dialects: North Sasak (Kutó-Kuté, Bayan-Sasak) · Northeast (Sasak Nggetó-Nggeté) · Central Sasak (Menó-Mené) · Central East Sasak-Central West Sasak (Ngenó-Ngené) · Central South Sasak (Meriaq-Meriku); Other: Indonesian, Arabic (religious only)

Religion
- Predominantly Sunni Islam, with minorities adhering to the Islamic sect of Wetu Telu and Buddhism

Related ethnic groups
- Austronesian peoples Bayanese · Balinese · Bali Aga · Sumbawa · Dompuan · Bimanese · Javanese

The Sasak people (Note: /ˈsɑːsɑːk/ SAH-sahk) (Sasak: Dengan Sasaq, Sasak script: ᬲᬸᬓᬸᬲᬲᬓ᭄; Indonesian: Orang Sasak) or Sasaknese, mainly live on the island of Lombok, West Nusa Tenggara Province, Indonesia, numbering around 3.6 million (85% of Lombok's population). They are related to the Balinese in language and in ancestry, as well as to other ethnic groups on the neighboring island of Sumbawa. The Bayan people are a distinct part of the Sasak people, and are the oldest group on Lombok.

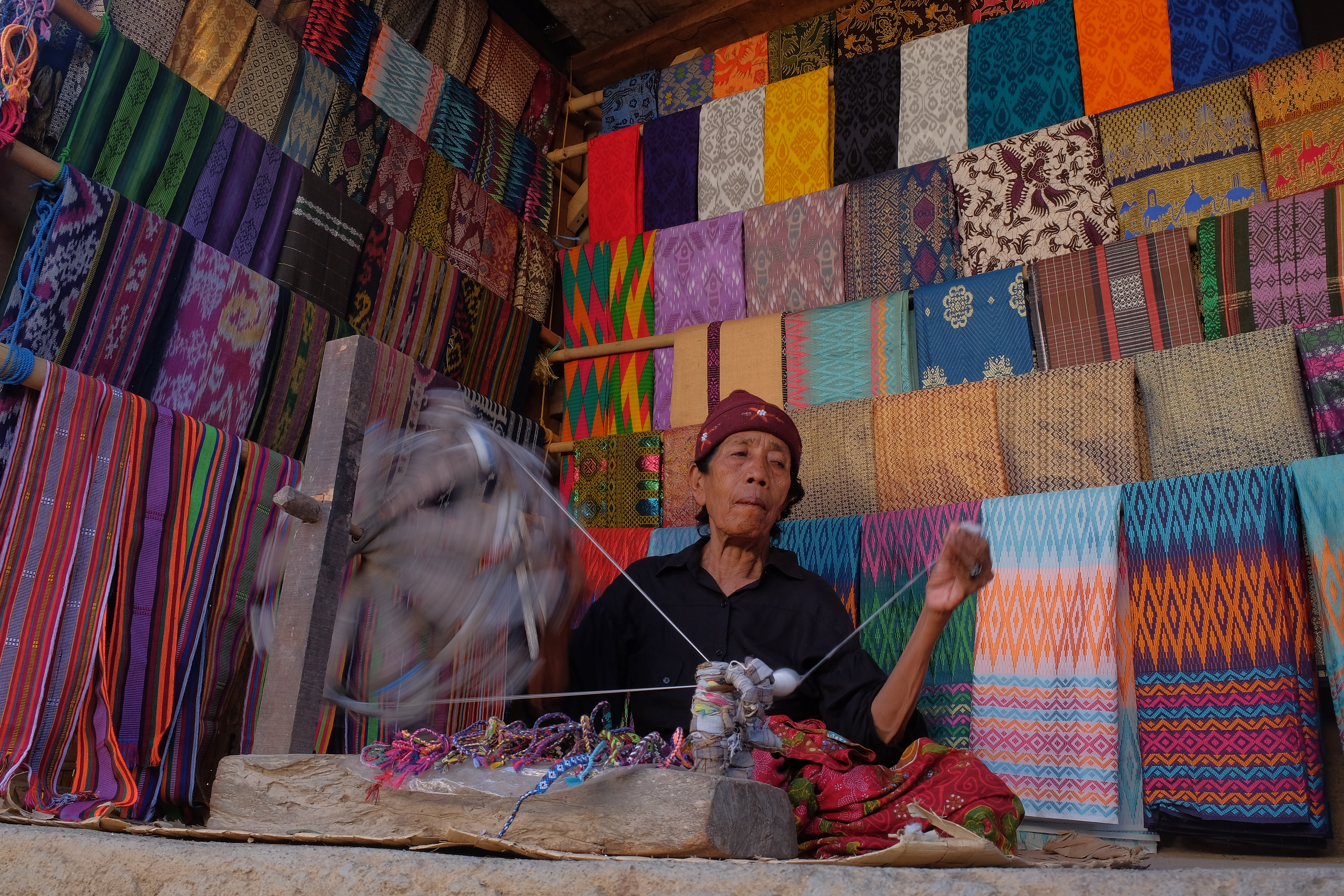
Pintal Benang ("Spinning Yarn"), a tradition of the Sasak people

The Sasak people are predominantly Muslim.

== Etymology ==
The name "Sasak" was first mentioned in the 11th century Pujungan Inscription, an inscription found in Tabanan Regency, Bali.

The origin of the name "Sasak" may come from the word sak-sak, which means "boat"; it may also mean "one by one". The word sak is also used by some Dayak people on Kalimantan to mean "one". In the 14th century Nagarakṛtāgama, the word Sasak is mentioned along with Lombok in the Kawi phrase Lombok Sasak Mirah Adhi, in which Lombok means "straight" or "honest", Mirah means "gem", Sasak means "statement", and Adhi means "something that is good" or "utmost". Therefore, Lombok Sasak Mirah Adhi means "honesty is the gem that states goodness".

According to local tradition, it is believed that the word "Sasak" comes from the phrase sa'-saq which means "the one", followed by the word Lombok which originates from the word Lomboq, meaning "straight". Hence, Sa'-saq Lombok means "something that is straight". Other translations also include "a straight road".

Weaving, an important part of Sasak culture, is known as sèsèk in the Sasak language; the word sèsèk comes from the words seksi, sesek, or saksak. Sèsèk is done by threading the threads one by one (sak-sak), then tightening the threads, and then forming a cloth by beating them on a loom. The sound heard when beating the loom is similar to the sound "sak-sak", and it is only done twice. Yet another theory is that the word Sasak means "bamboo woven together".

== History ==
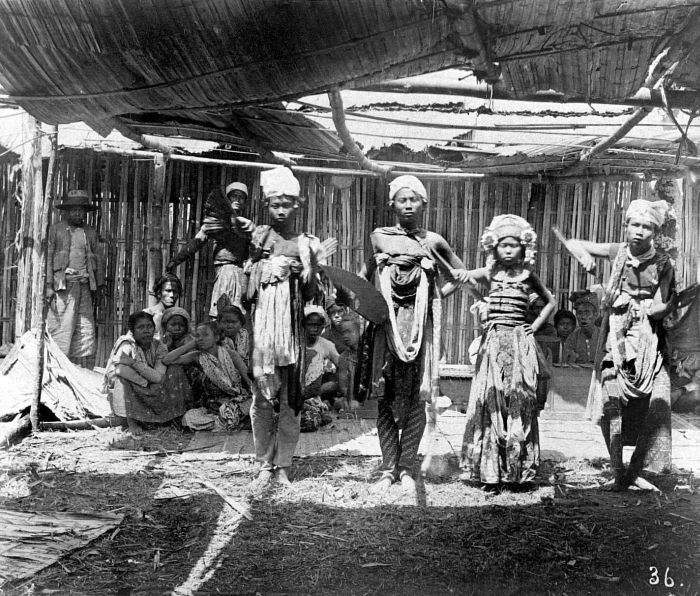
Sasak dancers

Little is known about early Sasak history except that Lombok was placed under direct rule of the Majaphait Empire by the 14th century Mahapatih (Note: Full title: Mahapatih Hamengkubumi, equivalent to the position of a prime minister.) Gajah Mada. Islam arrived into the area around the 15th century, and Sasaks converted to Islam between the late 16th century to early 17th century. This was done under the influence of Pangeran Prapen (Sunan Prapen), the son of Raden Paku (Sunan Giri); alternatively, this was done by Sunan Giri himself and the Muslim Makassarese, frequently mixing basic Islamic beliefs with Animist to create the Wetu Telu religion. Lombok was conquered by the Gelgel Balinese kingdom in the early 16th century, thus bringing a large population of Balinese people to Lombok. The Balinese population of Lombok today is about 300,000, or 10–15% of Lombok's population. The Balinese have also strongly influenced the Wetu Telu religion.

== Language ==
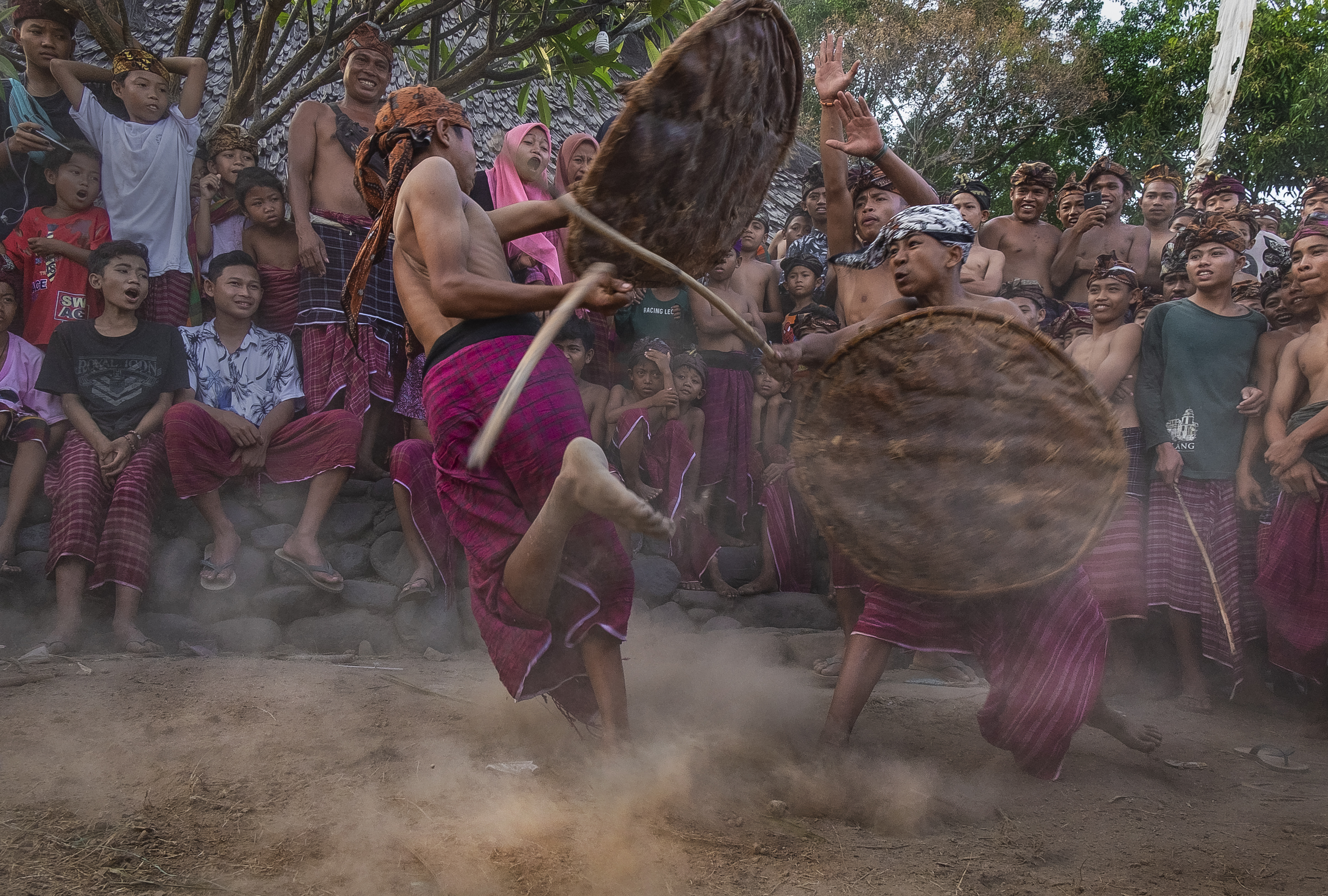
Peresean, a traditional Sasak sport

The Sasak language (Sasak: Base Sasaq) is an Austronesian language belonging to the Malayo-Sumbawan branch, mostly found in Western Indonesia and Malaysia. More specifically, Sasak belongs to the languages of Western Indonesia, meaning it is closely related to the languages of Java (such as Javanese and Sundanese) and languages of Bali (such as Balinese). There are also a number of Sasak dialects in various regions, such as Kutó-Kuté and Bayan-Sasak (North Sasak), Menó-Mené (Central Sasak), Meriaq-Meriku (Central South Sasak), Ngenó-Ngené (Central East Sasak and Central West Sasak), and Nggetó-Nggeté (Northeast Sasak).

== Religion ==
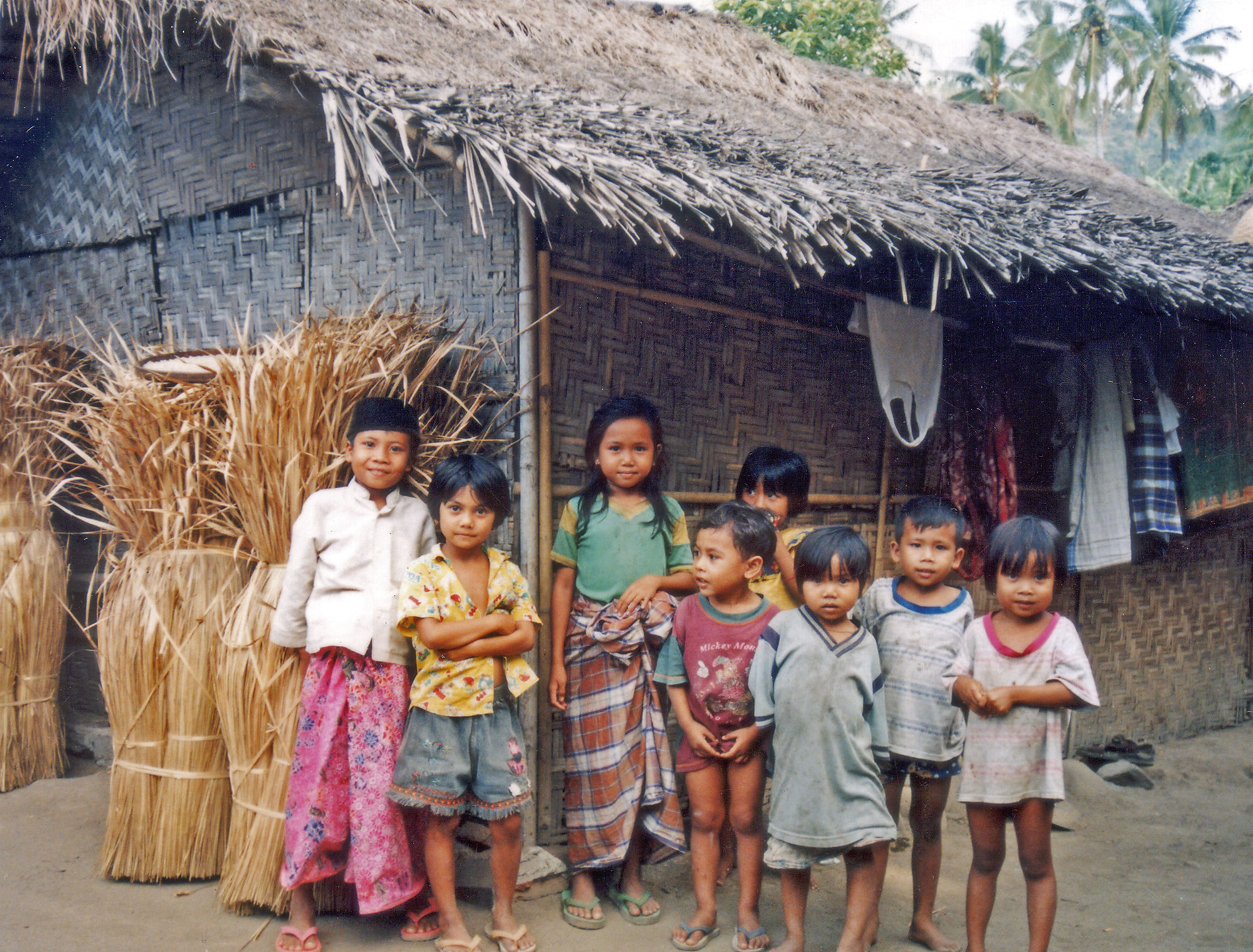
Sasak children in a Sasak village, ca. 1997

Most Sasaks today are adherents of the Lima Waktu (lit. 'Five Times') version of Islam, signifying the five daily prayers which Muslims are required to perform; this in contrast to Sasaks who are practitioners of Wetu Telu (lit. 'Three Times') Islam, who only pray three times a day. Orthodox Islamic teachers generally instruct adherents to pray five times a day.

Large numbers of people adhering to the Wetu Telu branch can still be found throughout the island, especially in the village of Bayan, where the religion originated. Large Wetu Telu communities can be also be found in Mataram, Pujung, Sengkol, Rambitan, Sade, Tetebatu, Bumbung, Sembalun, Senaru, Loyok, and Pasugulan.

Before the widespread adoption of Islam, Lombok was primarily Hindu. The Balinese Kingdom of Karangasem conquered Lombok in the 17th century, further spreading Balinese Hinduism, the influence of which still remains. Many ancient Hindu pura, such as Gunung Pengsong, Lingsar, Meru, and Suranadi, still remain standing.

== Art performances ==
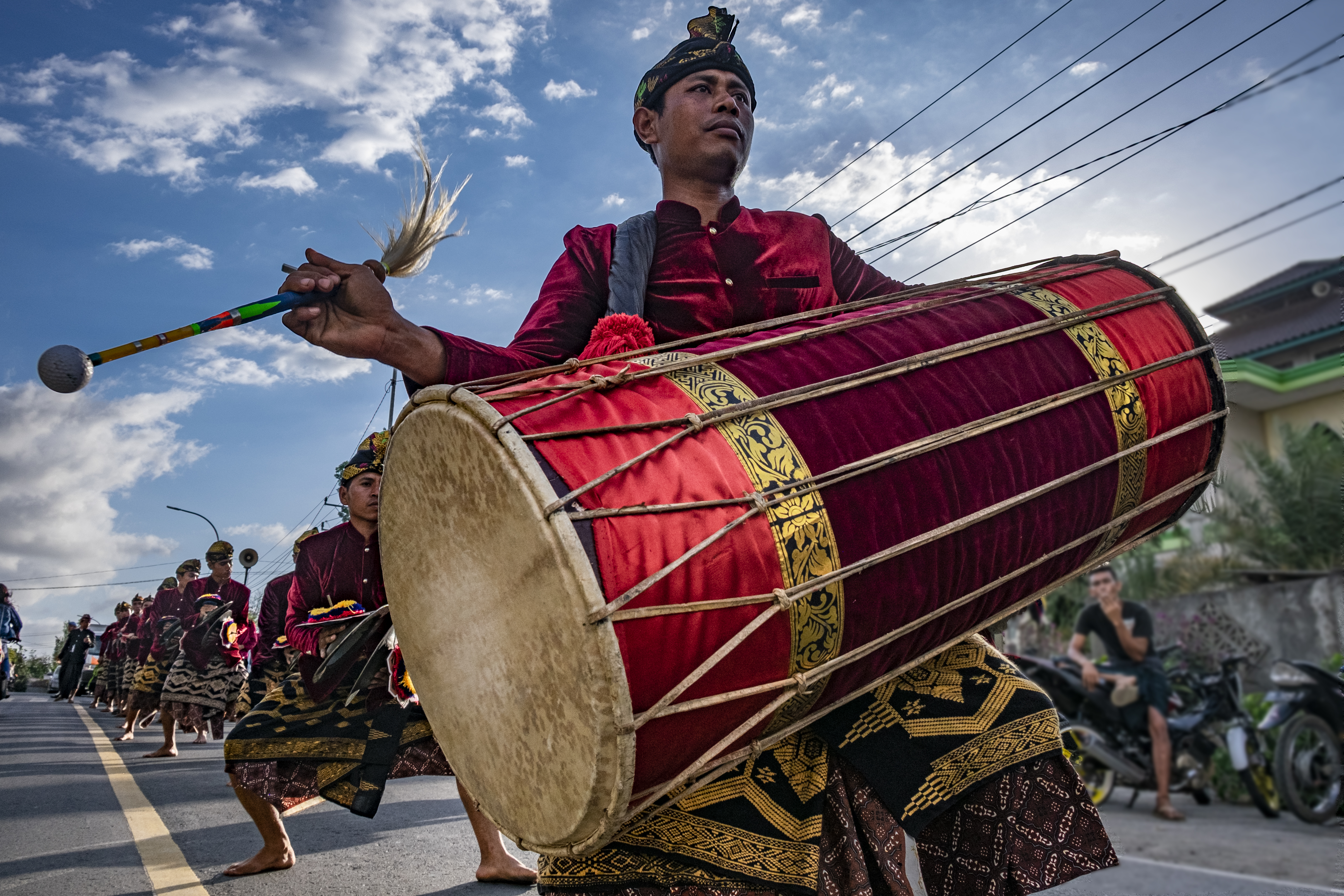
Gendang beleq performance on a road

- Gandrung dance
- Gendang beleq dance

== See also ==
- Sasak architecture
- Austronesian expansion
