= Sasak architecture =

Sasak architecture refers to the vernacular architecture of the Sasak, the majority indigenous ethnic group of the Indonesian island of Lombok.

== Background ==
Lombok lies immediately to the east of Bali and is approximately the same size, however, its climate and terrain differ. The majority of the island's population is the central plain between the mountainous north and the barren, arid south. Lombok's west has a large immigrant Balinese population, and their houses and temples are similar to those of Bali.

The Muslim and animist Sasak majority live in the drier eastern part of the island. Their houses rise in tiers up the hot bare hills of Lombok's southern peninsula. The majority of the traditional houses in the more developed parts of the island are no longer used. However, in the southern part of the island they are still lived in as most villagers cannot afford to change their way of life, but also because they are proud of their culture and as tourism increases there is a financial incentive to maintain the structures.

Villages are clustered on low escarpments to conserve arable land. A village is approached via a path leading to a narrow gateway, and the village rises to the crown of the hill with a few lateral paths and many zig-zagging trails accessing houses. A thatched roof mosque with a square pyramid or double pyramid mosque forms the centre of the village.

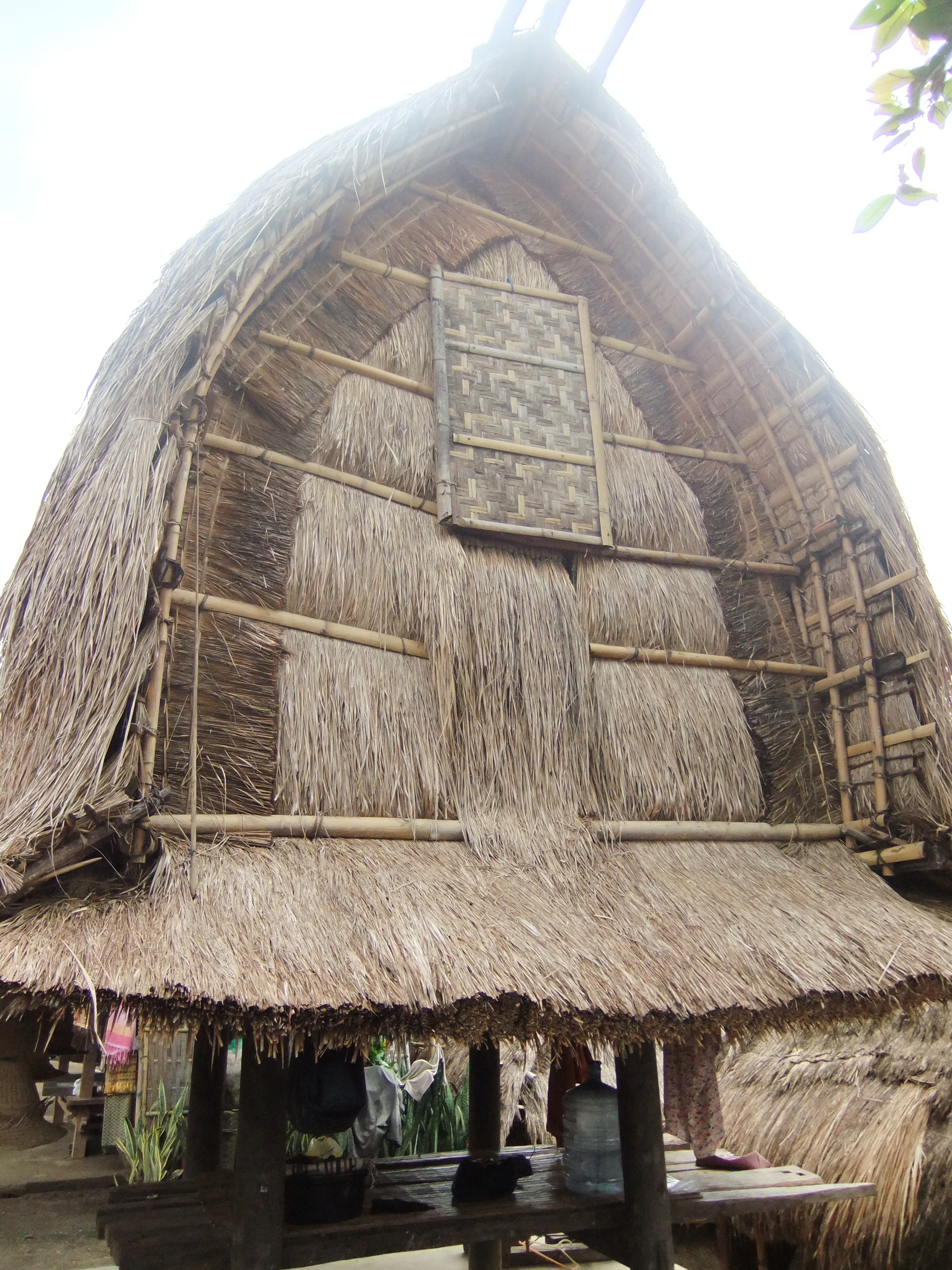
Lumbung rice barn

== Lumbung ==
Pile-built, bonnet-rice barns known as lumbung are the pride of Sasak vernacular architecture. They are built in rows along the easier lower paths of a village. The structures have only one opening, which is a high window into which rice is loaded twice a year. Four 1.5 metre hardwood posts are mounted on a level, sundried mud and buffalo-dung platform, and discs known as jelepreng are set towards the top to prevent rodent ingress. Two lateral beams are carried by the posts on which sits a cantilevered frame which in turn supports the bamboo rafters.

Several lumbung owned by separate families are built end to end a few metres apart.

== See also ==
- Architecture of Indonesia
