= Bimanese people =

Ethnic group in Indonesia

Dou Mbojo
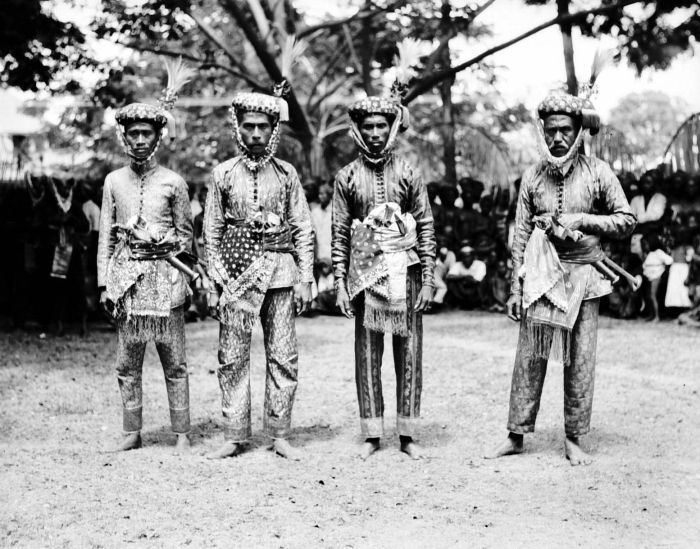
- The Bimanese people, early 20th century.

Total population
- c. 510,000 (2000)

Regions with significant populations
- Indonesia (West Nusa Tenggara; Sumbawa Island)

Languages
- Bimanese and Indonesian

Religion
- Islam (predominantly); Christianity and animism (minority)

Related ethnic groups
- Dompuan • Sumbawa • Sasak • Sumba • Manggarai other Austronesian peoples

The Bimanese (Note: /ˌbiːməˈniːz/ BEE-muh-NEEZ) (Bima: Dou Mbojo; Indonesian: Orang Bima) are an Austronesian ethnic group native to the eastern part of Sumbawa Island in West Nusa Tenggara province of Indonesia. With a population approaching a million people, they are the second largest ethnic group in West Nusa Tenggara.

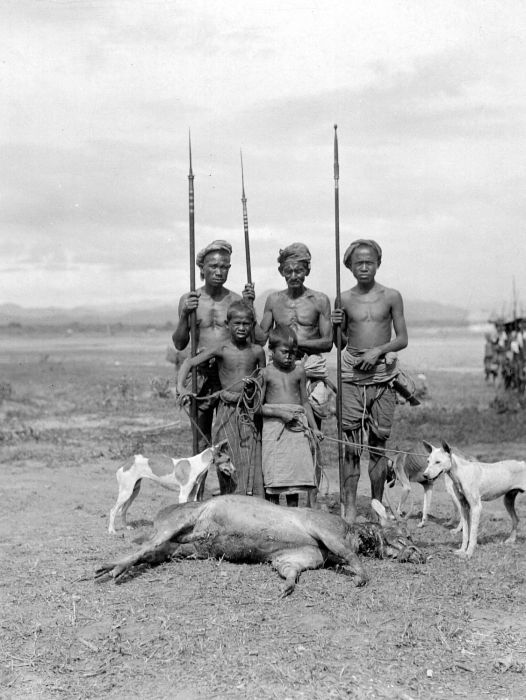
Bimanese people hunting, circa 20th century.

== Society ==
The Bimanese live in the villages of the regencies of the Bima and Dompu, and in the city of Bima. Apart from that, they can also be found in Sumbawa Regency, especially in the districts of Empang, Plampang, Lape, Lopok, and Taliwang. The main occupations of the rural population are wet rice farming, animal husbandry and fishing. Swidden farming is still found among highland communities. Urban Bimanese practice a wide range of professions, including trade and local administration. Tourism also increasingly plays an important role due to the proximity of the Komodo National Park. Among entrepreneurs there are many descendants from intermarriages with members of historical immigrant communities (especially Arabs, but also Chinese).

Sunni Islam is the predominant religion of the Bimanese. Lowlanders are known as fervent adherents of Islam, while among the mountain communities of the Dou Donggo (meaning mountain people) and Dou Wawo, indigenous folk beliefs still play a strong role in everyday life, since they were able to fend off the Muslim invaders, due to the mountain regions of Bima which they occupied, as well as their being fierce warriors. They were therefore granted a semi-autonomous stats within the Sultanate of Bima. The Dou Donggo were thereby able to avoid their culture from being subverted by Islam, whilst retaining certain political privileges, as well as their indigenous practices. Some Dou Donggo communities converted to Catholicism in the mid-20th century. Although most of the Dou Donggo adopted either Christianity or Islam, this was but for a tacit adoption, for as a Catholic priest put it: "The people are 70% Muslim, 30% Catholic, and 90% kaffir [pagan]", implying that, in reality, people retained their indigenous religious beliefs.

In the 1980s, the Dou Donggo people's economy was undergoing great change, due to rapid population growth, caused by the introduction medicine, which made swidden farming untenable. This was because swidden farming relied on the ability of the fertility of the land being regenerated, something that required 1–2 years at least. However, with the increasing population density, too much stress has been put on the land, not allowing it to fully regenerate. The Dou Donggo peoples therefore needed to change from relying on the subsistent farming of swidden rice, millet and maize, towards the cultivation of wet rice in terraced paddy fields and the cultivation of cash crops such as peanuts and soybean, which were to be sold in the lowlands of Bima island.

== History ==
Before the spread of Islam to most coastal regions in the Malay Archipelago, several small polities in the Bima area belonged to the influence sphere of the Majapahit Empire, and later had close cultural and political ties with the Kingdom of Gowa in Sulawesi. Introduction of Islam is attributed in local traditions to the Malay merchants. The Sultanate of Bima was established in the early seventeenth century under the influence of the Sultanate of Gowa.

== Language ==
The Bimanese (including the highland groups) speak the Bimanese language, which belongs to the Austronesian language family. It is closely related to the languages of Flores and Sumba further to the east, and only distantly to the Sumbawa language that is spoken on the western half of Sumbawa island.

== Gallery ==
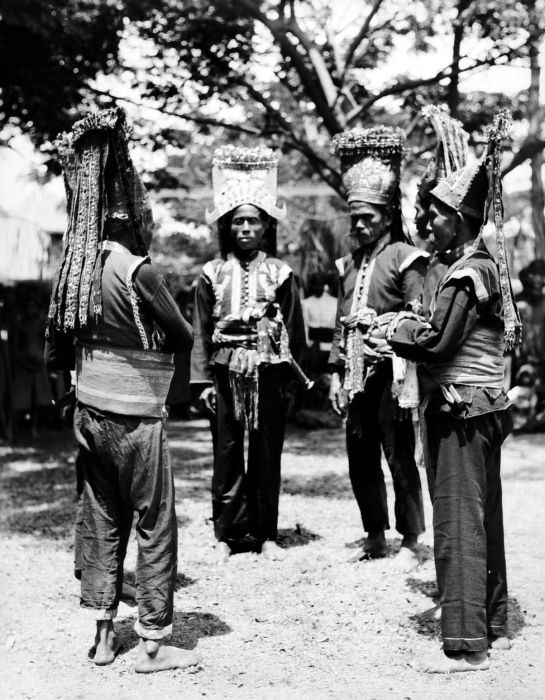
Employees of the court of Bima, Sumbawa, between 1925 and 1932.

== See also ==
- Sumbawa Island
- Sumbawa people
- Austronesian expansion
- Manggarai people

== Bibliography ==
- Hitchcock, Michael (1995). "Inter-Ethnic Relations and Tourism in Bima, Sumbawa". Sojourn: Journal of Social Issues in Southeast Asia. 10 (2): 233–258. JSTOR 41056913.
- Monaghan, John; Just, Peter (2000). Social and Cultural Anthropology: A Very Short Introduction. Oxford University Press. doi:10.1093/actrade/9780192853462.001.0001. ISBN 978-0-19-285346-2.
- Suryadinata, Leo; Arifin, Evi Nurvidya; Ananta, Aris (2003). Indonesia's Population: Ethnicity and Religion in a Changing Political Landscape. Singapore: Institute of Southeast Asian Studies. ISBN 9789812302120.
- Haris, Tawalinuddin (1997). Kerajaan Tradisional di Indonesia: Bima (in Indonesian). Jakarta: Departemen Pendidikan dan Kebudayaan Republik Indonesia.
