= Bayan Beleq Mosque =

Mosque in Lombok, West Nusa Tenggara, Indonesia

- Masjid Bayan Beleq
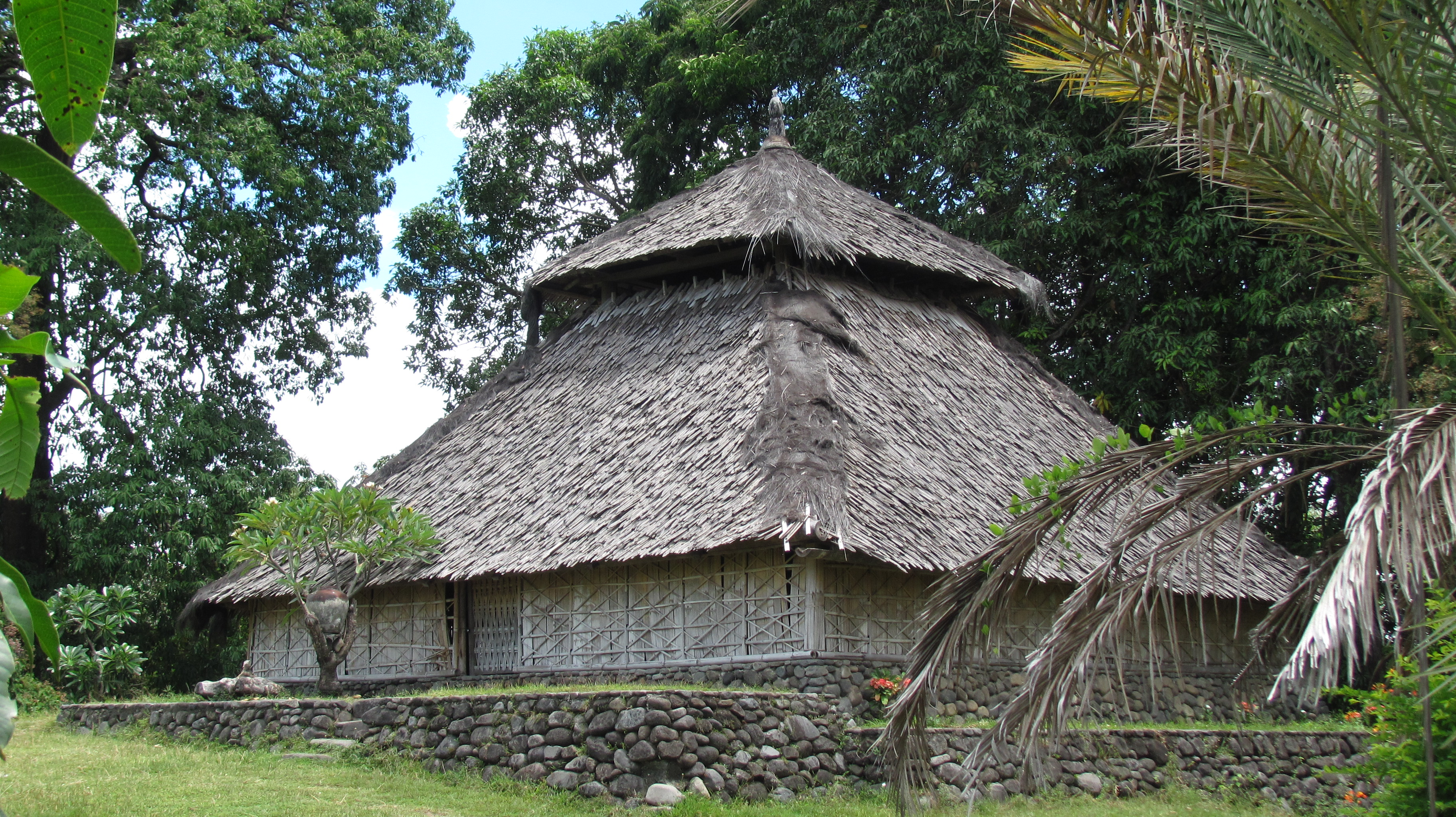
- The mosque building can be seen from the outside

Religion
- Affiliation: Islam
- Branch/tradition: Wetu Telu
- Status: Active

Location
- Location: Anyar - Batas Lotim Street, Bayan, Bayan Subdistrict, North Lombok
- Country: Indonesia
- Interactive map of Bayan Beleq Mosque
- Coordinates: 8°15′59.83″S 116°25′37.78″E

Architecture
- Type: Mosque architecture
- Style: Sasak
- Completed: 1634
- Dome: One

Bayan Beleq Mosque (Indonesian: Masjid Bayan Beleq) is the oldest mosque on the island of Lombok, Indonesia, reportedly dating back to the 17th century. It is located in Bayan village.

== See also ==
- Islam in Indonesia
- List of mosques in Indonesia
