= Sumbawa people =

Sumbawa people Sumbawans
Tau Samawa ᨈᨘ ᨔᨆᨓ
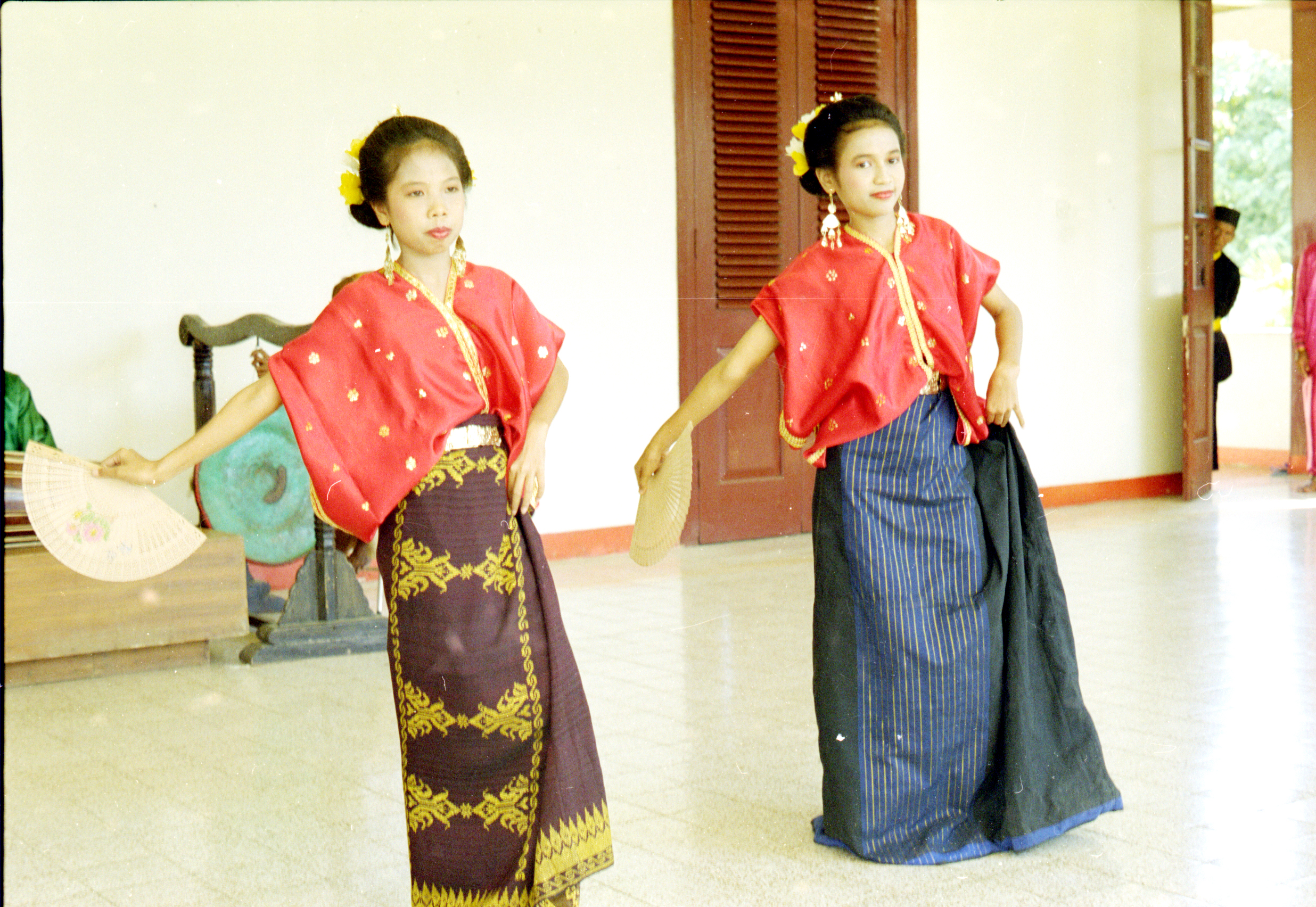
- Child dancers, Sumbawa

Total population
- 477,000

Regions with significant populations
- Indonesia (West Nusa Tenggara; Sumbawa Island)

Languages
- Native Sumbawa, also Indonesian, Arabic (religious only)

Religion
- Mostly Sunni Islam

Related ethnic groups
- Austronesian peoples Dompu • Bimanese • Sasak • Balinese • Bali Aga

The Sumbawa people (Note: /suːmˈbɑːwə/ soom-BAH-wə) (Sumbawa: Tau Samawa, Satera Jontal script: ᨈᨘ ᨔᨆᨓ; Indonesian: Orang Sumbawa) or Sumbawan are an ethnic group of people native to the western and central region of Sumbawa Island, which comprises West Sumbawa Regency and Sumbawa Regency province of West Nusa Tenggara, Indonesia. Their language is the Sumbawa language an Austronesian language. Neither the Bimanese nor the Sumbawa people have alphabets of their own; they use the alphabets of the Bugis and the Malay language indifferently. The majority of the Sumbawa people practice Islam. The Sumbawa people once established their own government which became the Kingdom of Sumbawa/Sumbawa Sultanate and lasted until 1931.

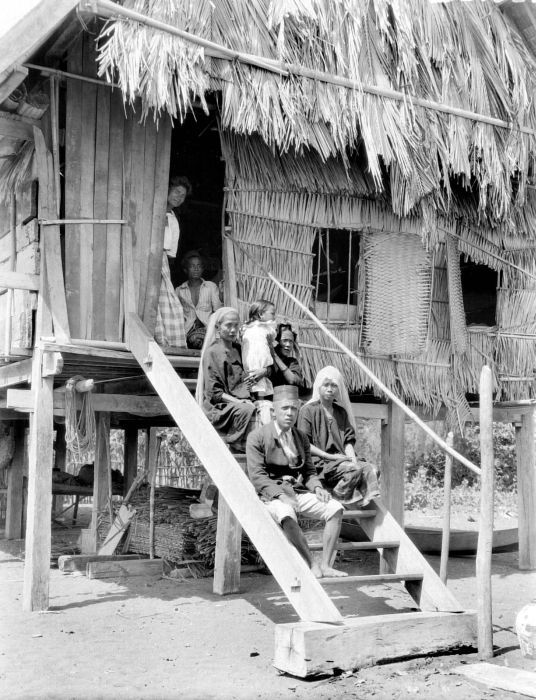
A Sumbawa family on the stairs of their home, pre-1943.

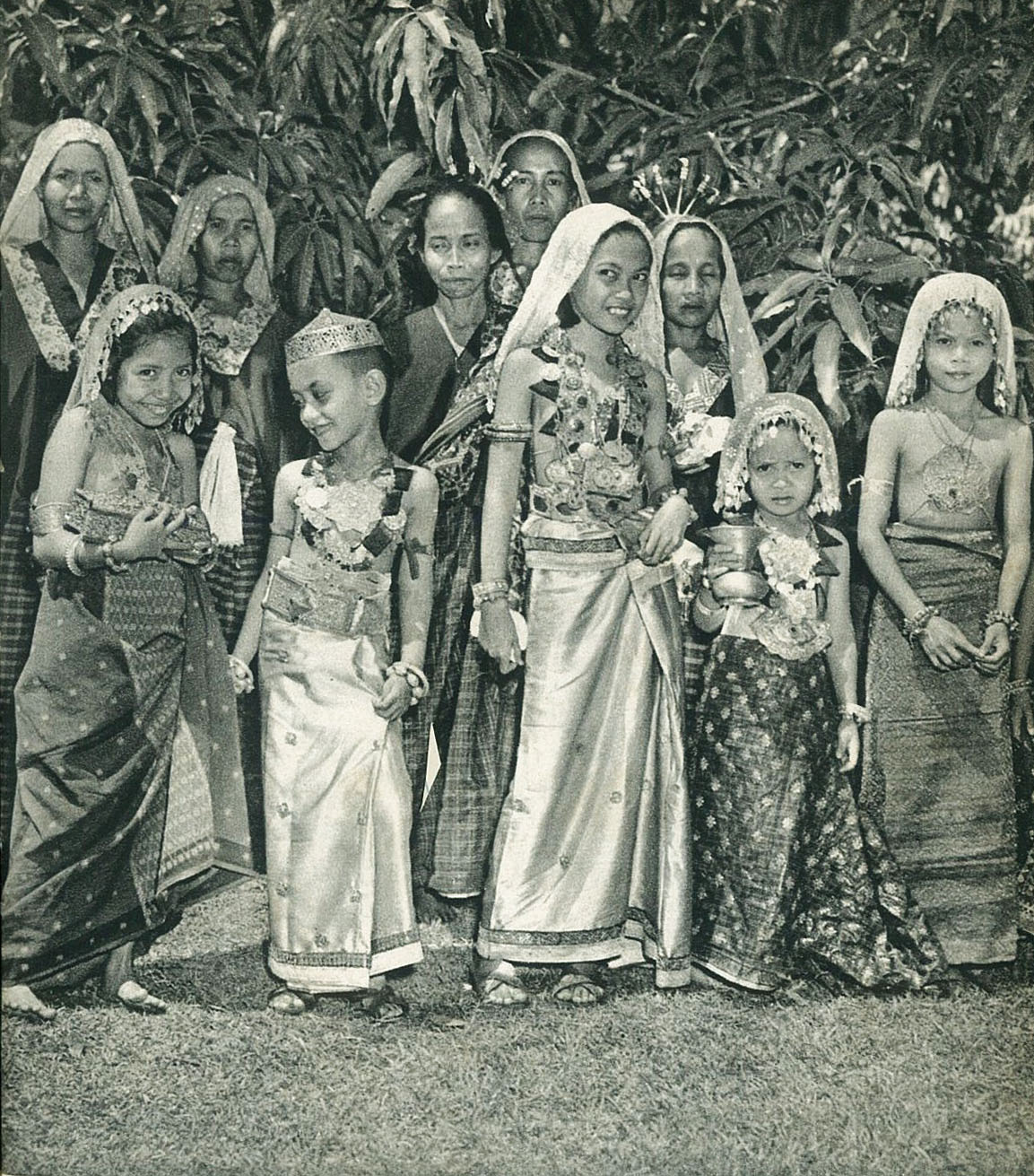
Children of the Sultan of Sumbawa Besar

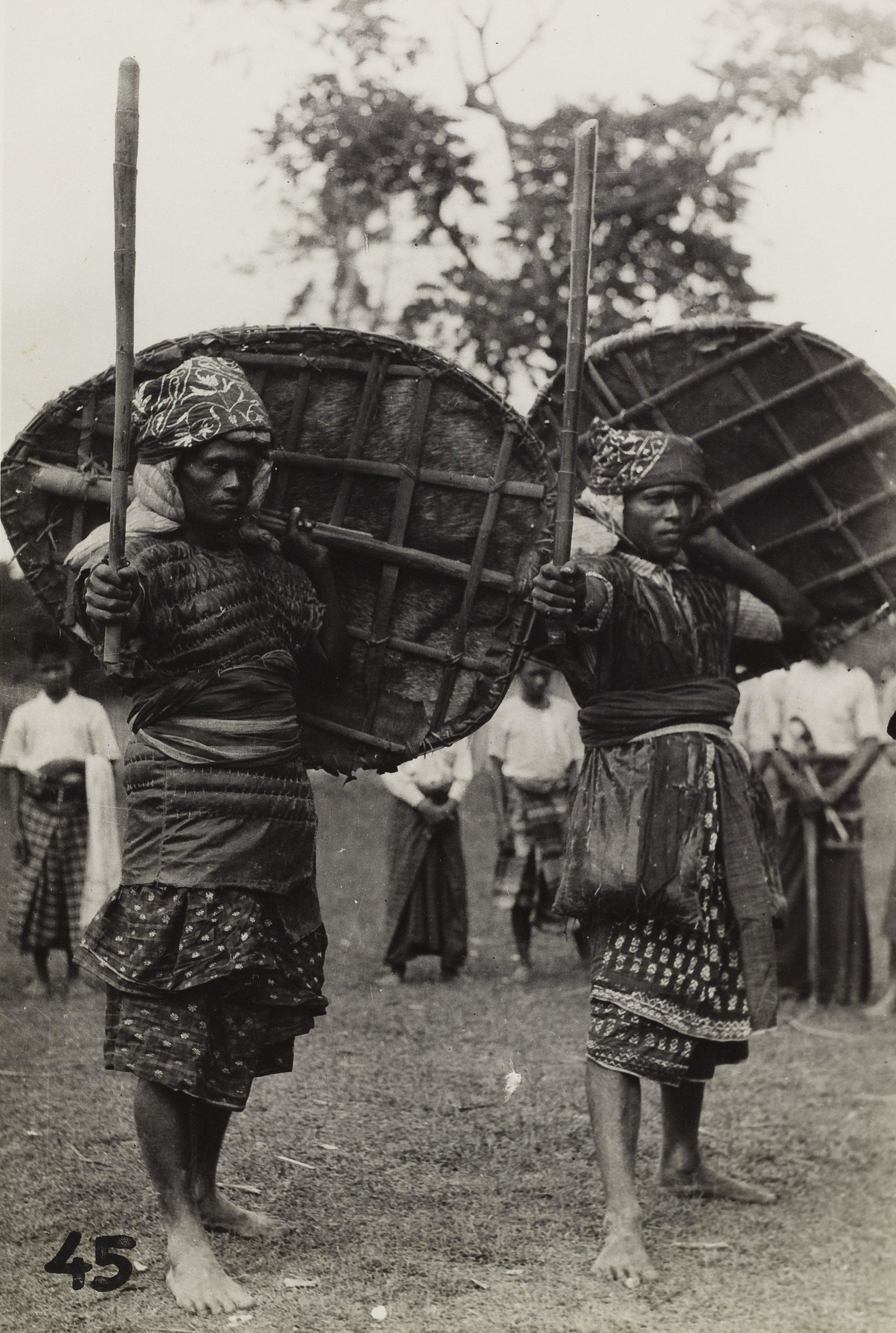
Sumbawa tribe warriors or soldiers on Sumbawa Island c. 1930

== History ==
The Sumbawa people inhabit the western part of the Sumbawa Island and about another 38 smaller islands. In the eastern borders, the Sumbawa people are closely related to the Bima people. The Sumbawa people descended from the ancient Austronesian people that came to the island thousands of years ago. In the 14th century, the western part of the Sumbawa Island is regarded as a territory dependent on the Javanese Majapahit kingdom. Later the formation of the West Sumbawa government became dependent on the Bali Kingdom. In 1650–1750, the West Sumbawa sultans themselves became possessors of lands at the nearby Lombok Island.

In the 17th century, Islam was spread among the Sumbawa people. However this influence only gained significant importance in the 19th century in relation to the reforms that were carried out by the local monarch to strengthen their power after the catastrophic Tambora eruption. Thus, they have also contributed to the cultural unification of the local population.

As early as the 16th century, the Sumbawa people have been known to be suppliers of valuable fragrant wood, honey, rice and horses to other countries within the Southeast Asian region. Since 1605, they were already actively trading with the Dutch. Thanks to the Dutch traders in the Sumbawa Island, the locals began to grow coffee; which then became the main export produce. In the 19th century, the governing of the Sumbawa people came under the Dutch colonies. In 1949, West Sumbawa became part of Indonesia.

== Religion ==
Most of the Sumbawa people practice Sunni Islam faith, but among the Sumbawa people, some of the ancient cults, traditional beliefs and rituals are still preserved. The Sumbawa people still believe in the existence of many spirits and witchcraft. Their shamans have a certain social influence; who act as counselors and witch doctors.

== Culture ==
Sumbawa folklore consist of a lot of fairy tales, legends, historical tales, nursery rhymes, dance and musical performance. The Sakeco music always plays a special role in the custom of Sumbawa people.

=== Economy ===
The main livelihood of the Sumbawa people are agriculture and animal husbandry. They usually cultivate the earth by slash-and-burn method. Plow and irrigation methods are very rarely used. The main agriculture produce is rice, which is predominantly used in their dietary. Sumbawa people traditionally grow corn (which has become a major industry), beans, peppers, vegetables, onions, garlic, tobacco, coffee and fruit trees, which are also grown primarily for trading. Horse and cattle breeding is dominant in livestock breeding, but the breeding of buffaloes, small horned livestock and poultry are also developed. Aquaculture are carried out in flooded fields and artificial ponds. In forestry, wild nuts, beeswax and frankincense are gathered.

=== Dietary ===
Sumbawa people eat mostly plant based foods, while consumption of meat takes place during festivals and other celebrations.

=== Settlements ===
The Sumbawa villages are characterized by the so-called scattered houses, when settlements are actually made up of separate estates. They live in permanent settlements, as well as in temporary ones. Large villages are divided into several smaller rukun warga, each of which has its own administration. However, the villagers are united together in a form of community to collectively deal with problems of land use and irrigation. Temporary building shelters are found in the mountainous areas that are free from the jungle areas. Traditional framed houses on stilts with high roofing is divided into several rooms- generally 4 to 6 rooms. There is no ceiling, instead an attic is made over the female part of the house. In the fields, temporary settlements are often located; where women, old people and children also reside.

=== Society ===
Traditionally, the society is divided into three groups namely, the relatives of the monarchy family, the nobles and the free person of ordinary commoners. Dominated by smaller nucleus family, but the family maintained close ties up to the sixth generation. Tracing of family tree is conducted simultaneously from both the male and female line.

A traditional family is monogamous. However in principle polygamy is not forbidden in religion, but it is practiced quite rarely because of the big sum of money that the bridegroom must pay for the bride and usually common among the upper class. Elements of the traditional wedding such as a long series of ceremonies and engagement have been preserved, such as bride price, a joint bathing ceremony of the bride and groom and a common dining table. The bride must receive the blessing of their parents. In the past, newlyweds that did not receive parental blessings are regarded as an insult to the relatives and become refugees of mandatory persecution.

== See also ==
- Sumbawa Island
- Bimanese people
- Austronesian expansion
- Savu people
