= Crescent Star Party =

Crescent Star Party may refer to:

- Crescent Star Party (Indonesia)
- Crescent Star Party (Turkey)
