= Wetu Telu =

Indonesian sect of Islam

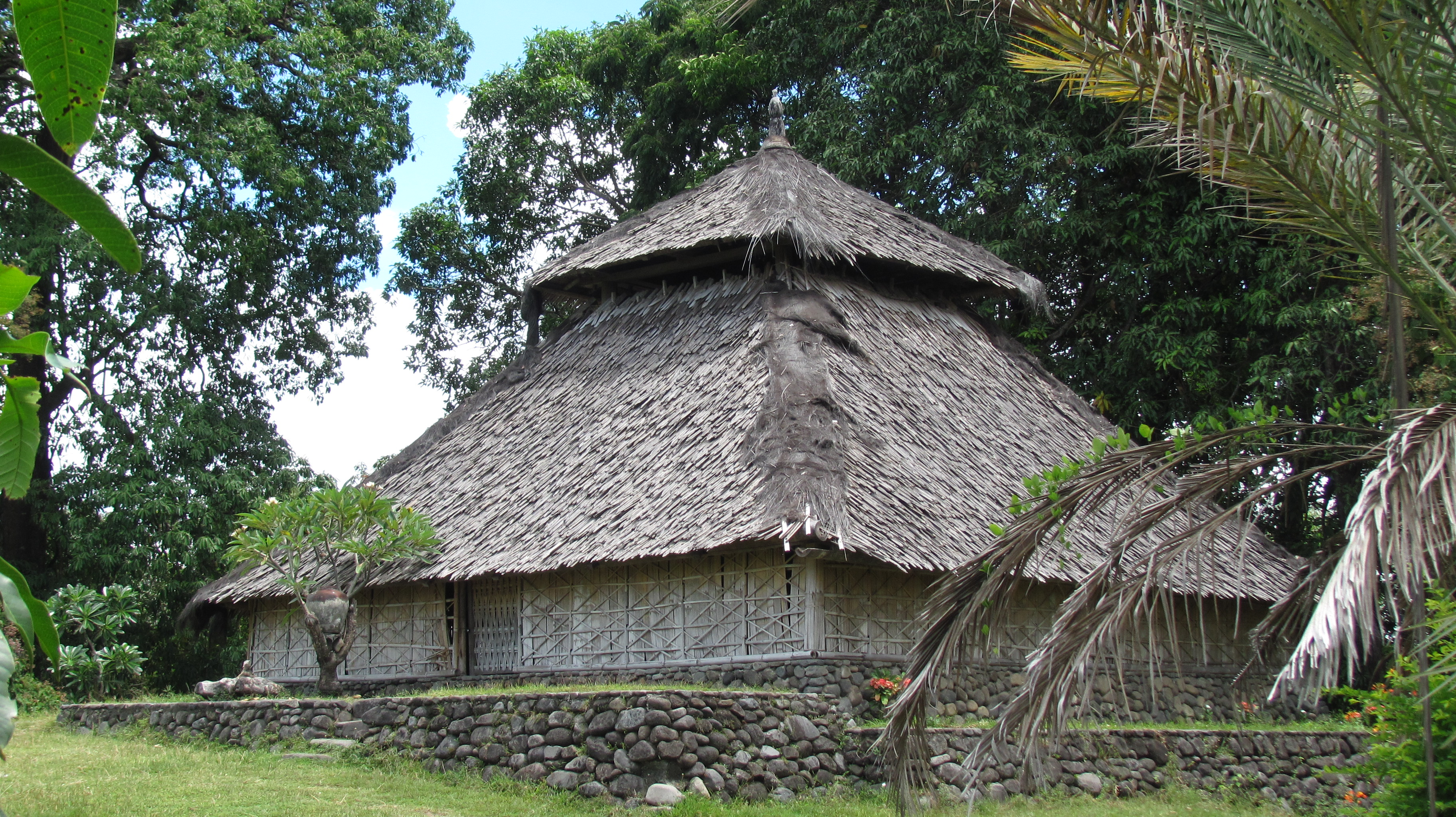
Bayan Beleq Mosque, a traditional Wetu Tulu mosque in Bayan, Lombok, Indonesia, and the oldest mosque on the island, dating back to the 17th century.

Wetu Telu (lit. 'Three Times') is a sect of Islam practiced by a minority of the Sasak people of Lombok, Indonesia. Practitioners pray three times a day, which differs from orthodox Sunni Islam (Waktu Lima, lit. 'Five Times') in which practitioners pray five times a day. Adherents of Wetu Telu also only practice three of the Five Pillars of Islam, namely, Shahada (Declaration of Faith), Salah (Prayer), and Sawm (Fasting during Ramadan), omitting the obligations of Hajj (Pilgrimage to Mecca) and Zakat (Almsgiving). These practices can be represented by a kyai as a religious leader of the community. Wetu Telu also incorporates some native beliefs of ancestral worship and animism.

== Works cited ==
- Budiwanti, Erni (2000). Islam Sasak: Wetu Telu versus Waktu Lima (in Indonesian). Yogyakarta: PT LKiS Pelangi Aksara. ISBN 9789798966514.
- Cederroth, Sven (1998). Gunawan Tjahjono (ed.). Religion and Ritual. Indonesian Heritage. Vol. 9. Singapore: Archipelago Press. ISBN 9813018585.
- Cederroth, Sven (1995). A Sacred Cloth Religion?: Ceremonies of the Big Feast Among the Wetu Telu Sasak (Lombok, Indonesia). NIAS Report series no. 10 (revised ed.). Singapore: NIAS Press. ISBN 9788787062541. ISSN 0904-597X.
- Müller, Kal (1997). Pickell, David (ed.). East of Bali: From Lombok to Timor. The Periplus Adventure Guides Series. Singapore: Tuttle Publishing. ISBN 9789625931784.
- Waterson, Roxana (1998). Gunawan Tjahjono (ed.). Architecture. Indonesian Heritage. Vol. 6. Singapore: Archipelago Press. ISBN 9813018305.
