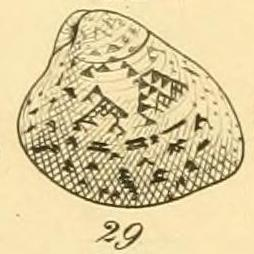
- 1842 illustration from An illustrated and descriptive catalogue of recent bivalve shells

Scientific classification
- Kingdom: Animalia
- Phylum: Mollusca
- Class: Bivalvia
- Order: Venerida
- Family: Veneridae
- Genus: Lioconcha
- Species: L. hieroglyphica

Binomial name
- Lioconcha hieroglyphica (Conrad, 1837)

Synonyms
- Cytherea hieroglyphica; Circe hieroglyphica

= Lioconcha hieroglyphica =

Species of bivalve

Lioconcha hieroglyphica is a species of saltwater clam, a marine bivalve mollusc in the family Veneridae, the venus clams.

== Description ==
The shell of Lioconcha hieroglyphica reaches a maximum length of about 42 mm. The shape of the shell is trigonal with a truncated posterior. The anterodorsal margin is acutely rounded. The linule is elongated and heart-shaped. It has tan to dark brown rod-like and angular markings, often with the appearance of cuneiform or hieroglyphs. The markings may be the result of a diffusion-mediated chemical cellular automaton, like Conus textile's. The shell is white on the inside.

It is sometimes confused with Lioconcha castrensis.

== Distribution ==
This species is found in the waters around Hawaii, the Philippines, and the Marshall Islands.

== Additional reading ==
- Huber M. (2010) Compendium of bivalves. A full-color guide to 3,300 of the world's marine bivalves. A status on Bivalvia after 250 years of research. Hackenheim: ConchBooks. 901 pp., 1
