= Sail Indonesia =

Sport competition

Sail Indonesia is a series of sailing and other events for yachts conducted each year in Indonesia. The events are organised by Yayasan Cinta Bahari Indonesia (YCBI) and supported by the high-profile tourist destinations to international yachtsmen and women with a view to expanding the tourism potential and raising awareness of the region as well as introducing visitors to natural and cultural features of the Indonesian archipelago that they might otherwise not visit.

The sailing event started in 2001, and has been held annually ever since. The latest event is being held in the name as 2018 Sail Moyo Tambora centering around Moyo Island and Mount Tambora of West Nusa Tenggara province.

== Route ==
Sail Indonesia begins each year with a yacht rally from Darwin in Australia to Kupang in Indonesia towards the end of July. Following their arrival at Kupang, yachts are invited to a number of events there and at locations on the islands of Alor, Lembata, Flores, Sulawesi, Borneo, Bali, Karimunjava, Java, and Batam before they leave Indonesian waters and head for Singapore, Malaysia, and Thailand. The local government administration of many of these islands plan a number of events at each stopover many of which include a ceremonial welcome and dinner as well as cultural and arts displays, traditional sports, tours, and dance performances. See rally map on Sail Indonesia site.

== Participants ==
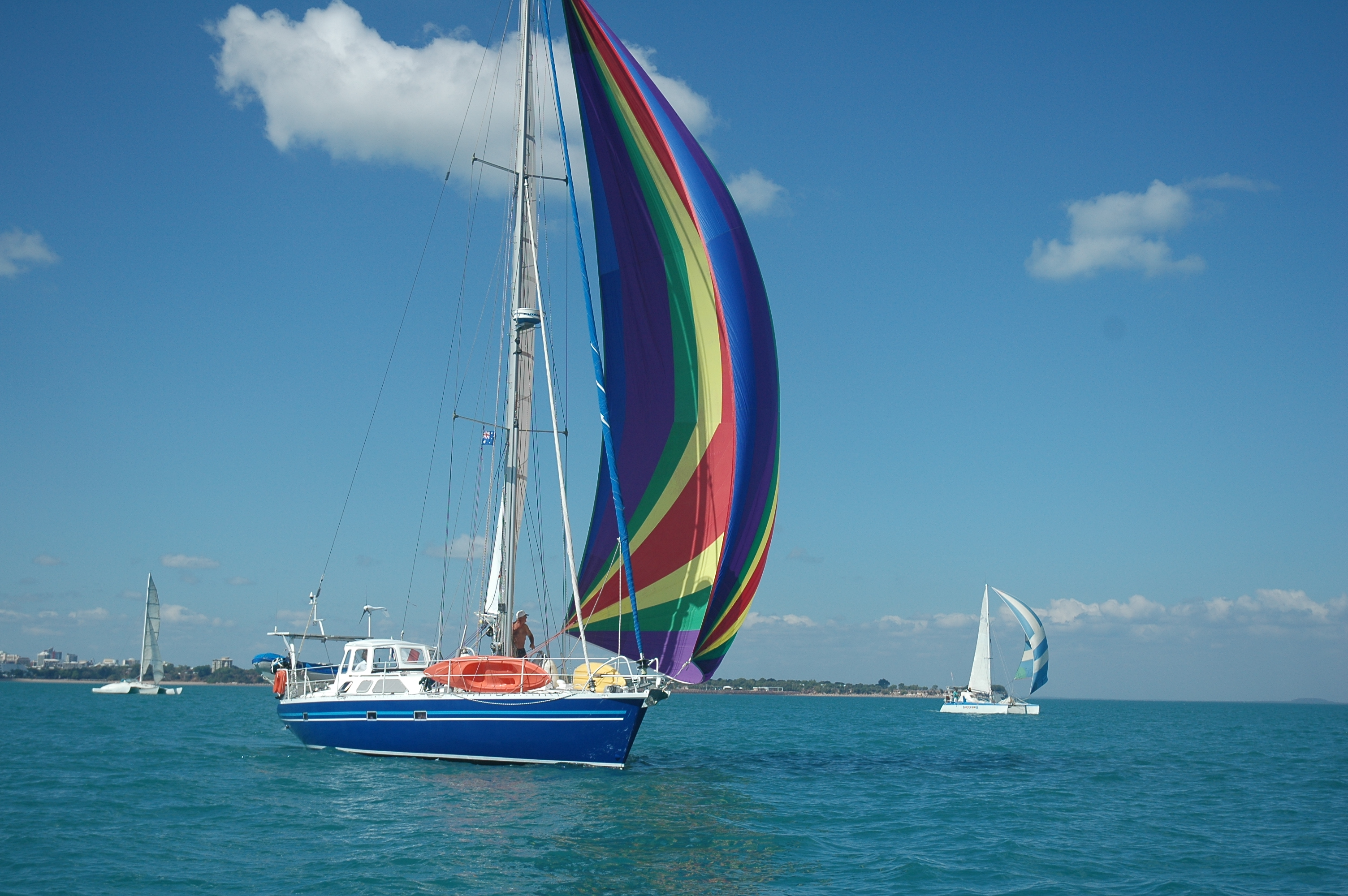
Maine - France - 2006

Participants are often undertaking a circumnavigation sailing around the world. A wide range of yachts of all sizes (ranging from 31 to 80 feet in length) and all types including monohulls, catamarans, and trimarans flying flags from many countries take part. For example, in 2006, yachts from Australia, Britain, New Zealand, Canada, Germany, South Africa, United States, Finland, Hong Kong, Denmark, Netherlands, France, Indonesia, Vanuatu, Switzerland, and Sweden participated. Skippers and crew are also drawn from diverse sources and range in age from the very young to mature age.

== History ==
In December 2000, as a result of an initiative from the Indonesian Ministry of Tourism and Aji Sularso from the Indonesian Ministry of Maritime Affairs, it was decided to arrange a co-ordinated series of yacht races and rallies originating from both Darwin and Fremantle to Bali, then on to Pulau Seribu north of Jakarta and then to Batam just south of Singapore. Sail Indonesia was formed to manage the technical aspects of these events and to keep costs down since these events were promoted and organised using the internet and email only. As a result, in July 2001 a fleet of 16 yachts left Darwin for Bali, however the fleet from Fremantle did not eventuate. The 2001 event was a success and plans were made for a second event in 2002. The 2002 event attracted a total of 20 yachts and this too was regarded as a success with a send off party in Darwin and a formal reception and presentation dinner in Bali.

Following the 2002 Darwin to Bali Race discussions were held in Bali regarding the possibility of including sailing destinations in Indonesia to the east of Bali because the yachts that had gone direct to Bali had missed the beautiful cruising areas in the waters of the islands to the east, including Timor, Alor, Lembata, Flores, Rinca, Komodo, Sumbawa and Lombok. In February 2003 at a meeting in Bali the Central Government in Jakarta represented by GAHAWISRI, the Indonesian Federation of Marine Tour Operators discussions were held to raise awareness of tourism, especially marine tourism in the eastern provinces of Indonesia. As a result, Sail Indonesia was asked to arrange a yacht rally from Darwin to Kupang in 2003 to be run in conjunction with the Darwin to Bali Race. In July 2003 two fleets left Darwin with 23 yachts going direct to Bali and 24 yachts going to Kupang. The two events ran together in 2003 and again in 2004, however in 2005 due to lack of interest by yachts taking the direct route to Bali, that event was cancelled and 69 yachts went direct to Kupang. Kupang becoming the eastern gateway for yachts sailing into Indonesia.

As the result of the efforts of Raymond Lesmana from YCBI following the Darwin to Kupang Rally, Sail Indonesia now offers a series of events for the participants throughout Indonesia in Alor, Lembata, Riung, Labuan Bajo, Makassar, Bali, Kumai and Karimun Java. At each location the Local Government Offices arrange a number of art and cultural displays, tours and dinners. All these events are a result of these Indonesian Government initiatives and support, they are all very new and are being developed, improved and added to on an ongoing basis. These events enable participants to visit unique places away from the well worn tourist areas and experience unspoiled island life. Sail Indonesia has increased in popularity every year and in 2006 a total of 96 yachts participated. 140 expressions of interest had been received for the 2007 event at the start of the year.

== Themes ==
Every year the routes are different and have their own theme.

- 2009 Sail Bunaken, with the largest ever number of participants - 127 ships took part.
- 2010 Sail Banda.
- 2011 Sail Wakatobi-Belitung, the eight consecutive years of Sail Indonesia without any break; 109 ships took part - the second largest number of participants after 2009.
- 2012 Sail Morotai.
- 2013 Sail Komodo.
- 2014 Sail Raja Ampat.
- 2015 Sail Tomini.
- 2016 Sail Selat Karimata.
- 2017 Sail Sabang.
- 2018 Sail Moyo Tambora.

== See also ==
- Fremantle to Bali yacht race
