= Satonda Island =

Island north of Sumbawa in Dompu Regency, Indonesia

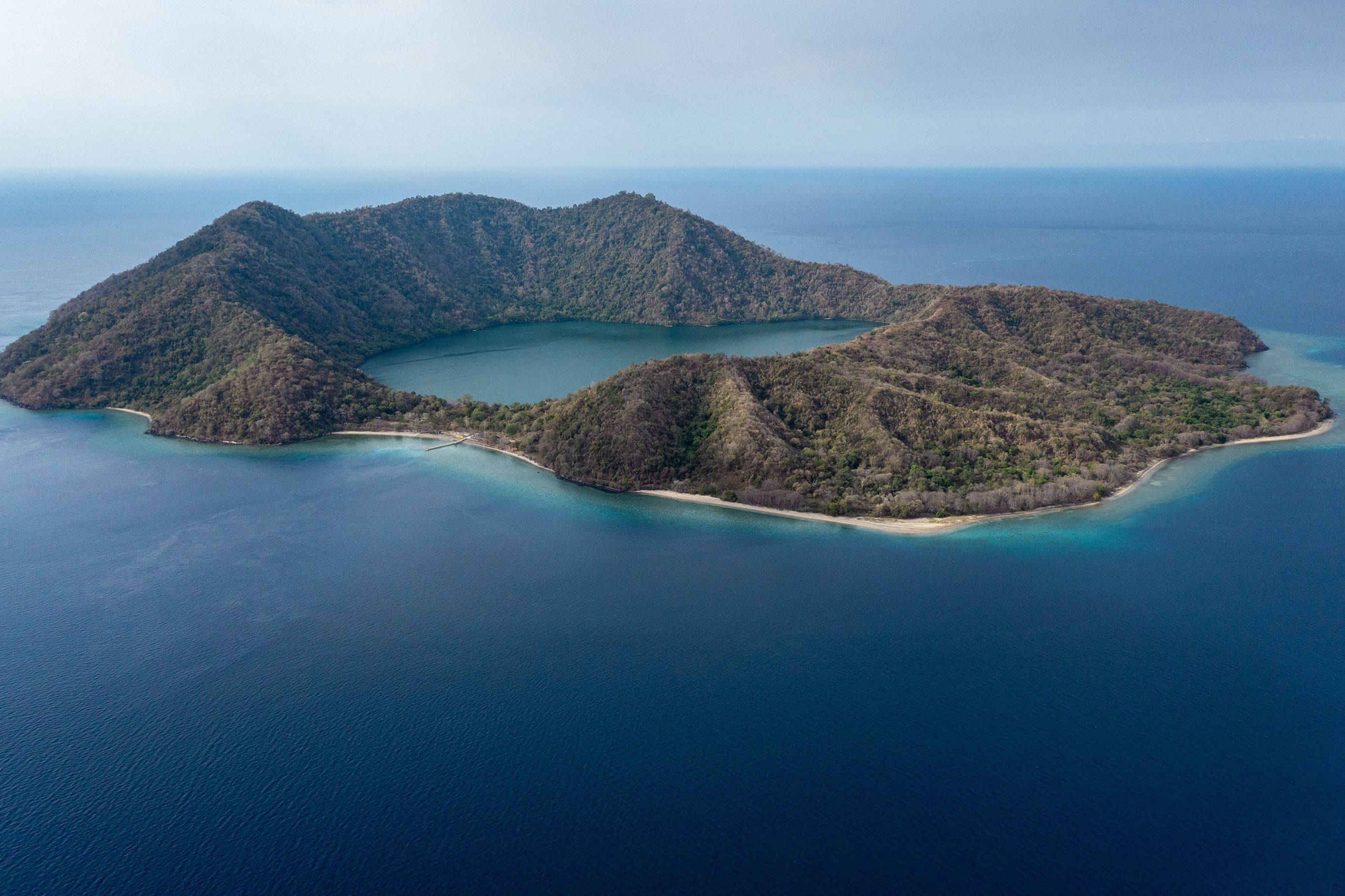
- Interactive map of Satonda Island

Geography
- Location: South East Asia
- Coordinates: 8°06′41″S 117°44′46″E
- Archipelago: Lesser Sunda Islands

Administration
- Indonesia
- Province: West Nusa Tenggara
- Regency: Dompu
- District: Pekat

Demographics
- Ethnic groups: Sumbawa people

Satonda is a volcanic island off the northern coast of Sumbawa, in West Nusa Tenggara province of Indonesia. The lake on the island has helped to gain some insight in the formation of organisms.

== Location ==
Satonda is situated north of Sumbawa island and west of Moyo Island, in the Flores Sea, 3 km east of the Balahai (or Sanggar) Strait that separates both these islands, and less than 30 km north-west of the Tambora volcano

Administratively, it is part of Pekat District, in Dompu Regency, (Note: The Ministry of Environment and Forestry of Indonesia places it in the Nangamiro Village area; this does not agree with the nomor.net source and needs verification.)

== Description ==
The island is about 3 x 2 km in size, with an elongated axis oriented NW-SE. The caldera is about 2 x 2 km and its walls rise to about 300 m. A 77 hectares (190.3 acres) lake occupies the caldera. At one point on the south side, the height of the crater rim is reduced to 13 m altitude and its width is reduced to about 30 m.

Satonda Island has a vast natural coral reef in the surrounding waters and was designated a Marine Nature Park (TWAL) in 1999 by the Ministry of Forestry of Indonesia. The island is proposed to be part of Moyo Satonda National Park along with neighbouring Moyo Island.

== Satonda volcano ==
The volcano rises from a depth of about 1,000 m underwater, with the steep slope typical of tuff cones. Its caldera is about 2 x 2 km large and the caldera walls rise up to 300 m above sea level. The eastern wall is very steep and has no vegetation.

The Sangeang Api (island of Sangeang) and Satonda are eruption centers associated with the Tambora volcano — and therefore to the phenomenal 10–15 April 1815 eruption of Mount Tambora which ejected 50km^{3} of rock (150 km^{3} of pumice and pyroclastics) and affected a large part of the Earth. (Note: The 1815 eruption of Mount Tambora rocked several parts of the world, spewing dust and polluting the Earth’s atmosphere for many years, even tearing the ozone layer. Although estimates vary, it death toll was at least 71,000 people, of which 11,000–12,000 were killed directly by the eruption. But this may be grossly underestimated, as it is said that on Sumbawa alone, 92,000 people died because of the eruption or because of the following famine. Its effects also resulted in climate change which led to eight weeks of nonstop rain in the UK, and has been cited as a reason for the severity of the 1816–19 typhus epidemic in southeast Europe and the eastern Mediterranean that killed about 65,000 people, and for the “Year Without a Summer”.)

Signs of erosion such as the marine terraces to the south of the island, and steep gullies (deep erosional ravines in the tuff ring), indicate that the volcano has been inactive since several thousand years, and maybe tens of thousands of years. The volcano may have been formed when the sea level was lower, during the last ice age

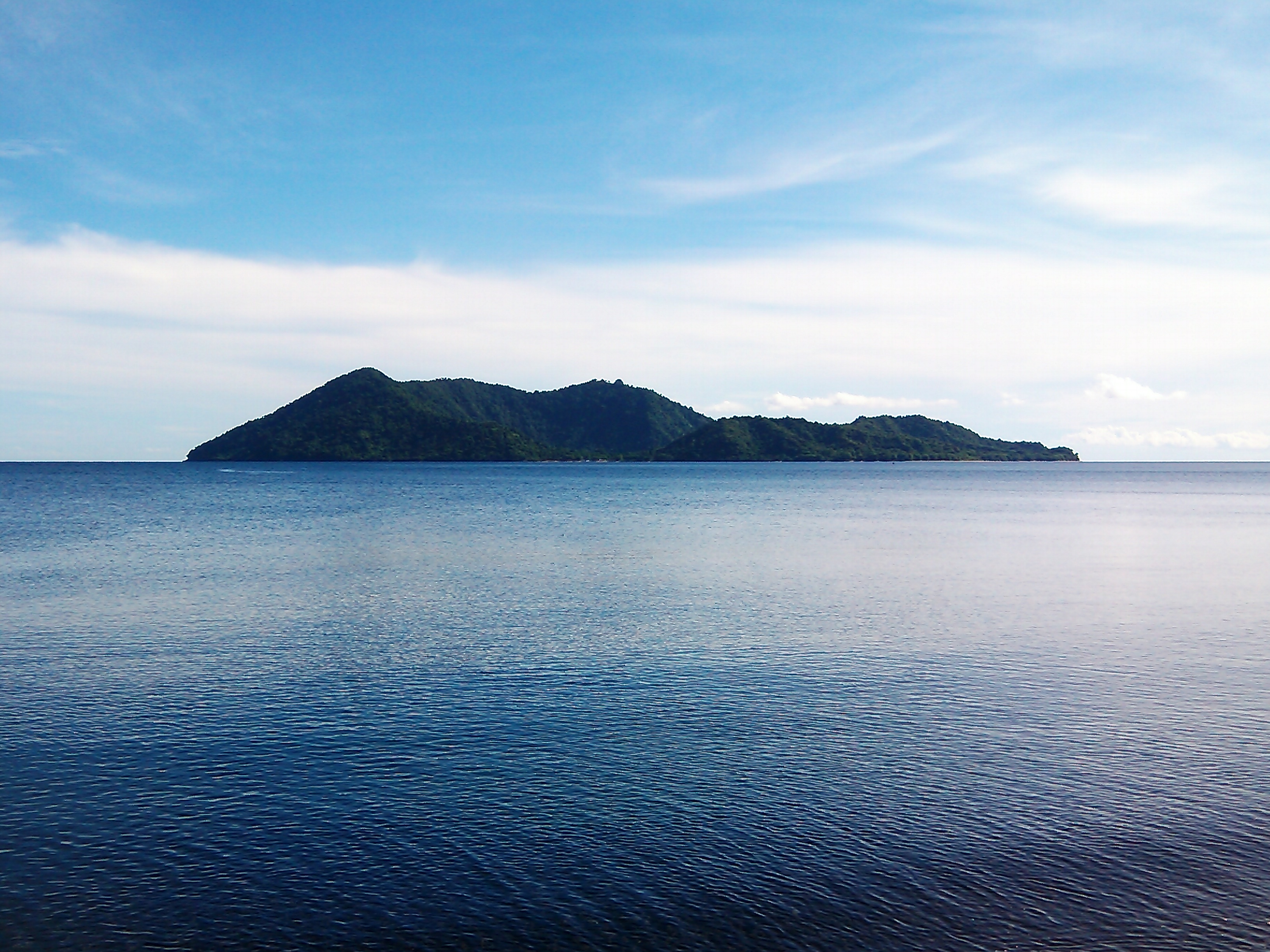

== The lake ==
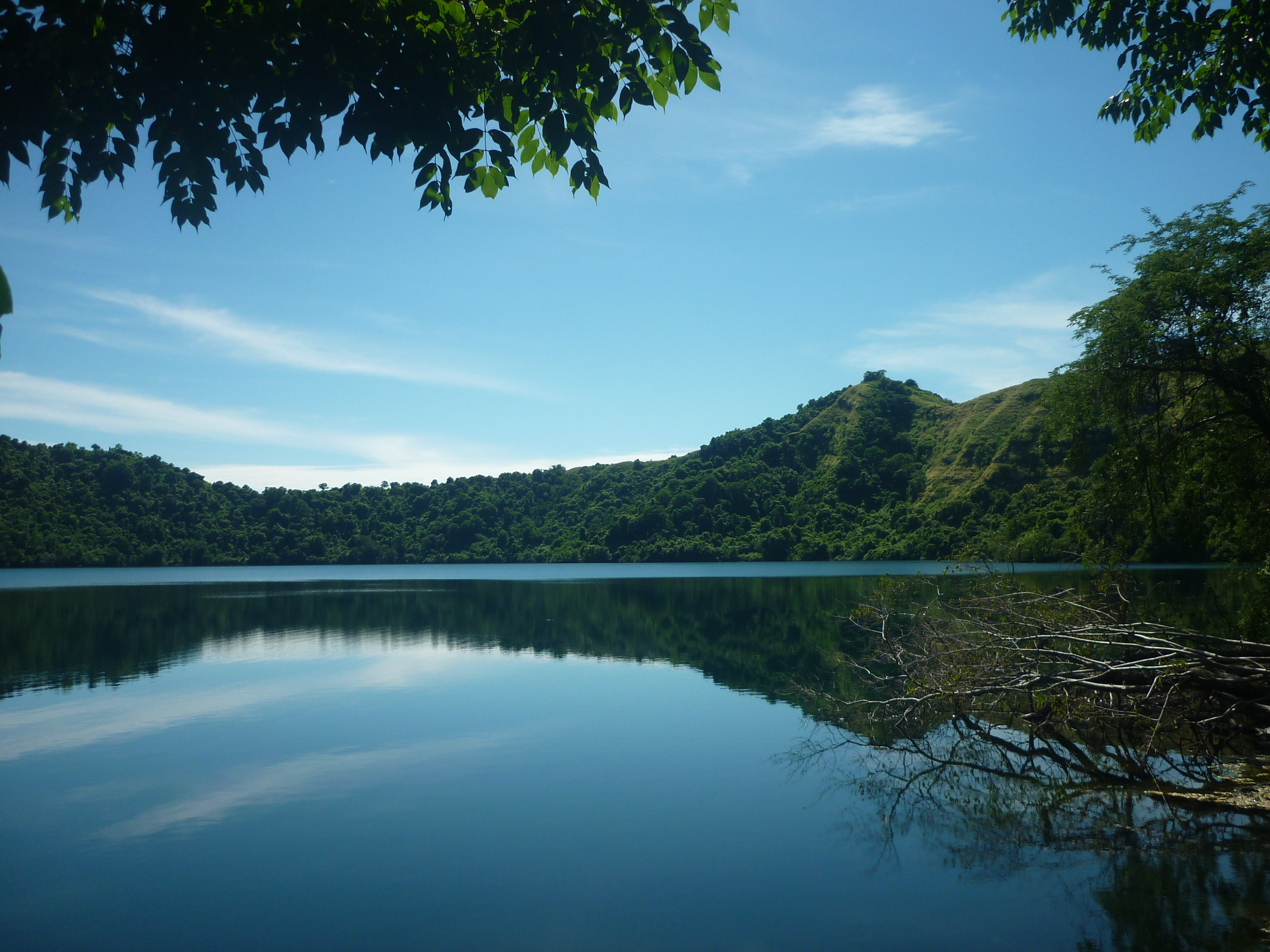
Satonda lake

There is a 77 hectares (190.3 acres) soda lake in the middle of the island, occupying two intersecting craters 39 and 69 meters deep as determined by echo-sounding. The southern crater is 950 m in diameter and the northern one is 400 m in diameter; at the bottom they are separated by a 10 m high ridge.

The lake is surrounded by sandy beaches. At 13 sites around the lake, large calcareous reefs extrude from rocky points; they are submerged for at least 23 m, are 1 to 2 m thick with very steep walls, and their tip emerge by about 50 cm at the end of the dry season. They are made of brittle, cavernous limestone composed of aragonite and low-Mg-calcite, partly silicified. Their structure alternates between layers of in vivo calcifying Pleurocapsales cyanobacteria and of red algae (Peyssonnelia sp., Lithoporella sp.), often separated by accumulations of gastropod fecal pellets settled in cyanobacterial micrite — although the red algae are present only in the first 1 cm of the reefs. The pellets are produced by the Cerithium species; these and the gastropods' shells contribute significantly to the mass of the reef.

The fauna in the lake is extremely poor in species; contrary to what one could expect, hardly any colonization seems to issue from the nearby reef only 100 m away and boasting a thriving diversity of tropical marine reef species. In 1990 the following species were noted (some of which may be endemic): one species of thin-shelled cerithiid gastropod; one species of monaxonid demosponge; one species of amphipod crustacean; one species of small fish; one species of hydrozoa; one species of infaunal oligochaet; and three species of green algae. There were also, in reef and sediment samples, subfossil shells of two bivalve species (Lioconcha sp.?, Pinctada sp.?); three gastropod species (Cerithium sp., common; Ocenebra sp., seldom; and Neritina sp., rare); and dense aggregates of serpulid tubes. A population of monaxonid sponges (Suberites sp.) colonizes the reefs surfaces, intertwining with the green algae; and a dense population of Oligochaeta (worms) lives in the black sandy mud on the lakeshore.

The lake has been extensively researched by biogeologists Stephan Kempe and Josef Kazmierczak since 1984. (Note: "Soda Ocean Hypothesis": In biology, the Soda Ocean Hypothesis (SOH) is based on that certain reactions considered essential for biogenesis are favored by alkaline conditions, among other reasons because peptidebonds are more stable in alkaline than in acidic environments. In earth science / geochemistry, the Soda Ocean Hypothesis was first exposed during a public lecture on the global carbon cycle on November 22nd, 1983. Its theory was then published in Kempe & Degens (1985, 1986) and in Kempe et al. (1989). Then came in November 1984 the Dutch-Indonesian scientific expedition of the Snellius II in the Flores sea, led by chief-scientist Doeke Eisma and with participants from Hamburg: Egon T. Degens, V. Ittekkot and Stephan Kempe. The latter, who was looking for a marine but alcaline environment to sustain the SOH theory, noted that the lake on Satonda island was close to sea level and therefore possibly filled with seawater, and prompted a visit to the lake. Thus on November 22nd, 1984, day for day one year after the SOH was first exposed, Kempe, Doeke Eisma, Theo Buisma, Haruna Mappa and Surino inspected the island and its lake. It was then determined that the lake water was salty but had a pH of 8.55 — that value was soon to be modulated according to the location of the samplings, although the lake proved to retain all around a high value of alkalinity and fulfilled the aim of studying soda lakes. Kempe & Kazmierczak have published a number of papers on that lake, most notably in 1984, 1989, 1990, 1993, 1994, 1996 and 1997. A “soda lake” is defined as a lake with highly alkaline water — although this is a very simplified way of putting it, as it is modulated by a number of factors. Its pH can reach in excess of 10.5 and its alkalinity can be >150 milliequivalents per litre (meq/l). Soda lakes seem to be associated with active tectonic and volcanic zones and exist in two types: soda lakes in endorheic depressions, with no oulet — they may be enclosed following tectonic movements or by volcanic dams. Most of the larger soda lakes seem to be in that category. The largest soda lake on Earth is Lake Van (Van Gölü) in eastern Anatolia, by volume the third largest closed basin lake on Earth (after Lake Aral dried up); its water exit was dammed by an eruption of the Nemrut volcano.; soda lakes in volcanic craters or calderas and typically have no surface tributaries. Apart from Satonda lake, other volcanic soda lakes are Niuafoʻou lake (one of the Niua Islands in the southern Pacific Ocean between Fiji and Samoa), Kauhakō Crater lake (in the center of the Kalaupapa Peninsula on the island of Molokaʻi, Hawaii), Empakai Crater (Tanzania), a crater on the island of Pantelleria (Italy), and very possibly many others.)

Radiocarbon dating indicates that the lake was invaded by sea water 4,000 years ago, maybe because of a collapse in part of the crater rim; the water was quickly alkalised, and the reefs started growing soon after.
Its water has three layers. The upper one is 22.8 m thick, it is oxygenated; compared to seawater, it is less saline but more alkaline, has a higher pH, and lower concentrations of Ca and Mg.
The 22.8 m deep chemocline is marked by a sharp decrease of the pH, which indicates an increase in pCO_{2} (partial pressure of carbon dioxide): from 340 ppmv (part per million by volume) at the surface, it rises to 240,000 ppmv at the bottom of the lake.
The two other layers underneath are anaerobic and more saline than seawater. Alkalinity increases considerably with depth: it goes from 3.4 meq/kg near the surface, to nearly 50 meq at the bottom of the lake. On the other hand, Ca concentration hardly increases.

Kempe & Kazmierczak 1990b suggest that organic matter falling into the lake is progressively respired at depth, releasing isotopically light CO_{2}. The increase in pCO_{2} causes weathering of the silicates at the bottom of the lake, as well as weathering of the 80 cm of ashes received during the eruption of the Tambora in 1815. The weathering of silicates increases the alkalinity. The water degases at the surface, which increases the pH and, because of the high alkalinity, brings a supersaturation of carbonate minerals. In surface waters, saturation index (SI) for calcite — which is a calcium carbonate polymorph, CaCo_{3} — is above 0.8 and that for dolomite is above 2.8; both values decrease rapidly with depth, and undersaturation is reached below the chemocline.
In the upper layer, the supersaturation allows microlithes to extract CaCo_{3}, which explains the low amount of Ca; it seems that no enzymes are involved in this extraction. The amount of Ca is still significantly higher than that in sea water.

As a succinct summary, it can be said that the high level of alkalinity causes a high supersaturation of calcium carbonate minerals and the formation of modern analogues of Precambrian microbialitic stromatolites along the fringes of the lake. This confers to the lake a significant scientific importance: the Cretaceous–Paleogene extinction event some 66 million years ago saw the extinction of cyanobacterial stromatolithes along with 3/4 of all plant and animal species. Riding (1982) had suggested that their disappearance was due to a modification of the Mg/Ca ratio; Kempe & Kazmierczak 1990b suggested instead that it was more likely due to changes in the saturation index of calcite (both ideas are not mutually exclusive, because the solubility of calcite increases when its magnesium content rises — see page "Marine biogenic calcification").

Thus the lake has been closely linked with the "Soda Ocean Hypothesis"; Kempe & Kazmierczak have qualified lake Satonda as "a recreated model of late Precambrian ocean chemistry" — that is, the "soda lake" environment that prepared the great explosion of life during the Cambrian.

== Bibliography ==
- Arp, Gernot; Reimer, Andreas; Reitner, Joachim (March 2004). "Microbialite formation in seawater of increased alkalinity, Satonda Crater Lake, Indonesia — Reply". Journal of Sedimentary Research. 74 (2): 318–325. Bibcode:2004JSedR..74..318A. doi:10.1306/081503740318. hdl:11858/00-1735-0000-0001-33F8-2.
- Benzerara, Karim; Meibom, Anders; Gautier, Quentin; Kaźmierczak, Józef; Stolarski, Jarosław; Menguy, Nicolas; Brown, Gordon E. (2010). "Nanotextures of aragonite in stromatolites from the quasi-marine Satonda crater lake, Indonesia". Geological Society, London, Special Publications. 336 (1): 211–224. Bibcode:2010GSLSP.336..211B. doi:10.1144/SP336.10.
- Kazmierczak, Józef; Kempe, Stephan (2004a). "Calcium build-up in the Precambrian sea. A Major Promoter In The Evolution Of Eukaryotic Life". In Joseph Seckbach (ed.). Origins. Genesis, Evolution and Diversity of Life. Series "Cellular Origin, Life in Extreme Habitats and Astrobiology", vol. 6. pp. 329–345.
- Kazmierczak, Józef; Kempe, Stephan (March 2004b). "Microbialite formation in seawater of increased alkalinity, Satonda Crater Lake, Indonesia". Journal of Sedimentary Research (Discussion of Arp et al. (2003), January issue). 74 (2): 314–317. doi:10.1306/061303740314.
- Kempe, Stephan; Kazmierczak, Józef (1990). "Chemistry and stromatolites of the sea-linked Satonda Crater Lake, Indonesia: A recent model for the Precambrian sea?". Chemical Geology. 81 (4): 299–310. Bibcode:1990ChGeo..81..299K. doi:10.1016/0009-2541(90)90052-9.
- Kempe, Stephan; Kazmierczak, Józef (1993). "Satonda Crater Lake, Indonesia: Hydrogeochemistry and Biocarbonate". Facies. 28 (1): 1–31. Bibcode:1993Faci...28....1K. doi:10.1007/BF02539726.
- Kempe, Stephan; Kazmierczak, Józef (January 1994). "The role of alkalinity in the evolution of ocean chemistry, organization of living systems, and biocalcification processes (Part 1, References see Part 2)". Bulletin de l'Institut océanographique (IUCN workshop, Monaco, 15–16 November 1993: "Past and Present Biomineralisation Processes. Considerations about the Carbonate Cycle", editor François Doumenge). special n° 13 (1): 61–99. Bibcode:1993Faci...28....1K. doi:10.1007/BF02539726.
- Kempe, Stephan; Kazmierczak, Józef; Reimer, Andreas; Landmann, Günter; Reitner, Joachim (March 2018). "Microbialites and Hydrochemistry of the Crater Lake of Satonda - a Status Report". Project: Ke 287/9. Untersuchung der Mikrobialithe und Spongien-Assoziation im mit alkalischem Meerwasser gefüllten Kratersee von Satonda (Indonesien) als rezentes Beispiel fossiler Spongiolithfazies - Project Leader: S. Kempe (Darmstadt) (first publication in 1996 as a chapter in Globale und regionale Steuerungsfaktoren biogener Sedimentation): 59–63.
- Pisera, Andrzej; Rützler, Klaus; Kazmierczak, Józef; Kempe, Stephan (2010). "Sponges in an extreme environment: suberitids from the quasi-marine Satonda Island crater lake (Sumbawa, Indonesia)". Journal of the Marine Biological Association of the United Kingdom. 90 (1): 203–212. Bibcode:2010JMBUK..90..203P. doi:10.1017/S0025315409990968.
- Reitner, Joachim; Wörheide, Gert; Arp, Gernot; Reimer, Andreas; Hooper, John N. A. (January 1999). "An unusual suberitid demosponge from a marine alkaline crater lake (Satonda Island, Indonesia)". Memoirs of the Queensland Museum (44): 477–478.
