= Fremantle to Bali yacht race =

Ocean yacht race (Fremantle to Bali)

The Fremantle to Bali yacht race is an ocean yachting race hosted by Fremantle Sailing Club between Fremantle and Benoa harbour, Denpasar in Bali, Indonesia. The distance of the race is over 1,440 nautical miles (2,670 km; 1,660 mi) and can take 7 days or longer to traverse.

The official name of the race has varied over the years.

== Inaugural race - 1981 ==
The race was inaugurated in 1981.

== 1993 ==
The 1993 event was covered by film makers and turned into a film.

== 2011 ==
The race of 2011 was the first since 1997. It was known as the "Visit Indonesia Fremantle - Bali International Yacht Race 2011", and had 23 entrants.

== 2013 ==
In 2013 it was known as the "Wonderful Indonesia Fremantle to Bali Race", and organised by the Fremantle Sailing Club.

== 2015 ==
In 2015 the race still had the same name of "Wonderful Indonesia Fremantle to Bali race".

== 2017 ==
In 2017 the event became the "Fremantle to Bali Ocean Classic - Race & Rally", sponsored by Tourism Western Australia for the third consecutive event.

== See also ==
- Tourism Western Australia
- Ministry of Tourism (Indonesia)
- Sail Indonesia
