= Lioconcha polita =

Scientific classification
- Kingdom: Animalia
- Phylum: Mollusca
- Class: Bivalvia
- Order: Venerida
- Family: Veneridae
- Genus: Lioconcha
- Species: L. polita

Binomial name
- Lioconcha polita (Röding, 1798)

Species of marine bivalve mollusk

Lioconcha polita is a species of marine bivalve mollusc in the family Veneridae. It was first described by Röding in 1798.
