= Karimata Strait =

Waterway in Indonesia between the islands of Belitung and Borneo

- Selat Karimata (Indonesian)
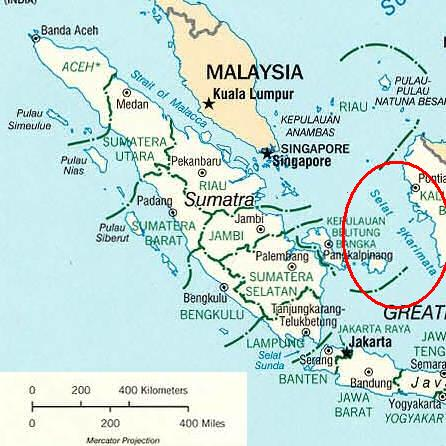
- Karimata Strait

- Location within Sumatra
- Coordinates: 2°05′S 108°40′E
- Type: Strait
- Basin countries: Indonesia
- References: Selat Karimata: Indonesia National Geospatial-Intelligence Agency, Bethesda, MD, USA

The Karimata Strait (alternatively, Carimata or Caramata; Indonesian: Selat Karimata) is a wide strait that connects the South China Sea to the Java Sea, separating the Indonesian islands of Belitung to the west and Borneo (Kalimantan) to the east. It is the widest strait between the South China Sea and the Java Sea (other straits include the Bangka and Gaspar straits), but its numerous islands and reefs reduce its navigability. Its weather and current is influenced by the annual southeast and northwest monsoon.

It was used as an invasion route by the British fleet in the 1811 Invasion of Java in the Dutch East Indies. More recently, it was the site of the crash of Indonesia AirAsia Flight 8501, and the location of the 2016 edition of Sail Indonesia (dubbed "Sail Karimata Strait").

== Geography ==
The strait is about 128 miles (111 nmi; 206 km) wide from the east coast of Belitung (also known as Billiton) to the west coast of Borneo (Kalimantan). The much narrower Gaspar Strait separates Belitung from Bangka Island to the west. Bangka lies close to the east coast of Sumatra, separated from it by the Bangka Strait. To the east of Belitung lie reefs and a group of islets known as the Montaran Islands, extending up to 40 nautical miles (46 mi; 74 km) from Belitung's northeastern coast. The Karimata Islands lie in the eastern part of the Karimata Strait, northeast of Belitung, southwest of Maja Island, and off-shore from the west coast of Borneo. The presence of these islands and reefs reduce the width of the main navigable channel to about 45 nautical miles (52 mi; 83 km). Outside this main fairway, there are multiple navigable channels to the east of Karimata Islands or between the islands.

The Rivers Kapuas, Kendawangan, Pawan, and Sambas (in Borneo), as well as the Rivers Barumun and Musi (in Sumatra) empty to the strait.

=== Climate ===
The southeast monsoon prevails in the strait from about the end of May, which comes with strong southeast or south-southeast wind, a dry weather, and mist that can obscure visibility. The northwest monsoon comes from the beginning of October, characterized by thunderstorms, rain and squalls alternating with calm days with fair weather. The biggest rainfall occur from November to February. From February, the weather becomes unpredictable because of the changing monsoon, before settling again around the end of May.

=== Currents and water transport ===
The current strength of the strait vary depending on the monsoon wind. At the peak of either monsoon, the current can run up to 6 kilometres per hour (3 nautical miles per hour) When the monsoon is light, "there is little or no current" and the direction may be subject to the tidal stream.

The strait's currents run between the South China Sea to its north and the Java Sea to its south. Since it is relatively shallow, with the depth of 50 metres (160 ft) or less, the volume transported by the current is relatively small. A 2007–2008 study by a group of Indonesian and Chinese researchers found that the transport volume averaged 500,000 m^{3}/second (or 0.5 Sv) with a net southward direction (i.e. to the Java Sea). During the northern hemisphere winter, roughly during the northwest monsoon, water flowed southward averaging 2.7 Sv. The flow was reversed during the northern hemisphere summer, roughly during the southwest monsoon, with an average transport of 1.2 Sv.

== History ==
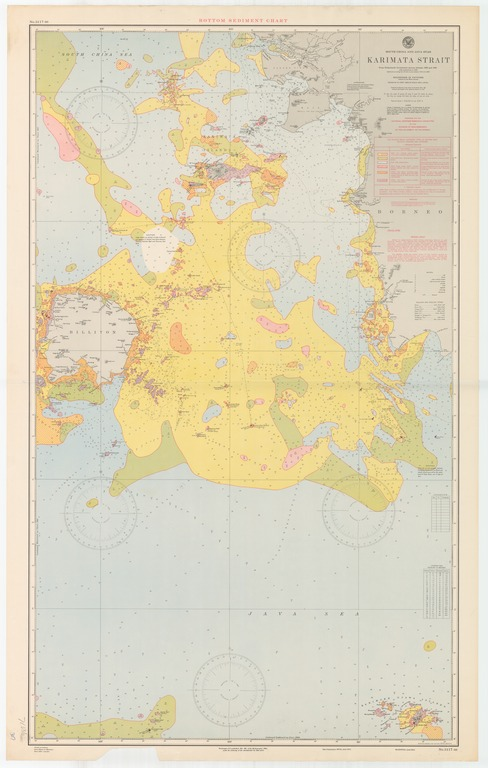
A 1917 nautical chart of the strait, published by the United States Hydrographic Office.

It was known to British sailors in the 18th and 19th centuries as the Caramata Passage. The strait was used as a route by the British fleet for its Invasion of Java (1811), sailing from the British base in Malacca to the island of Java, then part of the Dutch East Indies. Initially, the British were unsure of the strait's practicability, and hesitated between taking it or a northeast passage around the north of Borneo and through Makassar Strait. A report by Sir Thomas Stamford Raffles, then a British officer in Malacca, recommended taking the Karimata route, which he considered "less dangerous than tedious" than the northeast passage during that time of year. Raffles estimated that this journey would take the British fleet between a month and six weeks for "the fleet sailing in divisions". The British Governor-General of India The Lord Minto decided to take Raffles's suggestion over the objection of some naval officers. The fleet, numbering about 100 vessels and transporting about 11,000 troops, departed Malacca between 11 and 18 June 1811, and reached the coast of Java on 30 July after a smooth journey, exactly six weeks after Minto and Raffles' departure.

A 1915 publication by the United States Hydrographic Office commented that despite being much wider, the strait did not have as much traffic as the parallel Bangka or Gaspar Straits. The publication said that the advantage of its breadth was often outweighed by the danger posed by shoals in the strait, as well as its more irregular currents.

== Recent events ==
On 28 December 2014 Indonesia AirAsia Flight 8501 crashed into the strait, after losing contact over the Java Sea while en route to Singapore from Surabaya, East Java. All 162 passengers and crew aboard the plane perished, however, only 116 were physically recovered by the time search-and-rescue operations concluded in March 2015.

Sail Indonesia (2016), also dubbed "Sail Karimata Strait 2016", was a sailboat competition held within the strait. Four Indonesian provinces—on both sides of the strait (West Kalimantan, Jambi, Bangka Belitung and the Riau Islands, respectively)—hosted the race, with the peak event having taken place on 15 October on Datuk Island, North Kayong Regency, West Kalimantan.
