= Moyo Island =

Island in the Sumbawa Regency, Indonesia

Moyo
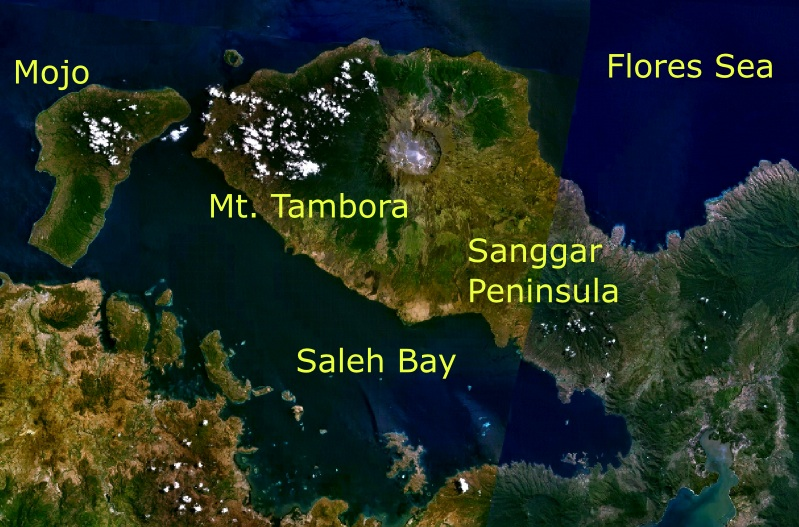
- Location of the island
- Interactive map of Moyo

Geography
- Location: South East Asia
- Coordinates: 8°15′S 117°34′E
- Archipelago: Lesser Sunda Islands
- Area: 349 km^{2} (135 sq mi)
- Highest elevation: 85 - 160 m (-246 ft)

Administration
- Indonesia
- Province: West Nusa Tenggara

Demographics
- Population: ca. 4,200 (2022)
- Pop. density: 12/km^{2} (31/sq mi)
- Ethnic groups: Sumbawa and Bimanese

Moyo (older spelling Mojo) is an island off the north coast of Sumbawa Island, in Sumbawa Regency, West Nusa Tenggara province, Indonesia.

== Description, administrative divisions ==
It has an area of 349 km^{2} and is about 8° south of the equator.

The island rises 648 metres (2,126 feet) above sea level, and its centre is composed mainly of savannah and some strands of the forest.

The island is divided in two administrative villages (desa): Labuhan Aji in the south and Sebotok in the north. Both are within Labuhan Badas district.

== Population ==
In 2022 there were 1333 households and 4,200 inhabitants, distributed in 6 villages.

== Occupations ==
Fishing and farming are the most prevalent occupations and are not mutually exclusive - most farmers also fish, and reciprocally. A few people have small businesses and deal with tourism services. Very few work in the local government as civil servants.

The most frequent crop is cashew; there are also coconut, mango, lebui beans (Cajanus sp.), upland rice, srikaya, corn and sesame.

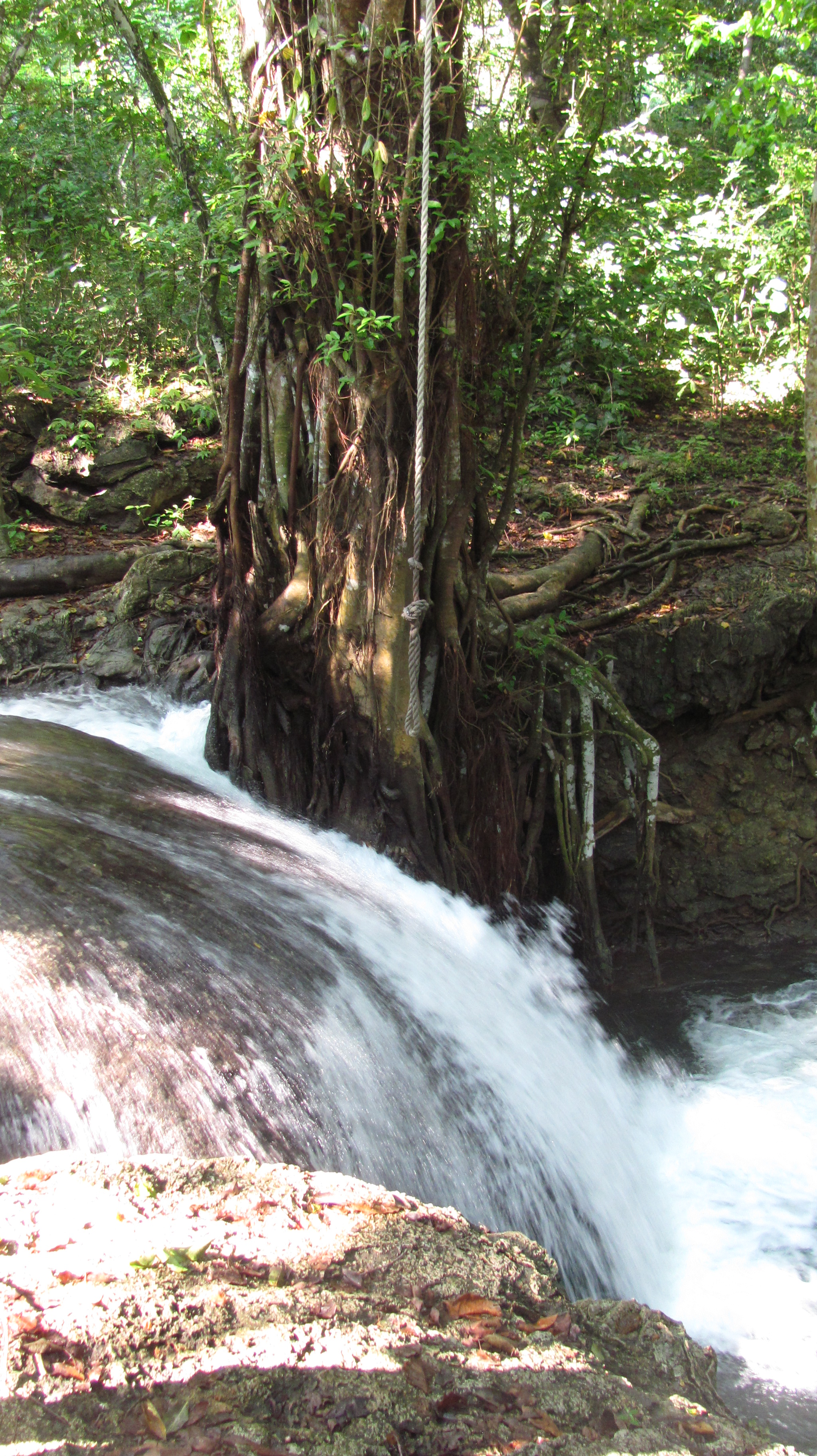
Waterfall Diwu mbai near Labuan Haji

== Nature park and reserve ==
On September 29, 1986, Moyo Island was declared as a conservation area (Moyo Island Hunting Park) for the Buru Park (22,250 hectares (54,980.9 acres) or 22,537.90 hectares (55,692.4 acres)) and the Marine Nature Tourism Park (6,000 hectares (14,826.3 acres)). The area is managed by the Indonesian Ministry of Forestry in collaboration with the Natural Resources Conservation Center of West Nusa Tenggara. This area is home to macaques, wild cattle, wild pigs, barking deer, deer (Cervus timorensis) and several varieties of birds.

In 2018, the island is proposed as part of Moyo Satonda National Park along with Satonda Island. The area is home to long-tail macaques (Macaca fascicularis), wild bovines, wild pigs, deer (Cervus timorensis), and 21 bat species including flying foxes. Bird-watching enthusiasts can observe 86 species of birds, 2 of them endangered: the yellow-headed parrot and the Tanimbar Megapode bird (Megapodius tenimberensis) which is endemic to Indonesia; it nests in large sandy heaps, litter, and other debris, where the heat generated by the decomposition of the organic material serves to incubate the eggs.
Inside the Park there are also a few waterfalls; the biggest one is about 2 hours from Labuan Aji village, the others are within 15 minutes walking distance, in the forest frequented by a multitude of colorful butterflies. Mata Jitu Waterfall, visited by the Princess of Wales Lady Diana, is about 4 km from Labuhan Aji.

Recently, the entire coastline of Moyo Island has been declared a marine conservation area. The coral reefs and their inhabitants are now protected from fishing and pollution.

== Tourism ==
Moyo is still considered "undiscovered" in tourism. Visitors usually reach the island via boat trips from Sumbawa Besar. There are a couple of lodgings on the island, the most prominent being Amanwana, a part of the Aman Resorts, which consists of 20 luxury tents that generally charge $2,000 a night. In 1993, the resort famously hosted Diana, Princess of Wales while she was going through a bad patch of her marriage to Prince Charles.

== Gallery ==
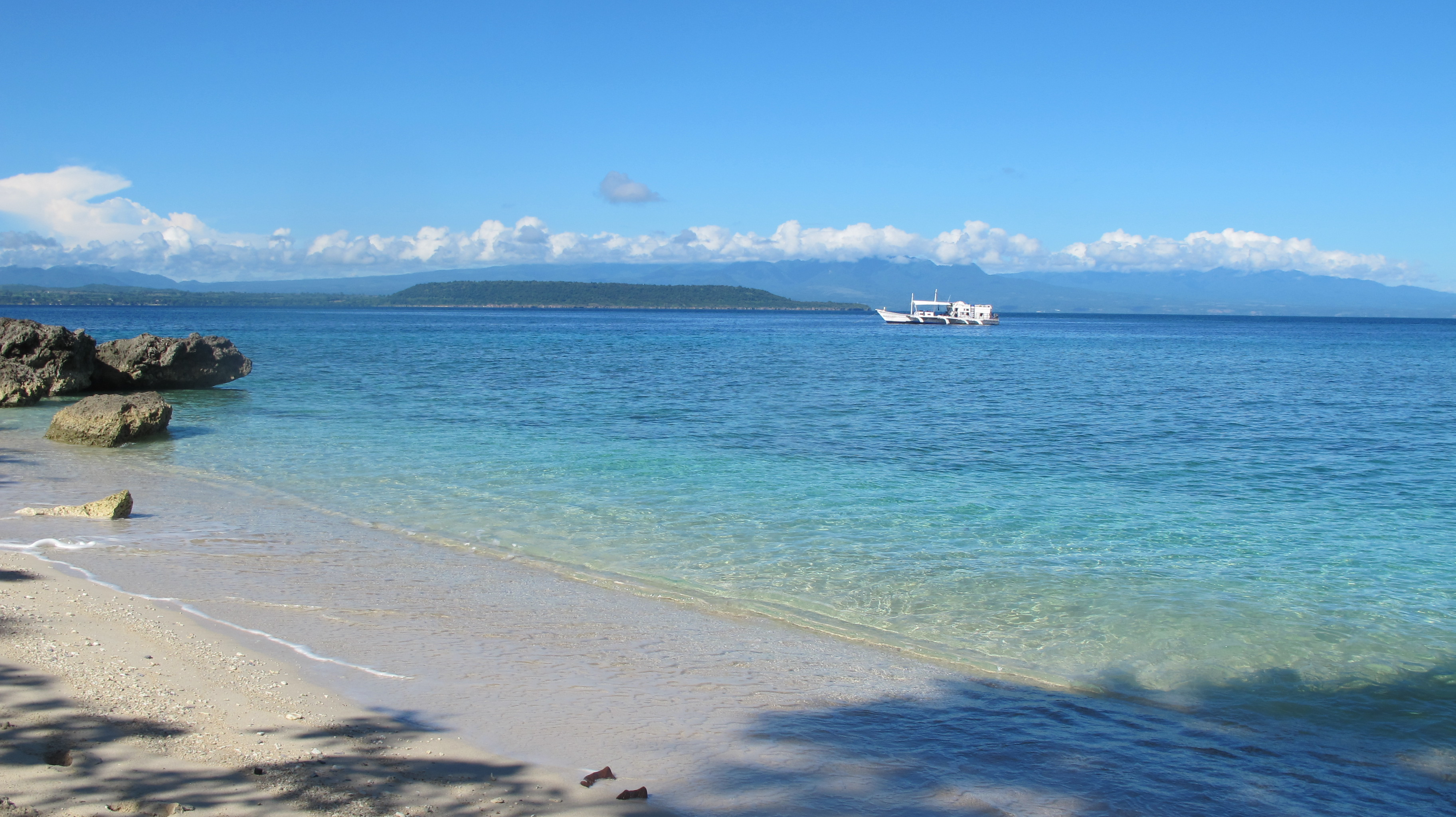
Beach in Moyo

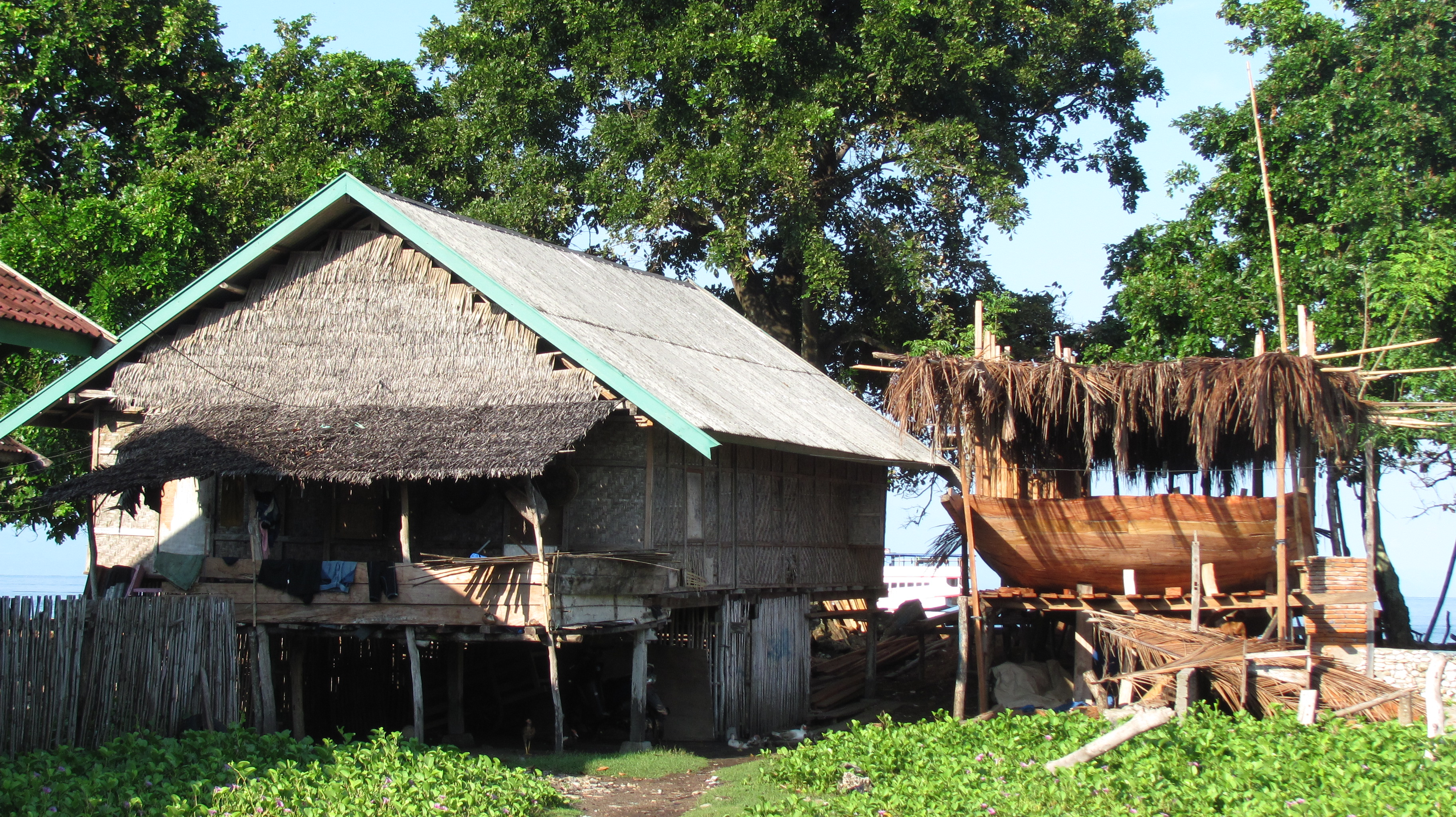
Traditional shipbuilding, Labuan Haji

== Bibliography ==
- Khairuddin, K.; Yamin, M. (December 2019). "Megapodius reinwardt conservation based on ecological knowledge of local people to support sustainable ecotourism on Moyo Island" (PDF). AIP Conference Proceedings: 1–10.
- Trimanto; Danarto, Setyawan Agung; Ashrafuzzaman, M. (2019). "Ethnobotanical uses of plants by Brangkuah Community of Moyo Island, West Nusa Tenggara, Indonesia" (PDF). Journal of Bangladesh Agricultural University. 17 (3): 325–337.
- Markum; Sayuti, Rosiady H.; Hilyana, Sitti; Anugrah, Galang (2022). "The dynamics of spatial utilization and tenurial conflict in conservation area of Moyo Island, West Nusa Tenggara". Journal of Natural Resources and Environmental Management. 12 (3): 445–455.
