= 2013 Sail Komodo =

2013 Sail Komodo was the fifth international sailing event by Sail Indonesia cooperating with Indonesian Ministry of Maritime Affairs, Indonesian Marine Board, and other Indonesian government agencies which was held in the area of East Nusa Tenggara province. 2013 Sail Komodo took the theme "The Golden Bridge Making East Nusa Tenggra – The World's Main Tourism Destination"" that was in line with Indonesian government's plan in accelerating the economic growth of remote areas through tourism and maritime sector. The series of events were held from 27 July to 14 September 2013 and more than 100 participants were involved in yacht rally which was the main activity of 2013 Sail Komodo.

== Goal ==
The main goal of 2013 Sail Komodo was to accelerate the development of East Nusa Tenggara in economy and tourism sector. Moreover, 2013 Sail Komodo was also conducted to develop the tourism potential, increase citizens' welfare, expand the sailing route, and prepare East Nusa Tenggara to be world's tourists destination. The governor of East Nusa Tenggara hoped that 2013 Sail Komodo would affect the number of tourists coming to East Nusa Tenggara so that Visit Flobamora 2013 program would be successful as well.
