= 2012 Sail Morotai =

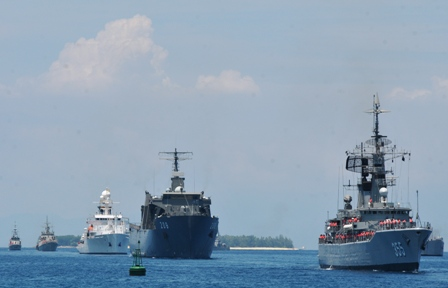
Indonesian and foreign naval ships during rehearsals for 2012 Sail Morotai

2012 Sail Morotai was the fourth international sailing event by Sail Indonesia cooperating with Indonesian Ministry of Maritime Affairs, Indonesian Marine Board, and other Indonesian government agencies. More than 100 participants from various countries across the world joined the event. 2012 Sail Morotai, with the theme Step to the New Era of Pacific Regional Economy, was released on 14 March 2012 by Indonesian Coordinating Minister of People's Welfare H. R. Agung Laksono, Indonesian Minister of Marine and Fishery Sharif C. Sutardjo, and Governor of North Maluku Thaib Armaiyn. 2012 Sail Morotai was conducted from June to September 2012 and the event was taking Morotai Island, North Maluku, as the main venue referring to Presidential Decree No. 4 of 2012. Morotai Island was chosen since it keeps not only the remains and history of World War II, but also potential marine to be explored.

Improving from the previous Sail Indonesia events, 2012 Sail Morotai held more various activities which were social event, yacht rally, cultural and marine seminar, marine sports, and marine expedition for research. Most of the activities were involving Indonesian National Army and war veterans from overseas.

== Goal ==
The main goal of 2012 Sail Morotai was to prosper the citizens of Morotai Island through the infrastructure construction and introduction of its potential nature, culture, and tourist destination worldwide. Moreover, the government of North Maluku hoped that Indonesia's image as a maritime country can be reflected through the event and it may help Asia Pacific’s economic growth.
