= Moyo Island Hunting Park =

On 29 September 1986, thanks to a decree by the Minister of Environment, the ‘Moyo Island Hunting Park’ was established. It is a Natural Reserve covering 22,537.90 hectares, currently managed by the Conservation Bureau of West Nusa Tenggara. This area is home to long-tail macaques (Macaca fascicularis), wild bovines, wild pigs, deer (Cervus timorensis) and 21 bat species, including flying foxes. Bird-watching enthusiasts can observe 86 species of birds, 2 of them endangered: the yellow-headed parrot and the Tanimbar megapode (Megapodium tenimberensis) which is endemic to Indonesia. It nests in large sandy heaps, litter, and other debris, where the heat generated by the decomposition of the organic material serves to incubate the eggs. Inside the Park there are also a few waterfalls, the biggest one is about 2 hours from Labuan Aji village, and the others are within easy reach, within 15 minutes walking distance, in the forest where there are colorful butterflies. Most of the east and west coasts and the entire south coast of Moyo Island have been declared Marine Park. Pristine coral reefs and all their inhabitants are now protected from fishing and pollution.
