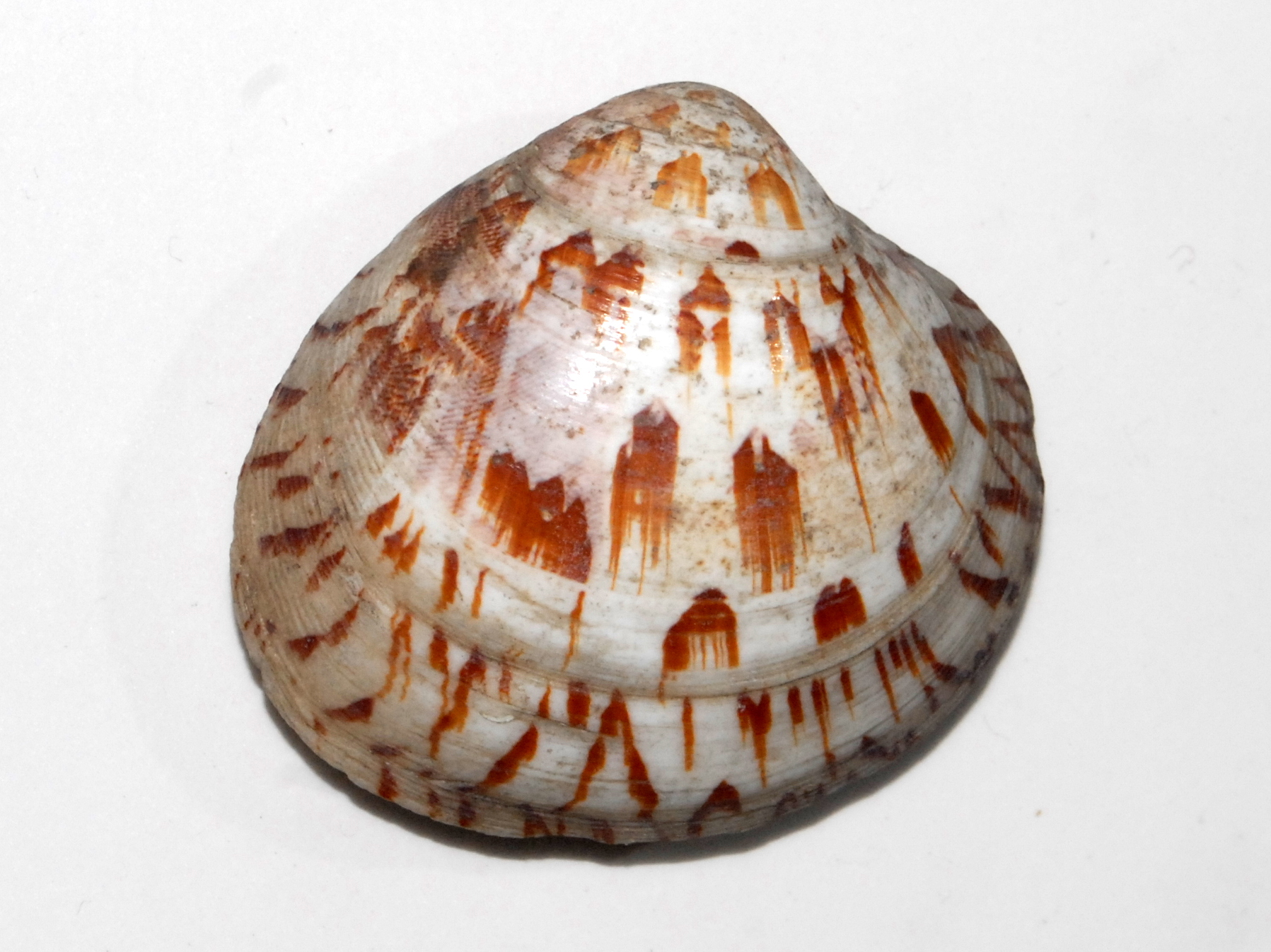
- Shell of Lioconcha castrensis at the Museo Civico di Storia Naturale di Milano

Scientific classification
- Kingdom: Animalia
- Phylum: Mollusca
- Class: Bivalvia
- Order: Venerida
- Family: Veneridae
- Genus: Lioconcha
- Species: L. castrensis

Binomial name
- Lioconcha castrensis (Linnaeus, 1758)

Synonyms
- Venus castrensis Linnaeus, 1758; Venus fulminea Röding, 1798; Venus lorenziana Dillwyn, 18

= Lioconcha castrensis =

Species of bivalve

Lioconcha castrensis, common name the zigzag venus, is a species of saltwater clam, a marine bivalve mollusc in the family Veneridae, the venus clams.

== Description ==
The shell of Lioconcha castrensis reaches a maximum length of about 55 mm; it is the largest species in the genus Lioconcha. The shape of the shell is trigonal ovate, with a subtruncated posterior margin and a rounded ventral and anterior margin. This species is equivalve. The valves are quite thick and show fine wrinkled growth lines. This species has a wide range of variations. Usually the shell has blue-black to tan zigzag lines and chestnut-brown blotches on a generally white background. The interior is white.

Right and left valve of the same specimen:

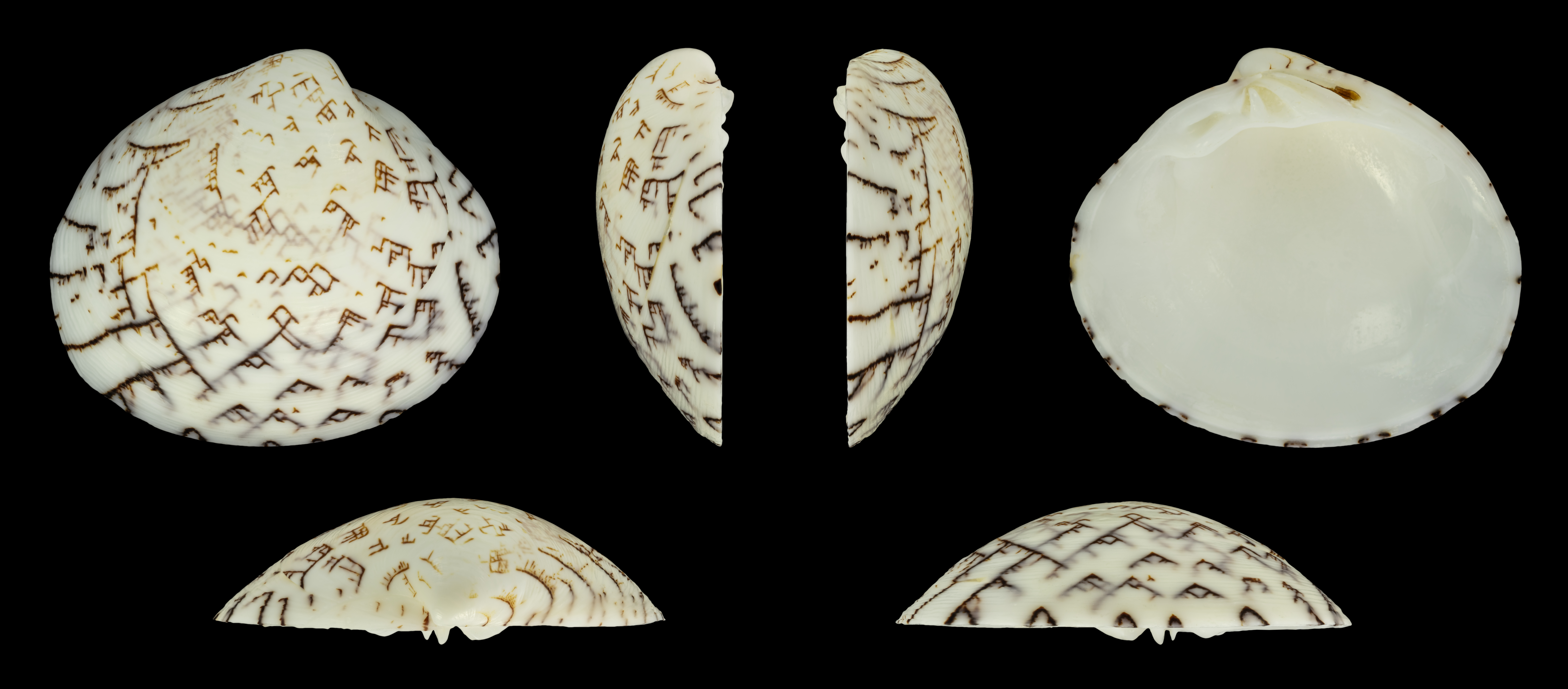
Right valve

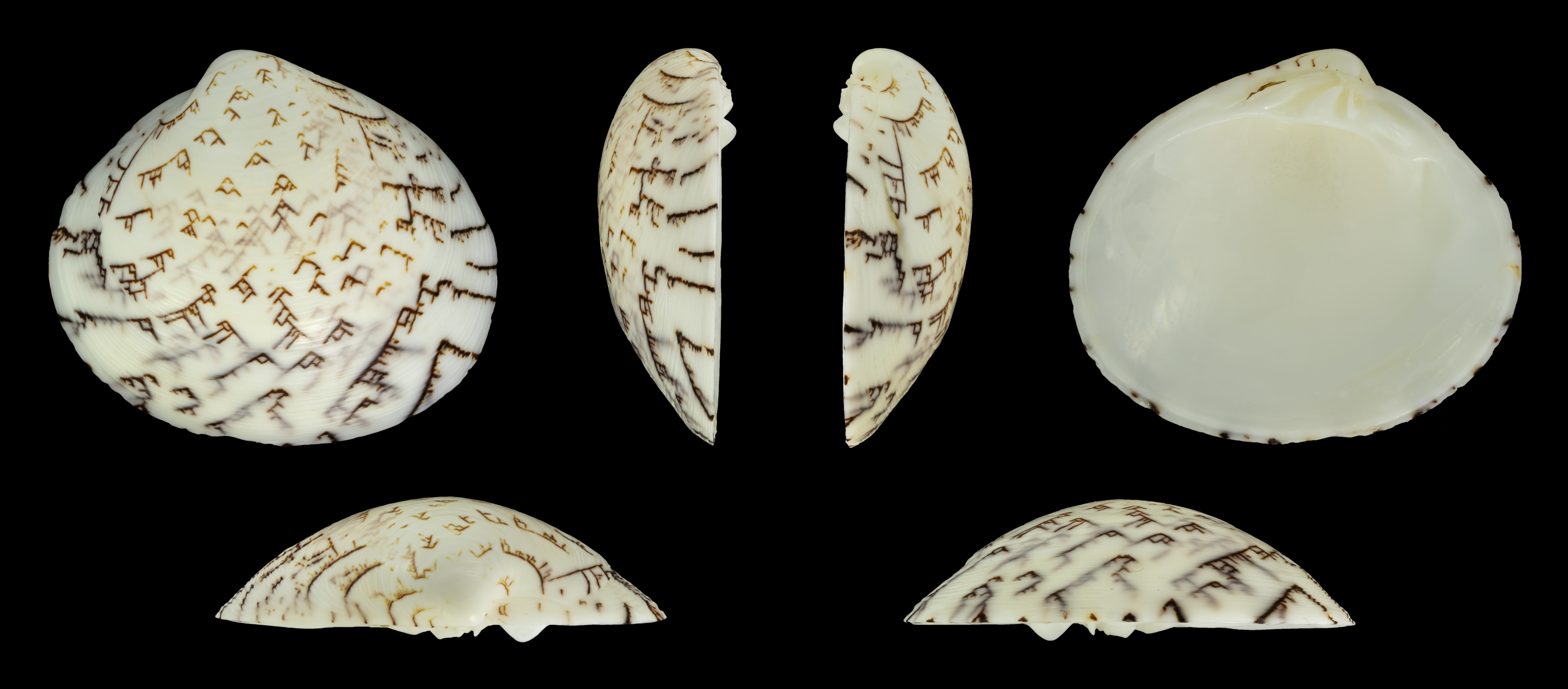
Left valve

== Distribution ==
This species has a wide Indo-West Pacific distribution.
