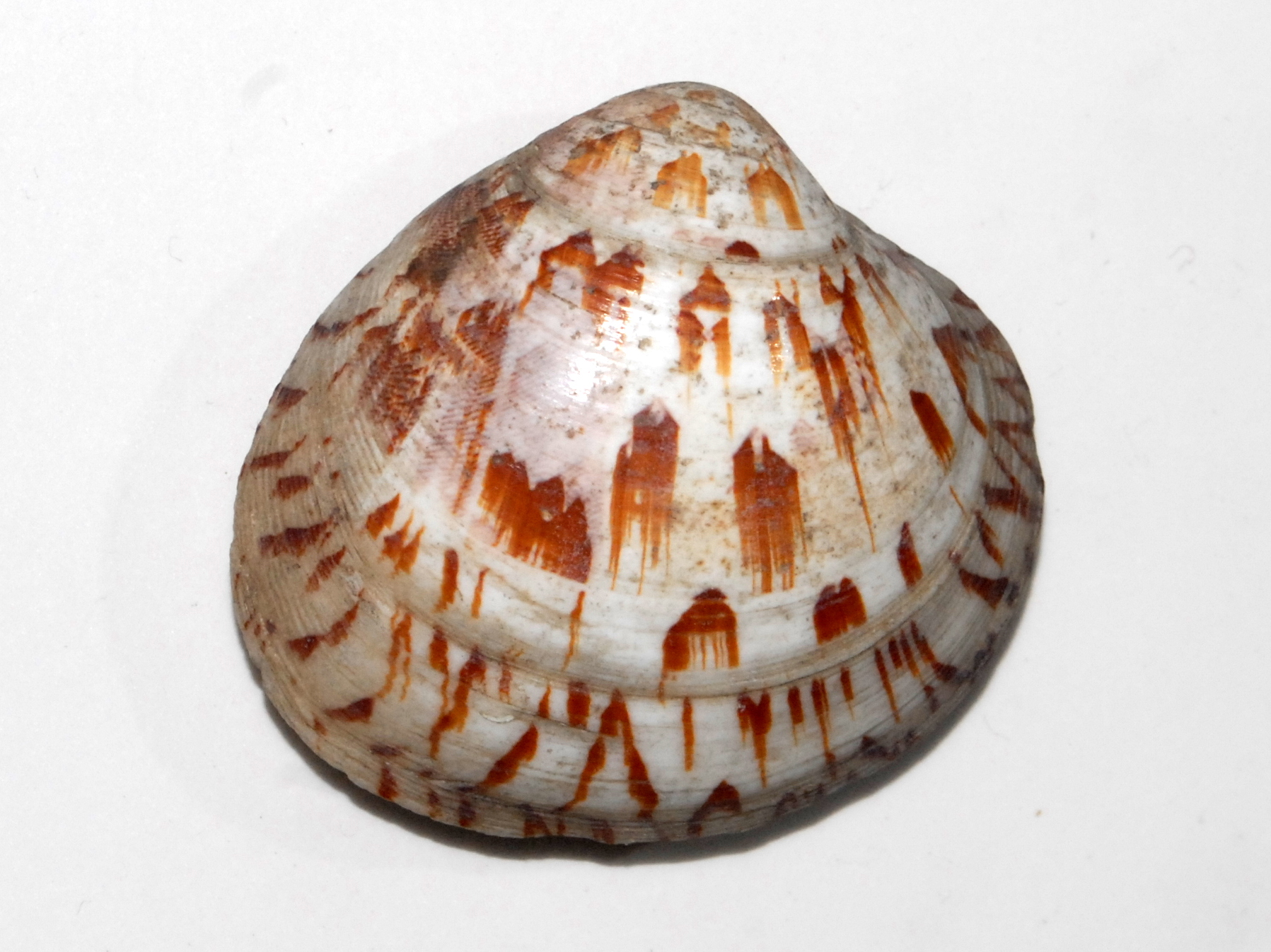
- Shell of Lioconcha rumphii at the Museo Civico di Storia Naturale di Milano

Scientific classification
- Domain: Eukaryota
- Kingdom: Animalia
- Phylum: Mollusca
- Class: Bivalvia
- Order: Venerida
- Family: Veneridae
- Genus: Lioconcha; Morch, 1853

Type species
- Venus castrensis Linnaeus, 1758

Species
- See text

Synonyms
- Lioconcha (Lioconcha) Mörch, 1853· accepted, alternate representation; Lioconcha (Sulcilioconcha) Habe, 1951· accepted, alternate representation

= Lioconcha =

Genus of bivalves

Lioconcha is a genus of molluscs in the family Veneridae.

== Species ==
- Lioconcha annettae Lamprell & Whitehead, 1990
- Lioconcha arabaya Van der Meij, Moolenbeek & Dekker, 2010
- Lioconcha berthaulti Lamprell & Healy, 2002
- Lioconcha caledonensis Harte & Lamprell, 1999
- Lioconcha castrensis (Linnaeus, 1758)
- Lioconcha fastigiata (Sowerby, 1851)
- Lioconcha gordoni (E. A. Smith, 1885)
- Lioconcha harteae M. Huber, 2010
- Lioconcha hieroglyphica (Conrad, 1837)
- Lioconcha kovalisi De Prins, 2013
- Lioconcha lamprelli Moolenbeek, Dekker & van der Meij, 2008
- Lioconcha macaulayi Lamprell & Healy, 2002
- Lioconcha melharteae Lamprell & Stanisic, 1996
- Lioconcha ornata (Dillwyn, 1817)
- Lioconcha philippinarum (Hanley, 1844)
- Lioconcha picta (Lamarck, 1818)
- Lioconcha polita (Röding, 1798)
- Lioconcha richerdeforgersi Lamprell & Stanisic, 1996
- Lioconcha rumphii Van der Meij, Moolenbeek & Dekker, 2010
- Lioconcha schiottei Lamprell & Healy, 2002
- Lioconcha sowerbyi (Deshayes, 1853)
- Lioconcha tigrina (Lamarck, 1818)
- Lioconcha trimaculata (Lamarck, 1818)
